= List of Telugu films of 2023 =

This is a list of Telugu cinema films released in 2023.

== Box office collection ==
The following is the list of highest-grossing Telugu cinema films released in 2023. The rank of the films in the following table depends on the estimate of worldwide collections as reported by organizations classified as green by Wikipedia. (Note: See WP:RSP, WP:ICTFSOURCES)

Highest grossing Telugu films of 2023
Rank (Note: Sorted based on the lowest value when figures are presented as a range, and for the same value, the older item is given a higher order.)	Title	Production company	Worldwide gross	Ref.
1	Salaar: Part 1 – Ceasefire	Hombale Films	₹614–700 crore	(Note: Salaar: Part 1 – Ceasefire's reported worldwide gross varies between ₹612–₹700 crore (Box Office India Firstpost and India Today))
2	Adipurush	T-Series Films Retrophiles	₹392.70 crore	(Note: Adipurush's reported worldwide gross is ₹392.70 crore according to Business Today, Deccan Chronicle, and News18.)
3	Waltair Veerayya	Mythri Movie Makers	₹236 crore	
4	Veera Simha Reddy	Mythri Movie Makers	₹134 crore	
5	Bhagavanth Kesari	Shine Screen	₹132 crore	
6	Dasara	Sri Lakshmi Venkateswara Cinemas	₹121 crore	
7	Sir	Sithara Entertainments Fortune Four Cinemas Srikara Studios	₹118 crore	
8	Bro	People Media Factory; Zee Studios	₹115.50 crore	
9	Virupaksha	Sri Venkateswara Cine Chitra; Sukumar Writings	₹90-103 crore	
10	Baby	Mass Movie Makers	₹85 crore	

== January–March ==
Opening		Title	Director	Cast	Production House	Ref.
J A N U A R Y	6	Prathyardhi	Shankar Mudavath	Ravi Varma Adduri; Rohit Behal; Akshata Sonawane; Neelima Pathakamsetti; Thagubothu Ramesh	Gaalu Paalu Dream Entertainments	
J A N U A R Y	12	Veera Simha Reddy	Gopichand Malineni	Nandamuri Balakrishna; Shruti Haasan; Varalaxmi Sarathkumar; Honey Rose; Duniya Vijay; P. Ravi Shankar; Lal; Chandrika Ravi	Mythri Movie Makers	
J A N U A R Y	13	Waltair Veerayya	K. S. Ravindra	Chiranjeevi; Ravi Teja; Shruti Haasan; Catherine Tresa; Bobby Simha; Prakash Raj	Mythri Movie Makers	
J A N U A R Y	14	Kalyanam Kamaneeyam	Anil Kumar Aalla	Santosh Sobhan; Priya Bhavani Shankar; Devi Prasad; Kedar Shankar; Saptagiri	UV Concepts	
J A N U A R Y	26	Hunt	Mahesh Surapaneni	Sudheer Babu; Srikanth; Bharath	Bhavya Creations	
J A N U A R Y	26	Valentines Night	Anil Gopireddy	Chaitanya Madadi; Lavanya Sahukara; Sunil; Posani Krishna Murali	Swan Movies	
J A N U A R Y	26	Sindhooram	Shyam Tummalapalli	Brigida Saga; Dharma; Siva Balaji	Sri Lakshmi Narasimha	
F E B R U A R Y	3	Michael	Ranjit Jeyakodi	Sundeep Kishan; Vijay Sethupathi; Divyansha Kaushik	Karan C Productions; Sree Venkateswara Cinemas	
F E B R U A R Y	3	Suvarna Sundari	Surendra Madarapu	Jaya Prada; Sakshi Chaudhary; Poorna	S Team Pictures	
F E B R U A R Y	3	Writer Padmabhushan	Shanmukha Prashant	Suhas; Tina Shilparaj; Ashish Vidyarthi; Rohini	Chai Bisket Films; Lahari Films	
F E B R U A R Y	3	Mayagadu	G. Karthik Reddy	Naveen Chandra; Gayathri Suresh; Pooja Jhaveri; Kabir Duhan Singh	Swathi Pictures	
F E B R U A R Y	4	Butta Bomma	Shouree Chandrashekhar T Ramesh	Anikha Surendran; Arjun Das; Surya Vashistta; Navya Swamy; Jagadeesh Prathap Bandari	Sithara Entertainments; Fortune Four Cinemas	
F E B R U A R Y	10	Amigos	Rajendra Reddy	Kalyan Ram; Ashika Ranganath	Mythri Movie Makers	
F E B R U A R Y	18	Vinaro Bhagyamu Vishnu Katha	Murali Kishor Abburu	Kiran Abbavaram; Kashmira Pardeshi; Murali Sharma; Subhalekha Sudhakar; Praveen; Aamani	GA2 Pictures	
F E B R U A R Y	18	Sridevi Shoban Babu	Prasanth Kumar Dimmala	Santosh Shoban; Gouri G. Kishan; Naga Babu; Rohini	GoldBox Entertainment	
F E B R U A R Y	24	Mr. King	Sasiidhar Chavali	Sharan Kumar; Yasvika Nishkala; Urvi Singh	Hanvika Creations	
M A R C H	3	Balagam	Venu Yeldandi	Priyadarshi; Kavya Kalyanram; Sudhakar Reddy; Muraleedhar Goud	Dil Raju Productions	
M A R C H	3	Organic Mama Hybrid Alludu	S. V. Krishna Reddy	Syed Sohel; Mirnalini Ravi; Rajendra Prasad; Meena	Kalpana Chitra; Ammu Creations	
M A R C H	3	Richie Gadi Pelli	K.S. Hemraj	Sathya S.K.; Chandana Raj; Bunny Vox; Naveen Neni; Kishore Maarisetty; Praneeta Patnaik	KS Film Works	
M A R C H	10	CSI Sanatan	Sivashankar Dev	Aadi Saikumar; Misha Narang; Nandini Rai; Ali Reza; Madhusudhan Rao; Vasanthi	Chaganti Productions	
M A R C H	17	Phalana Abbayi Phalana Ammayi	Srinivas Avasarala	Naga Shaurya; Malvika Nair; Srinivas Avasarala; Megha Chowdhury; Ashok Kumar; Abhishek Maharshi; Srividhya; Varanasi Soumya Chalamcharla; Harini Rao; Arjun Prasad	People Media Factory	
M A R C H	22	Das Ka Dhamki	Vishwak Sen	Vishwak Sen; Nivetha Pethuraj; Rao Ramesh; Tharun Bhascker; Akshara Gowda; Hyper Aadi; Ajay; Rohini; Prudhvi Raj; Mahesh Achanta	Vanmaye Creations; Vishwaksen Cinemas	
M A R C H	22	Ranga Maarthaanda	Krishna Vamsi	Prakash Raj; Ramya Krishnan; Brahmanandam; Shivathmika Rajashekar; Rahul Sipligunj; Anasuya Bharadwaj; Aadarsh Balakrishna; Ali Reza	Raja Shyamala Entertainments; Housefull Movies	
M A R C H	22	GeetaSakshigaa	Anthony Mattipalli	Aadarsh; Chitra Shukla; Srikanth Iyengar; Raja Ravindra; Sudharshan	Chethan Raj Films	
M A R C H	30	Dasara	Srikanth Odela	Nani; Keerthy Suresh; Dheekshith Shetty; Shine Tom Chacko; Samuthirakani; Shamna Kasim; Sai Kumar	Sri Lakshmi Venkateswara Cinemas	

== April–June ==
Opening		Title	Director	Cast	Production House	Ref.
A P R I L	7	Ravanasura	Sudheer Varma	Ravi Teja; Sushanth; Jayaram; Anu Emmanuel; Megha Akash; Fariah Abdullah; Daksha Nagarkar; Pujita Ponnada; Tulasi Shivamani; Rao Ramesh; Sreemukhi; Murali Sharma; Sampath Raj	RT Team Works; Abhishek Pictures	
A P R I L	7	Meter	Ramesh Kaduri	Kiran Abbavaram; Athulya Ravi; Saptagiri; Posani Krishna Murali	Clap Entertainment; Mythri Movie Makers	
A P R I L	13	Asalu	Uday–Suresh	Poorna; Ravi Babu	Flying Frogs	
A P R I L	14	Shaakuntalam	Gunasekhar	Samantha Ruth Prabhu; Dev Mohan; Sachin Khedekar; Mohan Babu; Aditi Balan; Ananya Nagalla; Prakash Raj; Gautami; Madhoo; Kabir Bedi; Jisshu Sengupta; Kabir Duhan Singh; Allu Arha; Varshini Sounderajan; Harish Uthaman	Gunaa Teamworks; Sri Venkateswara Creations	
A P R I L	21	10 Rupees	Afzal Shaik	Srikanth Chowtapalli; Pavitra Narayann; Mukhtar Khan	Outstanding Cinema Production	
A P R I L	21	Hello Meera	Srinivasu Kakarla	Gargeyi Yellapragada	Lumiere Cinema	
A P R I L	21	Two Souls	K. Shravan Kumar	Trinadh Varma; Bhavana Sagi; Mounika Reddy; Ravi Teja Mahadasyam	PKP & Creations	
A P R I L	21	Virupaksha	Karthik Varma Dandu	Sai Dharam Tej; Samyuktha Menon; Brahmaji; Sunil; Rajeev Kanakala; Sai Chand	Sri Venkateswara Cine Chitra; Sukumar Writings	
A P R I L	28	Agent	Surender Reddy	Akhil Akkineni; Mammootty; Sakshi Vaidya; Dino Morea; Vikramjeet Virk	AK Entertainments; Surender 2 Cinema	
A P R I L	28	Raa Raa Penimiti	Satya Venkat	Nandita Swetha	Sri Vijayanand Pictures	
A P R I L	29	Vidyarthi	Madhu Madasu	Chetan Cheenu; Bunny Vox; Naveen Neni; Yerra Raghu; Yadamma Raju	Mahas Creations	
M A Y	5	Ramabanam	Sriwass	Gopichand; Dimple Hayathi; Nassar; Jagapathi Babu; Subhalekha Sudhakar; Vennela Kishore; Sachin Khedekar; Satya; Ali; Raja Ravindra; Saptagiri; Getup Srinu; Khushbu	People Media Factory	
M A Y	5	Ugram	Vijay Kanakamedala	Allari Naresh; Mirnaa Menon; Indraja; Sharath Lohithaswa; Shatru; Naga Mahesh	Shine Screens	
M A Y	5	Arangetram	Srinivaas Praban	Roshan Z, Mustafa Askari, Srinivaas Praban, Pooja, Anirudh T, Laya, Indhu, Srivalli, Vijaya, Sai Sree, Jabardasth SathiPandu	Mahi Media Works	
M A Y	12	Bhuvana Vijayam	Yalamanda Charan	Sunil; Vasanthi Krishnan; Vennela Kishore; Srinivasa Reddy; Prudhvi	Himalaya Studio Mansions; Mirth Media	
M A Y	12	Katha Venuka Katha	Krishna Chaitanya	Viswant Duddumpudi; Srijitha Ghosh; Sunil; Raghu Babu; Satyam Rajesh	Dandamudi Box Office	
M A Y	12	Custody (Note: The film was produced in both the Telugu and Tamil languages, according to the filmmakers.)	Venkat Prabhu	Naga Chaitanya; Arvind Swamy; Krithi Shetty; Vennela Kishore; Priyamani; Sampath Raj; Premgi Amaren; Sarath Kumar; Satya	Srinivasa Silver Screen	
M A Y	12	Kalyanamasthu	Onthala Saai	Shekhar Verma; Vaibhavi Rao; Naga Mahesh; Sharath Lohitashwa	SMS Creations	
M A Y	12	Tea Break	Tanniru Ramesh	Ravi Kumar Sanapala; Priyanka Augustine; Sushma Eedhi	RK Entertainments	
M A Y	12	The Story of A Beautiful Girl	Ravi Prakash Bodapati	Madhunandan; Nihal Kodhaty; Drishika Chander; Bhargava Poludasu; Bhavana Durgam	Gen Next Movies	
M A Y	18	Anni Manchi Sakunamule	B. V. Nandini Reddy	Santosh Sobhan; Malvika Nair; Vennela Kishore; Rajendra Prasad; Rao Ramesh; Gautami; Naresh	Swapna Cinema; Mitra Vinda Movies	
M A Y	19	Haseena	Naveen Eragani	Priyanka Dey; SaiTeja Ganji; Thanveer MD; Akash Lal; Shiva Ganga	Aishwarya Creative Films; My Goal Cinema Entertainments	
M A Y	26	Malli Pelli	M. S. Raju	Naresh, Pavitra Lokesh, Jayasudha, Sarath Babu, Vanitha Vijayakumar	Vijaya Krishna Movies	
M A Y	26	Grey: The Spy Who Loved Me	Raj Madiraju	Ali Reza, Arvind Krishna, Urvashi Rai, Prathap Pothen, Raj Madiraju	Adwitiya Movies Private Limited	
M A Y	27	Boo	A. L. Vijay	Rakul Preet Singh, Vishwak Sen, Nivetha Pethuraj, Manjima Mohan, Megha Akash, Reba Monica John	Sarvanth Ram Creations, Shri Shirdi Sai Movies	
J U N E	2	Ahimsa	Teja	Abhiram Daggubati; Geethika Tiwary; Sadha; Rajat Bedi	Anandi Art Creations	
J U N E	2	Chakravyuham: The Trap	Chetkuri Madhusudhan	Ajay; Subhalekha Sudhakar; Gnaneswari Kandregula	Sahasra Creations	
J U N E	2	Nenu Student Sir	Rakhi Uppalapati	Bellamkonda Ganesh; Avantika Dassani	SV2 Entertainment	
J U N E	2	Mem Famous	Sumanth Prabhas	Sumanth Prabhas; Saarya Laxman	Chai Bisket Films; Lahari Films	
J U N E	2	Pareshan	Rupak Ronaldson	Thiruveer; Pavani Karanam	Waltair Productions; Sony Music South	
J U N E	9	Anantha	Madhu Babu Thokala	Prashanth Karthi; Rittika Chakraborthy; Anish Kuruvilla; Laya Biben	Sri Nethra Creations	
J U N E	9	Intinti Ramayanam	Suresh Naredla	Rahul Ramakrishna; Navya Swamy; Naresh	Ivy Productions; Sithara Entertainments	
J U N E	9	Unstoppable	Diamond Ratnababu	VJ Sunny; Saptagiri; Nakshatra; Aqsa Khan; Posani Krishna Murali	A2B Productions	
J U N E	9	Vimanam	Siva Prasad Yanala	Samuthirakani; Meera Jasmine; Anasuya Bharadwaj; Master Dhruvan	Kiran Korrapati Creative Works, Zee Studios	
J U N E	16	Kanulu Therichinaa Kanulu Moosinaa	Sandeep Reddi Katkuri	Sai Ronak; Devika Satheesh	Flying Eagle Entertainments	
J U N E	23	Karna	Kaladhar Kokkonda	Kaladhar Kokkonda; Mona Thakur; Chatrapathi Sekhar; Dil Ramesh; Asma Syed; Mahender	Sanatana Creations	
J U N E	29	Spy	Garry BH	Nikhil Siddhartha; Iswarya Menon; Jisshu Sengupta; Abhinav Gomatam; Makarand Deshpande	ED Entertainments	
J U N E	29	Samajavaragamana	Ram Abbaraju	Sree Vishnu; Reba Monica John; Vennela Kishore; Sudarshan; Srikanth Iyengar; Raghu Babu; Naresh; Rajeev Kanakala	AK Entertainments; Hasya Movies	
J U N E	30	Maya Petika	Ramesh Raparthi	Payal Rajput; Viraj Ashwin; Simrat Kaur	Just Ordinary Entertainment	

== July–September ==
Opening		Title	Director	Cast	Production House	Ref.
J U L Y	7	7:11 PM	Chaitu Madala	Saahas Pagadala; Deepika Reddy; Tess Walsh; Raghu Karamanchi	Arcus Films	
J U L Y	7	Bhaag Saale	Pranith Bramandapally	Sri Simha Koduri; Neha Solanki; Rajiv Kanakala; John Vijay	Vedaansh Creative Works	
J U L Y	7	Circle	Neelakanta	Sai Ronak; Arshin Mehta; Richa Panai; Snehal Kamath	Aura Productions	
J U L Y	7	Lily	M. Sivam	Neha Kamadari; P. Vedanth Varma; Pranathi Reddy; Mechelle Uday Shah; Rajeev Govinda Pilai	Gopuram Studios	
J U L Y	7	Mohankrishnas Gang Leader	Gangarapu Sree Laxman	Singuluri Mohan Krishna; Harini Reddy; Suman	SMK Films	
J U L Y	7	O Saathiya	Divya Bhavana	Aryan Gowra; Mishti Chakraborty; Devi Prasad	Thanvika Jashwika Creations	
J U L Y	7	Rangabali	Pawan Basamsetti	Naga Shaurya; Yukti Thareja; Shine Tom Chacko; Rajkumar Kasireddy	Sree Lakshmi Venkateshwara Cinemas	
J U L Y	7	Rudrangi	Ajay Samrat	Jagapati Babu; Mamta Mohandas; Vimala Raman; Ashish Gandh	Rasamayi Films	
J U L Y	14	Baby	Sai Rajesh Neelam	Anand Devarakonda; Viraj Ashwin; Vaishnavi Chaitanya; Lirisha Kunapareddy	Mass Movie Makers	
J U L Y	14	Revenge	Shrinivas Rettadi	Babu Pedapudi; Neha Pandey; Nagesh Karra; Indu Anand	Adi Akshara Entertainments	
J U L Y	20	Hidimbha	Aneel Kanneganti	Ashwin Babu; Nandita Swetha; Srinivasa Reddy; Makarand Deshpande; Vidyullekha Raman	SVK Cinema; Oak Entertainments; AK Entertainments	
J U L Y	21	Ala Ila Ela	Dwarki Raghav	Shakthi Vasudevan; Poorna; Rekha Vedavyas; Raja Chembolu; Hariprriya; Sayaji Shinde; Brahmanandam; Priyanka Kothari	Kala Movie Makers	
J U L Y	21	Detective Karthik	Venkat Narendra	Rajath Raghav, Goldie Nissy, Abhilash Bandari, Shruti Mol, Anusha Nuthula, Hasini Rai, Madee	Reading Lamp Creations One Media Et Pvt Ltd	
J U L Y	21	Annapurna Photo Studio	Chendu Muddu	Chaitanya Madadi; Lavanya Sahukara; Lalith Adithya; Viva Raghava	Big Ben Cinemas	
J U L Y	21	Her - Chapter 1	Sreedhar Swaraghav	Ruhani Sharma; Pradeep Rudra; Jeevan Kumar; Vikas Vasishta	Double Up Media Pvt. Ltd.	
J U L Y	21	Natho Nenu	Santhi Kumar Turlapati	P. Sai Kumar; Srinivas Sai; Aditya Om; Deepali Rajput; Aishwarya Vullingala; Vijayachander; Rajeev Kanakala; Sameer; C. V. L. Narasimha Rao; Gautam Raju; M.S.Chowdary; Bhadram; Suman Setty	Sri Bhavnesh Productions	
J U L Y	28	Bro	Samuthirakani	Pawan Kalyan; Sai Dharam Tej; Ketika Sharma; Priya Prakash Varrier; Brahmanandam; Tanikella Bharani	People Media Factory; Zee Studios	
J U L Y	29	Okkaroju...48 Hours	Niranjan Bandi	Aditya Reddy Badveli; Rekha Nirosha	Preethi Creations	
J U L Y	29	Sakshi	Siva Kesanakurthi	Sharan Kumar; Janvir Kaur; Nagendra Babu; Indraja; Aamani	Sri Vennela Creations	
J U L Y	29	Slum Dog Husband	A. R. Sreedhar	Sanjay Rao; Raghu Karumanchi; Saptagiri; Pranavi Manukonda; Brahmaji	Mic Movies	
A U G U S T	4	Dilse	Mankhal Veerendra	Abhinav Medishetti; Sasha Singh; Lovely Singh; Vismaya Sri	Sairam Creations	
A U G U S T	4	Krishna Gadu Ante Oka Range	Rajesh Dondapati	Rishwi Thimmaraju; Vismaya Sri	Sri Tejas Productions Pvt. Ltd.	
A U G U S T	4	Mistake	Bharrath Komalapati	Abhinav Sardhar; Ajay Kathurvar; Sujith Kumar; Teja Ainampudi; Karishma Kumar	Abhinav Sardhar Productions	
A U G U S T	4	Rajugari Kodipulao	Shiva Kona	Shiva Kona; Neha Deshpande; Prachi Thaker; Prabhakar Podakandla	Anil Moduga Films & Kona Cinema	
A U G U S T	11	Bhola Shankar	Meher Ramesh	Chiranjeevi; Tamannaah; Keerthy Suresh; Sushanth; Murali Sharma; Rao Ramesh; Vennela Kishore; Shawar Ali; P. Ravi Shankar; Raghu Babu; Tulasi Shivamani; Pragathi; Sreemukhi; Bithiri Sathi; Satya Akkala; Rashmi Gautam; Uttej	AK Entertainments; Creative Commercials	
A U G U S T	12	Ustaad	Phanideep	Sri Simha Koduri; Kavya Kalyanram; Gautham Vasudev Menon; Anu Hassan; Venkatesh Maha	Krishi Entertainments	
A U G U S T	18	Jilebi	K. Vijaya Bhaskar	Sree Kamal; Shivani Rajashekar; Rajendra Prasad; Murli Sharma	Anju Asrani Kreations	
A U G U S T	18	Madhilo Madhi	Prakash Palla	Jai Nemukuri; Sweety Swathi; Srinivasa Rao Palla; Siri Ravulachari	SKLM Creations	
A U G U S T	18	Mr. Pregnant	Srinivas Vinjanampati	Syed Sohel; Roopa Koduvayur; Suhasini Maniratnam; Raja Ravindra; Brahmaji	Mic Movies	
A U G U S T	18	Prem Kumar	Abhishek Maharshi	Santosh Sobhan; Rashi Singh; Krishna Chaitanya; Ruchitha Sadineni	Sharanga Entertainment	
A U G U S T	25	Bedurulanka 2012	Clax	Kartikeya Gummakonda; Neha Shetty; Ajay Ghosh; Vennela Kishore	Loukya Entertainments	
A U G U S T	25	Daksha	Vivekananda Vikranth	Thallada Saikrishna; Aayush Tejas; Kota Nakshatra; Ayra Anu		
A U G U S T	25	Em Chesthunnav?	Bharath Mithra	Vijay Rajkumar; Neha Pathan; Amitha Ranganath; Aamani; Rajiv Kanakala	NVR Production	
A U G U S T	25	Gandeevadhari Arjuna	Praveen Sattaru	Varun Tej; Sakshi Vaidya; Vinay Rai; Vimala Raman; Narein	Sri Venkateswara Cine Chitra	
A U G U S T	25	Nene Naa	Caarthick Raju	Regina Cassandra; Akshara Gowda; Vennela Kishore	Apple Tree Studios	
A U G U S T	25	Rent (Not For Sale)	Raguvardhan Reddy	Amit Tiwari; Vanitha Reddy; Manisha Jashnani; Bhel Prasad	Jagruthi Movie Makers; Ramnath Mudoraj Movies	
S E P T E M B E R	1	Kushi	Shiva Nirvana	Vijay Deverakonda; Samantha; Murali Sharma; Vennela Kishore; Rahul Ramakrishna; Pujita Ponnada; Ali; Rohini; Sharanya Pradeep	Mythri Movie Makers	
S E P T E M B E R	2	Prema Deshapu Yuvarani	Sai Suneel Nimmala	Yamin Raaz; Viraat Karthik; Priyanka Rewri	Age Creations; S2h2 Entertainments	
S E P T E M B E R	7	Miss Shetty Mr Polishetty	Mahesh Babu P.	Naveen Polishetty; Anushka Shetty; Murali Sharma; Nasser; Jayasudha	UV Creations	
S E P T E M B E R	8	Govindaa Bhaja Govindaa	Surya Karthikeya	Surya Teja; Priya Srinivas; Kamal Teja Narla	Vijayashree Creations	
S E P T E M B E R	8	Thurum Khanlu	Nakinamoni Shivakalyan	Shreeram Nimmala; Palamuru Devaraj; Ishwarya Vullingala; Avinash Chowdary	KK Cinemas	
S E P T E M B E R	15	Changure Bangaru Raja	Sathish Varma	Karthik Rathnam; Goldie Nissy; Nithya Sree	RT Team Works	
S E P T E M B E R	15	Ramanna Youth	Abhay Bethiganti	Abhay Bethiganti; Thagubothu Ramesh; Anil Geela	Firefly Arts	
S E P T E M B E R	15	Sodara Sodarimanulara	Raghupati Reddy	Kamal Kamaraju; Aparna Devi; Kalakeya Prabhakar	IR Movies	
S E P T E M B E R	22	Ashtadigbandhanam	Baba P. R.	Surya Bharath Chandra; Vishika Kota; Ranjith Narayan; Mani Patel	MKAKA Film Production	
S E P T E M B E R	22	Cheater	Barla Narayana	Chandrakanth Dutta; Rekha Nirosha; Narendra Andekar	SRR Productions	
S E P T E M B E R	22	Matti Katha	Pavan Kadiyala	Ajay Ved; Maya Mannu; Balveer Singh	Appi Reddy Productions	
S E P T E M B E R	22	Nachinavadu	Laxman Chinna	Laxman Chinna; Kavya Ramesh; Lalitha Naik	Aenuganti Film Zone	
S E P T E M B E R	22	Nelluri Nerajana	Subramanyam Chigurupati	Aqsa Khan; Jeeva; Rayala Harischandra	Chigurupati Creations	
S E P T E M B E R	22	Oye Idiot	Venkat Kadali	Yeshwanth Yejjavarapu; Tripti Shankhdhar	Sahasra Movies; Happy Living Entertainment	
S E P T E M B E R	22	Rudramkota	Ramu Kona	Anil Arka; Vibhisha Jaanu; Alekhya Gadamboina	ARK Visualz	
S E P T E M B E R	22	Varevva Jathagallu	Satya Saladi	Boddhani Sai Pawan; Vemi Mamatha Reddy; Polla Priyanka; Posani Krishna Murali	Om Shivadhatha Creations	
S E P T E M B E R	28	Skanda: The Attacker	Boyapati Srinu	Ram Pothineni; Sree Leela	Srinivasaa Silver Screen	
S E P T E M B E R	29	Peddha Kapu 1	Srikanth Addala	Virat Karrna; Pragathi Srivatsav; Rao Ramesh; Tanikella Bharani	Dwaraka Creations	

== October–December ==
Opening		Title	Director	Cast	Production House	Ref.
O C T O B E R	6	GTA (Guns Trance Action)	Deepak Sidhanth	Chaithanya Pasupuleti; Heena Rai; Sudharshan; Srikanth Iyengar	Ashwatthama Productions	
O C T O B E R	6	Mama Mascheendra	Harsha Vardhan	Sudheer Babu; Harsha Vardhan; Eesha Rebba; Mirnalini Ravi	Srishti Celluloids	
O C T O B E R	6	Mad	Kalyan Shankar	Narne Nithin; Sangeeth Sobhan; Ram Nithin; Gouri Priya; Ankithika; Gopikaa Udyan	Sithara Entertainments; Fortune Four Cinemas	
O C T O B E R	6	Month of Madhu	Srikanth Nagothi	Naveen Chandra; Swati Reddy; Shreya Navile; Harsha Chemudu; Raja Chembolu	Krishiv Productions; Handpicked Stories	
O C T O B E R	6	Nene Saroja	Sreeman Gummadavelli	Kaushik Babu; Saanvi Meghana; Suman; Chandra Mohan	S3 Creations	
O C T O B E R	6	Rules Ranjann	Rathinam Krishna	Kiran Abbavaram; Neha Shetty; Meher Chahal; Vennela Kishore; Subbaraju	Starlight Entertainment	
O C T O B E R	6	Yendira Ee Panchayithi	Gangadhar. T	Bharath Bade; Vishika Laxman; Kasi Vishwanath	Prabhat Creations	
O C T O B E R	12	Prema Vimanam	Santosh Kata	Sangeeth Sobhan; Saanve Megghana; Anasuya Bharadwaj; Vennela Kishore; Devansh Nama; Anirudh Nama	Abhishek Pictures	
O C T O B E R	13	Tantiram	Muthyala Meher Deepak	Srikanth Gurram; Priyanka Sharma; Avinash Yelandur	Cinema Bandi	
O C T O B E R	19	Bhagavanth Kesari	Anil Ravipudi	Nandamuri Balakrishna; Kajal Aggarwal; Sree Leela; Arjun Rampal	Shine Screens	
O C T O B E R	20	Tiger Nageswara Rao	Vamsee	Ravi Teja; Anupam Kher; Jisshu Sengupta; Nupur Sanon	Abhishek Agarwal Arts	
O C T O B E R	22	Krishna Rama	Raj Madiraju	Rajendra Prasad; Gautami; Ananya Sharma Ongram	Adwitiya Movies	
O C T O B E R	27	Martin Luther King (film)	Puja Kolluru	Sampoornesh Babu; Naresh (actor); Sharanya Pradeep	Y Not Studios; Mahayana Motion Pictures	
N O V E M B E R	3	Anukunnavanni Jaragavu Konni	Gundluru Sandeep	Shreeram Nimmala; Kalapala Mounika; Saikumar Babloo	Sri Bharath Arts	
N O V E M B E R	3	Drohi - The Criminal	Vijay Das Pendurty	Sandeep Boddapati; Deepthi Varma; Shakalaka Shankar	Play World Creations, Safyrus Productions, Good Fellows Media	
N O V E M B E R	3	Keedaa Cola	Tharun Bhascker	Rag Mayur; Ravindra Vijay; Brahmanandam	VG Sainma	
N O V E M B E R	3	Krishna Ghattam	Suresh Palla	Chaitanya; Vinay Nallakadi; Sasha Singh; Maya Nelluri	Wild Virtue Creations	
N O V E M B E R	3	Maa Oori Polimera 2	Anil Vishwanath	Satyam Rajesh; Kamakshi Bhaskarla; Baladitya	Shree Krishna Productions	
N O V E M B E R	3	Midnight Killers	Raju Shetty Boyana	Ravikumar Jarupula; Bommidi Dhanashree; Aduri Durga Mohan	Sushma Vennela Creations	
N O V E M B E R	3	Narakasura	Sebastian Noah Acosta Jr.	Rakshit Atluri; Aparna Janardhan; Nassar; Charan Raj	Sumukha Creations	
N O V E M B E R	3	Okkasari Preminchaka	Srikanth Aerolla	Bunny Yadav; Ashok Pawar; Siri Nagireddy	S. L. Entertainments	
N O V E M B E R	3	Plot	Bhanu Bhava Tharaka	Vikas Muppala; Gayatri Gupta; Santhosh Nadivada		
N O V E M B E R	3	Vidhi	Srikanth Ranganathan	Rohit Nanda; Anandhi; Mahesh Achanta	No Idea Entertainment	
N O V E M B E R	10	Ala Ninnu Cheri	Maresh Shivan	Dinesh Tej; Payal Radhakrishnan; Hebah Patel	Viision Movie Makers	
N O V E M B E R	17	Anveshi	V J Khanna	Vijay Dharan; Ananya Nagalla; Simran Gupta	Aruna Sree Entertainments	
N O V E M B E R	17	Janam	Venkataramana Pasupuleti	Suman; Pragnya Nayan; Ajay Ghosh	VRP Creations	
N O V E M B E R	17	Mangalavaaram	Ajay Bhupathi	Payal Rajput; Nandita Swetha; Divya Pillai; Ravindra Vijay	Mudhra Media Works	
N O V E M B E R	17	My Name Is Shruthi	Srinivas Omkar	Hansika Motwani; Murli Sharma; Aadukalam Naren; Pooja Ramachandran; Prema	Vaishnavi Arts	
N O V E M B E R	17	Spark L.I.F.E	Vikranth Reddy	Vikranth Reddy; Mehreen Pirzada; Rukshar Dhillon	Deaf Frog Productions	
N O V E M B E R	17	Ye Chota Nuvvunna	Pasalapudi Satti Venkata	Prashanth Guravana; Ambika Multhani; Madhukar Medapati		
N O V E M B E R	24	Aadikeshava	Srikanth N. Reddy	Panja Vaisshnav Tej; Sreeleela; Aparna Das; Joju George; Sadha	Sithara Entertainments; Srikara Studios	
N O V E M B E R	24	Kota Bommali PS	Teja Marni	Srikanth; Varalaxmi Sarathkumar; Rahul Vijay; Shivani Rajashekar	N S Entertainments	
N O V E M B E R	24	Madhave Madhusudhana	Bommadevara Ramachandra Rao	Tej Bommadevara; Rishika Lokre; Jayaprakash; Naveen Neni	Sairathna Creations	
N O V E M B E R	24	Perfume	Jaligapu Durga Swamy	Che Nag; Prachi Thaker; Meghraj Ravindra; Abhinaya	Sreeman Movies	
N O V E M B E R	24	Sound Party	Sanjay Sheri	VJ Sunny; Hrithika Srinivas; Sivannarayana Naripeddi	Full Moon Media	
N O V E M B E R	24	The Trial	Raam Ganni	Spandana Palli; Vamsi Kotu; Yug Ram	SZ Films	
D E C E M B E R	1	Atharva	Mahesh Reddy	Karthik Raju; Simran Choudhary; Kabir Duhan Singh	Peggo Entertainments	
D E C E M B E R	1	Calling Sahasra	Arun Vikkirala	Sudigali Sudheer; Dollysha; Spandana Palli; Siva Balaji	Shadow Media Productions	
D E C E M B E R	1	Palle Gootiki Pandagocchindhi	Tirumalarao Kancharana	Rohit Krishna; Nikita Bisht; Suman; Saikumar Pudipeddi	Laxmi Film Productions	
D E C E M B E R	1	Upendra Gadi Adda	Aryan Subhan Shaik	Upendra Kancharla; Savithri Krishna; Kireeti Damaraju	SSLS Creations	
D E C E M B E R	2	Breathe	Vamsi Krishna Akella	Nandamuri Chaitanya Krishna; Vaidika Senjaliya	Basavatarakaram Creations	
D E C E M B E R	7	Hi Nanna	Shouryuv	Nani; Mrunal Thakur; Shruti Haasan	Vyra Entertainments	
D E C E M B E R	8	Extra Ordinary Man	Vakkantham Vamsi	Nithiin; Sreeleela; Rajasekhar; Rao Ramesh; Brahmaji	Sreshth Movies	
D E C E M B E R	15	#MayaLo	Megha Mithra Pervar	Naresh Agastya; Bhavana Vazhapandal; Gnaneswari Kandregula	FrameByFrame Pictures	
D E C E M B E R	15	Che Long Live	BR Sabawat Naik	Sabavat Balaraju; Sameera Lavanya	Nature Arts	
D E C E M B E R	15	Dalari	Gopal Reddy Kachidi	Rajiv Kanakala; Shakalaka Shankar; Aqsa Khan; Shritej	SK Pictures; Aakriti Creations	
D E C E M B E R	15	Jorugaa Husharugaa	Anu Prasad	Viraj Ashwin; Pujita Ponnada; Siri Hanumanth; Saikumar Pudipeddi	Shikaara and Akshara Arts	
D E C E M B E R	15	Kalasa: The Symbol of Abundance	Konda Rambabu	Anuraag Rajput; Sonakshi Varma; Bhanu Shree; Roshini Kamisetty		
D E C E M B E R	15	Pindam	Sai Kiran Daida	Sriram; Kushee Ravi; Easwari Rao; Srinivas Avasarala	Kalaahi Media	
D E C E M B E R	15	Thika Maka Thanda	Venkat Mallam	Hari Krishna Tirupathi; Rama Krishna Tirupathi; Rekha Nirosha; Annie Zibi	TSR Movie Makers	
D E C E M B E R	15	Sakhi	Johnny Basha	Lokesh Muthumula; Deepika Vemireddy; Divya Kanthi	One Media Et Pvt Ltd	
D E C E M B E R	15	Shantala	Seshu Babu Peddireddy	Nihal Kodhaty; Ashlesha Thakur; Vinod Kumar	Creative Commercials Supervision	
D E C E M B E R	22	Salaar: Part 1 – Ceasefire	Prashanth Neel	Prabhas; Prithviraj Sukumaran; Shruti Haasan; Jagapathi Babu	Hombale Films	
D E C E M B E R	29	Badmash Gallaki Bumper Offer	Ravi Chavali	Santhosh Kalwacherla; Indrasena; Pragya Nayan; Naveena Reddy	Tirumala Media	
D E C E M B E R	29	Bubblegum	Ravikanth Perepu	Roshan Kanakala; Maanasa Choudhary; Anu Hassan; Viva Harsha	Maheshwari Movies	
D E C E M B E R	29	Currency Nagar	Vennela Kumar Pothepalli	Gautam Kumar; Sudharshan; Mahesh Yadlapalli; Spandana Somanna	Unnathi Arts	
D E C E M B E R	29	Devil: The British Secret Agent	Abhishek Nama	Nandamuri Kalyan Ram · Samyuktha Menon · Edward Sonnenblick · Elnaaz Norouzi	Abhishek Pictures	
D E C E M B E R	29	Right	Gubaala Shankar	Kaushal Manda; Mukhtar Khan; Aamani; Leesha Eclairs		
D E C E M B E R	29	Umapathi	Satya Dwarapudi	Anuragh Konidena; Avika Gor; Posani Krishna Murali; Thulasi Shivamani	Krishi Creations	

== Highest grossing film of each month ==
Highest monthwise gross of 2023
Rank	Month	Title	Production company	Worldwide gross	Ref	Verdict
1	January					
2	February					
3	March					
4	April					
5	May					

== See also ==
- Lists of Telugu-language films
- List of Telugu films of 2022
- List of Telugu films of 2024
