= Urvashi Roy =

Indian actress

- Website: https://www.instagram.com/urvashi_offcial?igsh=NGlwMzh0enV2ODEx

Urvashi Roy (also known as Urvashi Rai) is an Indian actress who appears in Telugu, Kannada, Hindi and Punjabi films.

== Career ==
Urvashi made her acting debut with the Punjabi song "Payal," produced by the well-known Chandigarh White Hills Music Payal. The song featured Akriti Kakkar and Shivam Grover.

Her debut Kannada film Savithri featured Vijay Raghavendra. It marked a successful start to her career. The movie was well received in Theaters.

She then took on a captivating role as a spy in the Telugu film Grey: The Spy Who Loved Me, starring Ali Reza, Arvind Krishna, and Pratap Pothen. She then appeared in her next Kannada film, South Indian Hero, directed by Naresh Kumar HN, it was a huge success in theatres.

== Filmography ==
S.No.	Year	Title	Role	Language	Notes
1	2023	Savithri	Pooja	Kannada	debut Kannada film
2	2023	Grey: The Spy Who Loved Me	Aarushi Reddy/Sharma	Telugu	debut Telugu film
3	2023	South Indian Hero	Spoorthy	Kannada	
4	2023	Koushika Varma Dhamayanthi		Telugu	credited as Urvashi Roy

== Music Videos ==
S.No.	Title	Language	Notes
1	Payal	Punjabi	
