= Arvind Krishna (disambiguation) =

Arvind Krishna (born 1962) is an Indian American business executive.

Arvind Krishna may also refer to:

- Arvind Krishna (actor) (born 1985), Indian actor
- Arvind Krishna (cinematographer), Indian cinematographer
