= Kaashish Vohra =

Indian actress

- Born: New Delhi, India
- Occupations: Actress; model
- Years active: 2015–present

Kaashish Vohra is an Indian actress who primarily works in Telugu films and Hindi television. She made her acting debut in 2015 with Qubool Hai portraying Kainaat Khan. She made her film debut with the Hindi film Mr. Kabaadi and her Telugu debut with Sapthagiri LLB, both in 2017. She also portrayed Young Namrata Dutt in Sanju.

== Early life ==
Vohra was born and brought up in New Delhi. She aspired to be an actress since her childhood. During her modelling days, Vohra was part of many Ad-films including Dabur Amla's TVC with Kareena Kapoor Khan.

== Career ==
Vohra made her acting debut with Qubool Hai portraying Kainaat Khan from 2015 to 2016 opposite Shubhashish Jha. In 2016, she portrayed Ayesha in Yeh Hai Aashiqui opposite Karan Jotwani.

She made her Hindi film debut in 2017 with Mr. Kabaadi portraying Sayyali. The film met with mixed reviews. She also made her Telugu film debut in 2017 with Sapthagiri LLB opposite Sapthagiri. She portrayed Chitti in the film that received mixed reviews. She also appeared in the music video "SWAT".

Vohra made her web debut in 2018 with the Telugu series Hey Krishna portraying Satya opposite Varun Sandesh. It received positive reviews. She portrayed young Namrata Dutt in the 2018 Hindi film Sanju. It received positive reviews from critics. She also appeared in the music video "Bin Tere Sanam".

In 2019, she portrayed Shruthi in the Telugu film 1st Rank Raju opposite Chetan Maddineni. It received negative reviews. She then appeared in the music videos "Dil Tod Ke" in 2020 and "Bedardi Se Pyaar Ka" in 2021.

== Filmography ==
=== Films ===
Year	Title	Role	Language	Notes	Ref.
2017	Mr. Kabaadi	Sayyali	Hindi		
2017	Sapthagiri LLB	Chitti	Telugu		
2018	Sanju	Young Namrata Dutt	Hindi	Cameo appearance	
2019	1st Rank Raju	Shruthi	Telugu		
2024	Maa Nanna Superhero		Telugu		

=== Television ===
Year	Title	Role	Notes	Ref.
2015-2016	Qubool Hai	Kainaat Khan		
2016	Yeh Hai Aashiqui	Ayesha	Episode: "Hindu Muslim"	
2018	Hey Krishna	Satya	Telugu series	

=== Music videos ===
Year	Title	Singer(s)	Ref.
2017	SWAT	AVI J (Feat: Ayo HeartBeat)	
2018	Bin Tere Sanam	Bhoomi Trivedi, Bilal Saeed	
2020	Dil Tod Ke	B Praak	
2021	Bedardi Se Pyaar Ka	Jubin Nautiyal	
