= Vilambaram =

Vilambaram may refer to:

- Vilambaram (1987 film), an Indian Malayalam-language film
- Vilambaram (2019 film), an Indian Tamil-language film
