= Snigdha (actress) =

Indian actor

- Born: Snigdha Nayani; 15 January 1985 (age 41); Rajahmundry, Andhra Pradesh, India
- Occupations: Actress, singer, music director
- Years active: 2011–present

Snigdha is an Indian actress, music composer and playback singer. She began her career as a playback singer for Telugu films and later was noticed for her role in the film Ala Modalaindi. She has also worked in Tamil and Kannada films.

== Early life ==
Snigdha was born in Rajamahendravaram, Andhra Pradesh, to Jagadeesh, a doctor, and Rajeswari, a housewife. She pursued her MBA at CR Reddy College in Eluru. Before getting into movies, she worked as HR Manager at Logic Bytes in Hyderabad.

== Career ==
Snigdha worked as a playback singer for the film Sambhavami Yuge Yuge under the stage name Nayani.

She started her acting career with B. V. Nandini Reddy's directorial debut film, Ala Modalaindi. She played the role of Pinky, the mutual friend of the lead characters of the movie, played by Nani and Nithya Menon. She appeared in movies like Kittu Unnadu Jagratha (2017) and Oh! Baby (2019).

== Filmography ==
- Note: all films are in Telugu, unless otherwise noted.

Year	Film	Role	Notes
2011	Ala Modalaindi	Pinky	
2012	Rushi	Advocate	
2012	Mem Vayasuku Vacham	SMS Shyamala	
2012	Routine Love Story	Neetu	
2012	Dhammu	Satya's friend	
2013	Okkadine	Sujatha	
2013	Prema Ishq Kaadhal	Snigdha	
2013	Anthaka Mundu Aa Tarvatha	Jigesha	
2013	Priyathama Neevachata Kusalama	Snigdha	
2013	Prema Ishq Kaadhal	Snigdha	
2014	Yennamo Yedho	Pinky	Tamil film
2014	Chandamama Kathalu	Bar waitress	
2015	Basti	Snigdha	
2015	Ketugadu	Lady Don	
2015	Tiger	Ganga's friend	
2015	Jatha Kalise	Driver Bangaram	
2015	Bandipotu	Guide	
2016	Guntur Talkies	Pistol Pooja	
2016	Bhale Jodi	Pinky	Kannada film
2016	Kalyana Vaibhogame	Alliance	
2016	Selfie Raja		
2017	Kittu Unnadu Jagratha	Janaki's friend	
2017	PSV Garuda Vega	Hacker	
2017	Okka Kshanam	Snigdha	
2017	B.Tech Babbulu	Allam Sridevi	
2018	Vijetha	Manager	
2018	Ego	Gopi's Friend	
2018	2 Friends		
2018	Evanukku Engeyo Matcham Irukku	Don	Tamil film
2019	Oh! Baby	Vikram's assistant	
2021	Deyyamtho Sahajeevanam		

=== Television ===
Year	Title	Role	Network	Notes
	Okkare	Participant	ETV	
	Okkare Little Stars	Anchor	ETV	
2021	You Avakay Me Ice Cream		aha	Web series

== Discography ==
=== As playback singer ===
Year	Film	Song	Composer	Notes	Ref.
	Nijamga	Title song	Bunty Gadicherla	Television serial	
2006	Sambhavami Yuge Yuge	"Vela Vela Kaantulanni"	Anil	credited as Nayani N.	
2011	Madura Meenakshi	"Vennello Kannullo"	Raja Vamsi	Unreleased film	
2012	Rushi	"Premane Prematho"	Snigdha; Don-Chandran		
2012	Rushi	"Damn It"	Snigdha; Don-Chandran		
2012	Rushi	"Chaduvey Chaduvu"	Snigdha; Don-Chandran		
2012	Rushi	"Oh Chocoman Nenani"	Snigdha; Don-Chandran		
2012	Rushi	"No Goodbyes"	Snigdha; Don-Chandran		
2012	Rushi	"Manase Himamai"	Snigdha; Don-Chandran		
2012	Rushi	"Nishabdhamantha"	Snigdha; Don-Chandran		
2019	Vantha Rajavathaan Varuven	"Red Cardu"	Hiphop Tamizha	Tamil song	

=== As composer ===
Year	Title	Notes	Ref.
2009	Allam Velluli	Unreleased movie	
2012	Rushi		

== Award ==
Snigdha won the Nandi Award for Best Female Comedian for the year 2015 for the movie Jatha Kalise.
