= Rushi (film) =

Indian Telugu-language medical drama film

- Official poster
- Directed by: Raj Madiraju
- Written by: Raj Madiraju
- Produced by: Ramesh Prasad
- Starring: Arvind Krishna; Supriya Shelja; Master Gaurav; Ravi Prakash
- Cinematography: Tribhuvan Babu
- Edited by: A. Sreekar Prasad
- Music by: Snigdha; Don-Chandran
- Production company: Prasad Productions
- Release date: 9 February 2012
- Country: India
- Language: Telugu

Rushi is a 2012 Indian Telugu-language medical drama film directed by Raj Madiraju and starring Arvind Krishna, Supriya Shelja, Master Gaurav and Ravi Prakash.

The film is produced by Prasad Productions, which was founded by L. V. Prasad. Raj Madiraju and Ramesh Prasad won the Nandi Award for Best Story Writer and the Nandi Special Jury Award, respectively for this film.

== Cast ==
- Arvind Krishna as Rishi
- Supriya Shelja as Pooja
- Master Gaurav as Karthik
- Ravi Prakash as Venkat
- Suresh as Professor Lakshmipati
- Ranganath as the judge
- C. V. L. Narasimha Rao as an advocate
- Snigdha as an advocate
- Sanjay Raichura as a medical professor
- Solomon Pagadala as Rishi's friend

== Soundtrack ==
The music was composed by Snigha and the duo Don-Chandran. The lyrics were written by Krishna Chinni. The audio was released through Aditya Music.

== Reception ==
A critic from The Times of India wrote that "the director deserves a pat on the back for attempting a novel subject, and a socially relevant theme even if he only managed to partially pull it off". A critic from Rediff.com said that "Rushi has a meaningful theme. The film should be appreciated for tackling a different subject and a significant theme".
