= Dhoom Dhaam (2024 film) =

2024 Indian Telugu language film

- Directed by: Sai Kishore
- Written by: Gopi Mohan
- Screenplay by: Gopi Mohan
- Story by: Gopi Mohan
- Produced by: M. S. Ram Kumar
- Starring: Chetan Maddineni; Hebah Patel; Vennela Kishore; P. Sai Kumar
- Cinematography: Siddharth Ramaswamy
- Music by: Gopi Sundar
- Production company: Friday Frameworks
- Distributed by: Mythri Movie Makers
- Release date: 8 November 2024
- Running time: 147 minutes
- Country: India
- Language: Telugu

Dhoom Dhaam is a 2024 Indian Telugu-language romantic comedy film written and directed by Sai Kishore. It was produced by M. S. Ram Kumar under Friday Fareworks. The film features Chetan Maddineni and Hebah Patel in the lead roles, with P. Sai Kumar, Vennela Kishore, Goparaju Ramana, and Benarjee playing prominent roles. The film is released on 8 November 2024.

== Plot ==
The story follows Karthik (Chetan Maddineni), who falls in love with Suhana (Hebba Patel) at first sight. Despite his efforts, she initially rejects him. However, their paths cross again when they travel together to Poland. Karthik decides to end his relationship with another girl to prove his dedication to Suhana. As their relationship begins to develop, they face a major obstacle in the form of an old family feud. Suhana’s family harbors resentment toward Karthik’s father due to a past conflict. As Karthik and Suhana work through these issues, they come to realize the importance of love, and the value of family bond.

== Cast ==
- Chetan Maddineni as Karthik
- Hebah Patel as Suhana
- P. Sai Kumar as Ramaraju, Karthik’s father
- Shanti Devagudi as Shanti, Karthik’s mother
- Vennela Kishore as Suhas, Karthik’s cousin
- Vinay Varma as Maheshwara Bhupathi, Suhana’s father
- Goparaju Ramana as Neelakantha Bhupathi, Suhana’s uncle
- Banerjee as Mahendra Bhupathi, Suhana’s uncle
- Meena Vasu as Suma, Suhana’s aunt
- Praveen as Dinare, Karthik’s friend
- Naveen Neni as Karthik’s friend
- Harshini Koduru as Sruthi, Karthik’s wedding alliance
- Ramajogayya Sastry as Chicago Subbarao, Sruthi’s father
- Satya Krishnan as Sruthi’s mother
- Sivannarayana Naripeddi as Vittal Rao, Ramaraju’s friend
- Prudhvi Raj as Phani Sharma, Astrologer
- Bhadram as Phani Sharma’s assistant
- Vadlamani Srinivas as Suhas’s father
- Giridhar Vajja as Suri, Suhana’s family-helper
- Tarzan Laxminarayana as Warangal Satthi, Neelakantha Bhupathi’s rival
- Chitram Srinu as Warangal Satthi’s assistant
- Sarah Somasundar as Potti, Suhana’s friend and Dinare’s love-interest
- Rathika Rose as Simmi, Suhana’s friend
- Ananth Babu as Priest
- Rajitha as a Wedding Dancer
- Duvvasi Mohan as Security Incharge Dastagiri
- Gundu Sudarshan as a Tenant
- Mangli as Herself in "Mallepoola Taxi" song (Cameo appearance)

== Sound track ==
Dhoom dhaam

Soundtrack album by Gopi Sundar
- Released: 28 August 2024
- Recorded: 2023–24
- Genre: Feature film soundtrack
- Length: 20:59
- Language: Telugu
- Label: T Series

Official audio
- Audio Jukebox on YouTube

The film's soundtrack album and background score were composed by Gopi Sundar. The audio rights were acquired by T-Series.

No.	Title	Lyrics	Singer(s)	Length
1.	"Mallepoola Taxi"	Ramajogayya Sastry	Mangli, Sahithi Chaganti	4:28
2.	"Maya Sundari"	Ramajogayya Sastry	Anurag Kulkarni	3:43
3.	"Tomato Buggala Pilla"	Ramajogayya Sastry	Sri Krishna, Geetha Madhuri	4:31
4.	"Kundanala Bomma"	Ramajogayya Sastry	Sri Krishna	4:24
5.	"Manasuna Manasu Nuvve"	Ramajogayya Sastry	Vijay Yesudas, Harini Ivaturi	4:33
Total length:				20:59

== Release ==
The film released theatrically on 8 November 2024.

== Reception ==
Bhargav Chaganti of NTV gave 2.5/5 stars and stated "The film’s first half centers on romance between the hero and heroine, but shifts to an exaggerated family wedding in the second half. While the climax is predictable, the comedy keeps the audience engaged".

Jeevi of Idlebrain.com rated the film 2.5/5 stars and wrote "Dhoom Dhaam sticks closely to the typical Sreenu Vaitla formula, featuring catchy songs and Vennela Kishore’s comedy, which adds energy to the second half. While the plot is routine, its broad appeal may resonate with a wide audience".

Sakshi TV gave 2.75/5 stars and stated "The film is technically well-produced, with Gopi Sundar’s music adding to its impact, particularly through a Mangli song at the end. The cinematography showcases Poland’s landscapes, and high production values reflect producer Ram Kumar’s focus on quality".

The Hans India gave the film 3/5 stars and wrote "Dhoom Dhaam is a romantic comedy that mixes humor, emotion, and competent performances, providing an engaging and entertaining experience. The film presents a lighthearted narrative with elements of both comedy and drama, making it an approachable choice for a casual movie outing".

Aithagoni Raju of Asianet News gave 2.75/5 stars and wrote "Dhoom Dham is a family-friendly romantic comedy that blends love, emotion, and humor, with a focus on clean entertainment and relatable family bonds".

10TV gave the film 2.75/5 stars and wrote "Dhoom Dham follows a familiar rom-com formula, centered on father-son relationships, with a mix of comedy, strong performances, and a wedding-based climax, all while sticking to a traditional storyline".
