= Radha Kalyana =

Indian television series

- Genre: Soap opera Drama
- Directed by: Naveen Krishna
- Starring: Amith Kashyap; Radhika Rao; Anusha Rai
- Country of origin: India
- Original language: Kannada
- No. of episodes: 190

Production
- Camera setup: Multi-camera
- Running time: 22 minutes
- Production company: Dhriti Creations

Original release
- Network: Zee Kannada
- Release: 15 July 2019 – 3 April 2020

Related
- Maate Mantramu

Radha Kalyana is an Indian Kannada language television series which aired on Zee Kannada. It stars Radhika Rao and Amith Kashyap in lead roles. It premiered from 15 July 2019 by replacing Jodi Hakki. This series is an official remake of Zee Telugu series Maate Mantramu. This show abruptly stopped on 3 April 2020 due to COVID-19 pandemic.

== Synopsis ==
The story revolves around a beautiful love story of a simple girl and a man, who is known for his arrogant attitude. How the girl turns the man into a better human being, forms the crux of the story.

== Cast ==
- Amith Kashyap as Krishna
- Radhika Rao as Radha
- Anusha Rai as Nakshatra

== Adaptations ==
Language	Title	Original release	Network(s)	Last aired	Notes
Telugu	Maate Mantramu మాటే మంత్రము	7 May 2018	Zee Telugu	21 August 2020	Original
Kannada	Radha Kalyana ರಾಧಾ ಕಲ್ಯಾಣ	15 July 2019	Zee Kannada	3 April 2020	Remake
Tamil	Gokulathil Seethai கோகுலத்தில் சீதை	4 November 2019	Zee Tamil	14 May 2022	Remake
