= Rojulu Marayi (2016 film) =

2025 Indian Telugu-language film by Murali Krishna Mudidani

- Theatrical release poster
- Directed by: Murali Krishna Mudidani
- Screenplay by: Maruthi
- Story by: Maruthi
- Produced by: G. Srinivas Rao
- Starring: Chetan Maddineni; Kruthika Jayakumar; Parvateesam; Tejaswi Madivada
- Cinematography: Balreddy Patlolla
- Edited by: Uddhav SB
- Music by: JB
- Production companies: Maruthi Talkies; Good Cinema Group
- Distributed by: Sri Venkateswara Creations
- Release date: 1 July 2016
- Running time: 131 minutes
- Country: India
- Language: Telugu

Rojulu Marayi is a 2016 Indian Telugu-language comedy drama film directed by Murali Krishna Mudidani and written by Maruthi. The film features Chetan Maddineni, Kruthika Jayakumar, Parvateesam and Tejaswi Madivada in lead roles.

The film was released on 1 July 2016.

== Cast ==
- Chetan Maddineni as Aswadh
- Kruthika Jayakumar as Aadhya
- Parvateesam as Peter
- Tejaswi Madivada as Rambha
- Ali
- Posani Krishna Murali
- Raja Ravindra as S. Ravi Kumar
- Vasu Inturi as Vibhoothi
- Jabardasth Apparao
- Shashank Mouli
- Raj Swaroop
- Ravipalli Rambabu
- Sandhya Janak

== Release ==
Rojulu Marayi was released on 1 July 2016. It was later streamed on Amazon Prime Video.

== Reception ==
Suresh Kavirayani of Deccan Chronicle gave a mixed review and was critical about story, screenplay and narartion.
