= 1st Rank Raju (2019 film) =

2019 Telugu comedy film remake of Kannada movie by the same title

- Theatrical release poster
- Directed by: Naresh Kumar HN
- Written by: Naresh Kumar HN
- Produced by: Manjunath VK
- Starring: Chetan Maddineni; Kaashish Vohra
- Music by: Kiran Ravindranath
- Production company: Dolphin Entertainment
- Release date: 21 June 2019
- Country: India
- Language: Telugu

1st Rank Raju is a 2019 Indian Telugu comedy-drama film written and directed by Naresh Kumar HN and produced by Manjunath VK. The film is a remake of the director's own 2015 Kannada film of the same name. The music director Kiran Ravindranath. The release date is 21 June 2019. It stars Chetan Maddineni and Kaashish Vohra in lead roles.

The screenplay explores the importance of academic qualification and the parental belief that only academic achievements result in a successful life.

== Plot ==
Shobhan Babu decides to raise his son Raju to become a topper. Throughout his childhood, Raju is indoctrinated with the belief that general knowledge is worthless before book knowledge. He becomes a topper throughout school and college but lacks common sense and social skills.

Nevertheless, a girl named Shruthi becomes interested in him and takes him out on dates. Shruthi confesses her feelings for Raju one month later, but the latter scorns her because he is obsessed with obtaining first rank.

During a campus placement, one of the interviewers, Mr. Parthasarathy, rejects Raju, highlighting the latter's neurotic personality.

Raju is dejected, and his father vows to transform him into a trendy guy. To that end, his parents prepare a list of activities he has to do before graduating. Consequently, Raju befriends delinquent students, and Shruthi once more loves him. However, he is conflicted about cheating all of them to get a job.

To complete the final activity, which is getting Shruthi to propose to Raju, his parents plan a fake birthday party. However, some delinquents, jealous of Raju, engineer an unfavorable situation which leads to conflicts. Afterward, they expose the schemes of Raju's parents, and Raju falls out of favor.

Disillusioned by the series of events, Raju realizes that friendship and love are not syllabus, but sentiments that should not be toyed with. He sheds his image and decides to travel alone while exploring the world around him. One day, while relaxing near a river, Raju witnesses a young boy attempting suicide. Raju rushes the boy to the hospital, but the latter dies en route. The boy's suicide note states that he was interested in cricket, but everyone around him pushed him to study against his will. Raju confronts the school principal and has an altercation with him, gaining media attention. In the end, Raju states that education is not a business and that life's lessons are extremely important.

Raju returns and reconciles with his friends. He turns down Parthasarathy's job offer but thanks him for inspiring him. Many years later, Raju and Shruthi are married. He watches a man pointing at a company campus and telling his son to achieve the first rank so that he may earn a place there. Raju approaches the boy and tells him that while hard work may earn him a job, following his heart will earn him an entire business. The father tells Raju not to say such things, but Raju points out that he owns the company before him.

== Cast ==
- Chetan Maddineni as 1st Rank Raju
- Kaashish Vohra as Shruthi
- Amit as Nandu
- Ramya Pasupuleti as Jessie
- Prakash Raj as CEO Parthasarathy
- Rao Ramesh as School Principal
- Vennela Kishore as Bollywood Bobby
- Brahmanandam as Psychiatrist Manormani
- Naresh as Karampudi Shobhan Babu, Raju's father
- Rajashree as Raju's mother
- Posani Krishna Murali as Principal, Visvesvaraya College of Engineering
- Priyadarshi as Chintu
- Naveen Neni as Mahesh
- Tanikella Bharani as Coordinator
- Nagineedu as Educational Minister
- Gundu Sudarshan as Subba Rao
- Uppada Parvateesam
- Mahaboob Basha
- Fish Venkat as Goon

== Production ==
Dolphin Entertainment is an Indian production company, which was established by Manjunath V Kandkur in 2014. The Production house's first film was First Rank Raju. The film was released in 2015 and ran for 100 successful days. Their second production is this remake of First Rank Raju in Telugu.

== Soundtrack ==
The film's soundtrack was composed by Kiran Ravindranath and the lyrics by Vanamali.

1st Rank Raju

Soundtrack album by Kiran Ravindranath
- Released: 13 April 2019
- Recorded: 2019
- Genre: Feature Film Soundtrack
- Label: Mango Music
- Producer: Manjunath VK

Track listing
No.	Title	Singer(s)	Length
1.	"1st Rank Raju Title Song"	Vyasaraja Sosale
2.	"Ayyo Rama"	Sunidhi Chauhan, Yazin Nizar
3.	"Nuvve Nijam Nuvve Kala"	Anwesha Dutt
4.	"Chalo Re Chalo"	Tippu, Deepu
5.	"Aa Ghaghananiki Meghame Thodu"	Mohit Chauhan
Total length:			19:33
