= Sontha Vooru (2009 film) =

- Directed by: P. Sunil Kumar Reddy
- Produced by: Y Ravindra Babu; Kishore Basireddy
- Starring: Raja; Theertha; L.B. Sriram
- Cinematography: Sabu James
- Edited by: Sri Guha
- Music by: Saketh Sairam
- Production company: Sravya Productions
- Release date: 21 March 2009
- Running time: 120 mins
- Country: India
- Language: Telugu

Sontha Vooru (English: Native village) is a 2009 Indian Telugu-language drama film directed by P. Sunil Kumar Reddy and starring Raja, Theertha, and L.B. Sriram. The film was screened at several film festivals like the Mumbai Film Festival and the Pune International Film Festival. The film received four Nandi Awards.

Sontha Vooru is a film about rural life and how the innocent villagers are continuously exploited by the development plans of the government. The film portrays the Special economic zone victims and its impact on normal life.

== Cast ==
- Raja as Bujjigadu
- Theertha as Malli
- L. B. Sriram as Rudrudu
- Jeeva as Naidu
- Vijayachander as Reddy
- Tanikella Bharani as Devudu Babu
- Dheer Charan Srivastav as Car mechanic
- M. S. Narayana
- Jaya Prakash Reddy
- Rallapalli

== Accolades ==
=== Awards ===
Nandi Awards of 2009

- Best Feature Film
- Best Actress - Thirtha
- Best Character Actor - L.B. Sriram
- Best Dialogue Writer - L.B. Sriram

=== Screening ===
The film was screened at following film festivals:

- 11th Mumbai Film Festival
- 8th Pune International Film Festival
- 14th International Film Festival of Kerala
