= Pallavi Ramisetty =

Indian actress

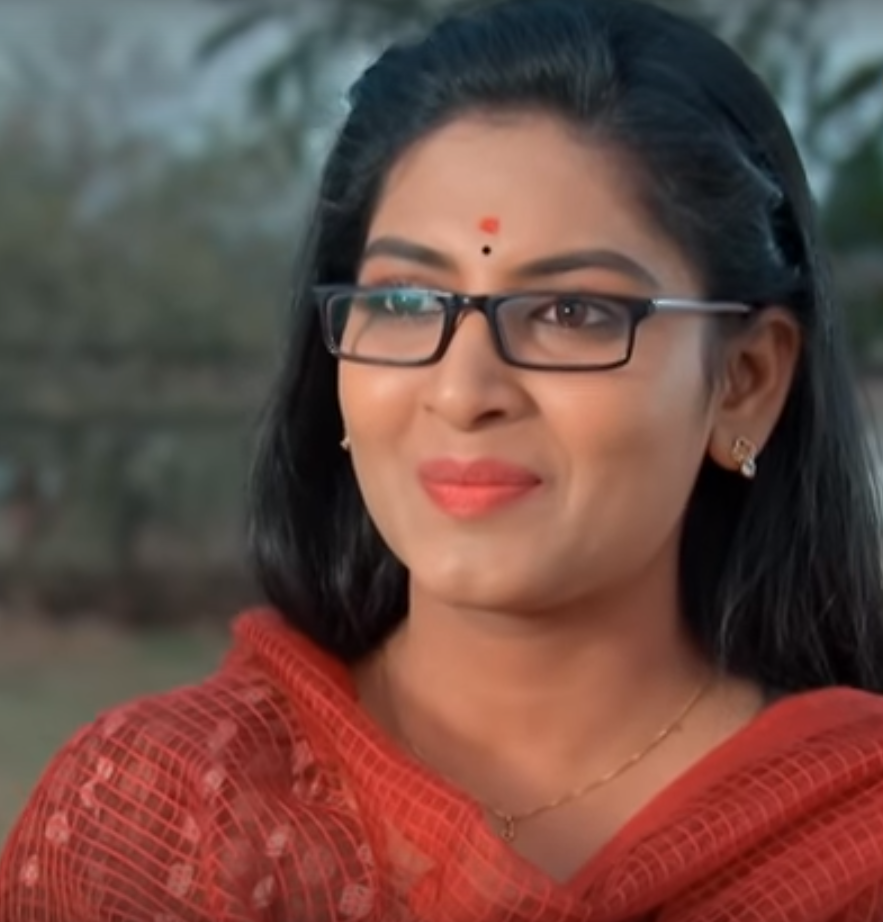
- Ramisetty in a scene of Aadade Aadharam
- Born: 11 October 1993 (age 32); Avanigadda, Andhra Pradesh, India
- Occupation: Actress
- Years active: 2006–present
- Spouse: Dilip Kumar (m. 2019)

Pallavi Ramisetty is an Indian actress who appears in Telugu television shows. She made her first appearance with Rangula Kala show on ETV. She rose to fame with the serials Bharyamani and Aadade Aadharam. She won a Nandi Award for Best Television Actress for her appearance in Bharyamani.

== Filmography ==
=== Television ===
Year	Title	Network	Role	Notes
2006	Rangula Kala	ETV		
2009–2014	Bharyamani	ETV	Alekhya, Anuradha	
2009–2020	Aadade Aadharam	ETV	Amrutha	
2014–2022	Attarintiki Daredi	ETV	Krishnaveni	
2018–2020	Maate Mantramu	Zee Telugu	Vasundhara	
2021–2023	Paape Maa Jeevanajyothi	Star Maa	Jyothi	
2024–present	Intinti Ramayanam	Star Maa	Avani	

== Awards ==
- 2011: Nandi Award for Best Television Actress for Bharyamani
