= Ram NRI =

Telugu language movie

- Theatrical release poster
- Directed by: N Lakshmi Nanda
- Written by: N Lakshmi Nanda
- Produced by: Muvva Satyanarayana
- Starring: Ali Reza; Sitanarayan; Vijayachander; Muvva Satyanarayana
- Cinematography: Nagababu Karra
- Music by: Shravan
- Production company: Muvva Creations
- Distributed by: SMK Films
- Release date: 26 July 2024
- Country: India
- Language: Telugu

Ram NRI is a 2024 Indian Telugu language family drama film written and directed by N. Lakshmi Nanda. Produced by Muvva Satyanarayana under the banner Muvva Creations, the film stars Ali Reza, Sitanarayan, and Vijaychander in lead roles. The music is composed by Shravan, while the cinematography is handled by Nagababu Karra.

== Plot ==
Ram is living in America as an NRI, and is the only son of Srinivas and Sana. Despite having his parents, he feels isolated because his parents are running Viswa Bharathi Association and are busy in promoting Indian Culture in America. Feeling neglected by his parents, Ram travels to India to spend time with his grandfather and grandmother. In India he meets Sravani, who is working as a bank employee, and falls in love with her.

When Ram gets into a fight with his uncle, he discovers shocking facts about his parents and grand parents. What the revelation about his parents' past is, and how the revelation made him realize that happiness is not in money, and how his love relationship with Sravani turned out to be forms the rest of the story.

== Cast ==
- Ali Reza
- Sitanarayan
- Vijaychander
- Geethanjali
- Muvva Satyanarayana
- Shanoor Sana
- Surya
- Jayavani

== Soundtrack ==
Ram NRI

Film score by Shravan
- Released: 2024
- Genre: Feature film soundtrack
- Language: Telugu
- Label: Mango Music
- Producer: Shravan

Shravan chronology
Mr. Pregnant (2023)	Ram NRI (2024)

The music and background score is composed by Shravan.

No.	Title	Lyrics	Singer(s)	Length
1.	"Tellavaare Velugulona"	Yemineni Ramanjaneyulu	L. V. Revanth	3:07
2.	"Prema Jabili"	Yemineni Ramanjaneyulu	B Shravan, Nutana Mohan	3:14
3.	"Neeli Gaganamlona"	Yemineni Ramanjaneyulu	Hemachandra, Ramya Behara	3:36
4.	"Amalapuram Abbayilu"	Yemineni Ramanjaneyulu	Mohana Bhogaraju	3:12
5.	"Ee Roje Maa Mungita Virise"	Yemineni Ramanjaneyulu	B Shravan, Nutana Mohan	2:41
Total length:				15:50

== Release ==
The film's first song 'Tellavaare Velugullona' was released on 21 July 2024. The film's first poster was released on 1 April 2016. Ram NRI was released theatrically on 26 July 2024.

== Reception ==
Suhas Sistu from The Hans India gave the film 3/5 stars and stated that "Overall, Ram NRI offeres a heartfelt experience with strong performances and a meaningful message about family and relationships."

Nelki Naresh Kumar from the Hindustan Times gave the film 2.5/5 stars and stated that "Ali Reza's performance as Ram is ok. As an NRI who came to a village in India, he made us emotional while also making us laugh."

A critic from Zeenews gave the film 2.75/5 stars and stated that "The director's brilliance can be seen in the way the movie carries a social message. Shravan's music is good, and cinematography is average."

A critic from News18 gave the film 2.5/5 stars and stated that "Despite the slower pace in the narration, the director conveyed the message well. Even though the screenplay feels predictable at times, the director managed to touch the audience's emotions."
