= Aadade Aadharam =

Indian television series

- Genre: Soap opera
- Starring: Pallavi Ramisetty
- Country of origin: India
- Original language: Telugu
- No. of episodes: 3,329

Production
- Running time: Approx. 22 minutes

Original release
- Network: ETV
- Release: 26 January 2009 – 14 March 2020

Aadade Aadharam is an Indian Telugu-language soap opera that aired on ETV. It aired from Monday to Saturday on afternoons. It premiered on 26 January 2009 and is the third longest-running Indian television soap opera after Yeh Rishta Kya Kehlata Hai and Abhishekam. It had a total of 3329 episodes with last episode aired on 14 March 2020.

== Plot ==
The show is about a woman who goes on with her life despite facing several issues. The female lead is Amrita, who is a professional Lawyer.

Vikas, a criminal, plans to abduct a rich girl named Renuka but his plan is foiled when his friends abducts Amrita, mistaking her for Renuka.

Next day, when she returns to the hostal, she was questioned for spending night outside of the 'Lakshmana Rekha' drawn around her. She becomes victim of misunderstanding. Spunned by even her parents, her tale of misery begins.

Despite these circumstances, she continues to move forward in life. She demonstrates resilience and confronts criminal elements, including Vikas.

The story progresses through different characters with whom she interacts. She continues her fight against criminals by supporting her clients and seeking justice for them. Despite all the hurdles she faces she holds on to her morals and faces all the challenges and difficulties with courage.

The story then turns towards Archana, who's Amrita's lookalike, their rift and sacrifice Amrita did for Archana.

The story then revolves around Amrutha's daughter Amulya. Amrita gives birth to Amulya and dies leaving the new born alone in the village outskirts. Ramakrishna adopts her and raises her like his own dad. The story then revolves around her marriage.

The story then takes a leap and starts with Archana's daughter Arpita, who wanted to become an IAS officer and craving for her father's validation and acceptance. The story revolves around how Arpita fights with the society and the challenges she faces while fulfilling her duties.

== Cast ==
- Pallavi Ramisetty as Lawyer Amrutha, Amulya's mother
  - Archana, Amrutha's lookalike, wife of Rahul and mother of Arpita
  - Amulya, Parthu's wife, daughter of Amrutha
  - Arpita, a brave IAS officer, daughter of Archana and Rahul, wife of Phalgun IPS
- Madhulika
- Madhu
- Rajasri Reddy
- Sujatha Reddy
- Sadhana
- Sindhura
- Lakshmi Sri
- Sobha
- Amulya
- Deepti
- Aditya
- Sindhura Dharshanam
- Divya Deepika as Vaijayanthi

== See also ==
- List of longest-running Indian television series
