= Mr. Kabaadi =

- Directed by: Seema Kapoor
- Written by: Seema Kapoor
- Screenplay by: Seema Kapoor
- Produced by: Anup Jalota, Rakesh Gupta, Dinesh Gupta, Om Chhangani
- Starring: Om Puri; Annu Kapoor; Vinay Pathak; Sarika; Brijendra Kala; Rajveer Singh; Kaashish Vohra; Ulka Gupta; Meenal Kapoor; Swati Kaushik
- Cinematography: Veejay P Varude
- Edited by: Sanjib Datta
- Music by: Ali Ghani, Raaj-Prakash, Vishal Singer: Vikrant Bhartiya, Shaan, Madhushree, Javed ali
- Release date: 8 September 2017
- Running time: 123 minutes
- Language: Hindi

Mr. Kabaadi is a 2017 Indian Hindi-language comedy film, written and directed by Seema Kapoor. It is the last film of actor Om Puri.

== Plot ==
Mr. Kabaadi is a satirical comedy. When a kabadiwala or a scrap dealer becomes rich he flaunts his wealth. To be like other millionaires he changes his wardrobe, tries a different accent while speaking; expanding his business or hiding his ill-gotten wealth.

== Cast ==
- Om Puri as Channulal Surmewala
- Annu Kapoor as Kallu Kabadi
- Vinay Pathak as Bhuriya Madari
- Sarika as Chandani
- Kaashish Vohra as Sayali
- Ulka Gupta as Mithi
- Brijendra Kala as Rajendra Arora
- Rajveer Singh as Chaman aka Katte

== Production ==
The film is being produced by Anup Jalota, Rakesh Gupta, Dinesh Gupta of Sadhna TV and Mumbai-based businessman Om Chhangani.

== Release ==
The film was released on 8 September 2017
