= Aithe 2.0 =

Indian techno-thriller film

- Official poster
- Directed by: Raj Madiraju
- Produced by: Dr.Hemanth Vallapu Reddy; Dr.Ravi N Rathi; K.Vijaya Rama Raju
- Starring: Indraneil Sengupta; Zara Shah; Abhishek; Kartavya Sharma; Neeraj; Mrunal; Mridanjli; Dr. Srikanth
- Cinematography: Kaushik Abhimanyu
- Edited by: Karthik Palle
- Music by: Arun Chiluveru
- Production companies: Firm 9 Pictures; Planet Earth Entertainment (United States)
- Release date: 16 March 2018
- Country: India
- Language: Telugu

Aithe 2.0 is a 2018 Indian Telugu-language techno-thriller directed by Raj Madiraju. The film stars newcomers Bengali-Hindi actor Indraneil Sengupta (in his Telugu debut), Zara Shah, Abhishek, Kartavya Sharma, Neeraj, Mrunal, Mridanjli and Dr. Srikanth. The film was simultaneously shot in Hindi as Pirates 1.0; however, the Hindi version was never theatrically released. The film is a reboot of Aithe (2003).

== Cast ==
- Indraneil Sengupta as Avinash Ganguly
- Zara Shah as Esha
- Abhishek Gupta
- Kartavya Sharma
- Neeraj
- Mrunal
- Mridanjli
- Dr. Srikanth

== Soundtrack ==
Music by Arun Chilveru and songs by Naresh Iyer, Dev Negi and Rituraj.

- "Baigan" - Dev Negi
- "Ningi Pai" - Naresh Iyer
- "Ee Gaayame" - Rituraj Mohanty

== Release and reception ==
The film released on 16 March 2018.

A critic from The Hindu opined that "The interesting premise of ‘Aithe 2.0’ is undone by amateurish execution". A critic from The Times of India gave the film a rating of two-and-a-half out of five stars and stated that "On the whole, Aithe 2.0 is a good attempt by Raj Madiraju that will appeal to niche audiences". A critic from The New Indian Express wrote that "Although the plot was good, the execution falls flat".
