= Young India (film) =

Indian drama film

- Directed by: Dasari Narayana Rao
- Written by: Dasari Narayana Rao
- Produced by: K. Ramakrishna Prasad
- Starring: Dasari Narayana Rao; Pradyumna; Arvind Krishna; Soumya Bollapragada
- Cinematography: Ramana Raju
- Edited by: Gautham Raju
- Music by: M. M. Keeravani
- Production company: Siri Media
- Release date: 15 May 2010
- Country: India
- Language: Telugu

Young India is a 2010 Indian Telugu-language drama film directed by Dasari Narayana Rao and starring himself, Pradyumna, Arvind Krishna and Soumya Bollapragada with Brahmanandam in a supporting role. This film marks the film debut of Pradyumna and Arvind Krishna.

The film was released to negative reviews and was a box office failure. The film's music was considered as one of its saving graces.

== Plot ==
The film follows a group of friends—Abhi, Venky, Razzaq and Rai—who have the intention of committing suicide due to their individual problems. When Abhi, a victim of the Mutyam scandal intends to commit suicide, he learns that three of his friends are also about to commit suicide and he saves them with the help of Keerthi. They come together along with a police officer Rangayya Naidu to fight off injustice in a movement called Young India.

== Cast ==
- Dasari Narayana Rao as SP Rangayya Naidu
- Pradyumna as Abhi
- Arvind Krishna as Razzaq
- Soumya Bollapragada as Keerthi
- Brahmanandam
- Gajula Udayshankar as Kalyan
- Yarlagadda Lakshmi Prasad as Chief Minister
- AVS as A. V. S. Maniyam
- Venu Yeldandi as Mr. Jaffa
- Rocket Raghava as reporter

== Production ==
This film marked Dasari Narayana Rao's 149th film after a six year sabbatical. To find cast members for the film, he ran talent hunts through local newspapers. For the cast members, approximately 22,000 to 35,000 people applied to be in the film in Hyderabad and 640 were selected. (Note: While The New Indian Express reported that the number of applicants was 22,000. Abhinay Vaddi in an interview mentioned that the number of applicants was approximately 35,000.) Kodi Ramakrishna, Ravi Raja Pinisetty, Suresh Krissna, Relangi Narasimha Rao, Suddala Ashok Teja and Ramakrishna Prasad were assigned the task of shortlisting the candidates. Thereafter, 29 people were shortlisted as lead actors and 60 people were shortlisted for supporting roles. From there, Dasari Narayana Rao selected three people for each role and chose the right actor based on a screen test. Abhinay Vaddi—who was credited as Pradyumna in the film—was in UK at the time and decided to apply for the film due to the respect that Dasari Narayana Rao had for his grandmother Savitri. Up and until the last audition, Abhinay Vaddi kept his lineage a secret.

The film entered post-production as of April 2010.

== Soundtrack ==
The music was composed by M. M. Keeravani and features a remix of "Vandanam Abhivandanam" from Premabhishekam (1981), which was also directed by Dasari Narayana Rao.

== Release ==
Dasari Narayana Rao, who reportedly owned some theatres during the film's release, only wanted his film Young India to be shown in theaters as opposed to other films. The film was a box office failure.
