= P. Sunil Kumar Reddy =

Indian director, screenwriter and film producer

- Born: 30 November 1969 (age 56)
- Occupations: Director, Writer & Producer
- Years active: 2001 - present

P. Sunil Kumar Reddy is an Indian director, screenwriter, and film producer who works primarily in Telugu cinema. He is well known for directing critically acclaimed films such as Sontha Ooru, Gangaputrulu, Gulf, Oka Romantic Crime Katha and Oka Criminal Prema Katha. Suneel Kumar Reddy is associated with Sravya Films, a film production house in South. He is also managing director of Screenshot Infotainment Pvt Ltd. His films won 18 State Awards and participated in several international film festivals. He was awarded as best director and best dialogue writer for his film Gangaputrulu. He directed a film Nenem…Chinna Pillana? for movie mogul D. Rama Naidu under the banner of Suresh Productions. He served as a jury member for International Children's Film Festival India. He rendered his services as a guest faculty for Annapurna Film School and Ramanaidu Film School and conducted several film workshops across India.

== Early life ==
P. Suneel Kumar Reddy is a native of Alaganipadu of Potti Sriramulu Nellore district in Andhra Pradesh. He studied in Vizag, Sompeta in the northern coastal districts of Andhra Pradesh. He completed his degree in Mechanical Engineering. As he was interested in journalism, he started a magazine, Kokila, and acted as editor/publisher of it. Later on he launched an evening daily newspaper, City Roundup, in Visakhapatnam.

== Career ==
Suneel Kumar Reddy started his career with a film called Silence Please, which is a love story between deaf and mute lovers. His second movie was Hero, a children's film where he shows that both education and indulging in physical activities are important to children; this movie won three Nandi Awards. Reddy also directed a documentary called Chance, which won two Nandi Awards and was screened at the Cairo Film Festival. In 2009, Reddy released Sontha Ooru, and it was received very well by the audience and also received critical acclaim. It won Best Film of the Year, and debutant actress Tirrtha received the award for Best Actress. Gangaputrulu, a film about the fisherman community, won Reddy awards for Best Director and Best Dialogue Writer. His latest Malayalam film, Marubhoomigal, won three prestigious Kerala Critics Awards for Cinematography, Lyrics and Makeup.

Sunil Kumar Reddy returns with "Valasa," a social drama shedding light on the struggles of migrant workers endeavoring to reunite with their families amidst the nationwide lockdown induced by Covid-19.

== Filmography ==
Year	Film	Language	Director	Producer	Writer	
2001	Silence Please	Telugu	Yes	Yes	Yes	
2003	Hero	Telugu	Yes	Yes	Yes	Won three state Nandi Awards, including best children's film.
2003	Megham	Telugu	Yes	No	Yes	
2005	Chance	Telugu	Yes	Yes	Yes	Won:Nandi Award for Best Documentary Film
2006	Prayatnam	Telugu	Yes	Yes	Yes	
2007	Missing	Telugu	Yes	Yes	Yes	
2007	Best Friends	Malayalam	Yes	Yes	Yes	
2009	Sontha Ooru	Telugu	Yes	Yes	Yes	Won State Nandi Awards for Best Film and Best Dialogue Writer
2010	Gangaputrulu	Telugu	Yes	Yes	Yes	Won State Nandi Awards for Second Best Film, Best Dialogues and Best Direction.
2012	Oka Romantic Crime Katha	Telugu	Yes	Yes	Yes	
2013	Waiting for You	Telugu	Yes	Yes	Yes	
2013	Nenem…Chinna Pillana?	Telugu	Yes	No	No	
2014	Oka Criminal Prema Katha	Telugu	Yes	Yes	Yes	
2015	Miss Leelavathi	Telugu	Yes	Yes	Yes	
2017	ATM Not Working	Telugu	Yes	Yes	Yes	
2017	Gulf	Telugu	Yes	Yes	Yes	
2019	Romantic Criminals	Telugu	Yes	Yes	Yes	
2019	NTR: Kathanayakudu	Telugu	No	No	No	Acted in the role of Director Kannappa
2020	Marubhoomigal	Malayalam	Yes	Yes	Yes	
2021	Valasa	Telugu	Yes	Yes	Yes	
2021	Honey Trap	Telugu	Yes	No	Yes	
2022	Welcome to Tihar College	Telugu	Yes	Yes	Yes	
2022	Maa Nanna Naxalite	Telugu	Yes	No	Yes	
