= Oka Criminal Prema Katha =

- Directed by: P. Sunil Kumar Reddy
- Written by: P. Sunil Kumar Reddy
- Produced by: Ravindra Babu Yakkali
- Starring: Manoj Nandam; Priyanka Pallavi
- Cinematography: Sabu James FTI
- Edited by: Archana Anand
- Music by: Praveen Immadi
- Production company: Sravya Films
- Release date: 18 July 2014
- Country: India
- Language: Telugu

Oka Criminal Prema Katha is a 2014 Telugu crime fiction film written & directed by P. Sunil Kumar Reddy and produced by Ravindra Babu Yakkali on Sravya Films banner. It features Manoj Nandam, Priyanka Pallavi in the main roles.

== Plot ==
Sreenu (Manoj Nandam) is a young man, who works in a small video library in his village. One fine day, he falls for Bindu (Priyanka Pallavi) and reveals his love for her. After some days of wooing him, eventually Bindu accepts his love. Twist in the tale arises when Bindu's family leaves their village and goes to Vizag to live with her uncle (Satyanand). A depressed Sreenu follows Bindu to Vizag and finds out her address. He starts working as a canteen boy in the same college where she studies. Sreenu gets an even bigger shock as Bindu starts ignoring him in college. Depressed, he tries to commit suicide and knowing this, Bindu again comes close to him and asks him to murder a person for her. The rest of the story is whether Sreenu murdered him and why Bindu wanted that person to be murdered.

== Cast ==
- Manoj Nandam as Sreenu
- Priyanka Pallavi as Bindu
- Satyanand as Bindu's uncle

== Reception ==
The film received moderate reviews from critics. Deccan Chronicle wrote "The director’s aim is good, but the way the story has been depicted on screen is not convincing. Maybe he has targeted only college students and youth and not kept family audiences in mind. That’s why unlike his earlier films, 'Oka Criminal Prema Katha' fails to make an impact. The publicity posters and his earlier films may bring in college youth, but this film is definitely not for all." A critic from Sakshi wrote that "The best director who once made films like Sontha Ooru and Gangaputrulu has gone down many steps and is stuck in the market with a cheap film like this, it is a lifetime sorrow for the lovers of good films".
