= Gokulathil Seethai (2019 TV series) =

2019 Indian television series

- Genre: Soap opera
- Written by: Dialogues; N. Ramana Gopinath; M.R Ponn Ilango; Thiruvarur Babu
- Directed by: A.N Jaagir Usain; G. Manikanda Kumar
- Starring: Asha Gowda; Nanda Gopal
- Theme music composer: Vishal Chandrashekhar
- Opening theme: "Azhagil Oru Manavanaga"
- Composer: J. V.
- Original language: Tamil
- No. of episodes: 705

Production
- Executive producer: R. Chitra
- Producer: Loga Vani
- Cinematography: Palanikumar Maanikam; P. Kasinadhan; Thilai Govindrajan
- Camera setup: Multi-camera
- Running time: 22 minutes
- Production company: In House Production

Original release
- Network: Zee Tamil
- Release: 4 November 2019 – 14 May 2022

Gokulathil Seethai (transl. Seetha at Gokullam) is a 2019 Indian Tamil language soap opera broadcasting on Zee Tamil. It starring Asha Gowda and Nanda Gopal in the lead roles. The show premiered on 4 November 2019 and ended on 14 May 2022.

== Plot ==
Vasundhara "Vasu" from a middle-class family, worked in bouquet shop. She has mother Thulasi, stepfather Hari, younger half-sister Elakkiya and grandmother Gandhimati – a greedy and arrogant lady, who was Vasu's father's sister. She hates Vasu and her mother due to an accident that happened in past. Meanwhile, Suchitra – a rich and handicapped lady, whose first son Arjun is a playboy and irresponsible man who always is free and who does not listen to his mother, whatever she says. Arjun always does anything his aunt Pappima says. Suchitra worries about Arjun for his attitude and carelessness because of the accident happened in past. (Both accidents are related and coincide with each other)

In past, Suchitra, her husband Jaikrishna Rajashekar "JKR" (played by Jeeva Ravi), with their son young Arjun, who was about ten years old, had gone in a car to attend a function. Suchitra was pregnant with their second child at the time. As JKR drove the car, Arjun wished to drive. Suchitra did not allow Arjun but JKR convinced her and allowed Arjun to sit in front him in the driver seat to drive. On that gap, Arjun drinks a coke and that tin was stuck on the brake pedal. After some minutes JKR was unable to stop the car. Suchitra got shocked and told JKR to stop the car, but he could not work the brake. As the car moved fast, they hit an old man and collided with a tree. After some time Suchitra woke up and cried has she saw JKR was dead but Arjun and her unborn child were alive. As this incident happened, on the same day Gandhimati started to drive a car and she drove fast on the road but did not know how to stop the car. Immediately she hit an old man and he fell down on road and asked for help. Gandhimati was shocked and did not help him due to which he died. As both accidents are related and coincide with each other, because both JKR and Gandhimati hit the same old man, he is none other than Vasu's grandfather Krishnamoorthy. The story behind is young Vasu, her mother Thulasi and her grandfather was waited for bus to move from the city. That period, Vasu had only mother not father. As her grandfather gave a silver coin to Vasu to keep this coin safe. After long time the bus not came, so that Vasu's grandfather told them that he will ask somebody for the bus time, so he leaves them and went to ask. As he cross the road that time only JKR hit him by the car, so Vasu's grandfather fall down. But his good time he not got any injury and he woke up from that place and ready to move, but promptly Gandhimati hit him and again he had an accident, was injured heavily and died. As Vasu and her mother learnt this news and worried a lot, that how they will manage their life, Gandhimati's brother decided and married Vasu's mother. So that only Gandhimati hates Vasu and Suchitra worried about Arjun.

== Cast ==
=== Main ===
- Asha Gowda as Vasundhara Arjun a.k.a. "Vasu" – Arjun's secretary, she loves Arjun, turned his wife and she is the real heart-friend (2019–2022)
- Nanda Gopal as Arjun – The JKR company head, Suchitra's son and Vasu's husband (2019–2022)

=== Others ===
- Nalini as Gandhimathi (Paati): Vasu and Elakkiya's grandmother (but biologically aunt) (2019–2022)
- Aranmanai Kili Gayathri as Suchitra: JKR's wife, Arjun and Aanand's mother (2019–2022)
- Devi Teju as Indrani: JKR's sister, Suchitra's sister-in-law and Nakshatra's mother (2021–2022)
- Shankaresh Kumar as Aanand: Arjun's younger brother, Suchitra's second son, Elakkiya's love interest, Nakshatra's fiancé but he loved Meenakshi and married her (2019–2022)
- Madhumitha Illayaraja as Nakshatra: Indira's daughter, Arjun cousin, Aanand's cousin and ex-fiancée (2019–2022)
- Lasya Nagaraj (2019) / Fouziee (2020–2022) as Elakkiya (Lucky): Vasu's half-sister, Gandhimati's grand daughter and she loved Aanand
- Vaishali Thaniga as Meenakshi: Ilamaaran's younger sister, Arjun's ex-fiancée, Aanand love interest and turns his wife (2020–2022)
- Vinitha Jaganathan (2020–2021) / Sandhya Ramachandran (2021–2022) as Iniya: A thief, Arjun's fake heart-friend and became his fiancée
- Vasanth Gopinath as Utthaman: Arjun's personal assistant (2020–2022)
- Vishnukanth as Ilamaaran: A businessman, Meenakshi's brother and Vasu's ex-fiancé (2020–2022)
- Barath as Jyothimani: Gandhimathi's friend and crime partner (2019–2022)
- Baby Joyce as Thulasi: Vasu and Elakkiya's mother (2019–2022)
- Veena Venkatesh as Pappima: Arjun and Aanand's grandmother (2019–2020)
- Jeeva Ravi as Jaikrishna "JKR" Rajashekar: Arjun and Aanand's father, he died in a car accident (2019–2020)
- Vijay Krishnaraj as Krishnamoorthy: Vasu's grandfather, he died in a car accident (2019–2020)

=== Special appearance ===
- Laila as herself – She came has a guest for Arjun's marriage (2020)
- Kousalya Senthamarai as Soundharya: Ilamaaran and Meenakshi's grandmother (2020)
- Sharmila Thapa as Jennifer: A beggar and Hindi teacher of Jyothimani (2020)
- Kushboo Sundar as Dr. Mangalam – Suchitra's friend, All-rounder and a doctor (2021)
- Vaiyapuri as Varudhukutty – Mangalam's Assistant (2021)

== Adaptations ==
Language	Title	Original release	Network(s)	Last aired	Notes
Telugu	Maate Mantramu మాటే మంత్రము	7 May 2018	Zee Telugu	21 August 2020	Original
Kannada	Radha Kalyana ರಾಧಾ ಕಲ್ಯಾಣ	15 July 2019	Zee Kannada	3 April 2020	Remake
Tamil	Gokulathil Seethai கோகுலத்தில் சீதை	4 November 2019	Zee Tamil	14 May 2022	Remake
