= Nayanam =

Upcoming Telugu-language psychological thriller web series

- Genre: Psychological thriller Science fiction Mystery
- Written by: Swathi Prakash Mantripragada
- Screenplay by: Kalyan Kagitapu
- Directed by: Swathi Prakash Mantripragada
- Starring: Varun Sandesh; Priyanka Jain
- Country of origin: India
- Original language: Telugu
- No. of seasons: 1
- No. of episodes: 6

Production
- Producers: Ram Talluri; Rajani Talluri
- Cinematography: Shoeb Siddiqui
- Production company: SRT Entertainments

Original release
- Network: ZEE5
- Release: 19 February 2025

Nayanam is a 2025 Telugu-language sci-fi psychological web series written and directed by Swathi Prakash Mantripragada and stars Varun Sandesh, in his web-series debut, as an ophthalmologist whose scientific experiments become tied to questions of privacy and obsession. Priyanka Jain also plays a lead role. The supporting cast includes Uttej, Ali Reza, Rekha Nirosha, and Harish, among others. It premiered on ZEE5 on 19 December 2025.

== Premise ==
Nayanam follows Dr. Nayan, an ophthalmologist whose professional life is complicated by ethically questionable experiments conducted outside accepted medical practice. These experiments give him access to intimate details of other people's lives. Over time, his involvement deepens, and what begins as professional curiosity starts to influence his judgement, drawing him into a chain of events marked by manipulation, unexplained deaths, and long-hidden truths.

== Cast and characters ==
- Varun Sandesh as Nayan
- Uttej as Gowrishankar
- Priyanka M Jain as Madhavi
- Ali Reza as Harishchandra
- Rekha Nirosha as Kavitha
- Harish as Bose
- Mihir Talsania as Foreign Investor (Episode 2)

=== Season 1 (2025) ===
| No. | Title | Directed by | Written by | Original release date |
|---|---|---|---|---|
| 1 | "The Eye Beyond" | Swathi Prakash Mantripragada | Swathi Prakash Mantripragada | 19 December 2025 |
| 2 | "Through Her Eyes" | Swathi Prakash Mantripragada | Swathi Prakash Mantripragada | 19 December 2025 |
| 3 | "The Watcher Is Watched" | Swathi Prakash Mantripragada | Swathi Prakash Mantripragada | 19 December 2025 |
| 4 | "The Echoes Of Deceit" | Swathi Prakash Mantripragada | Swathi Prakash Mantripragada | 19 December 2025 |
| 5 | "The Door Behind The Eye" | Swathi Prakash Mantripragada | Swathi Prakash Mantripragada | 19 December 2025 |
| 6 | "The Scars Of Silence" | Swathi Prakash Mantripragada | Swathi Prakash Mantripragada | 19 December 2025 |

== Production ==
Nayanam is written and directed by Swathi Prakash Mantripragada, with screenplay credited to Kalyan Kagitapu. The series is produced by Ram Talluri and Rajani Talluri under SRT Entertainments. Ajay Arasada composed the score and Shoeb Siddiqui served as cinematographer, with editing by Venkata Krishna Chikkala.

== Release ==
ZEE5 released an official trailer in early December 2025 and the series is scheduled to release on 19 December 2025.
