= Abhinay Vaddi =

Indian actor

- Born: Chennai, India
- Occupations: Actor; Table tennis player
- Years active: 2010–2022
- Relatives: Gemini Ganesan (grandfather); Savitri (grandmother); Rekha (aunt)

Abhinay Vaddi is a former Indian actor who works in Tamil and Telugu-language films. He is also an accomplished athlete, and was a former national level table tennis player. He is currently one of the head coaches for the Canadian national team in the sport of table tennis.

== Career ==
Abhinay Vaddi made his film debut with the Telugu film Young India (2010) directed by Dasari Narayana Rao. He was set to make his Tamil debut with Vilambaram, but the delay of the film meant that the biographical film Ramanujan, based on the mathematician, was his debut film in Tamil. He was awarded the role after a series of auditions which had prominent actors from the Tamil film industry. Akin to Ramanujan, Vaddi is also good at math. Each scene was shot first in Tamil and then in English, with changes made between the versions due to the different theatrical audience. A critic from The Indian Express cited that "the highlight of the film is that it has a talented debutant playing Ramanujan to the hilt. You could see Ramanujan in Vaddi, literally, and his portrayal of the genius is nearly flawless". Vaddi played a negative cameo role in Chennai 600028 II. He also play the lead role in the unreleased film Michaelagiya Naan, which is a psychological thriller and stars Vasundhara Kashyap and Malobika Banerjee. and the unreleased Sugar starring Simran and Trisha. He is paired opposite Simran in the film .

== Personal life ==
Abhinay Vaddi's grandfather is Gemini Ganesan and his grandmother is Savithri. Abhinay was also a national level table tennis player and is a table tennis coach and trains state and national level professional athletes.

== Filmography ==
Key
†	Denotes films that have not yet been released

List of films and roles
Year	Title	Role	Language	Notes
2010	Young India	Abhi	Telugu	credited as Pradyumna
2014	Ramanujan	Srinivasa Ramanujan	Tamil; English	Bilingual film
2016	Chennai 600028 II	Ganeshan	Tamil	
2019	Vilambaram	Ashvin / Santhosh	Tamil	

=== Television ===
List of television shows
Year	Title	Role	Platform	Notes
2021–2022	Bigg Boss (Tamil season 5)	Contestant	Vijay Television	Evicted Day 77
2022	Bigg Boss Ultimate (Season 1)	Contestant	Disney+ Hotstar	Evicted Day 21

== Discography ==
List of Abhinay Vaddi playback singer credits
Year	Song	Composer	Lyrics	Co-singer(s)	Ref.
2017	"Friendship Anthem"	Praveen PDM, Rahul Mani	Aadhav Kannadasan	Premgi Amaren, MC Rude, Praveen PDM, Rahul Mani, Danny, Nikil Murugan	

== Awards and nominations ==
List of awards and nominations
Year	Award	Category	Work	Result	Ref.
2015	4th SIIMA Awards	Best Debut Actor	Ramanujan	Nominated	
2015	9th Vijay Awards	Best Debut Actor	Ramanujan	Nominated	
