= South Indian Hero =

- Directed by: Naresh Kumar HN
- Written by: Naresh Kumar HN, Shreedhar Thot
- Produced by: Shilpa LS
- Starring: Sarthak, Kaashima Rafi, Vijay Chendoor, Urvashi Roy, Yogaraj Bhat, Ashwin Palakki, Amith
- Cinematography: Rajasekhar
- Music by: Harsha Vardhan Raj and Anil CJ
- Production company: Riyanshi Films
- Release date: 24 February 2023
- Running time: 155 minutes
- Country: India
- Language: Kannada

South Indian Hero is a 2023 Kannada language romantic and action drama written and directed by Naresh Kumar HN and Co written by Shreedhar Thot. It stars Sarthak, Kaashima Rafi, Urvashi Roy, Yogaraj Bhat, Vijay Chendoor, Ashwin Palakki and Amith in the lead roles.

The music is composed by Harsha Vardhan Raj and Anil CJ. Rajasekhar is the cinematographer.

The film is produced by Shilpa LS. And it was released on 24 February 2023.

== Plot ==
The voyage begins with his logic-driven existence as a physics professor in his town, but also in genuine love with a lady from his college, and depicts the typical cycle of small-town dreams and lifestyle.When circumstances force this person to relocate to a big city and work in the film industry of lights and glitter, his logic-driven inquisitiveness about the numerous possibilities in this new trip results in light-hearted yet thought-provoking behaviours and emotions. With big time success unexpectedly tempting our hero in filmdom, he is now in the midst of all the larger than life lifestyle of a superstar, despite the fact that he merely seeks the basic and real things in life that he enjoyed in his hometown. The crux is how this fame and glitter strangles his innocent mind and lifestyle, causing him to lose his love, family, and loved ones, and his effort to get them back into his life.

== Cast ==
- Sarthak as Logic Laxman Rao (Lucky)
- Kaashima Rafi as Manasi
- Vijay Chendoor as Director
- Urvashi Roy as Spoorthy
- Yogaraj Bhat
- Nagaraj Bhat
- Chitkala Biradar
- Gurudev Goud

== Reception ==
According to The Times of India the critic's rating is 3.5 while average users rating is 3.8 out of 5.
