= Gulf (film) =

- Release poster
- Directed by: P. Sunil Kumar Reddy
- Produced by: Yekkali Ravindra Babu; Ramani Kumar
- Starring: Chetan Maddineni; Dimple Hayathi
- Music by: Praveen Immadi
- Production company: Sravya Films
- Release date: 13 October 2017
- Country: India
- Language: Telugu

Gulf is a 2017 Indian Telugu-language film directed by P. Sunil Kumar Reddy and starring Chetan Maddineni and newcomer Dimple Hayathi. The film is about Indians who move to the Middle East in search of jobs. The film depicts several real incidents.

== Cast ==
- Chetan Maddineni as Shiva
- Dimple Hayathi as Lakshmi
- Bhadram as Bangarraju
- Mippu as Naveen
- Subramani as Subramani
- Venu Yeldandi as Somulu
- Nagineedu as Rajaiah
- Jeeva as Balaraju
- Posani Krishna Murali as Manga Reddy
- Tanikella Bharani as Sufi Song Singer
- Sana as Karunakka
- Prabhas Sreenu as Chandram
- Thotapalli Madhu
- Bithiri Sathi

== Production ==
The director collected experiences of Indian working in the Middle East through email. The film (which was initially planned as a multilingual) is based on the struggles of Indians in the Middle East and stars Chetan as a weaver's son. The film was mostly shot in Dubai and Ras-Al-Khaima.

== Music ==
The music for the film was composed by Praveen Immadi.

Track listing
No.	Title	Lyrics	Singer(s)	Length
1.	"Edure Paduthunte"	Sirasri	Geetha Madhuri, Deepu	3:25
2.	"Nenellipotha Dubai Ki"	Suni, Pravin	Lipsika, Dhanunjay	3:37
3.	"Aashala Rekkalu Kattukoni"	Kasarla Shyam	Anjana Sowmya	4:18
4.	"Sufi Song"	Master Jee	K. M. Radha Krishnan, Hymath, Mohana Bhogaraju	4:05
5.	"Arabic Song"	Ahmed U. A. E.	Ahmed U. A. E.	2:06
Total length:				17:31

== Release ==
Neeshita Nyayapati of The Times of India gave the film a rating of 2.2 out of 5 stars and wrote that "He [The director] manages to touch upon sensitive topics like physical and sexual abuse of the Indian workers in the Gulf, and does an effective job of it". A critic from 123Telugu gave the film a rating of 2.5 out of 5 and said that "On the whole, Gulf is a very realistic film about the problems that Indians face in the Gulf countries".
