= Shriya Sharma =

Indian actress and model (born 1997)

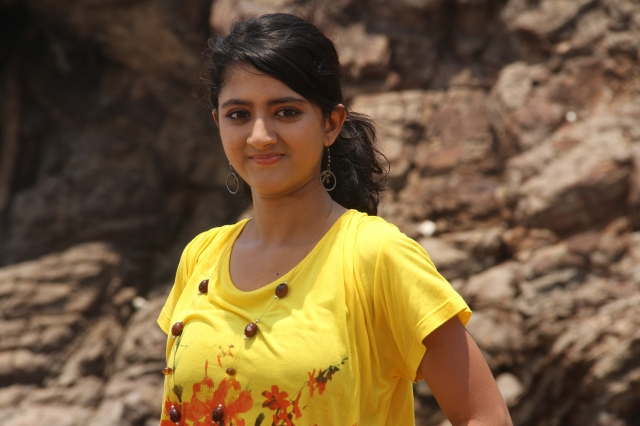
- Born: Shriya Sharma; 1997 (age 28–29); Palampur, Himachal Pradesh India
- Occupations: Actress, model, advocate
- Years active: 2001–2016
- Awards: National Film Award for Best Child Artist

Shriya Sharma (born 1997) is an Indian actress, model and advocate who has worked in Hindi, Tamil and Telugu films. She is known for playing the younger version of Sneha Basu in the television series Kasautii Zindagi Kay which won her the Star Pariwar and Indian Telly Awards for Best Child Artist. She was awarded the National Film Award for the Best Child Artist for Chillar Party (2011).

== Personal life ==
Shriya Sharma was born in 1997, in the city of Palampur, Himachal Pradesh in India. Her father is an engineer and her mother is a dietician and runs a diet clinic - Ritus Diet. She is a graduate in law and is currently practicing as an advocate. She has a younger brother.

== Filmography ==
=== Films ===
Child Actress
Year	Title	Role	Language	Notes	Refs
2005	Jai Chiranjeeva	Lavanya	Telugu	Debut as Child artist	
2006	Sillunu Oru Kaadhal	Aishwarya 'Aishu' Gautham	Tamil	Tamil Debut as Child Artist	
2007	Soundarya	Varsha	Kannada	Kannada Debut as Child artist	
2007	Laaga Chunari Mein Daag	Unknown	Hindi	Hindi debut as Child artist	
2008	Thoda Pyaar Thoda Magic	Aditi Walia	Hindi		
2010	Prem Kaa Game	Pinky	Hindi		
2010	Enthiran	Curious student	Tamil	Cameo appearance	
2010	Knock Out	Sweety	Hindi		
2011	Chillar Party	Toothpaste	Hindi	National Film Award for the Best Child Artist.	
2011	Dookudu	Sushanti	Telugu		
2012	Racha	Chaitra's sister	Telugu		
2012	Tuneega Tuneega	Young Nidhi	Telugu		
2012	Neethane En Ponvasantham	Kavya	Tamil	Bilingual film	
2012	Yeto Vellipoyindhi Manasu	Kavya	Telugu	Bilingual film	
2024	Naam	Muskaan, Pooja's daughter	Hindi	Delayed release, Filmed in 2004	

Lead Actress
Year	Title	Role	Language	Notes	Refs
2015	Gayakudu	Akshara	Telugu	Debut as lead actress in Telugu	
2015	Billu Gamer	Ruby	Hindi	Debut as lead actress in Hindi	
2016	Nirmala Convent	Shanti	Telugu		

=== Television ===
- Kanhaiya
- Kasautii Zindagii Kay as Sneha Bajaj (2004-2005)
- Jhoot Bole Kawya Katte as Shriya
- Carryy on Shekhar
- Galaxy of Stars
- Gumrah: End of Innocence (Season 3 - Episode 3)
- Confessions of an Indian Teenager
- Pogo Awards (2006 and 2007)
- Kya Aap Paanchvi Pass Se Tez Hain? as herself with Shah Rukh Khan (2008)
- Boogie Woogie as Jury member (2008)
- LIL STAR Awards (2008)
- Stories by Rabindranath Tagore as Ameena (Episode 26 - Dalia) (2015)

== Other works ==
Shriya has reportedly done over 150 advertisements in Hindi, English, Tamil, Malayalam, Telugu, Kanada and Bengali languages for brands like - Complan, Asian Paints, Red Label Tea, Pears Soap, Santoor Soap, Colgate, RmKV, Chennai Silks, Pothys, Sarvana Stores, Sunfeast Pasta Treat, Lux Cozi, Whirlpool among others. She has also featured in Punjabi music videos and has done dance stage performances for ETV in 2017.

== Awards ==
- Indian Telly Award for Best Child Artiste - Female for Kasautii Zindagii Kay.
- National Film Award for the Best Child Artist for Chillar Party.
