= Gayakudu =

- Film poster
- Directed by: Kamal G
- Screenplay by: Kamal G
- Produced by: Jammalamadu Ravindranath
- Starring: Ali Reza; Shriya Sharma; M. S. Narayana; Saptagiri
- Cinematography: Kolli Durga Prasad
- Edited by: S. B. Uddhav
- Music by: Roshan Salur
- Production company: Dheeru Films
- Release date: 20 February 2015
- Running time: 178 minutes
- Country: India
- Language: Telugu

Gayakudu is a 2015 Indian Telugu language romantic drama film directed by Kamal G and produced by Jammalamadu Ravindranath. The film stars Ali Reza and Shriya Sharma. The film's music was composed by Roshan Salur and the film was released on 20 February 2015.

== Cast ==
- Ali Reza as Siddansh
- Shriya Sharma as Akshara
- M. S. Narayana
- Saptagiri
- Guru Charan

== Soundtrack ==
The film's music score and soundtrack album was composed by Roshan Salur.

== Reception ==
A writer from 123telugu rated the film 2.25/5 and wrote that

Plus Points, Even though this is their debut as the main leads, both Siddansh (Ali Reza) and Akshara (Shriya Sharma) performed really well. Siddhans showed maturity in the singer’s role. He needs to tune his expressions in emotional scenes. Akshara, impresses with topnotch performance in almost every scene. Her experience as a child actress helped her throughout. However, the teen actress still looks quite young. The film’s music composed by Roshan Saluri is a great asset to the film. All his songs are trendy and have been shot well. The director shows his spark in cleverly using the songs in the narrative.
