= Beach Road Chetan =

Indian Telugu-language action thriller film

- Theatrical release poster
- Directed by: Chetan Maddineni
- Written by: Chetan Maddineni
- Produced by: Chetan Maddineni
- Starring: Chetan Maddineni; Teja Reddy
- Cinematography: Nishant Reddy
- Edited by: M.R. Varma
- Music by: Samuel J. Benaiah
- Production company: Chetan Maddineni Productions
- Release date: 22 November 2019
- Country: India
- Language: Telugu

Beach Road Chetan is a 2019 Indian Telugu-language action thriller film directed, produced, and written by Chetan Maddineni who also stars in the lead alongside Teja Reddy.

The film was released on 22 November 2019 to mixed reviews although the film was noted for its free premiere show.

== Cast ==
- Chetan Maddineni as Chetan
- Teja Reddy as Shruthi
- Razia Abdul
- Veeresh Babu
- Ravi Nag
- Mohan
- Rupesh

== Production ==
Actor Chetan Maddineni decided to take up direction after being dissatisfied with his previous works. The film featured 150 new actors with the crew members taking on negative roles. Mohan and Rupesh, short film makers from Visakhapatnam (Vizag), made their feature film debut through this film. The film was entirely shot on an iPhone 7 predominately in Vizag with some portions shot in Hyderabad. The locations in Vizag included Beach Road, Siripuram and Jagadamba. The film was named Beach Road Chetan after the film's main character with Beach Road signifying his youth and also being a significant shooting spot for the film.

Beach Road Chetan was given an A certificate.

== Music ==
The film has music composed by Samuel J. Benaiah.

All lyrics are written by Bhatluru Rajaratnam.

Track listing
No.	Title	Singer(s)	Length
1.	"Degree Mukhyam Kaadhura"	Simha	3:37
2.	"Swachaga"	Lipsika, Deepu	3:20
3.	"Pedave Pilichene"	Hemachandra	3:35
4.	"Kokkorokko"	Geetha Madhuri	3:16
Total length:			13:48

== Release ==
The film was released on 22 November 2019 in Andhra Pradesh and Telangana in 200 theatres with the first morning show on release day being free for everyone. The film is available to stream on Amazon Prime Video since 2020.
