= Maate Mantramu =

Telugu television series

- Genre: Soap opera
- Written by: Govardhan Reddy &Anjan Megoti
- Directed by: Vara Mullapudi
- Starring: Ali Reza / Karthik; Pallavi
- Original language: Telugu
- No. of episodes: 585

Production
- Producer: SS.Reddy Vallabhapuram
- Camera setup: Multi-camera
- Running time: 20–22 minutes
- Production company: Zee Entertainment Enterprises

Original release
- Network: Zee Telugu
- Release: 7 May 2018 – 21 August 2020

Maate Mantramu is an Indian Telugu language romantic drama television series which aired on Zee Telugu from 7 May 2018. It stars Ali Reza and Pallavi Ramisetty.

== Cast ==
- Ali Reza / Karthik as Vamsi Krishna
- Pallavi Ramisetty as Vasundara
- Siva Parvathy as Grandma
- Karati Kalyani
- Ravikiran as Murali

== Adaptations ==
Language	Title	Original release	Network(s)	Last aired	Notes
Kannada	Radha Kalyana ರಾಧಾ ಕಲ್ಯಾಣ	15 July 2019	Zee Kannada	3 April 2020	Remake
Tamil	Gokulathil Seethai கோகுலத்தில் சீதை	4 November 2019	Zee Tamil	14 May 2022	Remake
Marathi	Gotham Gikati गोथम चिकाटी	TBA	Zee Marathi	Upcoming	Remake
