= Krishna Rama =

2023 Indian Telugu-language film by Raj Madiraju

- Release poster
- Directed by: Raj Madiraju
- Written by: Raj Madiraju
- Produced by: Venkata Kiran Kumar Kallakuri; Hema Madhuri Kallakuri
- Starring: Rajendra Prasad; Gautami; Ananya Sharma Ongram
- Cinematography: Ranganath Gogineni
- Edited by: Junaid Siddique
- Music by: Sunil Kashyap
- Production company: Adwitiya Movies
- Distributed by: ETV Win
- Release date: 22 October 2023
- Running time: 119 minutes
- Country: India
- Language: Telugu

Krishna Rama (stylized as #Krishna Rama) is a 2023 Indian Telugu-language drama film written and directed by Raj Madiraju. The film features Rajendra Prasad, Gautami and Ananya Sharma Ongram in important roles.

The film was released on 22 October 2023 on ETV Win.

== Cast ==
- Rajendra Prasad as Ramathirtham
- Gautami as Krishnaveni
- Ananya Sharma Ongram as Preethi
- Srikanth Iyengar
- Ravi Varma
- Gemini Suresh
- Racha Ravi
- Sri Sudha Bhimireddy
- Charan Lakkaraju

== Release and reception ==
Krishna Rama was released on 22 October 2023 on ETV Win.

Srivathsan Nadadhur of OTTPlay gave a rating of 3 out of 5 and wrote that "Rajendra Prasad and Gautami steer the ship with their experience in the hands of a clear-headed filmmaker".
