= Raj Madiraju =

Indian film director and screenwriter

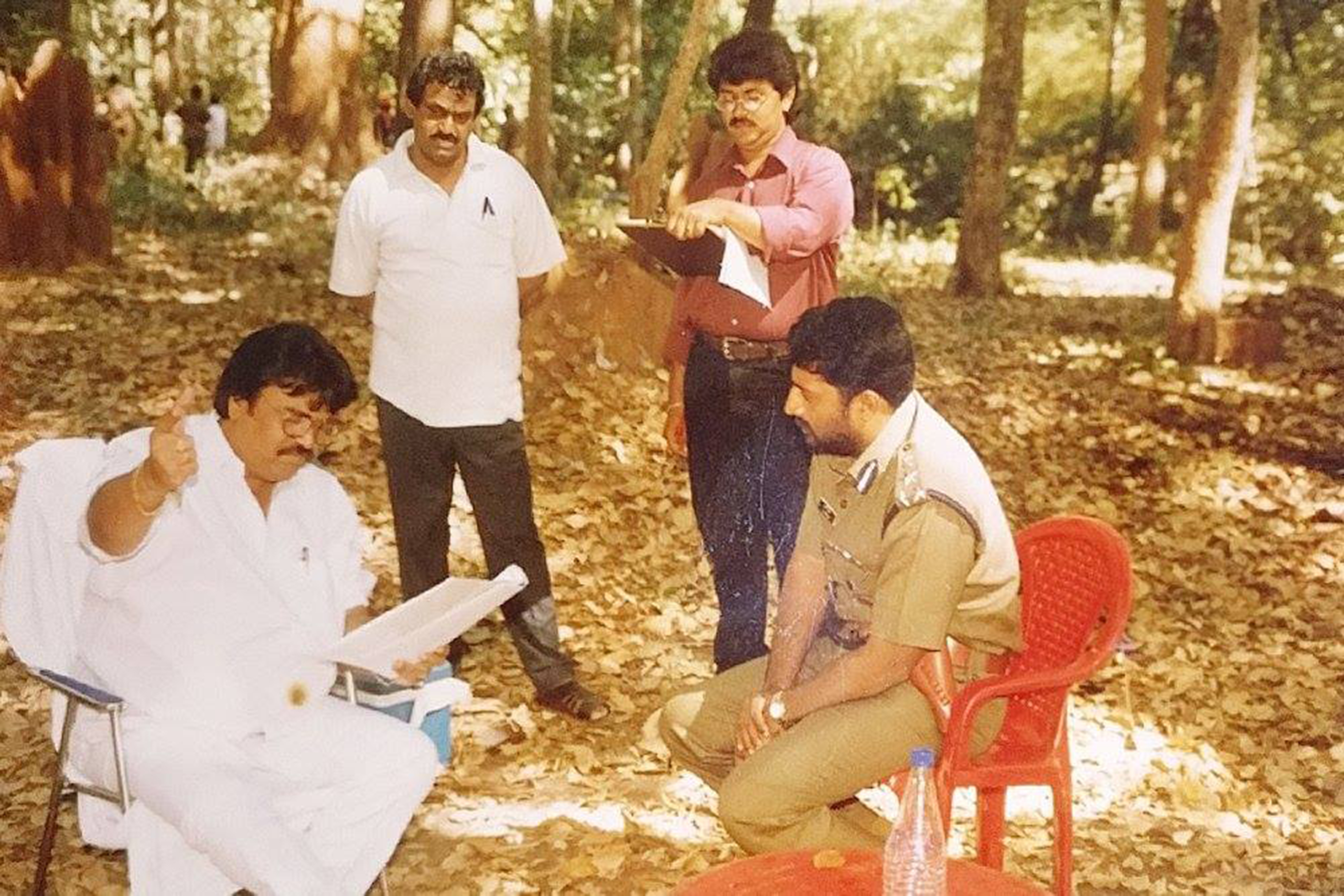
- Raj Madiraju assisting Dasari Narayana Rao for Sammakka Sarakka in 1997
- Born: Raja Sekhar Madiraju; 5 December 1969 (age 56); Paloncha, Khammam, Telangana, India
- Occupations: Director, screenwriter, actor, and producer
- Years active: 1996–present
- Spouse: Mythily
- Children: 1

Raj Madiraju is an Indian film director, screenwriter, actor and producer. In a career spanning about 20 years, he predominantly worked in Telugu cinema. In 2011 and 2012, he wrote and directed Rushi, for which he won the Nandi Award for Best Story Writer.

== Early life and education ==
He joined Avanthi School of Business Management, affiliated to Osmania University, in 1995 to pursue a master's degree in business administration.

== Career ==
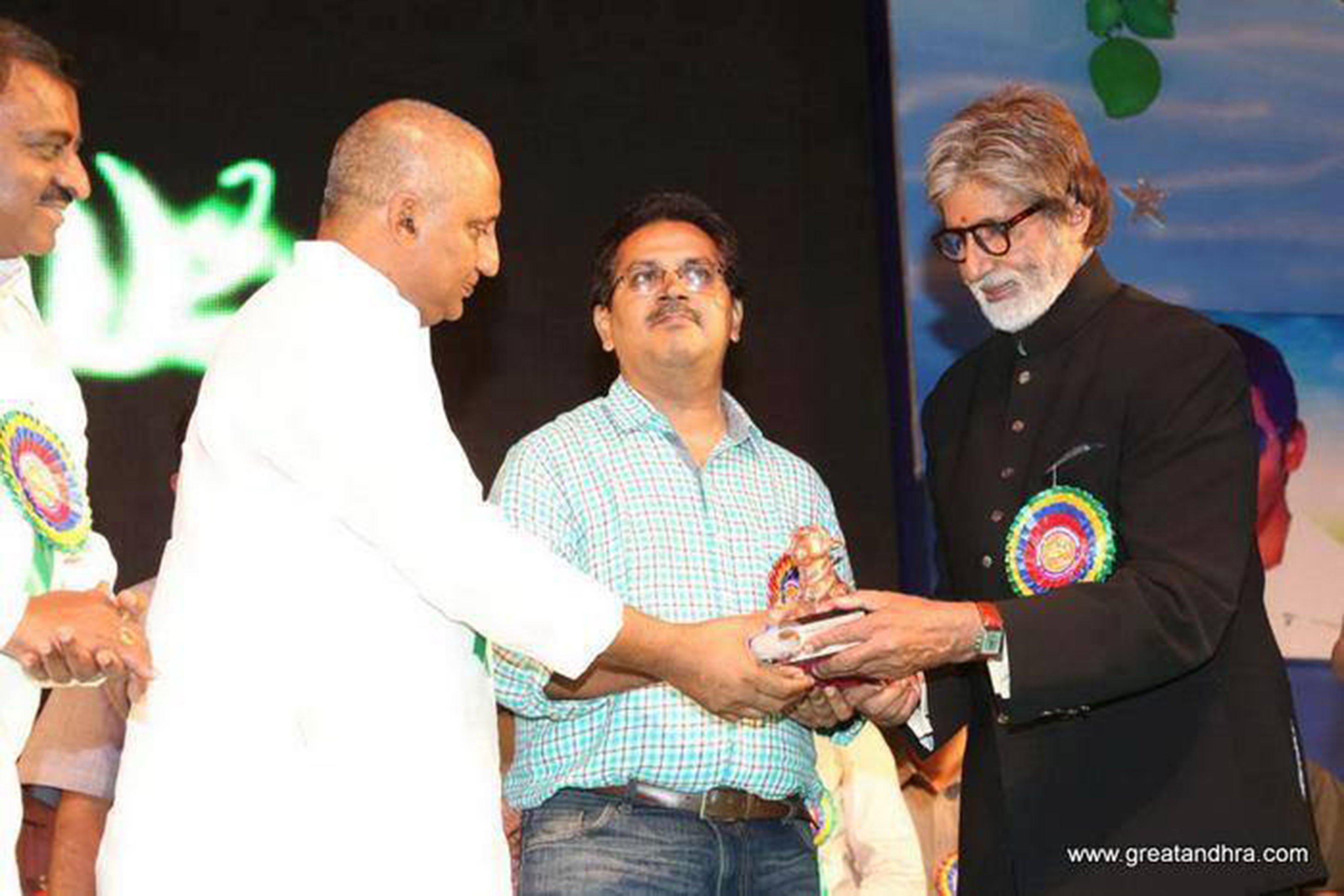
Raj Madiraju receiving State Nandi Award for Rushi in 2012

He worked with Dasari Narayana Rao for Osey Ramulamma. He then joined Chiranjeevi's unfinished Hollywood venture Return of Abu – Thief of Bagdad in 1999 as assistant director to Suresh Krissna. He also worked on ad commercials and corporate films.

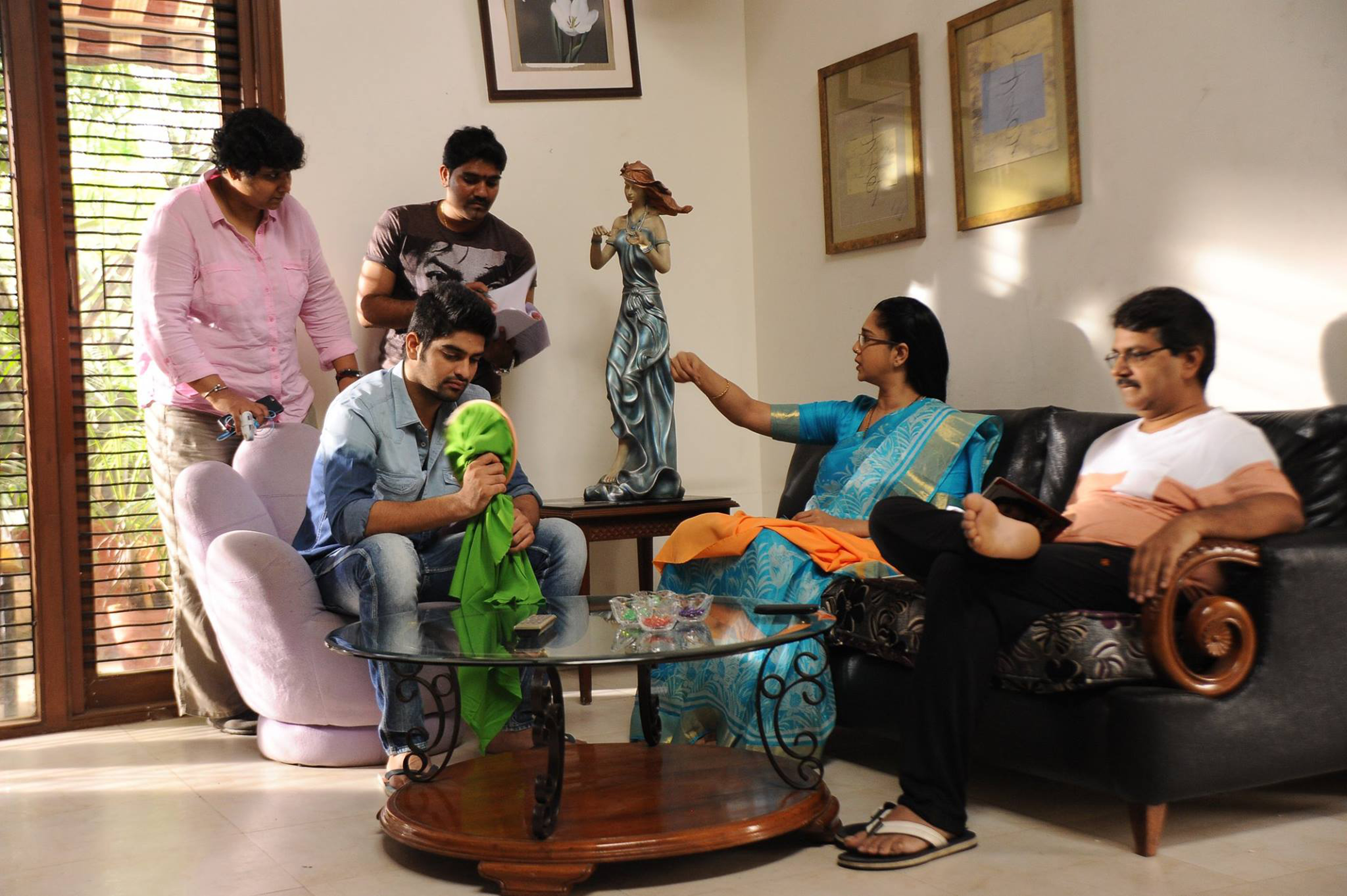
A working still from Kalyana Vaibhogame featuring Raj Madiraju and director Nandini Reddy

Madiraju made his directorial debut in 2000 with the Tarun starrer Uncle produced by comedian AVS. The film was a box office failure.

Madiraju's next film was the techno thriller Aithe 2.0, in 2016. The film was officially selected for screening at LA Cinefest, Barcelona Planet Film Festival and Calcutta International Cult Film Festival. While it booked a semi-final berth in LA Cinefest, it won the outstanding achievement award at CICFF.

=== Montages Cinema ===
His Montages Cinema is in the process of developing story ideas to scripts while also making inroads into the idea of building a talent bank.

== Personal life ==
Raj Madiraju married Mythily in 1997 and they have one daughter.

== Filmography ==
=== As film director ===
Year	Title	Notes
2000	Uncle	credited as Rajasekhar
2012	Rushi	Nandi Award for Best Story Writer
2015	Andhra Pori	Remake of Timepass
2018	Aithe 2.0	
2023	Grey: The Spy Who Loved Me	
2023	Krishna Rama	

=== As an actor ===
Year	Title	Role	Notes
1996	Kalyana Praptirastu		
1997	Osey Ramulamma		
2000	Uncle		
2015	Andhra Pori		
2016	Kalyana Vaibhogame		
2016	Appatlo Okadundevadu	IPS officer	
2016	Majnu	Aditya's father	
2017	Raja Meeru Keka	Maha's father	
2017	Vunnadhi Okate Zindagi	Bhargavi's father	
2017	Jawan	Swetcha's father	
2017	Mental Madhilo		
2018	Aithe 2.0		
2019	Brochevarevarura	Film producer	
2020	Pressure Cooker	Anitha's father	
2020	Krishna and His Leela	Radha's father	
2020	Atma Rama Ananda Ramana		
2023	Grey: The Spy Who Loved Me	RAW agent	
2023	Prem Kumar	Netra's father	
2023	Krishna Rama		
