= The Trial (2023 film) =

Telugu-language thriller film

- Theatrical release poster
- Directed by: Raam Ganni
- Written by: Raam Ganni
- Produced by: Smriti Sagi; Srinivas K Naidu
- Starring: Spandana Palli; Yug Ram; Vamsi Kotu
- Cinematography: Shrie Saikumaar Daara
- Edited by: Srikanth Patnaik
- Music by: Saravana Vasudevan
- Release date: 24 November 2023
- Country: India
- Language: Telugu

The Trial is a 2023 Indian Telugu-language feature film. It is directed and written by Raam Ganni and produced by Smriti Sagi and Srinivas K Naidu. Spandana Palli, Yug Ram and Vamsi Kotu are in lead roles.

The film was theatrically released on 24 November 2023.

== Premise ==
Police Sub-inspector Rajeev is entrusted with the task of interrogating a woman, Rupa, under suspicion of her husband Ajay's accidental death. After learning that Rupa is also a Sub-Inspector, Rajeev delves deeper into the case and uncovers some surprising facts.

== Cast ==
- Spandana Palli as Sub-Inspector Roopa
- Yug Ram as Ajay, Roopa's husband
- Vamsi Kotu as Circle Inspector Rajeev
- Udhay Pulime
- Sakhi Uttada
- Jashwanth Perumalla
- Vazeer Ishaan

== Reception ==
Avad Mohammad of OTTPlay gave the film 3/5 stars and wrote, "The Trial is an honest attempt by a young team. Director Raam Ganni impresses with his crisp narration and interesting thrills. Though the film lacks a strong motive, the thrills and crisp runtime make for a decent watch this weekend."
