= Vilambaram (2019 film) =

2019 Indian film by Suriyanithi

- Directed by: K. A. Suriyanithi
- Written by: K. A. Suriyanithi
- Produced by: A. Joseph Stalin
- Starring: Abhinay Vaddi; Haira; Aishwarya Rajesh
- Cinematography: Abdulkalam
- Edited by: P. Sai Suresh
- Music by: J. Vimal
- Production company: Prince Film Circuit
- Release date: 1 March 2019
- Running time: 134 minutes
- Country: India
- Language: Tamil

Vilambaram (transl. Publicity) is a 2019 Indian Tamil-language film directed by Suriyanithi and produced by Joseph Stalin. It stars Abhinay Vaddi, Haira and Aishwarya Rajesh. Featuring music composed by J. Vimal, the film began production in mid-2012 was released in March 2019.

== Cast ==
- Abhinay Vaddi as Ashvin / Santhosh
- Haira as Sharanya
- Aishwarya Rajesh as Aishwarya
- Thambi Ramaiah as Gem Ad Agency owner
- Rithish
- Suman Shetty
- Scissor Manohar
- Benjamin
- N. S. Pazhani
- Ganesh Kannaiah
- Rekha
- Padmini
- Elizabeth
- Susik
- Yatrasri
- Augustine
- Bhuvana
- Sona Heiden as an item number "Yennai Yenda"

== Production ==
The film's producer Joseph Stalin, an entrepreneur, met director Suriyanithi through the co-producer of the film, V. P. Ramakrishnan, and agreed to finance his debut film. Suriyanithi had previously apprenticed under directors including K. Balachander, Yaar Kannan and Sundar K. Vijayan. The makers decided to cast actor Abhinay Vaddi after seeing him in Dasari Narayana Rao's Young India (2010), and Vilambaram was the first Tamil film that he signed on to appear in. The film was shot throughout late 2012 and early 2013 in Kuala Lumpur and Putrajaya, with actresses Haira and Aishwarya Rajesh also joining the cast. Rajesh played a glamorous character in the film.

Following Aishwarya Rajesh's appearances in Rummy (2014) and Pannaiyarum Padminiyum (2014), she had become a known presence in the Tamil film industry. The producers subsequently increased her visibility in the film's promotional material and tried to pass her off as the film's lead actress in July 2014. Aishwarya later spoke out against the makers, suggesting that she had only appeared in a small role in the film and that the promoters were misrepresenting her involvement in the project. The film continued to be delayed and unreleased for five further years, before being released in 2019.

== Soundtrack ==
The soundtrack is composed by J. Vimal Raj. He previously worked on the score for the film Senthoora Poove and the director of this film, Suriyanithi, worked as an assistant director for the film.

- "Azhagazhagai" - Harish Raghavendra
- "Chevvaai Malarntha" - Shravya
- "Yennai Yenda" - Priya Himesh, Velmurugan (lyrics by J. Vimal Raj)
- "Vilambaram" - Ranjith
- "Vilambaram" - J. Vimal Raj

== Release ==
The film released on 1 March 2019 along with 90 ML, Dha Dha 87, Thirumanam, and Thadam. The film went unnoticed at the box office.
