= Kalasa - The Symbol of Abundance =

- Theatrical release poster
- Directed by: Konda Rambabu
- Written by: Konda Rambabu
- Produced by: Dr. Rajeswari Chandraja Vadapalli
- Starring: Anurag; Sonakshi Varma
- Cinematography: Venkat Gangadhari
- Edited by: Junaid Siddiqui
- Music by: Vijay Kurakula
- Production company: Velan Productions
- Distributed by: Chandraja Art Creation
- Release date: 15 December 2023
- Country: India
- Language: Telugu

Kalasa - The Symbol of Abundance is a 2023 Indian Telugu -language film written and directed by Konda Rambabu. The film stars Anurag and Sonakshi Varma in the lead roles. The film was produced by Dr. Rajeswari Chandraja Vadapalli under the banner of Chandraja Art Creations.

== Cast ==
- Anurag
- Sonakshi Varma
- Bhanu Sree
- Roshini Kamisetty

== Production ==
The film was produced by Dr. Rajeswari Chandraja Vadapalli under the banner of Chandraja Art Creations. The cinematography was done by Venkat Gangadhari, while editing was handled by Junaid Siddiqui.

== Reception ==
Times Now critic stated that "In conclusion, Kalasa: The Symbol Of Abundance is a cinematic gem that captivates the audience with its emotional depth, stellar performances, and a narrative that transcends the boundaries of conventional storytelling" and rated three star out of five.Sakshi Post wrote " This one is indeed a mind-bending thriller. The performances and the atmospheric set-up are commendable."
