= Chetan Maddineni =

Indian actor

- Born: 29 January; Visakhapatnam, Andhra Pradesh, India
- Occupation: Actor
- Years active: 2016–present

Chetan Krishna Maddineni is an Indian actor who appears in Telugu films. He has debuted with Rojulu Marayi (2016) and got recognition through 1st Rank Raju (2019).

== Early life and career ==
Chetan was born on 29 January in Visakhapatnam, India. He moved to the United States and came back during his third standard. He continued his education and later joined Satyanand Acting Institute in Visakhapatnam.

He was introduced to Maruthi through a family friend. Maruthi was the writer of his debut film Rojulu Marayi. He got recognition through 2019 film 1st Rank Raju. His immediate next Beach Road Chetan was his directorial debut.

== Filmography ==
Year	Title	Role	Notes
2016	Rojulu Marayi	Aswadh	
2017	Gulf	Shiva	
2019	1st Rank Raju	Raju	
2019	Beach Road Chetan	Chetan	Also director and producer
2024	Dhoom Dhaam	Karthik	
