= Grey: The Spy Who Loved Me =

- Release poster
- Directed by: Raj Madiraju
- Written by: Raj Madiraju
- Produced by: Kiran Kallakuri
- Starring: Ali Reza; Arvind Krishna; Urvashi Rai; Pratap Pothen; Raj Madiraju
- Cinematography: Chetan Madhuranthak
- Edited by: Satya Giduthuri
- Music by: Nagaraju Talluri
- Production company: Adwitiya Movies Private Limited
- Release date: 26 May 2023
- Running time: 121 minutes
- Country: India
- Language: Telugu

Grey: The Spy Who Loved Me is a 2023 Indian Telugu-language spy thriller film directed by Raj Madiraju. The movie was released theatrically worldwide on 26 May 2023. The film stars Ali Reza, Arvind Krishna, Urvashi Rai, Prathap Pothen and Raj Madiraju.

== Plot ==
Officer Nayak investigates the death of Professor Sudarshan Reddy and meets Arushi Reddy, the professor's wife. Nayak discovers that Dr. Raghu, the professor's psychiatrist, is also involved in the murder. The drama opens up the gray shadows of intelligence agencies, their procedures, betrays, scandals, and cover-ups.

== Cast ==
- Ali Reza as Inspector Nayak
- Arvind Krishna as Dr. Raghu
- Urvashi Rai as Aarushi Reddy/Sharma
- Pratap Pothen as ISRO scientist Sudarshan Reddy
- Raj Madiraju as RAW agent
- Siddharth Gollapudi as Vishwanath

== Reception ==
A critic from Hindustan Times rated the film 2 1/2 out of 5 and wrote that "The variation on Gray's name is not seen in the film. The director tries to please the audience with glamour and romantic scenes rather than the story". A critic from Sakshi Post wrote that "'Grey' is a watchable thriller with a dose of romance and eroticism. And yes, there is suspense as well". A critic from The Hans India wrote that "While movie lovers felt that they are in for a different thrilling treat and that too in grey shades watching ‘Grey’ in black and white, they are proven wrong. The entire espionage, honey trap, and other spy thriller backdrop go for a toss and for most of the first half, the director concentrated only on exploiting the glamor and beauty of Urvashi Rai". A critic from News18 wrote that "With its fearless dialogue, captivating musical score, stunning visuals, and outstanding acting, Grey offers an irresistible blend that will leave viewers yearning for additional thrills".
