= Naresh Kumar HN =

Indian film director and a screenwriter

- Occupation: Director
- Years active: 2015—present

Naresh Kumar HN is an Indian film director who works in Kannada-language films. He is known for 1st Rank Raju (2015) and Raju Kannada Medium (2018).

== Early life ==
Naresh Kumar HN was born in 1987 at rural Bangalore, Dodaballapura Taluk to Narshima Murthy and Roopakala. Naresh graduated with a degree in engineering from PESIT in 2008. He obtained a Diploma in Film Direction at KANFIDA (Karnataka Film Director Association).

== Career ==
Naresh worked as an assistant director to Master Anand, Ramesh Aravind and Madhu Chandru. In 2015, Naresh directed his debut film 1st Rank Raju starring Gurunandan. The movie was screened for 100 days and was well received by the audience. In the year 2018 he directed his second movie Raju Kannada Medium which saw Kannada movie star Kicha Sudeep be a part of it along with Gurunandan and Avantika Shetty which was screened for 75 days. Following the success of his movies, He is replicating the First Rank Raju story in Telugu for the audience of tollywood as 1st Rank Raju. He has also made appearances in the famous Kannada version of the Bigg Boss hosted by Kicha Sudeep. In 2023 he opened a production house Riyanshi Films and made his next movie South Indian Hero under his banner.

== Filmography ==
| Year | Film | Note | Ref. |
|---|---|---|---|
| 2015 | 1st Rank Raju | | |
| 2018 | Raju Kannada Medium | | |
| 2019 | 1st Rank Raju | Telugu Film | |
| 2023 | South Indian Hero | | |

== Awards and nominations ==
1. Won the Best Dialogue writer for 1st Rank Raju at the Times Of India - KAFTA Awards.
2. Nominated for BIFFES film festival for Raju Kannada Medium.
