= Hello Meera =

2023 film by Srinivasu Kakarla

- Movie poster
- Directed by: Srinivasu Kakarla
- Written by: Srinivasu Kakarla
- Produced by: Padma Kakarla
- Starring: Gargeyi Yellapragada
- Cinematography: Koppineedi Prashanth
- Edited by: Medikonda Rambabu
- Music by: S.Chinna
- Production company: Lumiere Cinema
- Distributed by: PVR Inox Pictures
- Release date: 21 April 2023
- Running time: 93 minutes
- Country: India
- Languages: Telugu, Tamil

Hello Meera is a 2023 Indian Telugu-language Psychological Family-drama film written and directed by Srinivasu Kakarla. It stars Gargeyi Yellapragada. The film score was composed by S Chinna, the cinematography was by Koppineedi Prashanth, and the editing was by Medikonda Rambabu.

It received a 'U' certificate from the CBFC and was released in cinemas on 21 April 2023.

== Plot ==
An IT worker from Hyderabad named Meera Travels back to her native place Vijayawada to get married. She goes outside to continue getting ready because she eagerly anticipates the big day. Her world is turned upside down by an Instagram tag from her ex-boyfriend Sudhir and call from the Police, which send her on a mental and emotional roller-coaster.

== Cast ==
- Gargeyi Yellapragada as Meera

== Soundtrack ==
Hello Meera

Soundtrack album by S.Chinna
- Released: 2023
- Recorded: 2022–2023
- Genre: Feature film soundtrack
- Language: Telugu
- Label: Aditya Music
- Producer: S.Chinna

All music is composed by S.Chinna.

Tracklist
No.	Title	Lyrics	Singer(s)	Length
1.	"Naa Kanulalo Naa Kalalalo"	Sri Sai Kiran	Sameera Baradwaj	3:20
2.	"Haiga Unnanallu Andaru Inolle"	Sri Sai Kiran	Deepak Blue	2:14
