= Currency Nagar =

- Theatrical release poster
- Directed by: Vennela Kumar Pothepalli
- Written by: Vennela Kumar Pothepalli
- Produced by: Mukkamula Apparao; Koduru Gopala Krishna
- Starring: Mahesh Yadlapalli; Spandana Sommanna; Sudharshan; Rajshekar Aningi
- Cinematography: Sathish Rajaboyina
- Music by: Sidharth Sadasivuni and Pavan
- Production company: Unnati Arts
- Release date: 29 December 2023
- Country: India
- Language: Telugu

Currency Nagar is a 2023 Telugu anthology thriller film that delves into the complexities of human desires and the entwined nature of individuals with money. The film is produced by Mukkamala Apparao and Koduru Gopala Krishna under the Unnati Arts banner, with direction by Vennela Kumar Pothepalli. It features an ensemble cast including Mahesh Yadlapalli, Spandana Somana, Keshava, Gautam Kumar, Rajasekhar, Chandini, and Sudharshan in pivotal roles.

== Cast ==
- Mahesh Yadlapalli as Surya, a protagonist with supernatural powers, particularly the ability to experience precognitive dreams.
- Spandhana Somanna as Geetha, a character grappling with insomnia.
- Keshava takes on the lead role in the second story.
- Rajasekhar plays the antagonist in the first story.
- Sudharshan portrays a mischievous thief.

== Production ==
Currency Nagar began with a crowdfunding initiative. Set around the theme of money, eight short stories were selected, with four forming the foundation of the film.

The film, shot against the backdrop of Vijayawada, featured three separate schedules in Penumaka, Vijayawada, Krishna Lanka, and Nuziveedu, involving a cast of 48 artists.

== Soundtrack ==
All lyrics are written by Pawan Kumar.

Track-List
No.	Title	Artist(s)	Length
1.	"Hey Kalala Vunde"	Raazi	02:32
Total length:			02:32

== Release and reception ==
The film was theatrically released on 29 December 2023.
