= Ali Reza (actor) =

Indian actor

- Born: 24 May 1985 (age 41); Hyderabad, Andhra Pradesh, India
- Occupation: Actor
- Years active: 2008–present
- Spouse: Masuma Beiki (m. 2018)

Ali Reza Kheradmand (born 24 May 1985) know professionally as Ali Reza, is an Indian model and actor who works in Telugu cinema. He made his debut as lead role in Gayakudu (2015), followed by Cine Mahal (2017) and Naa Rautee Separate (2017). In 2019 he participated in the reality television show Bigg Boss 3.

== Early life ==
Reza completed his education from St John's Church High School and St John's College. He is the only son to his parents and worked in Dubai for couple of years before coming into entertainment industry. Reza also owns the restaurant Ramser at Marredpally, Secunderabad which was started by his ancestors from Iran.

== Career ==
Reza made his film debut in the 2008 Hindi film Mukhbiir and entered the Telugu industry in 2010 through the TV serial Passupu KumKuma associated with Zee Telugu. He then went on to do a character role in Chandamama Lo Amrutham in 2014 and finally got a break as lead in Gayakudu in the same year. The movie went on to do well at box office.

== Personal life ==
Reza married Masuma Beiki, an air hostess, in 2018.

== Filmography ==
Key
†	Denotes films that have not yet been released

- All films are in Telugu unless otherwise noted.

Year	Title	Role	Notes	Ref.
2008	Mukhbiir	Saaya's henchman	Hindi film	
2014	Amrutham Chandamamalo	Sameer		
2015	Gayakudu	Siddansh		
2016	Dhruva	Ranveer IPS		
2017	Cine Mahal	Murli Krishna Prathab "Kittu"		
2017	Naa Routee Separate	Ram		
2019	Hyderabad Nawabs 2	Munna	Hindi film	
2020	Metro Kathalu	Varun		
2021	Wild Dog	Officer Ali Reza		
2023	Ranga Maarthaanda	Siddarth "Siddu"		
2023	CSI Sanatan	Inspector Rudra		
2023	Grey: The Spy Who Loved Me	Officer Nayak		
2023	Bro	Venugopal and Madhanagopal	Dual role	
2023	Mama Mascheendra	Anil		
2024	Masthu Shades Unnai Raa	Rahul		
2024	Ram NRI	Ram		
2025	Jack			
2025	Blind Spot	Aditya		
TBA	Rory †	TBA	Filming	
TBA	Dilwala †	TBA	Announced	

=== Television ===
Year	Title	Role	Network	Language
2010–2014	Pasupu Kunkuma	Arjun	Zee Telugu	Telugu
2017–2018	Evare Nuvvu Mohini	Vasu	Zee Telugu	Telugu
2018–2020	Maate Mantramu	Vamsi Krishna	Zee Telugu	Telugu
2019	Bigg Boss 3	Contestant	Star Maa	Telugu
2020	Expiry Date	Sunny	ZEE5	Hindi; Telugu
2025	Nayanam	Harishchandra		Telugu
