= Arvind Krishna (actor) =

Indian actor (born 1985)

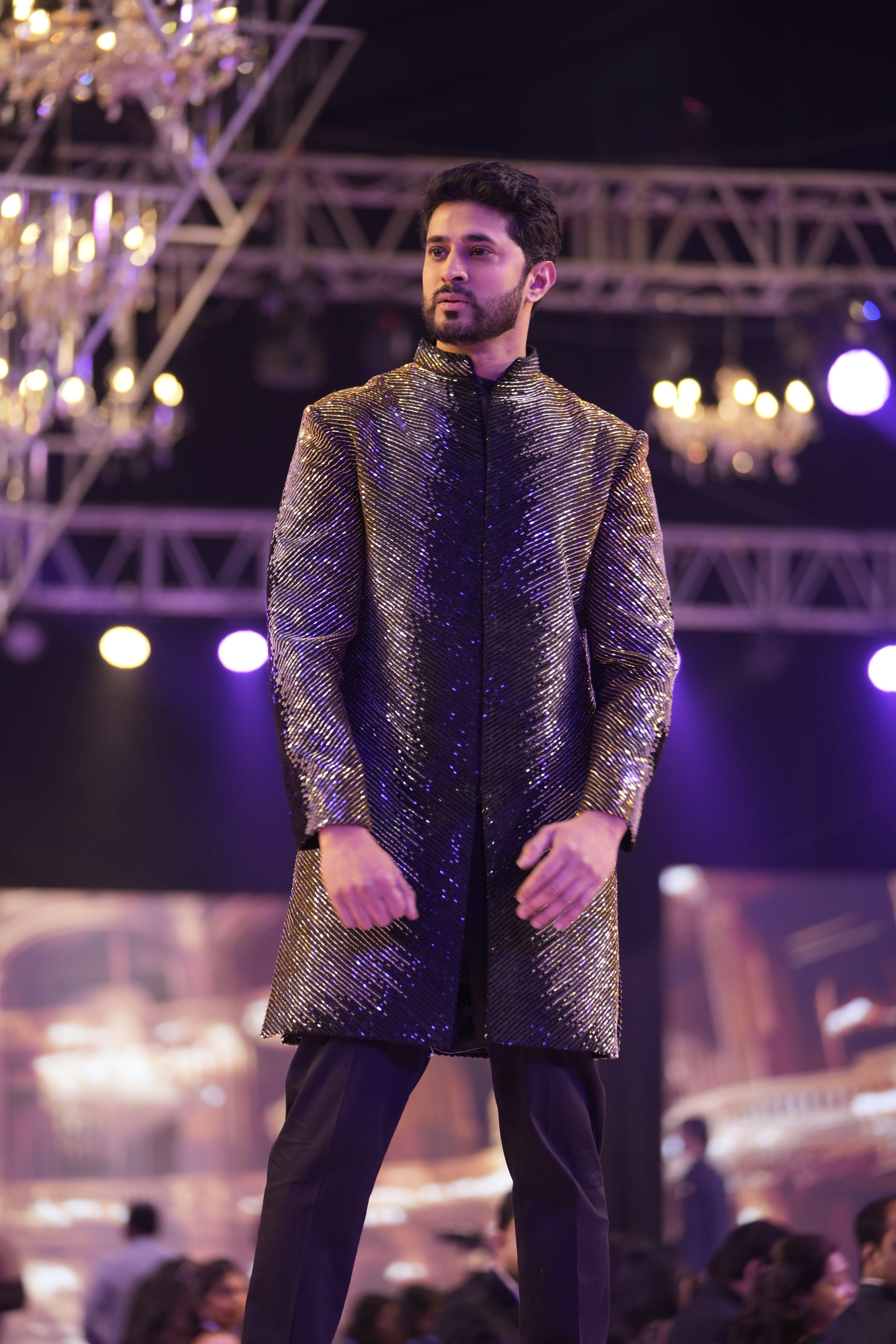
- Born: Chavali Venkata Arvind Krishna Sarma; 5 January 1985 (age 41); Hyderabad, Telangana, India
- Occupations: Actor, basketball player
- Years active: 2010–present
- Height: 6 ft 2 in (188 cm)
- Spouse: Dipika Prasad (m. 2012)

Chavali Venkata Arvind Krishna Sarma (born 5 January 1985), better known by his stage name Arvind Krishna, is an Indian actor who appears in Telugu films.

== Early life and education ==
Arvind Krishna was born to C.V.S.K. Sharma, an IAS officer. He spent his early years in New Delhi before moving to Europe. He pursued his education in the United States from the University of Southern California - MaST (Math and Science Technology) Highly Gifted High School. He then pursued BTech in Biotechnology from JNTU, Hyderabad. Arvind Krishna is a sportsman, played varsity basketball for his high school, Andhra Pradesh and India, and most recently for Telangana.

Upon completing his education, he worked at the Satyam School of Leadership on the Leadership Development team and pursued the Global Business Leadership program with Harvard Business School and U21 Global and Satyam.

== Career ==
Arvind Krishna made his foray into acting with ensemble lead and supporting roles in Young India and Alasyam Amrutham. Both films received poor reviews and failed at the box office. Later, he starred as a main lead in It's My Love Story. His performance in the film earned him a nomination for Best Debut Actor (Male) - Telugu at SIIMA Awards, 2012.

Arvind received a fillip in his career with Rushi. The film won Nandi Award for Best Story, an honour presented at the time by the Andhra Pradesh Government for cinematic excellence, in 2012. He was next seen in Times Internet MX Player's original series Lots of Love, MX Player's flagship product for Telugu.

Arvind is also an Indian professional basketball player and now playing for the team Hyderabad Ballers in 3x3 basketball league (3BL), India.

== Personal life ==
Arvind got engaged to Dipika Prasad, who works in the social enterprise and impact investing space, in August 2012 and got married on 18 November 2012 at Tirumala.

== Filmography ==
Key
†	Denotes films that have not yet been released

- All films are in Telugu, unless otherwise noted.

=== Films ===
Year	Title	Role	Notes
2010	Young India	Razzaq	Debut
2010	Alasyam Amrutham	Sekhar	
2011	It's My Love Story	Arjun	Nominated—SIIMA Award for Best Male Debut – Telugu
2012	Rushi	Dr. Rishi	
2013	Biskett	Ashwin	
2014	Adavi Kaachina Vennela		
2014	Mana Kurralle	Lacchu	
2015	Andhra Pori	Balu	
2016	Eedu Gold Ehe	Sahadev	
2016	Premam	Sanjay	Cameo appearance
2021	Shukra	Willie	
2021	Annaatthe	Meenatchi's husband	Tamil film
2022	Ramarao On Duty	RMP Kabir	
2022	Nathicharami		
2023	Grey: The Spy Who Loved Me	Dr. Raghu	
2024	Honeymoon Express	Rahul	
2024	Fear	Sampath	
TBA	A Masterpiece		Filming

=== Web Series ===
Year	Title	Role	Network	Notes
2019	Lots of Love (LOL)		MX Player	
2020	Bad Boy Billionaires: India	Himself	Netflix	Netflix original documentary
