= Alpha School =

American private school network

- Industry: Education
- Founded: 2014; 12 years ago in Austin, Texas, United States
- Founders: MacKenzie Price, Brian Holtz
- Number of locations: 13 (2026)
- Key people: Joe Liemandt (principal)
- Website: www.alpha.school

Alpha School is a private K–12 school network in the United States founded in 2014. The network uses a proprietary instructional model called 2 Hour Learning, which replaces traditional teachers with "guides" and relies on software-based instruction. Tuition ranges from $10,000 to $75,000 per year. Alpha asserts that students progress more quickly than peers, but these claims rely on internal analyses and have not been independently verified. The school and its affiliated organizations have drawn scrutiny for governance practices involving interconnected for-profit vendors, as well as for their academic claims. Organizations linked to the founders have submitted cyber-charter school applications in several states, most of which have been denied.

== Instructional model ==
Alpha School uses a proprietary instructional model known as 2 Hour Learning, which relies on software-based instruction rather than traditional classroom teaching, which the founders claim covers core academic material in approximately two hours per day. According to MacKenzie Price—one of the two founders, students spend the first two hours of every day on basic school curriculum using app-based AI tutoring, and the rest of the day is spent on life skills, arts, sports, and other projects.

The model replaces traditional teachers with "guides", who provide motivation and supervision while students work independently on software-based lessons. Promotional materials for 2 Hour Learning state that the system allows students to "learn 2X in 2 hours", a claim presented by the company as a core benefit of the model. According to the founders, the "AI" component refers to adaptive learning applications similar to IXL or Khan Academy's tools, rather than large language models. Tuition at most Alpha campuses is reported to be approximately $40,000 per year. In reviewing a related charter application, the Pennsylvania Department of Education described the instructional model as "untested" and lacking evidence of alignment with state academic standards.

Alpha School has stated that its students progress more quickly than peers in traditional schools. These assertions rely on internal analyses of NWEA's Measures of Academic Progress (MAP) assessments, and the underlying data has not been independently reviewed.

Critics note that the school's claims of academic growth have not been independently verified, and they rely on internal metrics from the schools themselves. There is a lack of peer reviewed studies validating the effectiveness of the 2-Hour Learning approach, and no independent research has examined whether reported student outcomes are attributable to the program itself or to other factors.

Alpha School is accredited through Cognia. In late 2025 and early 2026, the Texas comptroller's office temporarily blocked schools which were solely accredited by Cognia from participating in the state's new voucher program, and Alpha School was among those affected. The blockage was subsequently resolved for most of the affected schools, though Cognia-accredited Islamic schools remained excluded as of February 2026.

== Founding and governance ==
Alpha School was founded in 2014 in Austin by MacKenzie Price and Brian Holtz. Joe Liemandt is the principal. It was formerly called Emergent Academy, and began as a spinoff of microschool Acton Academy. The founders have also established other schools using the same instructional model, including GT School, NextGen, Novatio, Unbound, and Valenta.

Concerns have been raised about the governance structure of Alpha School, the related schools, and several for-profit vendor companies hired for core services. The companies are 2 Hour Learning, which supplies the adaptive learning platform; Trilogy Enterprises, which manages financial services; Crossover Markets, which recruits virtual educators; and YYYYY, LLC, which provides general and administrative services. According to Peter Greene, these companies show a close interconnectedness of ownership and management such that non-profit schools contract services from for-profit companies owned or managed by the same individuals. (Note: Quote: "In Pennsylvania, it’s not legal to run a charter school for profit. But the law says nothing about running the school as a non-profit while hiring other for-profit organizations to handle the operation of the school. In Unbound Academy we find the Prices hiring themselves to operate the school.") This has raised concerns about potential self-dealing and conflicts of interest. For example, at Unbound Academy the board members are all affiliated with these vendor companies.

In 2023, the Trilogy CEO used an LLC as a shell to funnel $1 million to Glenn Youngkin's gubernatorial campaign; the LLC, Future of Education LLC, had only been created the day before. The LLC's listed address was the Price family residence.

== Charter school applications ==
Unbound Academic Institute, an organization affiliated with Alpha School's founders, submitted applications for a cyber-based charter school in Pennsylvania, Arizona, North Carolina, Arkansas, and Utah. Of these, only Arizona approved the proposal. The Pennsylvania Department of Education denied the application in 2025, stating that the instructional model was "untested" and did not demonstrate alignment with state academic standards.

The Pennsylvania application proposed a teacherless cyber-charter model using the 2 Hour Learning platform and replacing certified teachers with "guides". The staffing plan listed 1 Head of School, 5 senior guides, 10 junior guides, and 1 special education guide for an initial enrollment of 500 students. The application did not include a physical school building, would have state testing occur in a rented space, and the listed address was a commercial mail and shipping location. The application proposed per-pupil annual fees paid to 2 Hour Learning of $5,500 per student, higher than the $2,000–$2,500 fees listed in applications in the other states.

== Schools and campuses ==
Alpha School campuses (as of April 2026)
| State | City | Grades |
|---|---|---|
| Arizona | Scottsdale | K–8 |
| California | Lake Forest | K-8 |
| California | San Francisco | K–10 |
| California | Santa Barbara | K–12 |
| Florida | Miami | K–11 |
| Florida | Palm Beach | K–6 |
| Illinois | Chicago | Pre-K–8 |
| New York | New York | Pre-K–9 |
| Texas | Austin (Alpha School) | Pre-K–8 |
| Texas | Austin (Alpha High School) (Note: Alpha High School: 201 Colorado Street, Austin, Texas 78701; grades 9-12, enrollment 152) | 9–12 |
| Texas | Brownsville | Pre-K–8 |
| Texas | Fort Worth | K–8 |
| Texas | Plano | K–8 |
| Virginia | Chantilly | K–6 |

The in-person Alpha Schools charge from $10,000 to $75,000 per student. The Alpha School co-founders and ESW Capital have implemented the use of the 2 Hour Learning model in their other schools. In 2025, the New York Times reported that there were plans to expand the Alpha School model into more than a dozen cities including New York City and Orlando.

- GT School is a private automated-teaching school for grades kindergarten–8 in Georgetown, Texas and headed by Timothy Eyerman who is affiliated with Alpha School.
- Lake Travis Sports Academy is an Austin-based private school with a focus on athletics and sports, for grades kindergarten–8.
- NextGen Academy is a private school in Austin for grades 5–8 that offers programs centered on competitive video gaming and game development.
- Novatio School is a private Arizona school launched by Ivy Xu's Toronto-based Prequel, an education company that partners with the 2 Hour Learning platform.
- Unbound Academy is a wholly-online charter school in Arizona for grades 4–8, launched by Ivy Xu's Toronto-based Prequel education company and using the 2 Hour Learning platform as well as software by IXL Learning, Khan Academy, and Amplify.

=== Cancelled schools ===
- Unbound Academic Institute was a charter school proposed for Pennsylvania by Timothy Eyerman; the state rejected the application.
- Valenta Academy was a private microschool planned to open in August 2025 in Bastrop, Texas, and a proposed charter school in Pennsylvania. Plans for the school were canceled after the Texas Education Agency vetoed its application to operate as a charter school in June 2025.

== Controversies ==
In Texas, the role of state’s top education official, Mike Morath, in getting the AI tool adopted has been the object of investigations. Promises of high performance have been difficult to realize.

== See also ==
- Educational technology – Use of technology in education to enhance learning and teaching
