= K. B. Venu =

Indian film director, author, screenwriter and actor

- Born: 19 April 1970 (age 56); Puthenvelikkara, Ernakulam
- Occupations: Film director, author

K. B. Venu (born 19 April 1970) is an Indian film director, author, screenwriter and actor who works in Malayalam film industry. He is known for his directorial August Club (2013) which was released in 2013. He won the Kerala State Film Award for Best Book on Cinema for his book, K. G. Georgente Chalachithra Yathrakal in 2015.

== Early life and career ==
Venu was born in Puthenvelikkara, Ernakulam. He completed post-graduation with MA English literature in, from Union Christian College, Aluva and Master of communication and Journalism from University of Calicut. He currently lives in Thrissur.

In 2013 he directed his debut film, August Club. It stars Rima Kallingal, Murali Gopi and Thilakan in titular roles. It tells the story about the nuances in marital life. The film's screenplay is written by Anantha Padmanabhan and is based on his novelette titled Venalinte Kalaneekkangal. He wrote the script for the film Headmaster (2022), which is based on Karoor Neelakanta Pillai’s classic short story ‘Pothichoru’.

== Filmography ==
=== As actor ===
| Year | Film | Director | Role |
|---|---|---|---|
| 2008 | Pakal Nakshatrangal | Rajeev Nath | Madhavan |
| 2010 | Aagathan | Kamal | |
| 2010 | Sufi Paranja Katha | Priyanandanan | Kesava menon |
| 2012 | Last Bench | Jiju Asokan | Professor |
| 2016 | Kappiri Thuruthu | Saheer Ali | |
| 2021 | Vishudha Rathrikal | S. Sunil | |
| 2025 | Rekhachithram | Jofin T. Chacko | film director Bharathan |

=== As screenwriter ===
| Year | Film | Director |
|---|---|---|
| 2022 | Headmaster | Rajeev Nath |

=== As director ===
| Year | Film | note |
|---|---|---|
| 2013 | August Club | |
