= Rico Roman =

American ice sled hockey player and Purple Heart recipient

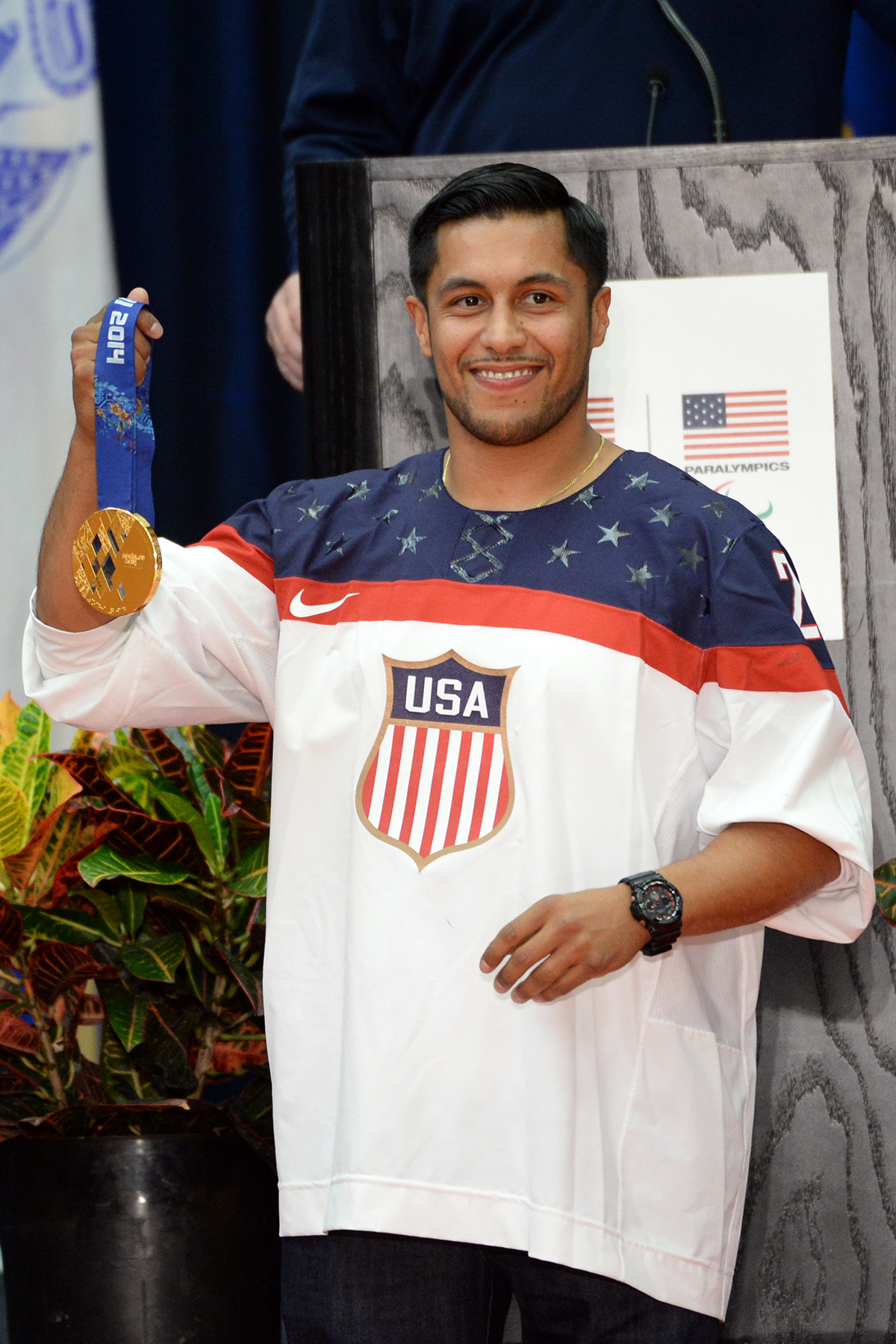
- Roman in 2014

Personal information
- Nationality: United States
- Born: February 4, 1981 (age 45) Portland, Oregon, U.S.
- Education: Alpha High School
- Height: 5 ft 9 in (175 cm)
- Weight: 180 lb (82 kg)

Sport
- Club: San Antonio Rampage
Medal record
Para ice hockey
Representing United States
Paralympic Games
Gold medal – first place	2014 Sochi	Team competition
Gold medal – first place	2018 PyeongChang	Team competition
Gold medal – first place	2022 Beijing	Team competition
World Championships
Gold medal – first place	2012 Hamar	Team competition
Gold medal – first place	2019 Ostrava	Team competition
Gold medal – first place	2021 Ostrava	Team competition
Silver medal – second place	2013 Goyang	Team competition
Silver medal – second place	2017 Gangneung	Team competition
USA Hockey Sled Cup
Gold medal – first place	2013	Team competition

Rico Roman (born February 4, 1981) is an American gold medal ice sled hockey player and Purple Heart recipient from Portland, Oregon who competed in 2014 Winter Paralympics in Sochi, Russia.

== Early life ==
Roman, who is of Mexican American descent, graduated from Alpha High School in 2000 and joined United States Army soon after. His left leg got amputated after he hit an Improvised explosive device while serving in the Iraq War in February 2007. After the injury, one of the Operation Comfort personnel have suggested him to join the San Antonio Rampage sled hockey club where he later played from 2009 to 2011 seasons.

== Career ==
In 2012 he joined Dallas Stars which he helped by winning the USA Hockey Sled Classic Division A Championship. From 2011 until now he serves on the United States National Sled Hockey Team and was a winner of the 2013 USA Hockey Sled Cup. In November 2011 he became a silver medal recipient at the IPC World Sledge Hockey Challenge and next year won gold at the same place, following by another silver in 2013. In 2012 he was awarded with a gold medal by winning the International Paralympic Committee Ice Sledge Hockey World Championship and next year won a silver one at the same place. Prior to sled hockey he was quoted saying:

They asked me to come out and play sled hockey, and I was like, I don't come from a hockey state. I'm from Oregon. We don't play hockey there. How many Hispanics do you see playing hockey?

In 2014 he got another gold medal, this time at Sochi Paralympics.
