= Rekhachithram =

2025 Indian film

- Theatrical release poster
- Directed by: Jofin T. Chacko
- Screenplay by: John Manthrickal; Ramu Sunil
- Story by: Ramu Sunil
- Produced by: Venu Kunnappilly
- Starring: Asif Ali; Anaswara Rajan
- Cinematography: Appu Prabhakar
- Edited by: Shameer Muhammed
- Music by: Mujeeb Majeed
- Production companies: Kavya Film Company; Ann Mega Media
- Distributed by: Kavya Film Company
- Release date: 9 January 2025
- Running time: 140 minutes
- Country: India
- Language: Malayalam
- Budget: ₹6–9 crore
- Box office: est. ₹57.30 crore

Rekhachithram (transl. Facial composite) is a 2025 Indian Malayalam-language mystery crime drama film directed by Jofin T. Chacko, scripted by John Manthrikal, based on a story by Ramu Sunil. The film was produced by Kavya Film Company and Ann Mega Media. It stars Asif Ali and Anaswara Rajan with Manoj K. Jayan, Siddique, Jagadish, Saikumar, Harisree Ashokan and Indrans. In Malakkappara, Vivek rejoins the police as a station house officer and takes charge of suicide case of Rajendran who revealed details on a crime he had done years ago; the investigation leads to disappearance of a young girl from the filming location of Bharathan's Kathodu Kathoram.

The filming started on 3 May 2024 and concluded on 15 July 2024. The film title was officially announced on 13 August 2024. The soundtrack and score were composed by Mujeeb Majeed. Shameer Muhammed was the editor and Appu Prabhakar the cinematographer.

It was released theatrically on 9 January 2025. It received positive reviews from critics and emerged as the eighth highest-grossing Malayalam film of 2025 so far earning more than ₹57 crore worldwide.

== Plot ==
The film opens in the past, on a dark and eerie night, where four men are seen carrying a lifeless body away from a house. Two young boys witness this mysterious scene from a distance, their curiosity piqued by the unsettling sight. The next day, one of the boys tells his friend that he saw his father acting in a movie the previous night, describing the scene of the four men carrying a body away.

The story transitions to the present day, unfolding through two parallel narratives—one following Rajendran, a wealthy and aged businessman, and the other revolving around CI Vivek Gopinath, a police officer. Rajendran is seen leaving his house with his driver. Consumed by sorrow, he drinks heavily and eventually drives himself to a secluded forest area near Malakkappara. His driver waits in the car while Rajendran searches for a particular spot in the woods, sits down, and starts a live broadcast on Facebook. In his live confession, he reveals that despite being rich now, he was once impoverished. He recounts how, in 1985, he and two others—Vakkachan and Francis Thadathil—buried a dead body beneath the very ground where he is sitting. At the end of the live video, he shoots himself to death. Meanwhile, Vivek faces suspension after being caught gambling online while on duty. His girlfriend, Sereena, a journalist, watches as the media amplifies the scandal, making Vivek an infamous public figure. He is eventually transferred to the police station in Malakkappara. On his first day, he is called to investigate a suicide case—that of Rajendran.

As Vivek and his team begin their inquiry, they dig up the area where Rajendran took his life and uncover a female skeleton, along with an anklet. With no immediate leads regarding the identity of the deceased, the investigation hits a dead end. Simultaneously, Vakkachan—now known as Vincent—is introduced as a wealthy business tycoon who is devotedly caring for his ailing wife, Alice. He discusses the emerging investigation with his legal advisor, Advocate Jacob, appearing unfazed by any potential link to his past. When summoned by the police for questioning, Vincent cooperates but leaves without raising any suspicions.

Determined to uncover the truth, Vivek sifts through police records from 1985, searching for missing persons’ cases. He visits families of the reported missing individuals, hoping to identify the skeleton or the anklet. One elderly man claims to recognize the anklet, but the lead turns out to be false. Refusing to give up, Vivek expands his search to cases involving fraud and discovers a missing case linked to a man named Chandrappan, a former production controller. Chandrappan reveals that a young woman named Rekha, a junior artist in the film Kathodu Kathoram, vanished during the film's shoot. In response, he had been forced to file a missing person's case against her, citing fraud. He identifies Rekha from an old song in the movie, helping Vivek reconstruct her image through a sketch.

When Vincent learns that Vivek has obtained a sketch of Rekha, he becomes visibly disturbed and unsettled. To suppress any further investigation, Vincent orchestrates Chandrappan's murder. Using his political connections, he ensures that Vivek is removed from the case and reassigned to traffic duty, while the Crime Branch—under Vincent's influence—takes over and systematically removes evidence that could incriminate him. Despite this setback, Vivek continues his pursuit of justice. He tracks down Pallassery, a former tabloid journalist turned vlogger, who had once extensively covered film shooting locations. Sifting through old photographs, Vivek discovers a lead—a nun named Stephy, who had once met Rekha and became very friendly with her.

Stephy recounts her encounter with Rekha during the Kathodu Kathoram shoot. They started to bond and Stephy believed that she will be a good actress. She had invited Rekha to stay overnight at their convent, located near the shooting location. The next morning, Rekha was found missing, along with large cash from the convent's safe box. To protect the convent's reputation, the nuns chose not to report the incident. However, due to delays in the film's shooting, Chandrappan was pressured into filing a fraudulent police complaint against Rekha to avoid legal repercussions from the film's producers.

Further investigation leads Vivek to Binu and Sajeevan, who had last contacted Rajendran before his suicide. Binu confesses that as a child, he was the one who witnessed his father and other men carrying a body, but his father dismissed it as a scene from Kathodu Kathoram. Over time, Binu realized the truth—that it was an actual murder and Rajendran was involved. Using this information, Binu and Sajeevan had been blackmailing Rajendran for money. They agree to testify, but before they can, they are murdered by Vincent's henchmen. Disheartened but relentless, Vivek pushes forward.

Old photographs from the film set lead him to Francis Thadathil, identified by his missing left eye. Francis finally reveals the horrifying truth of that fateful night in 1985. Vincent, then an assistant of the Bishop at the convent, had been stealing small items, assisted by a cleaner named Pushpam. One night, Pushpam concocted a plan to rob the convent's safe, roping Vincent into her scheme. To frame Rekha for the crime, Pushpam killed her by strangling. Francis and Rajendran, stumbling upon the scene, agreed to help dispose of the body in exchange for a share of the stolen money. They buried Rekha in the forest, a secret that remained hidden until Rajendran's confession decades later.

Vivek confronts Vincent at the hospital where Alice, is receiving treatment. He sends Alice a bouquet with a note reading: “Get well soon, Pushpam”. Vincent and Vivek exchange knowing glances—Pushpam has been unmasked as Alice. Determined to bring justice to Rekha, Vivek exposes Vincent's past to his own son. Shaken by the revelation, Vincent's son confronts his parents, demanding the truth. Realizing their inevitable downfall, Vincent, overcome with grief, kills Pushpam to prevent her from facing legal consequences. A breakthrough comes when actor Jagadish contacts Vivek, revealing that Rekha used to write letters to him. Following Jagadish's guidance, Vivek tracks down Rekha's family in Kanyakumari, where her sister Asha confirms the anklet's identity. Asha reminisces about Rekha's passion for cinema and her admiration for actor Mammootty, to whom she had frequently written letters seeking an autographed picture. With Vincent arrested, Rekha's remains are finally laid to rest with dignity by Vivek, Stephy and Asha. In a poignant moment, Jagadish hands Vivek an envelope containing an autograph of Mammootty—one that had been meant for Rekha. Vivek delivers it to Asha, fulfilling a long-lost dream of the deceased.

In a Post-Credit Scene, Back in Kanyakumari, a young and hopeful Rekha notices a casting call for a lead actress in an upcoming Mammootty film, directed by K.G. George—her dream within reach, frozen in time.

== Cast ==
- Anaswara Rajan as Rekha Pathrose, an aspiring actress and fan of Mammootty
- Asif Ali as CI Vivek Gopinath
- Manoj K. Jayan as Vincent "Vakkachan"
  - Unni Lalu as Young Vakkachan
- Siddique as Rajendran "Rajan"
  - Shaheen Siddique as Young Rajan
- Jagadish as Himself (Extended Cameo)
- Saikumar as Francis Thadathil
  - Shajeer P. Basheer as Young Francis
- Harisree Ashokan as Gopinath, Vivek's father
- Indrans as Chandrappan, Kathodu Kathoram Production Controller
- Saleema as Pushpam "Alice", Vincent's wife
  - Zarin Shihab as Young Pushpam, Vakkachan's girlfriend
- Bhama Arun as Sereena, Vivek's girlfriend and journalist
- Megha Thomas as Sister Stephy, Rekha's friend
- Nishanth Sagar as DYSP Mohandas
- Srikant Murali as Forensic Surgeon Dr. Sajan
- T. G. Ravi as Pallasheri, a film tabloid journalist
  - Sreejith Ravi as Young Pallasheri
- Priyanka Nair as Asha Pathrose, Rekha's sister
- Nandu as Pathrose, Rekha's father
- Sudhi Koppa as Sajeevan
- Vijay Menon as Adv. Jacob, Vincent's lawyer
- Shaju Sreedhar as CI Salim, Crime Branch
- Sanju Sanichen as Vincent's son
- Anuroop Pas SI Shinto
- Jayashankar as Mathai's Son
- Dileep Menon as SP Yasin Iqbal IPS
- Arun Sankaran Pavumba as SI John
- Unni Chittur as Thomachan, Gopinath's Friend
- Pauly Valsan as Vincent's aunt
- Akhil Shylaja Sasidharan as Young Saroj Padi
- K. B. Venu as Bharathan
- Kamal as Himself (cameo appearance)
  - Jenuse Mohamed as Young Kamal
- John Paul as Himself (archived footage)
  - Devendranath as Young John Paul
- Mammootty as himself (voice over in the climax)
  - Twinkle Surya as body double for Mammootty with the use of Artificial Intelligence from Kathodu Kathoram shooting location (Cameo)
- Meenaraj Palluruthy as Mathai
- Selvan as Baby
- Jayashree Sivadas as Herself (Cameo)
- K. R. Nayar as the Bishop (Cameo)

== Production ==
=== Development ===
Mammootty's The Priest (2021) director Jofin T Chacko's next film was launched on May 3, 2024, featuring Asif Ali, Anaswara Rajan, Zarin Shihab and Manoj K Jayan. It is scripted by John Manthrikal, based on a story by Ramu Sunil. The film is jointly produced by Venu Kunnappilly's Kavya Film Company and Anto Joseph’s Ann Mega Media. Official title was announced on August 13, 2024 titled Rekhachithram with a tagline "An Alternate History". The cast also includes Siddique, Indrans, Bhama Arun, Megha Thomas, Nishanth Sagar, Harisree Ashokan, Shrikant Murali, Sudhi Koppa, Priyanka, Jagadish, Saikumar, Nandu, Vijay Menon, TG Ravi, Sreejith Ravi, and Pauly Wilson. On the technical front, it had cinematographer Appu Prabhakar, music composer Rahul Raj and editor Shameer Muhammed. Rahul Raj who was part of the film during the announcement opted out eventually, for reasons unknown. Mujeeb Majeed was then selected to compose for the film.

=== Filming ===
The film went on floors on May 3, 2024, at Fort Kochi. Filming was wrapped on 15 July 2024.

== Release ==
Rekhachithram was released theatrically on 9 January 2025.

The film started streaming on SonyLIV on 7 March 2025.

== Reception ==
=== Critical response ===
Rekhachithram received positive reviews from critics.

Anandu Suresh of The Indian Express gave a rating of 3 out of 5 mentioning "Unlike typical althist films, which reimagine an important, highly influential moment from the past to explore speculative outcomes, Rekhachithram takes an intriguing approach by choosing the production period of a movie, a seemingly less impactful event, as its historical touchpoint and John Manthrickal and Ramu Sunil, who penned the screenplay, handle it well." Writing for The Hindu, Shilpa Nair Anand said, "Jofin T Chacko's film stirs nostalgia like no other in recent times. It is a cinephile's love note to Malayalam cinema, perhaps to the movies and technicians who might have kindled his love for cinema. The writing is intelligent, the past and the future organically weave in and out of the narrative. Where it is not and lags a wee bit, it is forgivable for the sheer inventiveness of the movie to tell a story where the past and the present crisscross effortlessly." Sajin Shrijith of The Week rated the film with 3.5/5 stars, stated that, "The film is a straightforward thriller that doesn't pretend to be anything more and gives an old-school quality to the viewers like Ee Kanni Koodi or any of K. Madhu-S. N. Swamy classics". He concluded that, "Rekhachithram appeals to the hardcore cinephile just like all of us".

Princy Alexander of Onmanorama wrote, "Rekhachithram featuring Asif Ali and Anaswara Rajan is an overall experiment, treading on a path that many filmmakers, including veterans, have not dared to do in the past. Many of the ingredients in the film makes do with the same elements used in investigation thrillers like Paapan and Ozler, but what it truly differs in is its premise and the film's unique treatment." Cris of The News Minute mentioned, "Director Jofin T Chacko does not try to force nostalgia into the mood, but manages to weave in backstories of known films and artists, creating an alternate reality that rouses the film lover in you." Writing for Cinema Express, Vivek Santhosh said: "The real masterstroke of Rekhachithram lies in its unique backdrop, just like the filmmaker kept on promising during promotional interviews. The film isn't just set in the present—it also revisits the making of the 1985 film Kathodu Kathoram, directed by Bharathan and starring Mammootty. By weaving its story around the production of a real film, Rekhachithram does something few Indian films have attempted: it crafts an alternate history, one that feels entirely plausible." Gopika IS of The Times of India rated the film with 3.5/5 stars, stating "Rekhachithram as a subtle and remarkably interlinked film made with considerable research as the investigation story reminds a puzzle put together from the beginning", concluding as "the director has delivered a solid film".

=== Box office ===
The film earned ₹1.90 crore on its opening day at the Kerala box office and ₹2.10 crore the next day to a total of ₹4 crore in Kerala. It grossed ₹10.50 crore from Kerala in its first 4-day weekend. The total global opening weekend collection (4 days) was ₹26.50 crore.

In 8 days, it grossed ₹16.10 crore at the Kerala box office. In 12 days, it grossed ₹48.75 crore globally with Kerala gross reaching ₹21.65 crore. The film grossed ₹50 crore globally on its 14th day. In 18 days it grossed ₹25 crore from Kerala, Rest of India contributed around ₹4.75 crore, taking the total India gross to ₹29.75 crore while overseas grossed over ₹24.25 crore to a worldwide gross of ₹54 crore. The final gross was estimated to be ₹57.30 crore.
