= M. R. Renukumar =

Malayalam poet (born 1969)

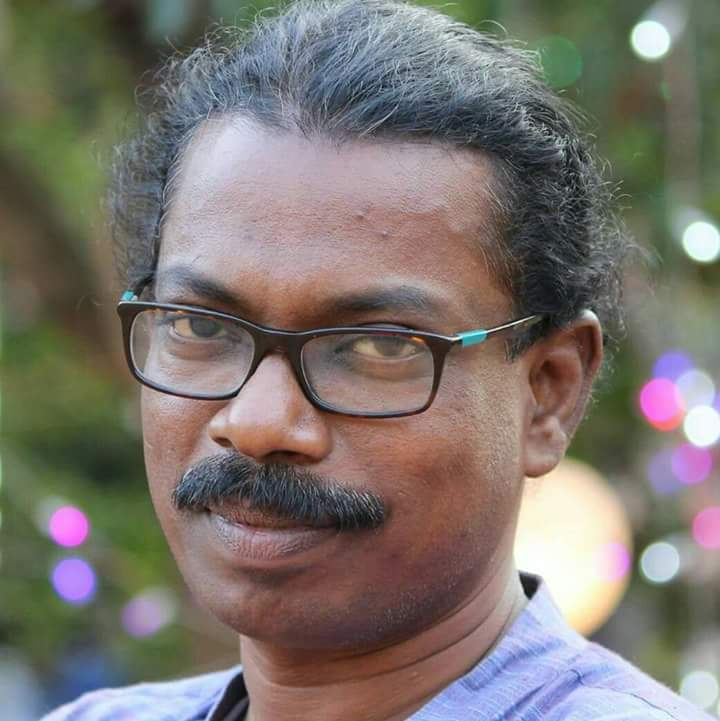
- Born: 8 February 1969; Kottayam, Kerala
- Occupations: Writer, poet, painter
- Spouse: Rekha Raj
- Writing career
- Genre: poetry
- Notable work: Kothiyan
- Notable awards: 2019 Kerala Sahitya Akademi Award for Poetry; 2009 Kerala State Institute for Childrens Literature Best short story; 2008 SBT Kavitha award; SBT Kavitha award

M. R. Renukumar (born 8 February 1969) is a poet who writes in Malayalam. He is also a short story writer, biographer, essayist, translator and painter. He is a recipient of the 2019 Kerala Sahitya Akademi Award for Poetry.

== Biography ==
M. R. Renukumar was born on 8 February 1969, in Kottayam, a central district of Kerala. He was born to Thankamma and Raghavan. He is married to Rekha Raj and the couple has a son, Raghav. He was the Kalaprathibha of MG University Youth festival of 1994. He took M.Phil. in economics from Centre for Development Studies (CDS) affiliated to Jawaharlal Nehru University. His day job is with the State Audit Department at Kottayam.

== Career ==
Renukumar published four collections of poetry. Keninilangail (In marshy lands, 2005), Veshakkaya (The fruit of knowledge, 2007) Pachakkuppi (Green bottle, 2011) and Kothiyan (2017). His other works include Naalaam classile varaal (Snakehead fish in the fourth standard, 2008), Poykayil Yohannan (2009, biography of the activist, poet and socio-religious reformer of the same name), Muzhusooryan aakaanulla shramangal (Attempts to be a full blown sun, 2013) a book of essays and reminiscences, Aracycle (Half Cycle, 2016), Koottu koodunna kathakal (Friendly Stories, 2017)and Ayyankali: Jeevithavum Idapedalukalum (Ayyankali: Life and Interventions, 2017), biography of Ayyankali the renowned social reformer of Kerala. He has translated the graphic biography of B.R. Ambedkar, Bhimayana: Experiences of Untouchability, from English into Malayalam (2014). He edited and prefaced Dalit Short Stories from Malayalam under the title 'Njaarukal' in 2014 and later it was translated to English as 'Don't Want Caste' in 2017 by Navayana publications. He has also written a song for the Sudhi Anna film, Poyyamozhi.

== Political perspective in writing ==
Poetry is a medium for him to recapture the life and dreams of people, historically oppressed by the caste system and slavery, presently called Dalits who were excluded, underestimated, otherised, and demoralised by the mainstream literature based on hegemonic aesthetics and sensibility. He writes poetry for socio-political rather than personal reasons. He is trying to problematise the so-called syllabi of Malayalam literature with a different vocabulary, images, experiences and identical descends.

== Awards ==
He received SBT Kavitha award for 'Veshakkaya' in 2008 and award for Best short story collection to 'Naalam Classile Varaal' by the Kerala State Institute for Children's Literature in 2009. In 2018, for the book 'Aracycle' he received FOKANA award for Children's Literature. His poetry anthology, Kothiyan was selected for the 2019 Kerala Sahitya Akademi Award for Poetry, which was announced in 2021.
