= Eric Feng =

American software engineer and business executive

- Education: University of Texas at Austin (BS)
- Occupations: Software engineer; business executive; financier

Eric Feng is an American software engineer, business executive, and financier. He is a former general partner at the venture capital firm Kleiner Perkins Caulfield & Byers, where he focused on leading early stage consumer investments before leaving in 2018. Previously he was CTO of Kleiner Perkins portfolio company Flipboard, along with other companies.

== Early life and education ==
From Texas, Feng earned his B.S. degree in electrical engineering from the University of Texas at Austin in 1999, and received the IEC Everitt Award as the top graduating engineering student.

== Career ==
He started his professional career at Trilogy Software, where he cofounded Uberworks.com, which was later acquired by a publicly traded Network Commerce in 2000. He went on to hold leadership positions at Microsoft Research, working with the Microsoft China research lab in Beijing as a program manager. In Beijing he co-founded and served as CEO of the online video platform startup called Mojiti, which was acquired by Hulu in 2007. As part of the acquisition, Feng joined Hulu as the founding CTO and head of product.

In 2010, Feng joined Kleiner Perkins and focused on sustainability and digital media investments, also becoming chief of staff to Kleiner Perkins partner Al Gore. Between 2011 and 2015, Feng incubated and worked at Kleiner Perkins portfolio companies Erly, Airtime Media, and Flipboard, before rejoining Kleiner Perkins in 2015 as a general partner focused on early-stage consumer investing. By 2016 he had led an investment into Handshake, a career network for college students, and was involved in the funding of the dollar store goods e-commerce stores Hollar and BorderX Lab. He also recently started locating the video essentials e-commerce mobile platform Packagd. He left Kleiner Perkins in 2018.
