= Naren =

Naren is a given name in various cultures.

In Inner Mongolia, Naren is a Chinese transcription of the Mongolian word naran (наран), meaning "sun".

People with this name include:

- Naren Tamhane (1931–2002), Indian cricketer
- Naren Ray (1940–2003), Indian Bengali cartoonist
- Naren Bakshi (born 1943), Indian-born American entrepreneur
- Naren Gupta (1948–2021), Indian venture capitalist
- Naren Hua (born 1962), Chinese actress of Mongolian descent
- Naren Shankar (born 1964), American screenwriter of Indian descent
- Naren Weiss (born 1991), American actor of Indian descent
- Naren Reddy (born 1994), Indian cricketer
- Naren Solano (born 1996), Colombian football forward
