= Hallelooya =

- Official poster
- Directed by: Sudhi Anna
- Screenplay by: S. A. Abhiman; Suniraj Kasyap
- Produced by: K. M. Surendran
- Starring: Narain; Meghna Raj; Sudheer Karamana; Sunil Sukhada
- Cinematography: Rakesh Narayanan
- Edited by: Ragesh Narayanan
- Music by: Chandran Ramamangalam
- Production company: Barking Dogs Seldom Bite Films
- Release date: 20 May 2016
- Country: India
- Language: Malayalam

Hallelooya (or Hallelujah) is a 2016 Malayalam-language film, directed by Sudhi Anna in his feature film debut, starring Narain and Meghana Raj in the lead roles. It also features Sudheer Karamana, Sunil Sukhada, K. B. Ganesh Kumar, Sasi Kalinga, Saju Navodaya and Master Eric in significant roles. The film, produced by K. M. Surendran under the banner of Barking Dogs Seldom Bite Films, was released in May 2016.

== Plot ==
After living 23 years in France, psychiatrist Dr. Roy (Narain) is called back to his village by Fr. Francis, the man who raised him during his childhood. He has no idea why he was asked back. When he returns, he meets his childhood friend, Dr. Meera Menon (Meghna Raj), who has become a pediatrician. Meeting her again brings him memories of their being in love years back.

== Cast ==
- Narain as Dr. Roy
- Meghna Raj as Dr. Meera Menon
- Sudheer Karamana as Thoma
- Sunil Sukhada as Sreedharan Unnithan
- K. B. Ganesh Kumar as Father Chandy
- Sasi Kalinga as Outha
- Saju Navodaya as Uthaman
- Sajitha Madathil as Mary
- Devi Ajith as Susi Teacher
- Shobha Mohan as Dr. Sudha Menon
- Gayatri as Kunjamma
- Rajmohan Unnithan
- Jeeja Surendran as Vilasini
- Master Eric Zachariah as Young Roy
- Baby Durga Premjith as Young Meera
- Kalabhavan Niyaz as Susheelan
- Chali Pala as S.I. Isaac
- Shivaji Guruvayoor as Lazer Sir
- Poojappura Radhakrishnan as Cheriyachan
- Ancy as Sreeja
- Vinod Kedamangalam as Cheeran

== Soundtrack ==
Track list
| No. | Title | Singer(s) | Length |
|---|---|---|---|
| 1. | "Inaale Ennoru" | Boban Vijayan | 5:14 |
| 2. | "En Kinavile" | Unni Menon | 4:41 |
| Total length: | | | 09:55 |
