= Rekha Raj =

Indian thinker, activist and writer (born 1978)

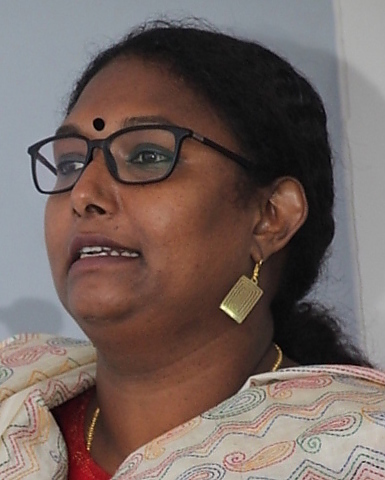
- Born: 5 May 1978 (age 48); Kottayam, Kerala, India
- Occupations: Writer; Dalit activist; assistant professor
- Years active: 1990–present
- Spouse: M. R. Renukumar

Rekha Raj (born 5 May 1978) is a Dalit and feminist thinker, social activist and writer.

== Early life ==
Raj was born to K P Nalinakshi and S Rajappan on 5 May 1978 in Kottayam, a central district of Kerala. She lives with her husband M. R. Renukumar and son. With a PhD in philosophy under the title "Politics of Gender and Dalit Identity: Representation of Dalit Women in Contemporary Dalit Discourses in Kerala", she was working as assistant professor at the School of Gandhian Thought and Development Studies in Mahatma Gandhi University, however her appointment was annulled by the High Court of Kerala citing irregularities in the appointment.

== Works ==
Raj has written a book titled Dalit Sthree Idapedalukal in 2015, which was translated into Tamil in 2017. She was a guest editor of the Sanghaditha magazine special issue on Dalit Women in 2013. She has written many articles both in academic and other magazines including Economic and Political Weekly, Mathrubhumi, Samakalika Malayalam Vaarika, Madhyamam Weekly and many other current periodicals in India. Her areas of academic interest are extended to gender, development, ethnic, cultural, Dalit and subaltern studies.
