= State Central Library, Kerala =

Public library in Kerala, India

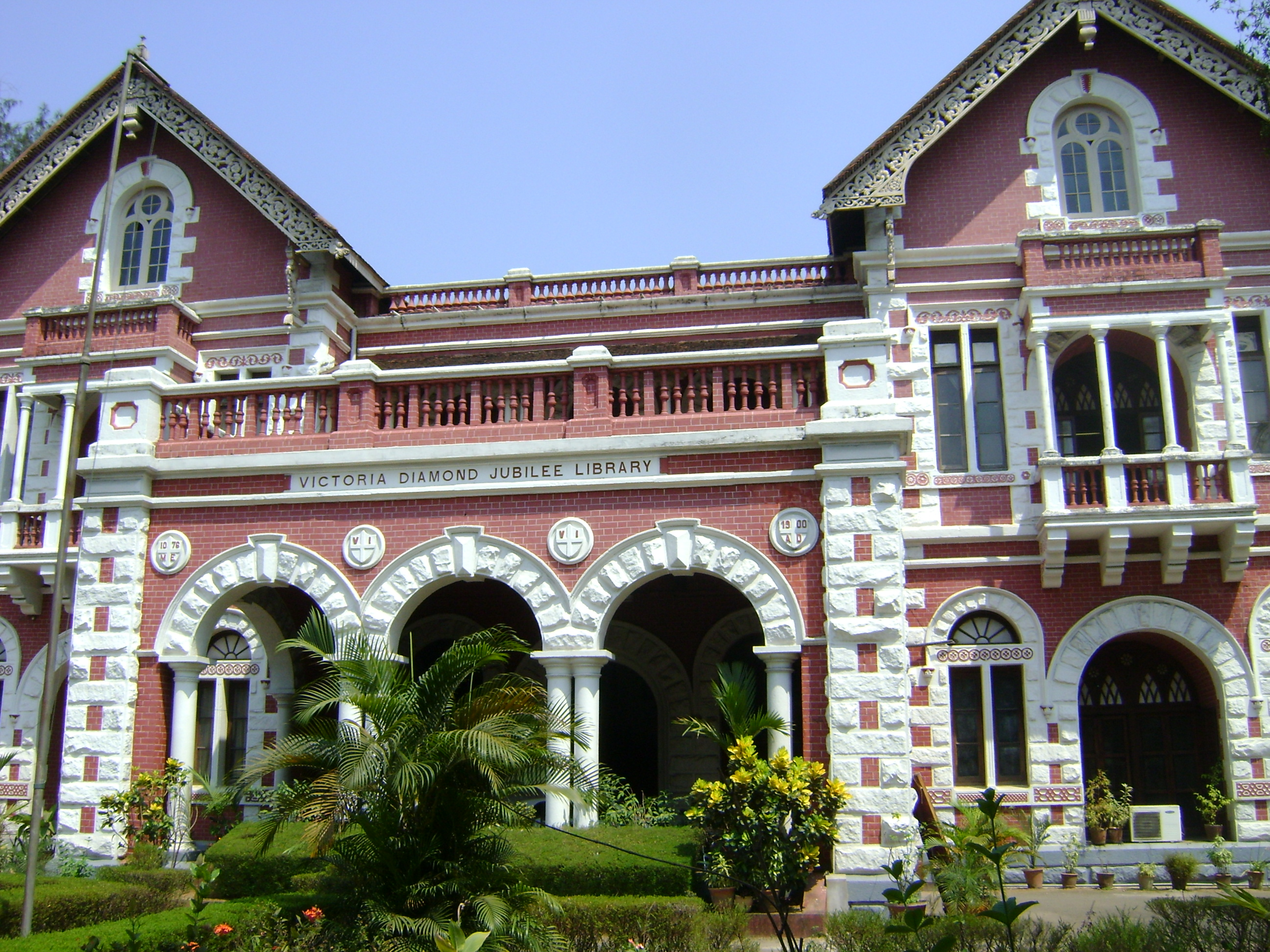
- 8.506392°N 76.952244°E
- Location: Palayam, Thiruvananthapuram, India
- Type: Public library

Other information
- Website: www.statelibrary.kerala.gov.in

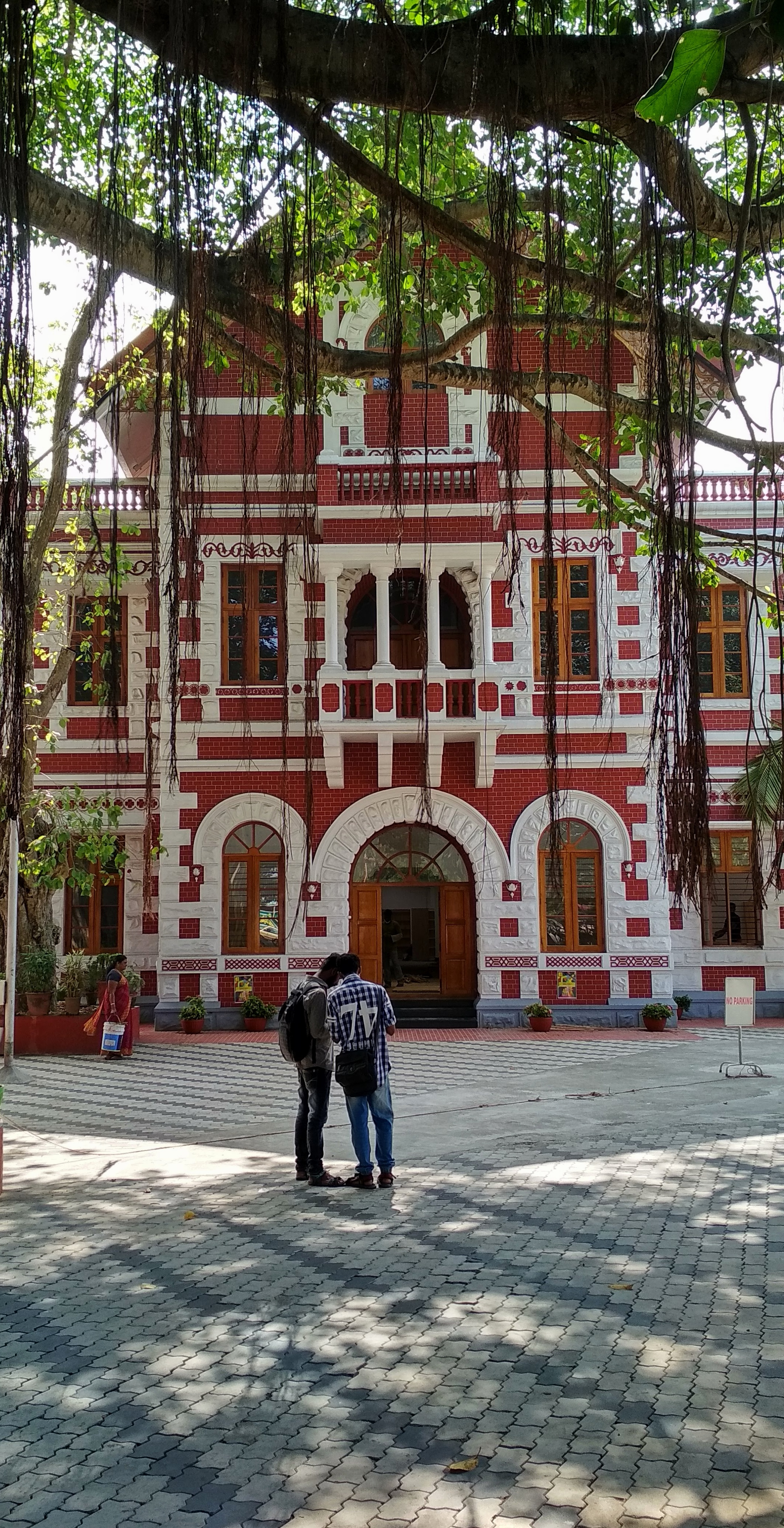
Central Library Main Building

State Central Library of Kerala, also known as Thiruvananthapuram Public Library, is a public library in Thiruvananthapuram, the capital of Kerala.

== History ==
The library was established in 1829 during the reign of King Swathi Thirunal of Travancore. The work of starting and organising the library was entrusted to Edward Cadogan, a British resident and the grandson of British Museum founder Hans Sloane. Cadogan was the first president of the Thiruvananthapuram Public Library committee, which managed the affairs of the library. At that time, only a privileged class who were called to attend the Durbar of the king was allowed admission to the library. In 1898 it was opened to the public and became known as "Thiruvananthapuram People’s Library".

Other landmarks in the history of the library:

- 1900 - Sree Moolam Thirunal constructed the present building for housing the library, which is an architectural beauty of gothic architecture, in commemoration of the Diamond Jubilee of Queen Victoria.
- 1938 - The administration of the Thiruvananthapuram Public Library was handed over to University of Travancore (now University of Kerala).
- 1948 - The state government was directed to take over the administration of the library from the university by a resolution of the state legislature.
- 1958 - The library was declared as the ‘State Central Library’ of Kerala.
- 1988 - The library was given the status of a minor department under the administrative control of Higher Education Department of Government of Kerala.
- 2005 - A New Heritage Model building was constructed within the campus for children's library.
- 2007- Online reservation and RF ID facility was introduced.
- 2016- First transgender membership card issued to Sheethal Shyam, a transgender activist.

== Sections ==
1. Technical Department
2. Malayalam Library
3. English Library
4. Circulation Section (Books & Periodicals)
5. Hindi / Sanskrit Section
6. Reference Section
7. Children's Library
8. Binding Section
9. Reprographic Section
10. Closed Reference Section
11. Members Reading Room (For A & B Members only)
12. General Reading Room (For C & D Members & Non-Members)
13. Cash Section
14. Library Office
15. Internet Browsing Centre
16. Kerala Gazette Section
17. Multimedia Section
18. Digital Library
19. British Library Collection

=== Digital library ===
The library has a searchable digital collection containing 707 rare documents, in English and Malayalam, and 480 digitised books in English.

=== Children's library ===
The New Heritage Model building within the campus is devoted for children's library. A multimedia section is also functioning in this building.

The library is also conducting a certificate course in library and information science.
