= Sudhi Anna =

Indian film director and painter

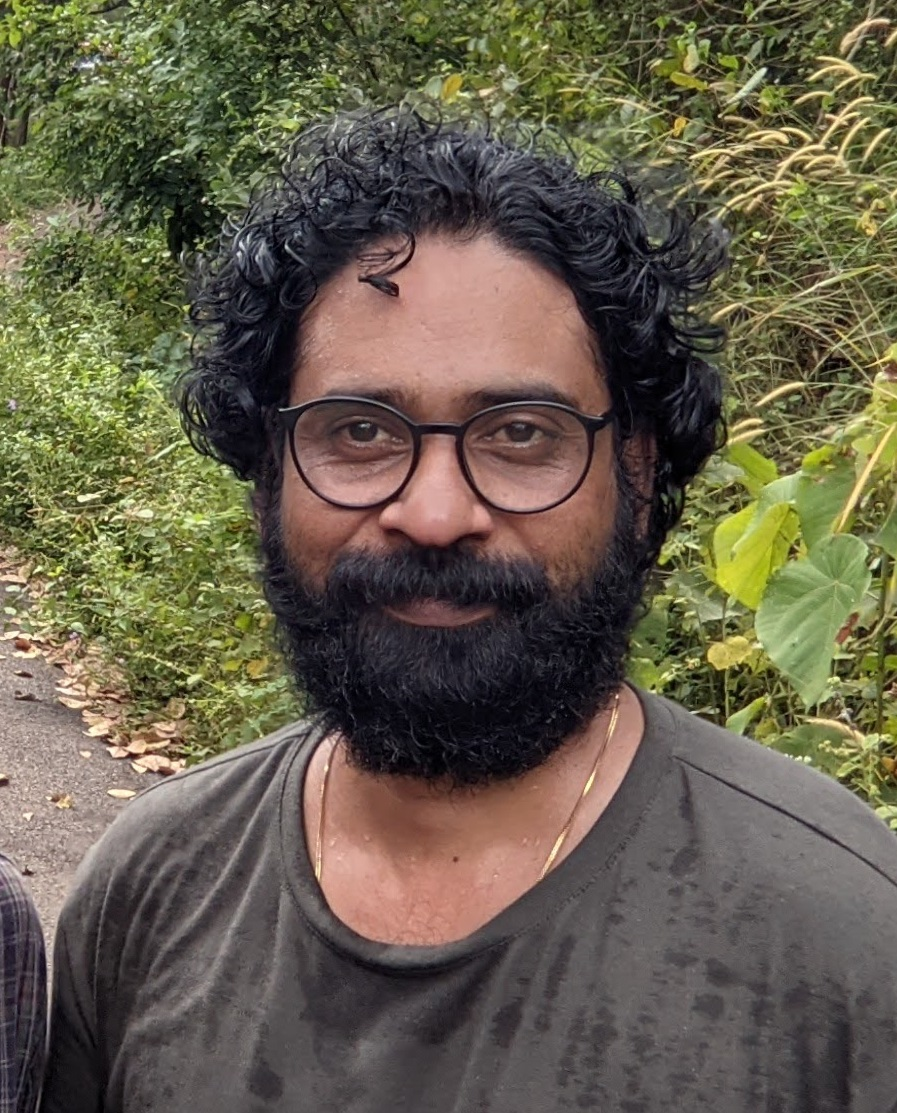
- Born: Padiyoor, Kannur district, Kerala, India
- Occupations: Film director, painter
- Years active: Since 2012
- Awards: J. C. Foundation Award; Best Director Cannes 7th Art Awards

Sudhi Anna is an Indian film director and painter, who works predominantly in Malayalam cinema. He is known for Hallelooya, a film featuring Naren and Meghana Raj in the lead roles. He is a recipient of J. C. Foundation Award for young director, instituted in memory of filmmaker J. C. Kuttikkad. He received the Best Director Award at the 2025 Cannes 7th Art Awards and the Josh Burton Award For Creative Excellence at the Beloit International Film Festival in 2025.

== Biography ==
Sudhi was born in Padiyoor, a small town in Kannur district in the south Indian state of Kerala, in a family which nurtured art; his elder brother, S. Sunil is a known filmmaker who has directed three films viz. Kaliyorukkam, Marubhagham and Visudha Rathrikal. His debut film was Song of Solomon in 2012, which had Sam Jeevan and Divya Das in the lead roles; Mohanlal provided the voice over for the film. He wrote the story and screenplay for the film while Ragesh Narayanan did the cinematography and editing. His next project was Khadolkhachan, a bilingual film in Malayalam and Tamil, starring Vidharth and Shine Tom Chacko, but the film did not materialize. Subsequently, he made Hallelooya, a love story featuring Narain and Meghana Raj and the film was released in May 2016, and was a comeback vehicle for Narain. The screenplay was written by Abhimaan and Suniraj, who were also associated with another Nivin Pauly starrer, Neram. The film, which featured a poem by the Indian Police Service officer, B. Sandhya, fetched him the J. C. Foundation Award for the young director. His latest film, Poyyamozhi, had its premiere at Cannes Film Market on 19 May 2024. The film has Jaffar Idukki in the lead.

Sudhi, who has also conducted several exhibitions of his photographs, drawings and paintings, lives at his riverside house on the banks of Vembuzha River in Kannur with his wife and daughter.

== Filmography ==
Year	Title	Cast	Status
2012	Song of Solomon	Sam Jeevan, Divya Das	Released
2016	Khadolkhachan	Vidharth, Shine Tom Chacko	Aborted
2016	Hallelooya	Narain, Meghana Raj	Released
2024	Poyyamozhi	Jaffar Idukki, Nathaniel	Released
