= Vishudha Rathrikal =

- Directed by: S. Sunil
- Written by: S. Sunil
- Produced by: Latheesh Krishnan; Rajesh Kanjirakkadan; Jaison Jose; T. K. Reena; S. Sunil
- Starring: Sandra Larwin; Sheethal Shyam; Honey Vinu; Deepthi Kalyani; Monisha; K. B. Venu
- Cinematography: Sunny Joseph; Ramachandran; Sakyadeb Chowdhuri
- Edited by: Viji Abhraham
- Music by: Sachin Balu
- Production companies: Poothottan's Cinema; Film Nomads
- Distributed by: Saina Play
- Release date: 21 May 2021
- Running time: 93 minutes
- Country: India
- Language: Malayalam

Vishudha Rathrikal (lit. 'Holy Nights') is a 2021 Malayalam language anthology drama film written, directed and coproduced by S. Sunil. Released through the OTT platform Saina Play, the film takes on five subjects occurring over five nights.

== Cast ==
- Sandra Larwin as monisha
- Sheethal Shyam
- Honey Vinu
- Deepthi Kalyani
- Monisha
- K. B. Venu

== Release ==
The film was released on 21 May 2021 through the OTT platform Saina Play.
