= Sheethal Shyam =

Indian transgender activit

- Born: Shyam C. S. September 3, 1982 (age 43); Thrissur, Kerala, India
- Occupations: Activist, writer, actor, public speaker
- Known for: Transgender rights activism
- Awards: Kerala government's Trans Achieve Award.

Sheethal Shyam (born Shyam C. S., on September 3, 1982) is an Indian transgender activist, writer, actor, and public speaker from Kerala. In 2016, she received the Trans Achiever Award by the social justice department, Government of Kerala.

== Early life and background ==
Sheethal Shyam was born as Shyam C. S. on September 3, 1982, in Thrissur, Kerala, India, into a middle class Roman Catholic family; her father was an auto-rickshaw driver and her mother a homemaker.

She experienced gender dysphoria from an early age and faced discrimination and violence during her school years, which led her to discontinue formal education. After dropping out of school, she worked at various places, including an aluminum company, a studio, and the construction industry, but faced discrimination everywhere for dressing as a woman, and decided to leave Thrissur and move to Bangalore.

After moving to Bengaluru in 2001, she came in contact with Sangama, an LGBT rights group. She later returned to Kerala and now lives with her partner Smintoj.

== Activism ==
Sheethal Shyam has been active in LGBTQIA+ and transgender rights movements in Kerala for more than two decades. She was a founding member of Queer Pride Keralam in 2009, a collective advocating equality and visibility for sexual and gender minorities.

In 2012, she served as secretary of the Sexual Minorities Forum Kerala (SMFK) and contributed to India's first transgender survey. She has also been associated with the formulation and advocacy processes surrounding Kerala's transgender policy, one of the earliest state-level transgender welfare policies in India and also served as a member on the Kerala State Transgender Justice Board, the first transgender justice board formed in India.

She founded an organization called Voice in Thrissur to bring the issues of transgender communities to the attention of the general public. In 2017, she founded Dhwaya, an organisation promoting artistic opportunities and empowerment within transgender communities. In 2018, she established Mazhavil Dwani, described as Kerala's first transgender theatre troupe.

Sheethal served as a Councilor and later Manager of the Pehachan Project, a five-year project, aims to provide HIV prevention services for men who have sex with men (MSM), transgender and hijata communities.

Sheetal was the first one to receive an IFFK transgender pass. She was also the first to receive a transgender membership card from State Central Library established in 1829 in Kerala.

Shyam frequently participates in literary festivals, academic forums, and cultural events across India, speaking on gender identity, representation, and social inclusion.

== Cultural and media career ==
As a columnist, she wrote Kerala's first queer column in the Mathrubhumi Azhchappathippu.

She has acted in the films Ka Bodyscapes (2016), Aabhaasam (2017), Otta (2021), Vishudha Rathrikal (2021), STD XE 99 Batch (2023), and the short films Wedding, Avalotoppam, Color of Trance, Chilar, and Chalanam.

She participated as the guest of honor of the government at the 2016 International Film Festival of Kerala (IFFK) and also served as a delegate committee member at the 2021 IFFK.

In 2018, she formed the first transgender theatre group in Kerala called Mazhavil Dhvani and took the initiative to present the play Parayan Maranna Kathakal (meaning:Stories forgotten to tell) in various states of India. In 2019, she was appointed as the Assistant Stage Manager at the ITFOK (International Theatre Festival Of Kerala) by the Kerala Sangeetha Nataka Akademi.

== Awards and honors ==
Sheethal Shyam received many other awards including the Kerala government's Trans Achieve Award, Born to Win Award, Kudumbashree Vaibhav Award, Movie Street Award, Nizhalattam Award, and George Kunnappilly Award.

As an actress Sheetal Shyam won the best actress award at the street film festival 'Nizhalattam' organized by Manaviyyam in Thiruvananthapuram. She received the award for her performance in 'Avalkkoopam', directed by Kuku Babu.
