= Poyyamozhi =

- Film poster
- Directed by: Sudhi Anna
- Written by: Sarath Chandran
- Screenplay by: Sarath Chandran
- Produced by: Josekutty Madathil
- Starring: Jaffar Idukki; Nathaniel Madathil; Meenakshi Anoop
- Cinematography: Vinod Illampally
- Edited by: Akhil Prakash
- Music by: Bijibal
- Release dates: 19 May 2024 (Cannes Festival); 11 September 2025 (OTT premiere)
- Country: India
- Language: Malayalam

Poyyamozhi is a 2024 Indian Malayalam-language film, directed by Sudhi Anna. The film stars Jaffar Idukki, Nathaniel Madathil and Meenakshi Anoop. The film which was shot in the hilly areas of Poombarai, Kodaikanal and Vagamon, was premiered at Cannes Film Market on 19 May 2024. Cannes 7th Art Awards selected the film for awards in two categories, Best Director Award for Sudhi Anna and Best Cinematography Award for Vinod Illampally.

== Plot ==
The film tells the story of Poyyamozhi (Jaffar Idukki) who guides Jason, a character played by a newcomer, Nathaniel Madathil), through a forest. The journey turns out to be hunter and prey chase and the film shows the interaction between the hunter and the prey.

== Cast ==
- Jaffar Idukki
- Nathaniel Madathil
- Meenakshi Anoop

== Technical Associates ==
Poyyamozhi was produced by Josekutty Madathil under the banner, Tiny Hands Productions. The story and screenplay was by Sarath Chandran and Bijibal scored the music for the song written by M. R. Renukumar. Vinod Illampally handled the cinematography and editing was done by Akhil Prakash.

Title	Name
Executive producer	Shiji Mathew Cherukara
Chief associate director	Rennet
Assistant director	Abhijith Surya
Production controller	Santhosh Cherupoyka
Art direction	Nathan Mannur
Colorist	Jayadev Thiruveypati
Sound design	Thapas Naik
Make up	Ronex Xavier
Costume design	Rose Ragis
Stills	Jayaprakash
Action	Alwyn Alex
Office control	A. V. Hareesh
Online media	Manju Gopinath
Public relations officer	A. S. Dinesh

== Awards and recognitions ==
Poyyamozhi was officially selected to a number of international film festivals. Cannes 7th Art Awards selected the director, Sudhi Anna as the Best Director and Vinod Illampally as the Best Cinematographer in 2025. The Summer Edition of Red Movie Awards chose Nathaniel Madathil for a special mention in the Best Actor category. The film won the Best Feature Film award at the Top Indie Film Festival. The film received the Best Feature Film Award at the Los Angeles Global Film Festival Awards in June 2024 and the director, Sudhi Anna, got the Josh Burton Award For Creative Excellence at the Beloit International Film Festival in 2025.
