= Joe Liemandt =

American billionaire businessman

- Born: Joseph Liemandt; 1967 or 1968 (age 57–58)
- Education: Stanford University (dropped out)
- Occupation: Businessman
- Known for: Founder, Trilogy Software and ESW Capital

Joseph Liemandt (born 1967/1968) is an American billionaire businessman, and the founder of Trilogy Software, and ESW Capital, an investment company that buys software companies. As of April 2025, his net worth is estimated at $6.2 billion.

Liemandt attended Stanford University, but dropped out to start Trilogy Software. In 1996, he was the youngest self-made person on the Forbes 400, with a net worth of $500 million.

As of 2025, he is the principal of Alpha School, a teacherless AI-driven teaching program and school for children.

Liemandt lives in Austin, Texas.

== Political contributions ==
Joe Liemandt and his wife Andra Liemandt contribute to Republican, Democratic, and Libertarian parties and candidates.

- 2009–2012: Gave $130,000 to the Libertarian National Committee.
- 2012: Gave $100,000 to Gary Johnson's 2012 presidential campaign.
- 2012: Gave $107,400 to Barack Obama's re-election campaign and the Democratic National Committee, and bundled more than $200,000 for his campaign. In March 2012, they were invited guests to the State Dinner at the White House in honor of Prime Minister David Cameron and Samantha Cameron.
- 2013: Gave $150,000 to the Libertarian PAC supporting Robert Sarvis's 2013 campaign for Virginia governor.
- 2020: Gave $250,000 to Donald Trump's presidential campaign.
- 2023: Reportedly funneled $1 million to Glenn Youngkin's gubernatorial campaign using an LLC created the day before that was registered to the address of his private companies' CFO.

They also are engaged in Austin and Texas politics.

- 2016: Gave $20,000 to the Austin4All PAC in a 2016 effort to recall Austin City Council member Ann Kitchen, when she voted in favor of fingerprint-based background checks for ride-hailing services like Uber and Lyft.
- 2021: Gave $75,000 to the Save Austin Now PAC, supporting a city proposition to establish minimum police staffing levels.
- 2022: Gave $70,000 to a super PAC to support Kirk Watson's 2022 run for Austin mayor against Celia Israel.
- 2022: Gave $25,000 to Margaret Gómez's campaign against Susanna Ledesma-Woody for the Commissioners Court in Travis County.
- 2022: Gave $25,000 to Greg Abbott in his campaign for governor against Beto O'Rourke.
- 2022: The Liemandts were the top contributor for ActBlue Texas PAC in the 2022 election cycle, with $125,000 donated.
- 2024: Gave $20,000 to Jeremy Sylestine's campaign against José Garza for Travis County district attorney.
- 2024: Gave $50,000 to Ellen Troxclair during the Republican primary race against Kyle Biedermann for Texas's 19th House of Representatives district.
