= S. Sunil =

Indian screenwriter

- Born: Kerala, India
- Occupations: Filmmaker, theatre director, screenwriter, academic
- Notable work: Kaliyorukkam; Marubhagham; Vishudha Rathrikal
- Awards: 2008 Kerala State Film Award for Best Children's Film; 2015 SiGNS Special Mention Award

S. Sunil is an Indian filmmaker, theatre director, screenwriter and an academic, who works in Malayalam cinema and theatre. He is known for such films as Kaliyorukkam, Marubhagham and Vishudha Rathrikal as well as theatre productions like Kandamrugam, a drama based on Eugène Ionesco's Rhinoceros. He is a recipient of the 2008 Kerala State Film Award for Best Children's Film.

== Career ==
Sunil debuted as a filmmaker with a children's film, Kaliyorukkam (Groundwork) in 2007 and the film received the Kerala State Film Award for Best Children's Film. This was followed by Marubhagham (The Other Side), based on a poem by Nicanor Parra, in 2015 and it won the Special Mention Award at the 10th SiGNS film festival. The film was also screened as a part of a specially curated film package at the 2016 Kochi-Muziris Biennale. The third film was Vishudha Rathrikal (Moral Nights) in 2021, an anthology film comprising five stories, featuring Santhosh Keezhattoor, Alencier Ley Lopez and Anil Nedumangad among others.

Sunil served as an assistant professor at School of Drama and Fine Arts, Thrissur and held the position of the Dean of the Faculty of Fine Arts at the University of Calicut till 2022. He is also a member of the directorate of the International Theatre Festival of Kerala, organized by the Kerala Sangeetha Nataka Akademi.

== Filmography ==
Year	Title	Capacity
2007	Kaliyorukkam	Director
2015	Marubhagham	Director/screenwriter
2020	Visudha Rathrikal	Director/screenwriter

== Allegation of rape ==
In 2022, Sunil S. was accused of rape by a student. Following the filing of the formal complaint, the university suspended him from his teaching position to facilitate an impartial investigation.

== See also ==
- Sudhi Anna
