= NWEA =

Nonprofit organization in Portland, Oregon

NWEA (NORTH WEST EVALUATION ASSOCIATION)
- Industry: Standardized testing
- Founded: 1977
- Headquarters: Portland, Oregon, U.S.
- Website: nwea.org

The Northwest Evaluation Association (NWEA) is a division of Houghton Mifflin Harcourt (HMH) (acquired by HMH in 2023) that creates academic assessments for students pre-K through grade 12. It was founded in 1977 in Beaverton, Oregon. NWEA was a 501(c)(3) non-profit organization as of its fiscal year ended June 2022 (filed in May 2023).

NWEA assessments are used by over 50,000 schools and districts in 149 countries. There are over 16.2 million students using NWEA. Its primary assessment product is the MAP Suite, a collection of formative and interim assessments that help teachers identify student learning needs, track skill mastery, and measure academic growth. Test subjects are math, reading, language, and science.

In January 2023, it was announced that Houghton Mifflin Harcourt had acquired NWEA and would operate as a division of HMH. This was finalized on May 1, 2023.
