= Microschool =

Reinvention of the one-room school house

Microschooling is the reinvention of the one-room schoolhouse, where class size is typically smaller than that in most schools.

== Historical antecedents ==
Microschooling has been described as a modern incarnation of the one-room schoolhouse. In the United States, approximately 150,000 single-teacher schools operated in the early 1930s, but fewer than 400 operated as of 2005; school sizes became larger throughout the 20th century, driven by increased urbanization, the popularization of the school bus, and education professionalization and standardization.

== 21st-century United States ==
In the 21st-century United States, microschools are very small forms of private schools; they are often registered with the state as homeschooling operations. U.S. microschools typically enroll fewer students than in a single traditional-school classroom. Enrollment varies from a handful to several dozen. Many emerge from collectives of homeschooling families that pool resources to hire a teacher. Some microschools emphasize different topics or approaches, such as project-based learning, the arts, or the Socratic method. About two-thirds of U.S. microschools are operated by licensed or formerly licensed schoolteachers. Some microschools are Christian, while others are secular. Some microschools meet in homes, churches, or storefronts.

The National Microschooling Center is an advocacy group for the movement; it estimated that as of the 2023–24 school year there were 95,000 microschools and homeschooling "pods" in the U.S. nationwide, with more than one million students participating. A survey by the group found that 40% percent of microschool students were previously enrolled in public school, while another third were previously homeschooled. The popularity of microschools increased sharply in the 2020s for several reasons, including disruptions associated with the COVID-19 pandemic, more government funding through school choices initiatives, and the increasing popularity of education savings accounts. As of 2023, about one-third of microschools received public funding as part of school voucher-type programs.

Many microschools are unregulated; in some states, curricula is not overseen, facilities are not inspected, and staff background checks are optional. However, some microschools operate four or five days each week, have full-time teachers and formal curricula, and use standardized tests. Because microschools are often considered homeschools, most microschools do not require accreditation. However, some microschools have sought and received accreditation as private schools. In a National Microschooling Center survey of 400 microschools, shared with the newspaper The Hill in 2024, 16% of microschools reported that they were accredited. A few microschools have grown large enough to no longer be considered "micro."

A 2014 NPR article cited Brightworks of San Francisco, the Brooklyn Apple Academy and Austin, Texas's Acton Academy as examples of microschools. The now-closed startups AltSchool and CottageClass supported microschools. Prenda is a VC-backed company that has helped more than a thousand people start their own microschools.

Microschool tuition can vary widely. Some, like The Beekman School in Manhattan, which has classes of six or seven students and has been called a microschool, charge tuition of $50,000 or more. However, the recent expansion of microschools has seen lower-cost offerings, with tuition as low as $6,200.

Some microschools have emerged from more traditional schools. For example, in 2024, the Purdue Polytechnic High School Lab School established a microschool in Indianapolis for 20 of its high school students who were identified as students who could benefit from a personalized curriculum and greater social-emotional resources.

== Outside the United States ==
In 2007, a UK Conservative Party task force headed by Iain Duncan Smith recommended that the party propose "Pioneer schools" (jointly led by parents and charities) as a policy.

== Comparison With Homeschooling ==
Microschooling and homeschooling are often grouped together, but they’re actually quite different. Whereas in homeschooling, parents are primarily responsible for the child’s education, in microschooling, a teacher, tutor, parent collective or other education provider might fill this role. Microschooled children may benefit from more socialization than homeschooled children and parents don’t have to teach every subject, though tuition can be substantial.

== See also ==
- Small schools movement
- Class size
