= Jofin T. Chacko =

Malayalam filmmaker

- Born: Mundur, Palakkad
- Occupation: Film Director
- Years active: 2021-present
- Known for: The Priest (2021); Rekhachithram (2025)

Jofin T. Chacko is an Indian film director working in the Malayalam film industry. He has directed The Priest (2021) and Rekhachithram (2025).

== Career ==
In 2021, he directed his debut, Priest. It stars Mammootty and Nikhila Vimal in titular roles. In 2025, he directed his second movie Rekhachithram starring Asif Ali, Anaswara Rajan, and Manoj K Jayan.

== Filmography ==
Year	Title
2021	The Priest
2025	Rekhachithram
