= The Priest (2021 film) =

2021 film by Jofin T. Chacko

- Theatrical release poster
- Directed by: Jofin T. Chacko
- Screenplay by: Shyam Menon; Deepu Pradeep
- Story by: Jofin T. Chacko
- Based on: Father Brown by Rachel Flowerday and Tahsin Güner; The Prodigy by Jeff Buhler
- Produced by: Anto Joseph; B. Unnikrishnan; V. N. Babu
- Starring: Mammootty; Nikhila Vimal
- Cinematography: Akhil George
- Edited by: Shameer Muhammed
- Music by: Rahul Raj
- Production companies: Anto Joseph Film Company; RD Illuminations
- Distributed by: Anto Joseph Film Company; Truth Global Films (GCC)
- Release date: 11 March 2021 (India)
- Running time: 147 minutes
- Country: India
- Language: Malayalam

The Priest is a 2021 Indian Malayalam-language supernatural horror mystery film directed by debutant Jofin T. Chacko. The film stars Mammootty, Nikhila Vimal and Baby Monica. Manju Warrier appears in an extended cameo role in the second half of the film. Produced jointly by B. Unnikrishnan and Anto Joseph, the film features original score and soundtrack composed and produced by Rahul Raj. The film is itself inspired the basic threads of the story of the English TV series Father Brown and the 2019 released American horror thriller film, The Prodigy.

The film was scheduled to release on 31 July 2020 on the occasion of Eid al-Adha, but production was delayed due to the COVID-19 pandemic in India. The film released on 11 March 2021 to generally mixed reviews but was a commercial success.

== Plot ==
Fr. Carmen Benedict, a parapsychologist is asked by a girl, Diya Alex, to investigate a string of suicides in a wealthy family named the Alatt family. Elizabeth Alatt is the only surviving member; Fr. Benedict and a police officer DYSP Shekhar fix an appointment to meet her the next day to inquire about the mysterious suicides. However, she commits suicide that night. The only person with Elizabeth was Ameya Gabriel, a 11-year old orphan girl whom she picked up in Chennai. Ameya is a quiet, morose girl, who ran away from the orphanage. Ameya is sent back to the orphanage where an attempt on her life the same night warns Fr. Benedict and the police of a grave conspiracy, implying that she had seen Elizabeth's killer.

Fr. Benedict hires some local workers to search the Alatt house. A strip of potent psychiatric pills is found; the pills could be prescribed only by a registered medical practitioner. Further investigation reveals that Elizabeth was under the treatment of Dr. Sanjay as were all the other Alatt family members who committed suicide. Upon questioning, Dr. Sanjay admits to brainwashing Elizabeth to commit suicide and names two other accomplices. The case unfolds that all three of them were members of the Alatt Trust and conspired to kill the family to gain control of the Alatt family business, money and power. They confess their crime and are sentenced to jail.

It is then revealed that Diya had already died and it was her ghost that communicated with Fr. Benedict while she was invisible to others. Though the Alatt family murders are solved, Fr. Benedict finds a mysterious aura around Ameya, who remained tight-lipped about Elizabeth's murder and never cooperated with the police. Ameya always remained gloomy, sad, unhappy and foul-tempered until a new maths teacher, Jessy Cherian, joins the school. Jessy takes Ameya under her wing and steadily her grades and behaviour improve. Both of them creates a bond and liking to each other.

Summer vacations arrive, Ameya coaxes Jessy to get permission from the orphanage to allow her to spend 2-months of vacation with Jessy. Time passes in bliss for a few weeks until Siddharth, Jessy's fiancé, enters the story. Ameya's demeanour changes on seeing Siddharth; she storms away, breaks glass with her hand and eerily hounds Jessy while stating they do not need anyone else in their lives. Scared, Jessy contacts Fr. Benedict who states that Ameya is possessed by the soul of Elizabeth and she can only be saved by exorcism.

However, during the exorcism, Fr. Benedict realises that Ameya wasn't possessed by Elizabeth's soul but it was Jessy's elder sister Susan's soul, who died during an accident around 11 years ago. Through flashback scenes, it is revealed that Susan and Jessy lost their parents when Jessy was a little girl. Susan raises Jessy, and becomes a sports teacher in the school where Jessy and Siddharth studied.

One day, Jessy sneaks out of the home to attend a party with Siddharth and their common friends. Both get drunk and while driving back, they hit a scooter being ridden by Susan, who was searching for Jessy. It is revealed that Susan's soul possessed Ameya at birth to seek revenge from Siddharth for causing her death and separating her from Jessy. However, Fr. Benedict reveals to Susan that it was Jessy who was driving that fateful night and she had unknowingly caused the accident in a drunken state. Siddharth was actually trying to protect Jessy, who was still unaware of the reality, from the consequences. Susan's soul leaves Ameya's body after learning the truth and bidding a tearful and emotional goodbye to Jessy.

The story ends with a twist. Flashback scenes reveal that when Susan was taken to the hospital after the accident, she could have been saved. But, the doctor, Dr. Muralidharan chose to end her life to protect his friend, a sports teacher who was caught by Susan for administering steroids to students. Fr. Benedict helped Susan's soul to exact revenge on the duo - seeing her ghost, their car swerved and had an accident, resulting their death. The movie ends with Fr. Benedict saying, "now Susan, you can rest in peace".

== Cast ==
- Mammootty as Fr. Carmen Benedict
- Nikhila Vimal as Jessy Cherian
  - Natania Mithin as Young Jessy
- Manju Warrier as Susan Cherian (extended cameo)
  - Arya K Vivek as Young Susan (Cameo)
- Baby Monica as Ameya Gabriel
- Venkitesh V. P. as Siddharth (Sidhu)
- Saniya Iyappan as Diya Alex Alatt
- Sivadas Kannur as DYSP Shekhar Balan
- Sindhu Varma as Mother Superior
- Jagadish as Adv. Sadasivam K A
- Ramesh Pisharody as Dr. Sanjay
- T. G. Ravi as Dr. Mathews
- Shivaji Guruvayoor as Chacko, School Principal
- Lishoy as Alex Alatt
- Jeeva Joseph as Anand Subramaniam
- Madhupal as Dr. Muralidharan
- Manoj Chennai as Sudarshan
- Kochu Preman as Peon Paul
- Sohan Seenulal as Sabu
- Meera Nair as Elizabeth Alatt
- Nitha Promy as Lisy Alex Alatt
- Sminu Sijo as Sheela
- Jitin Puthenchery as Manu
- V. K. Prakash as Surendran, Manu's Father
- Kalabhavan Haneef as Ganeshan, Anand's Father
- Dinesh Panicker as Francis John
- Tony as Sub Inspector Antony
- Arjun Nandhakumar as DIG Raheem Razak IPS, Commissioner of Police
- Naseer Sankranthi as Orphanage Cook
- Shiny T. Rajan as Teacher
- Ameya Mathew as Annie
- Thomas Kuriakose as Sports School Director
- Rajan P Dev as Joseph Alatt (photo appearance)
- Jayadevan as Security

=== Family Tree of Alatt family ===
Joseph Alatt
Alex Alatt	Lisy Alex Alatt	Joshi Alatt	Elizabeth Joshi Alatt
Diya Alex Alatt

== Production ==
The principal photography commenced in January 2020 and had to put the filming into a temporary halt due to the COVID-19 pandemic. The last schedule was resumed in the first week of October and the team has completed filming the entire film in the first week of November.

On 12 January 2020, the first look poster shared on social media revealed that Mammootty plays a priest in the film and showed his character in a habit with his hood on and perusing what seems to be the Bible against the backdrop of a church.

== Release ==
=== Theatrical ===
The film was originally scheduled to release in August 2020, but the premiere was postponed due to the COVID-19 pandemic. The release date was then projected to be on 4 February 2021, and was delayed again. The film was set to release on 4 March 2021. And on 2 March 2021, film was again postponed indefinitely as the team couldn't get approval from the Government of Kerala for night shows. The film was theatrically released on 11 March 2021 after the government gave permission for second shows in theatres. The Priest was the biggest Malayalam release after COVID-19 outbreak and released over 300 screens (50% occupancy) across the Kerala state.

=== Home media ===
The film streams on Amazon Prime.

== Reception ==
=== Box office ===
The Priest collected ₹ 1.6 crore in Kerala in its opening day. The film collected A$100,250 (₹56.07 lakhs) from Australia box office and became Industry hit. The film collected over ₹20 crore from Kerala box office with 16 crore of share and also became the first Malayalam film to gross over ₹1 crore in Saudi Arabia on first day. The film was a commercial success and became the highest grossing Malayalam film from Singapore box office. The film collected ₹35 crore in its final run at the box office. The film was the second highest-grossing Malayalam film of 2021, behind Kurup.

=== Critical response ===
Sify rated the film 4.5/5 and given the verdict for the film as An Engaging Thriller. It stated that "The Priest may not be perfect but manages to keep the viewers glued on to the screen for sure. Try this one!." International Business Times rated the film 3.5/5 and given the verdict for the film as A classic horror crime thriller. It stated that "Magical visuals, Mammootty's performance, and uncompromising cinematic language. The Priest is one of the best horror-crime thrillers ever made in Mollywood.". Behindwoods gave it a rating of 3.5 stars out of 5 and said, Mammootty Plays Sherlock Holmes in a Bad Script. Firstpost gave it a rating of 3.25 stars out of 5 and wrote, Some genuine scares here, but the effort to be cool is this Mammootty-starrer’s Achilles heel. The Indian Express gave it a rating of 3 stars out of 5 and wrote, Mammootty’s horror thriller fails to deliver on its promise.

== Music ==
The original songs and original film score were composed, arranged and produced by Rahul Raj. The lyrics for the three songs were penned by BK Harinarayanan. Nazarethin, the first single of the film was released on 24 January 2021.

=== Tracklist ===
Original songs
No.	Title	Singer(s)	Length
1.	"Nazarethin"	Baby Niya Charly, Merin Gregory	03:59
2.	"Neelambale"	Sujatha Mohan	03:55
3.	"Kanne Uyirin"	Narayani Gopan	04:33
