= Artemis (software) =

Family of planning and management tools

Artemis is the brand name of a family of software based project planning and management tools.

== Origins ==
Artemis originated as the Artemis Project Management System developed by Metier Management Systems in 1978, a sister product to Apollo, Metier's first PERT network scheduling system launched in 1977. Apollo and Artemis were the first large-scale project management systems available on mini-computers (as opposed to mainframes) and the world's first commercially successful relational database system.

Metier was founded in 1976 by Richard Evans, Robin Lodge, Roy W. Brown and James Miller who programmed the original single-user version of the software in a Suffolk attic in Debach. He went on to write the multi-user version of the software with Richard Nobbs and Alan Playford.

Artemis combined project planning and scheduling with cost control and resource management. The first products were sold as turn-key systems: both hardware (the Hewlett Packard 21 series) and software built into a desk. In the early 1980s Metier launched a software-only version of Artemis for IBM mainframes.

Artemis later evolved into three major product lines to support project planning and scheduling, earned value management (project performance measurement), portfolio management, resource management, and time reporting—Artemis 9000, Artemis Views and Artemis 7.

Artemis 9000 was originally a mainframe only product working on IBM or compatible hardware running MVS or VM. It was broadly similar to the previous mini computer based products known as Artemis 5000 and Artemis 6000. This language structure was known as A1. Today, Artemis 9000 runs on both Microsoft Windows and IBM OS/390 operating systems. The porting to the server environment was made possible by IBM's release of a PL1 compiler originally for their OS/2 operating system. This meant that the same source code could be recompiled on a PC running OS/2. Sales of the Artemis 9000 on OS/2 LAN began soon after the compiler was released, although sales were slow. When a compiler of Windows NT arrived, sales of 9000 in the server environment took off. One of its key features was that the data structures on mainframe were the same as those on the NT platform which meant migration between platforms was simple and reliable. It was possible for a user to go home on a Friday having used a mainframe version and log on to a LAN version a Monday without noticing the difference. Additional functionality was introduced which meant that both NT and mainframe versions of the product could act as web servers communicating with web based user interfaces. Artemis 9000 is still in use in 2013. Artemis 9000 page on AISC website

In the early eighties, Metier began a project called "Artemis 2" which was to build a dedicated database machine and a new ground-up version of the project management system. The project was led by Gordon Thompson, with Alan Playford as CTO. The project grew in size to a staff of about 250 people and an army of VAX computers. The team were probably the only group in the UK to re-microcode a VAX-11/750 to emulate a different machine (i.e. the one under development). New premises were purchased to house the software, hardware, and firmware groups. The scope of the project also grew with a desire to port the new generation of the project management software to IBM mainframes, VAXes, Unix machines, and eventually even PCs. But following the sale Metier to Lockheed in 1985, the mainframe version of Artemis 2 never became a commercial reality, however, A2 as it became known, appeared on a variety of Unix machines and also on PC's and achieved commercial success. The Unix version of the product was known as Artemis 7000, while the PC version was known as Artemis 2000 (having been introduced as Personal Artemis).

The company introduced a variety of supporting products:

- Artemis Link was a fully fledged terminal emulator allowing PC's to be used with Artemis 5000/6000/9000
- Artemis Plot/Artemis Plot for Windows were pc based graphics tools which received files in Artemis's own Universal Plot File Format (UPFF), and allowed output to screen and any PC/LAN attached graphics printers/plotters
- Artemis Sync/Artemis Sync for Windows were the replacements Artemis Link. Rather than terminal emulators, they used the IBM defined EHLLAPI interface to allow Artemis 9000 to interact with the PC environment allowing file transfer and the use of Artemis Plot/Artemis Plot for Windows.
- Artemis LAN client began life as the client programme for 9000 for LAN, but was soon rolled out as a client programme for use with Artemis 9000 on mainframe rendering Artemis Link & Artemis Sync redundant
- Planning 9000 was multi user, enterprise project management solution written in the Artemis 9000 language. While it was a fully functional off the shelf product, it was usually heavily customised to provide an exact fit for each enterprises requirements
- Cost 9000 was a cost management solution written in the Artemis 9000 language. Being CSPEC compliant, it was mostly aimed at the US Defence market and like Planning 9000 was often heavily customised to fit each enterprises requirements

Metier was sold to Lockheed for US$130m at a time when the US$ and the £Sterling were close to parity. Since then, the company has been sold many times, each time for a considerably lesser amount, and with the company often renamed by the new owner.

== Artemis Views ==
Artemis Views had its origins in K&H's "Prestige" tool. In the 1990s, Artemis International purchased software vendor K&H and began marketing their Prestige tool as Artemis Views.

Artemis ran on a variety of Windows and Web based platforms using Oracle and Microsoft SQL Server databases.

Artemis Views was an integrated enterprise project management application that provides the capability to accomplish project planning and scheduling, resource allocation and tracking, time reporting, and earned value management.

Artemis ProjectView was a robust critical path method (CPM) scheduling system capable of handling large projects (over 20,000 individual activities) with the associated resource requirements and logical dependencies. Artemis CostView was full earned value management system and was compliant with government and industry EVM standards. CostView integrated with ProjectView to provide full cost and schedule integration. Artemis TrackView was an integrated time reporting system used to record, approve and report time charged against projects.

The last version of Artemis Views was Version 8.

== Artemis 7 ==
Artemis 7 is the newest addition to the Artemis's product line. Artemis 7 is an investment planning and control Web application. Designed to support senior and mid-level management financial investment and planning activities. Artemis 7 contains several major components—Investment Portfolio Management, Demand and Initiative Management, Financial Planning and Budgeting, and Program and Project Management, Resource Management, Work Management and Dashboards and Analytics.

The current version of Artemis 7 is Version 8.4.

While Artemis has provided project planning and management tools used by Global 500 companies since 1978, during the 1990s it encountered financial problems similar to many other high technology firms in the post dot.com bubble era.

In their 2006 Form 10-K filing Artemis International Solutions Corporation made the following comments:

"As disclosed in Note 1 to the financial statements, the Company has incurred substantial recurring losses from operations and may incur losses in the future. These and other factors as described in Note 1 raise substantial doubt about the Company’s ability to continue as a going concern without financial restructuring, absent an improvement in the Company’s operating performance."

Further on in the Form 10-K filing Artemis made the additional comments:

"We have experienced net losses in each of the three years in the period ended December 31, 2005. At December 31, 2005, we reported an accumulated deficit of approximately $96.7 million and our current liabilities exceeded current assets by approximately $5.6 million."

In July 2006, Artemis was purchased by Versata. In order to improve the financial standing of the company, Versata/Artemis pursued major worldwide organizational changes. The most notable changes were the consolidation of Artemis's product development in India and the reduction in Artemis' employee base worldwide to the extent that the majority of employees were made redundant in Europe and in the United States.

== Artemis's Redundancy Policy lawsuit ==
Under Versata ownership, Artemis pursued an aggressive redundancy policy towards its employees. Artemis had a longstanding enhanced redundancy payment policy. Versata judged the policy to be discretionary and disregarded it, sacking most employees and offering considerably less than the payments stipulated by the policy. A longstanding employee pursued legal action culminating in the case of Harlow V Artemis International Corporation, in which the UK High Court ruled that an enhanced redundancy payment was an express term of an employee's employment terms, and not merely discretionary, as claimed by Artemis.
