= Trilogy (company) =

American software company based in Austin, Texas

Trilogy, Inc.
- Type: Private
- Industry: Business Services
- Founded: 1989
- Headquarters: Austin, Texas, United States
- Key people: Joe Liemandt, President and CEO
- Website: trilogy.com

Trilogy is an American software company based in Austin, Texas. It specializes in software products to Global 1000 companies, especially in the automotive, consumer electronics, and insurance agencies. It was founded by Stanford dropout Joe Liemandt. Trilogy has additional offices in Bangalore and Hangzhou.

Trilogy was featured in the October 1998 Rolling Stone article "Wooing the Geeks". Trilogy is notable for its Trilogy University program, which was the topic of the April 2001 Harvard Business Review article "No Ordinary Boot Camp."

== Subsidiaries ==
In February 2006, Trilogy acquired Versata.

In July 2006, Trilogy acquired Artemis International Solutions Corporation, a supplier of project and product portfolio management tools, including Artemis (software). Versata operates as a wholly owned subsidiary of Trilogy, Inc.

In October 2012, Trilogy acquired four Progress Software businesses – Sonic, Savvion, Actional and DXSI - and created a new company called Aurea Software.

Trilogy Insurance is a wholly owned subsidiary of Trilogy.
