= Covered business method patent =

A covered business method (CBM) patent is defined in section 18 of the America Invents Act (AIA) as a patent that "claims a method or corresponding apparatus for performing data processing or other operations used in the practice, administration, or management of a financial product or service," but is not for a "technological" invention. The AIA statute provides for CBM review of CBM patents. This review is an administrative proceeding to determine the validity of the patent under review. Congress created CBM review because of a concern with "litigation abuse over business method patents."

A CBM patent is defined further by regulations that the statute directed the United States Patent and Trademark Office (USPTO or PTO) to promulgate. Under these regulations, a CBM patent is one relating to monetary matters, and a technological invention is one in which “the claimed subject matter as a whole recites a technological feature that is novel and unobvious over the prior art; and solves a technical problem using a technical solution.”

The USPTO has published a Trial Practice Guide explaining CBM procedures and amplifying its regulations on what is not a technological invention:

a) Mere recitation of known technologies, such as computer hardware, communication or computer networks, software, memory, computer-readable storage medium, scanners, display devices or databases, or specialized machines, such as an ATM or point of sale device.
b) Reciting the use of known prior art technology to accomplish a process or method, even if that process or method is novel and non-obvious.
c) Combining prior art structures to achieve the normal, expected, or predictable result of that combination.

CBM proceedings are tried before the Patent Trial and Appeal Board (PTAB), a newly created adjudicatory arm of the PTO. The standard for whether the PTAB will institute a CBM proceeding is whether a petition by an interested party (ordinarily, a party that the patentee sued for patent infringement) requesting institution of the proceeding establishes that it is more likely than not that at least one claim of the challenged patent is unpatentable. Although the issue was hotly contested for a time, it is now established that any statutory ground of invalidity may be considered, including patent ineligibility under 35 U.S.C. § 101.
