= Sun Singer =

Indian television series

- Sun Singer Grand Finale
- Country of origin: India
- Original language: Tamil

Production
- Production locations: Tamil Nadu, India
- Running time: 1 hour

Original release
- Network: Sun TV
- Release: 27 January 2013 – 22 March 2020

Sun Singer is a premier reality TV Indian singing competition in the Tamil language that is being broadcast on Sun TV. Season 1 to 5, It is a singing talent hunt for children of age group 6 to 13 years old in Tamil Nadu. Season 6, It is a singing talent hunt for children of age group 14 to 60 years old in Tamil Nadu The show has had over six successful seasons so far.

According to Sun TV's website, the show is a reinvented version of its Indian singing competition and mega reality TV show, Sapthaswarangal. Sapthaswarangal was hugely successful, with the show being renewed for multiple seasons, telecast for over a decade on Sun TV, and introducing multiple playback singers including Chinmayi, Karthik, Mahathi, Ranjith, and Vinaya Karthik Rajan.

The show airs weekly on Sundays at 1:00 pm on Sun TV.

== Season 1 ==
Sun Singer
- Season 1
- Presented by: Manasi

Release
- Original network: Sun TV
- Original release: 27 January – 4 August 2013

Season 1 of the show was sponsored by Cadbury Oreo, and co-sponsored by VCare, GRB Udhayam Ghee, and Premier Cookware & Appliances. Season 1 was hosted by singer Manasi, while singers Anuradha Sriram and Pushpavanam Kuppuswamy appeared as permanent judges for the season. Lyricist and music director Gangai Amaran appeared as the show's permanent voice trainer. The winner up was secured by AC Gaayathri

== Season 2 ==
Sun Singer
- Season 2
- Presented by: various

Release
- Original network: Sun TV
- Original release: 11 August 2013 – 2 March 2014

Season 2 of the show was sponsored by Pudhiya ("New") Cadbury Oreo Strawberry Cream, and co-sponsored by VCare, Jayachandran Textiles, and Premier Cookware & Appliances. Each portion of season 2 was hosted by a different personality, beginning with actress Nisha Krishnan, followed b y television anchor Reshma Pasupuleti, followed by lyricist and music director Gangai Amaran, and finally followed by singer Kamalaja Rajagopal. Playback singers Anuradha Sriram and Pushpavanam Kuppuswamy returned as permanent judges for the season, while Gangai Amaran returned as the show's permanent voice trainer. The top contestants were Aishwarya, Ishwarya, Poojaa Sree, Akhilesh, Abhinaya, Akshara Shritharan, Dhenuka, Manoj Krishna, Maalavika, Krithika, Krishnakanth, Harshitha, Nithya sri, Harini, Ishwarya, Kavya, Megha, Prarthana, Sneha, Sanjana and Vrusha.

== Season 3 ==
Sun Singer
- Season 3
- Presented by: Aishwarya Prabhakar (episodes 19 to 42)

Release
- Original network: Sun TV
- Original release: 9 March 2014 – 4 January 2015

Season 3 of the show was sponsored by Pudhiya ("New") Cadbury Oreo Strawberry Cream, and co-sponsored by VCare, Jayachandran Textiles, and Premier Cookware & Appliances. The second half of the season was hosted by Aishwarya Prabhakar, while Anuradha Sriram, Pushpavanam Kuppuswamy, and Gangai Amaran retained as permanent judges for the season.

The winner of the season was set to win a series of prizes from sponsors of the show, and would receive a trophy as title winner. Nine of the final contestants were selected to perform in the finals and compete in the grand finale, part 1 of which was telecast on 28 December 2014. The results of the competition were announced in the second portion telecast on 4 January 2015 by the chief guest at the finale, music director G. V. Prakash Kumar.

Contestant Shreya Jaydeep was announced as the winner of season 3 in the second portion of the grand finale telecast on 4 January 2015. Contestant Sandra was crowned runner-up of season 3, and contestant Swetha Sri was crowned best entertainer of the season.

== Season 4 ==
Sun Singer
- Season 4
- Presented by: Nakshathra & Muthu

Release
- Original network: Sun TV
- Original release: 11 January 2015 – 24 January 2016

The show airs on Sundays at 11:00 am on Sun TV, and is hosted by Nakshathra & Muthu.

Season 4 of the show is sponsored by Cadbury Oreo, and co-sponsored by VCare, GRB Udhayam Ghee, and Vasanth & Co.

=== Show format ===
==== Open auditions ====
The open auditions are conducted in various cities in Tamil Nadu and are the first stage in determining the finalists of each season. During this stage, contestants sing a song or two before a panel of preliminary audition judges. The panel then decides on-the-spot whether the contestant demonstrated enough ability and performance value to proceed further. If the contestant exhibited exceptional ability in their performance, judges "select" the contestant to move instantly one step forward in the competition. Alternatively, if judges are on the fence about the singer, they will place the contestant on a waitlist until the end of that day's auditions. Otherwise, if the contestant lacks the ability and performance value to proceed further, the contestant will be rejected.

Participating contestants are given chocolate or chocolate biscuits to encourage them to perform.

==== Final level auditions ====
The final auditions are conducted to select the finalists of each season from the contestants who were selected during open auditions. During this stage, contestants sing a song or two before a panel of final level audition judges. Again, the panel decides on-the-spot whether the contestant demonstrated enough ability and performance value to proceed further. If the contestant exhibited exceptional ability in their performance, judges "select" the contestant to move instantly one step forward in the competition. Alternatively, if judges are on the fence about the singer, they will place the contestant on a waitlist until the end of that day's auditions. Otherwise, if the contestant lacks the ability and performance value to proceed further, the contestant will be rejected.

Participating contestants are again given chocolate biscuits to encourage them to perform.

=== Auditions ===
Open auditions were held across Tamil Nadu.

No.	Title	Audition Judges	Original release date
1	"Coimbatore Auditions – part 1"	Vinaya Karthik Rajan, Ramya NSK, Suchithra Karthik Kumar, & Rahul Nambiar	11 January 2015
Auditions which were held in Coimbatore before a panel of four judges.
2	"Coimbatore Auditions – part 2"	Vinaya Karthik Rajan, Ramya NSK, Suchithra Karthik Kumar, & Rahul Nambiar	18 January 2015
More auditions which were held in Coimbatore before a panel of four judges.
3	"Trichy Auditions – part 1"	Level 1 auditions: Vinaya Karthik Rajan & Ramya NSK; Level 2 auditions: Suchithra Karthik Kumar & Krish	25 January 2015
Auditions which were held in Trichy on 4 January 2015, over two levels. Contestants who were selected in the first level by the first pair of judges proceeded to audition in the second level for the second pair of judges.
4	"Trichy Auditions – part 2"	Level 1 auditions: Vinaya Karthik Rajan & Ramya NSK; Level 2 auditions: Suchithra Karthik Kumar & Krish	1 February 2015
More auditions which were held in Trichy on 4 January 2015, over two levels. Contestants who were selected in the first level by the first pair of judges proceeded to audition in the second level for the second pair of judges.
5	"Madurai Auditions – part 1"	Vinaya Karthik Rajan, Krish, Suchithra Karthik Kumar, & Ramya NSK	8 February 2015
Auditions which were held in Madurai before a panel of four judges.
6	"Madurai Auditions – part 2"	Vinaya Karthik Rajan, Krish, Suchithra Karthik Kumar, & Ramya NSK	15 February 2015
More auditions which were held in Madurai before a panel of four judges.
7	"Chennai Auditions – part 1"	Ranjith, Vinaya Karthik Rajan, Krish, & Ramya NSK	22 February 2015
Auditions which were held in Chennai on 15 February 2015, before a panel of four judges.
8	"Chennai Auditions – part 2"	Ranjith, Vinaya Karthik Rajan, Krish, & Ramya NSK	1 March 2015
More auditions which were held in Chennai on 15 February 2015, before a panel of four judges.
9	"Chennai Auditions – part 3"	Vinaya Karthik Rajan, Ranjith, Suchithra Karthik Kumar, Krish, & Ramya NSK	8 March 2015
Auditions which were held in Chennai on 15 February 2015, this time before a panel of five judges.
10	"Chennai Auditions – part 4"	Vinaya Karthik Rajan, Ranjith, Suchithra Karthik Kumar, Krish, & Ramya NSK	15 March 2015
More auditions which were held in Chennai on 15 February 2015, before the panel of five judges.
11	"Preliminary level studio auditions – part 1"	Krish, permanent judge Anuradha Sriram, & permanent voice trainer Gangai Amaran	22 March 2015
Auditions at the newly designed grand studio set at which the main competition would take place. Prior to the commencement of the final level auditions, the judges were each asked to comment on the difference between Sun Singer and other music competition reality shows telecast on other Tamil language TV channels. Gangai Amaran asserted that world-wide Tamil viewers know that children contestants appearing on other channels are proud, while children contestants on this show are not proud but remain as children. Anuradha Sriram asserted that rather than focusing on TRPs, her opinion is this show is genuinely run for the benefit of children. Krish asserted that Sun TV is synonymous with grand, and the fact that the show is telecast on Sun TV confirms that it is actually grand. The first performance in episode 11 was by Gangai Amaran, who would also be the voice trainer for the show. and the first contestant performance was by Pranathi, a child-actress in Aruvi who was selected as a finalist of the competition. All participants were gifted Cadbury Oreo biscuit packets at the end of their performances. Selected finalists were also given a Radel electronic tanpura or electronic shruthi box.
12	"Preliminary level studio auditions – part 2"	Krish, permanent judge Anuradha Sriram, & permanent voice trainer Gangai Amaran	29 March 2015
More auditions at the newly designed grand studio set at which the main competition would take place. All participants were gifted Cadbury Oreo biscuit packets at the end of their performances. Selected finalists were also given a Radel electronic tanpura or electronic shruthi box.
13	"Preliminary level studio auditions – part 3"	Krish, permanent judge Anuradha Sriram, & permanent voice trainer Gangai Amaran	5 April 2015
More auditions at the newly designed grand studio set at which the main competition would take place. All participants were gifted Cadbury Oreo biscuit packets at the end of their performances. Selected finalists were also given a Radel electronic tanpura or electronic shruthi box.
14	"Preliminary level studio auditions – part 4"	Krish, permanent judge Anuradha Sriram, & permanent voice trainer Gangai Amaran	12 April 2015
More auditions at the newly designed grand studio set at which the main competition would take place. All participants were gifted Cadbury Oreo biscuit packets at the end of their performances. Selected finalists were also given a Radel electronic tanpura or electronic shruthi box.
15	"Preliminary level studio auditions – part 5"	Krish, permanent judge Anuradha Sriram, & permanent voice trainer Gangai Amaran	19 April 2015
More auditions at the newly designed grand studio set at which the main competition would take place. All participants were gifted Cadbury Oreo biscuit packets at the end of their performances. Selected finalists were also given a Radel electronic tanpura or electronic shruthi box.
16	"Final level studio auditions – part 1"	Krish, permanent judge Anuradha Sriram, & permanent voice trainer Gangai Amaran	26 April 2015
Participants selected during preliminary level auditions at the studio set were divided into groups and required to perform a full song. This week's episode featured one group of participants. At the conclusion of the episode, the judges announced names of 6 participants who would form the top 24 contestants for the main competition performance rounds. The remaining participants were eliminated but encouraged to audition in next year's auditions.
17	"Final level studio auditions – part 2"	Krish, permanent judge Anuradha Sriram, & permanent voice trainer Gangai Amaran	3 May 2015
Participants selected during preliminary level auditions at the studio set were divided into groups and required to perform a full song. This week's episode featured one group of participants. At the conclusion of the episode, the judges announced names of another 6 participants who would form the top 24 contestants for the main competition performance rounds. The remaining participants were eliminated but encouraged to audition in next year's auditions.
18	"Final level studio auditions – part 3"	Krish, permanent judge Anuradha Sriram, & permanent voice trainer Gangai Amaran	10 May 2015
Participants selected during preliminary level auditions at the studio set were divided into groups and required to perform a full song. This week's episode featured one group of participants. At the conclusion of the episode, the judges announced names of another 6 participants who would form the top 24 contestants for the main competition performance rounds. The remaining participants were eliminated but encouraged to audition in next year's auditions.
19	"Final level studio auditions – part 4"	Krish, permanent judge Anuradha Sriram, & permanent voice trainer Gangai Amaran	17 May 2015
Participants selected during preliminary level auditions at the studio set were divided into groups and required to perform a full song. This week's episode featured one group of participants. At the conclusion of the episode, the judges announced names of 6 more participants who would form the top 24 contestants for the main competition performance rounds. The remaining participants were eliminated but encouraged to audition in next year's auditions.

=== Live Grand Finale (10 January 2016) ===
- Hosts: Nakshathra & Muthu
- Celebrity Guests, Performers, and Judges: Vijay Antony, Sri Divya, Ramki, Khushbu, Leon James, Andrea Jeremiah, Ranjith, Suchithra, Remya Nambeesan, Siddharth, Hiphop Tamizha, Shrutika, Devi Sri Prasad, Nirosha, G. V. Prakash, Sangeetha Krish, Krish, Anuradha Sriram, and Gangai AmaranGrand Final Results (Season 4)

Name	Position	Prize
Praniti	Title Winner	
Bavin vinod	First Runner-up	
Parvathy	Second Runner-up	
Visnumaya	Fourth Runner-up	
Ritika	Fifth Runner-up	

== Season 5 ==
Sun Singer
- Season 5
- Presented by: Nakshathra & Dhilip

Release
- Original network: Sun TV The grand finale was held on 12 February 2017.

=== Grand Finale (12 February 2017) ===
- Hosts: Nakshathra & Dhilip Rayan & Muthu
- Celebrity Guests, Performers, and Judges: Prabhu Deva, Santhosh Narayanan, Shankar–Ganesh, Sundar C, Kovai Sarala, Vijay Antony, P. Unnikrishnan, Shruti Haasan, Raghava Lawrence, Arunraja Kamaraj, Mahathi, Nithyasree Mahadevan, A. R. Reihana, Yuvan Shankar Raja, Sanghavi, Uthara Unnikrishnan, Shanthanu Bhagyaraj, Bharath, Lakshmi Menon, Arun Vijay, Ramya NSK, Vinaya Karthik Rajan, Sanchita Shetty, Krish, Anuradha Sriram, and Gangai Amaran

==== Grand Final Results (Season 5) ====
Name	Position	Prize
Praniti	Title Winner	
Bavin vinod	First Runner-up	
Raktash	Second Runner-up	
Parvathy.TP	Fourth Position	
Visnumaya Ramesh	Fifth Position	
Ritika	Sixth Position	
