= Eleven (film) =

Indian Tamil-Telugu bilingual thriller film

- Theatrical release poster
- Directed by: Lokkesh Ajls
- Written by: Lokkesh Ajls
- Produced by: Ajmal Khan; Reyaa Hari; Prabhu Solomon (Creative Producer)
- Starring: Naveen Chandra; Reyaa Hari; Abhirami
- Cinematography: Karthik Ashokan
- Edited by: N. B. Srikanth
- Music by: D. Imman
- Production company: AR Entertainment
- Distributed by: Ruchira Entertainments
- Release date: 16 May 2025
- Running time: 135 minutes
- Country: India
- Languages: Tamil; Telugu

Eleven is a 2025 Indian slasher film written and directed by Lokkesh Ajls. The film was shot simultaneously in Tamil and Telugu. It stars Naveen Chandra, alongside Reyaa Hari, Abhirami, Ravi Varma, Dileepan, Riythvika, Shashank, Aadukalam Naren and Arjai in pivotal roles. The film has music composed by D. Imman, cinematography handled by Karthik Ashokan and editing by N. B. Srikanth.

Eleven was theatrically released on 16 May 2025, where it received positive reviews from critics and performed decently at the box office.

== Plot ==
The film begins with a serial killer setting ablaze a lifeless body on a desolate street. As the murders continue, the death toll reaches 6, and ACP Ranjith Kumar is initially assigned to the case. However, after Ranjith gets into a coma due to a road accident, the case is handed over to ACP Aravindan, a brilliant and resolute officer, who had recently apprehended a finance robbery team led by Dheeran. Aravindan, along with Sub-inspector Manoharan, a cardiac patient and a single father, starts investigating the serial killings. Meanwhile, Sanjana, who had mistakenly met Aravindan thinking he was her prospective groom, falls in love with him, but Aravindan doesn't reciprocate her feelings. Aravindan discovers a crucial piece of evidence, an ankle-surgery plate in one of the victims, which helps them shortlist 7 individuals based on age. One of the suspects is Sudhakar, who has a history of ankle surgery. Next, Aravindan meets Meera, the twin sister of one of the victims. Meera's connection to Twin Birds school, where a similar photograph is found in Sudhakar's house, hints at a deeper connection between the suspects and victims.

During the interrogation, Sudhakar and Meera reveal a shocking truth: they're Surendhar and Tara, who impersonated their identical twins, Sudhakar and Meera, respectively. They explain that their twins went missing, and they received a video call from a masked assailant who kidnapped them and forced them to kill a person with a covered face. The twins were threatened that if they refused to kill, their respective siblings would be killed. To save their siblings, they committed the murders. However, they later discovered that they had unknowingly killed their own twins, whose faces were covered during the act. To evade police investigation, Surendhar and Tara assumed the identities of Sudhakar and Meera. Aravindan learns that the only connection between the twins is their school, Twin Birds Matriculation School. Surendhar and Tara suspect that their classmate, Benjamin, might be behind the sinister plot, forcing them to commit fratricide.

Aravindan decides to meet the school's correspondent, Shanthi, to uncover more information about the twins' past and potential connections to Benjamin. Shanthi and her husband Ravi adopted twin brothers, Benjamin and Francis, impressed by Benjamin's chess talent. The brothers were raised at their school, Twin Birds Matriculation School. Benjamin turns into a chess prodigy, bringing laurels to school, and Francis becomes a topper in studies, which envies their fellow students. Tragedy struck when Francis, who suffered from nyctophobia, was mocked by his classmates and locked in a dark chemistry lab. This led to a fatal epileptic seizure. Benjamin, who was in the physics lab, couldn't rescue his brother. After Francis's death, Benjamin was cared for by Mother Helen and later adopted by an unknown family. Shanthi reveals that her husband kept Francis's death a secret to protect the school's reputation. However, the school was later destroyed in a fire, and Ravi died due to excessive drinking.

Aravindan obtains the records of the classmates and discovers that Benjamin is targeting twins on their birthdays. The remaining twins, Sanjana and Anjana, and Dheeran and Dheeraj are potential targets. Aravindan takes immediate action to safeguard Sanjana and Anjana, especially since Dheeran and Dheeraj are unreachable. Sanjana, who has feelings for Aravindan, is unaware of the danger looming over her. The investigation takes a turn when Aravindan discovers the charred corpse of Dheeran. Meanwhile, Ranjith Kumar, who was initially investigating the case, reveals that his coma was due to a preplanned murder attempt. He also reveals that the killer rescued him and placed him near the hospital. Aravindan learns from Shanthi that Benjamin visits Francis's cemetery every year on the latter's death anniversary. Aravindan rushes to the cemetery and discovers that Manohar is Benjamin in disguise. After an intense chase, Aravindan loses Benjamin and rushes to protect Anjana and Sanjana, but gets beaten by Manohar. When Aravindan wakes up, he finds that Benjamin has kidnapped Anjana. A fight ensues, and Aravindan hands over his gun to Sanjana to stop Benjamin from killing Anjana.

However, Sanjana ends up shooting her twin sister, Anjana, believing Aravindan's instructions. The truth is revealed that Aravindan is the real Benjamin, who has been planning his revenge against his classmates responsible for Francis's death. Benjamin surrenders to Ranjith Kumar, who recognizes him as the killer using his lighter box. Benjamin confesses to Ranjith Kumar that he had pursued an IPS career to avenge his brother Francis's death by killing the 10 twins who were responsible. He also reveals that he planned the road accident to distract Ranjith and to take over the case, and had also threatened to kill Manohar's son and made him act as Benjamin to protect himself while killing Anjana. Benjamin, aka Aravindan, is sentenced to death for his crimes. Soon, Ranjith is shocked to learn that Benjamin had cleverly burnt an unknown corpse and claimed it as Dheeran, and also voluntarily revealed him as the killer to Ranjith, so that he gets closer to Dheeran, whom he had arrested in the finance robbery case without knowing Dheeran's true identity. Before Ranjith Kumar and Manohar can safeguard Dheeran, Benjamin kills him in prison, fulfilling his revenge. In a shocking twist, Benjamin takes brain-dead pills and dies, but not before donating his heart to Manohar. Manohar fulfills Benjamin's last wish by burying him near Francis's grave.

== Cast ==
- Naveen Chandra as ACP Aravind(Telugu)/Aravindan(Tamil) IPS (the real Benjamin)
- Reyaa Hari in a dual role as:
  - Sanjana
    - Sachana Namidass as young Sanjana
  - Anjana
    - Sadhana Namidass as young Anjana
- Dileepan as SI Manohar
- Shashank as ACP Ranjith Kumar IPS
- Abhirami as Shanthi Ravi
- Riythvika in a dual role as:
  - Meera
  - Tara
- Master Frankenstein as S. Benjamin Paul
- Master Sylvenstein as S. Francis Paul
- Aadukalam Naren as Chandrasekar IPS, Commissioner of Police
- Ravi Varma as Ravi
- Arjai in a dual role as:
  - Dheeran
  - Dheeraj
- Kireeti Damaraju in a dual role as:
  - Surendar
  - Sudhakar
- Suma as Mother Helen

== Production ==
In mid-August 2023, director Sundar C's associate director who had worked in films such as Kalakalappu 2 (2018), Vantha Rajavathaan Varuven (2019) and Action (2019), Lokkesh Ajls was announced to make his directorial debut through the film Eleven. The Tamil-Telugu language bilingual film was launched after a formal pooja, which has actor Naveen Chandra as the lead actor alongside the film producer Reyaa Hari as the female lead who last appeared and bankrolled Sila Nerangalil Sila Manidhargal (2022). The investigative thriller film also stars Shashank, Abhirami, Dileepan, Riythvika, Aadukalam Naren, Ravi Varma, Arjai, Kireeti Damaraju and others in pivotal roles.

The film has music composed by D. Imman, cinematography handled by Karthik Ashokan and editing by N. B. Srikanth. Principal photography was planned to begin on 23 August 2023. Post the completion of the filming, on 19 June 2024, the film teaser was released by Dhanush and Nikhil Siddhartha, featuring Naveen as a police officer being assigned to a murder case.

== Music ==
Eleven

Soundtrack album by D. Imman
- Studios: D.Imman’s Sound Factory (Audio suite A and B), Chennai
- Genre: Feature film soundtrack
- Language: Tamil / Telugu
- Label: Saregama
- Producers: D. Imman, Ranjan

D. Imman chronology
Petta Rap (2024)	Eleven (2024)	2K Love Story (2024)

Singles from Eleven
- 1. "The Devil is Waiting" Released: 11 October 2024; 2. "Azhagaana Arakkana / Thaguvaadu Dorikene" Released: 6 November 2024; 3. "Ikkada Raa" Released: 21 February 2025

The music and background score is composed by D. Imman. The first single "The Devil is Waiting" was unveiled by Kamal Hassan on 11 October 2024, having voice lent by Shruti Hassan and lyrics penned by the director Lokkesh himself. The second single "Azhagaana Arakkana" in Tamil and "Thaguvaadu Dorikene" in Telugu got released on 6 November 2024. The promo song "Ikkada Raa" released on 21 February 2025.

Tamil
No.	Title	Lyrics	Singer(s)	Length
1.	"The Devil is Waiting"	Lokkesh Ajls	Shruti Haasan	4:22
2.	"Azhagaana Arakkana"	Vishnu Edavan	Jonita Gandhi	4:16
3.	"Ikkada Raa"	Rakendu Mouli	Andrea Jeremiah	3:14
4.	"Vidiyaatha Vaanam Yenga Pochu"	Kabilan	Mano	4:18
5.	"Hey Siri"	Vishnu Edavan	Arun Parandhaman, Manoj Krishna, Joewin Shamalina, Adhira Suresh	2:47
Total length:				19:03

Telugu
No.	Title	Lyrics	Singer(s)	Length
1.	"The Devil is Waiting"	Lokkesh Ajls	Shruti Haasan	4:22
2.	"Thaguvaadu Dorikene"	Rakendu Mouli	Shweta Mohan	4:16
3.	"Ikkada Raa"	Rakendu Mouli	Andrea Jeremiah	4:13
4.	"Thathinakkara Thaalam Lona"	Rakendu Mouli	Deepak Blue, Manoj Krishna, Punya Selva	2:47
5.	"Cheelintha Ningey Rendai Nedu"	Rakendu Mouli	Mano	4:18
Total length:				19:03

== Release ==
=== Theatrical ===
Eleven was released 16 May 2025. Earlier, the film was scheduled for 15 November 2024, but was later postponed to 22 November 2024.

=== Home media ===
The post-theatrical streaming rights have been acquired by Amazon Prime Video, Blacksheep Value, Aha, ManoramaMAX and Lionsgate Play. and the satellite rights were sold to Star Vijay & Colors Tamil.

== Reception ==
Jayabhuvaneshwari B of Cinema Express rated it 2.5 out of 5 and stated, "Eleven tries to light up the screen with its innovative premise, but like its own killer, it gets lost in the shadows of predictability and missed opportunities". The Times of India too gave the same rating and quoted " competent execution can't save a tired plot". Sakshi Post rated it 2.75 out of 5 and stated, Eleven is a visually engaging thriller with commendable performances and a thought-provoking premise. Though it may not break new ground in the genre, it succeeds in creating a moody, suspenseful experience that fans of crime dramas are likely to appreciate".
