= Salony Luthra =

Indian actress

- Born: Mumbai Maharashtra
- Occupation: Actress
- Years active: 2013–Present

Salony Luthra is an Indian actress who worked in English, Tamil and Telugu-language films.

== Early life and career ==
Salony was brought up in Shimla, India. She works as a theater artiste in Mumbai and Pondicherry. She made her lead film debut with the Tamil-language film Sarabham (2014) starring Naveen Chandra. She landed the role after being selected from a hundred applicants. In the film, she played dual roles as a normal woman and a drug addict. To prepare for the film, she learnt the Tamil language. For the negative character, she watched Hollywood films and hung out with people who smoked.

She has starred in several productions including the Hindi-language adaptation of the novel Blackbird by David Harrower.

She was signed to play a role in Parandhu Sella Vaa and shot for the film in Singapore. However, she left the project citing differences with the director. She has also featured in several short films including Oliyum Oliyum as a blind street vendor and Kajal as a working woman. In 2018, she starred in the Hollywood films Turned Out and Forbidden as a Spanish woman and an Indian medical student, respectively. She made her Telugu debut with Bhanumathi & Ramakrishna in which she was paired with Naveen Chandra for a second time. She played an independent woman in the film.

== Filmography ==
=== Feature films ===
| Year | Title | Role | Language | Notes |
|---|---|---|---|---|
| 2013 | Siddharth | Train Enquiry Lady | Hindi | |
| 2014 | Sarabham | Shruti and Sanjana Chandrasekar | Tamil | |
| 2018 | Turned Out | Isha | English | |
| 2020 | Bhanumathi & Ramakrishna | Bhanumathi | Telugu | |

=== Short films ===
| Year | Title | Role | Language | Notes |
|---|---|---|---|---|
| 2016 | Oliyum Oliyum | Visually challenged woman | Tamil | |
| 2017 | Kajal | Kajal | Hindi | |
| 2018 | Forbidden | Jasleen | English; Punjabi | |

=== Television ===
| Year | Title | Language | Notes |
|---|---|---|---|
| 2016 | Under The Rupee - Hungary | English | Line producer |

== Awards and nominations ==
| Year | Award | Category | Work | Result | Ref. |
|---|---|---|---|---|---|
| 2014 | Ananda Vikatan Cinema Awards | Best Villain — Female | Sarabham | Won | |
| 2016 | New York Film Festival | Best Actress | Kajal | Won | |
| 2016 | Florence Film Festival | Best Actress | Kajal | Won | |
| 2016 | LA Film Festival | Best Actress | Kajal | Won | |
| 2016 | Jaipur International Film Festival | Best Actress | Kajal | Won | |
| 2017 | Filmfare Awards | Best Actress | Kajal | Nominated | |
| 2020 | FFTG Awards | Best Actress | Forbidden | Nominated | |
| 2021 | South Indian International Movie Awards | Best Debut Actress - Telugu | Bhanumathi & Ramakrishna | Nominated | |
