= Anuradha Sriram =

Indian musician (born 1970)

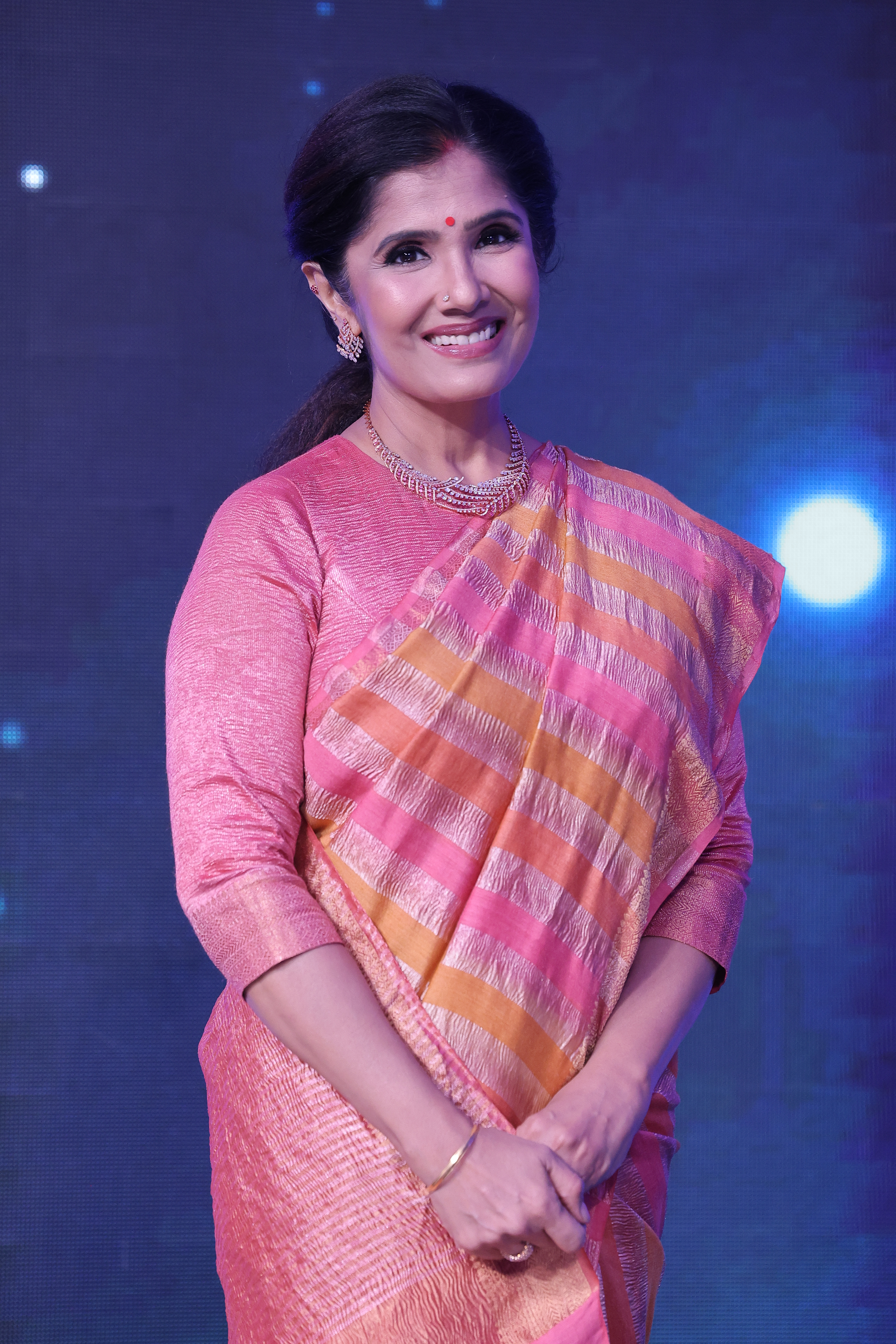

Background information
- Born: Anuradha Mohan; 9 July 1970 (age 56); Chennai, Tamil Nadu, India
- Genres: Carnatic; Hindustani Music; Filmi; Fusion; Pop
- Occupations: Singer; Television personality; Dubbing artist
- Years active: 1980, 1995–present
- Spouse: Sriram Parasuram
- Website: anuradhasriram.com
- Education: Ethnomusicology
- Alma mater: Wesleyan University (MA)

Anuradha Sriram (née Mohan; born 9 July 1970) is an Indian playback and classical singer. She is also a film composer and a voice artist. She has recorded over 5,000 songs in various Indian languages including Tamil, Telugu, Malayalam, Kannada, Bengali, Hindi and in Sinhala. She is the recipient of Filmfare Best Female Playback Singer Award and Karnataka State Film Award. She has also received the Kalaimamani award from Government of Tamilnadu and the honorary Doctorate for her contributions to Indian music by Sathyabama University in 2012.

Anuradha collaborated with her husband Sriram Parasuram and composed music for the film Five Star (2002). On the television front, she has been a judge of a number of Tamil reality shows like Sun Singer, Airtel Super Singer and Malayalam reality shows like Idea Star Singer and Top Singer across various seasons.

== Early life ==
Anuradha was born in Chennai to playback singer Renuka Devi and Meenakshi Sundaram Mohan. She did her primary schooling at St. Francis Anglo-Indian Girls School, Coimbatore. She then studied at Padma Seshadri Bala Bhavan, Chennai. She has a B.A and M.A in music from Queen Mary's College, Chennai of Madras University and secured the university gold medal in both the courses. She was given a fellowship to do her Master of Arts degree in Ethnomusicology and Composition from Wesleyan University, Connecticut, United States.

== Career ==
=== Film songs ===
Anuradha's first stint into films was as a child artist in the 1980 Tamil film Kaali. Her playback singing career began with her chorus performance of "Malarodu Malaringu" and "Idhu Annai Bhoomi" from the film Bombay composed by A. R. Rahman. In the same year, she was noticed in the song "Ini Achham Illai" from the film Indira, again composed by Rahman and the song "Meenamma" from the film Aasai, composed by Deva, became her breakthrough. After a couple of years of singing exclusively for Tamil, Telugu and Kannada films, she made her Bollywood debut in Ram Jaane and Virasat (1997) with the song "Jayengi Pee Ke".

Having sung more than 4,000 songs in Tamil, Telugu, Kannada, and Malayalam, and six North Indian languages, some of her Tamil hits are "Nalam Nalam Ariyaaval" (Kadhal Kottai), "Dilruba Dilruba" (Priyam), "Un Uthattora Sivappe" (Pachanlankurichi), "Anbendra Mazhayile" (Minsara Kanavu), "Malligaye Malligaye" (Ninaithen Vandhai), "Nilavai Konduvaa" (Vaalee), "Roja Poonthottam" (Kannukkul Nilavu), "Karu Karu Karuppayi" (Eazhaiyin Sirippil), "Oru Ponnu Onnu" (Kushi), "Karupputhan Enakku Pidicha" (Vetri Kodi Kattu), "Endi Soodamani" (Pammal K. Sambandam), "Ollikuchhi Udambukkari" (Red), "O Podu" (Gemini, "Kai Kai Kai Vekkura" (Bagavathi), "Enna Nenacha" (Chokka Thangam), "Lesa Lesa" (Lesa Lesa) and "Appadi Podu" (Ghilli) among many others. Her collaboration with Deva produced multiple popular songs, most of them being in folk genre. Their combination is well-regarded for delivering catchy and memorable melodies in Tamil cinema. She has collaborated with all the leading Tamil film composers such as Ilaiyaraaja, A. R. Rahman, Deva, Vidyasagar, Sirpy, Adithyan, Yuvan Shankar Raja, S. A. Rajkumar, Bharadwaj, Dhina, Srikanth Deva, D. Imman, Harris Jayaraj, Joshua Sridhar, Pravin Mani and G. V. Prakash Kumar.

In 1995, she debuted in Telugu cinema by recording three songs composed by Bharadwaj for the film Sogasu Chuda Taramaa. However, it was for the soundtrack of Annamayya, she received wide acclaim. Composed by M. M. Keeravani, the soundtrack featured four songs sung by Anuradha. She went on to sing for many films in the late 1990s and continued to sing for big production films throughout the 2000s. Kalisundam Raa, Yuvaraju, Jayam Manadera, Nuvve Kavali all released in 2000, Murari, Eduruleni Manishi, Ninnu Choodalani, Bava Nachadu, Daddy all released in 2001, Nuvve Nuvve (2002), Seetayya (2003), Vikramarkudu (2006), Dubai Seenu (2007), Kalidasu (2008) and Ragada (2010) were some of the films which had popular songs recorded by Anuradha.

In 1998, the song "Kushalave Kshemave" from the film Yaare Neenu Cheluve marked her first venture into Kannada playback singing. Her songs from the films Preethsod Thappa (1998), Preethse (1999), Diggajaru (2001), Malla (2004), Anna Thangi (2005), Ayya (2005) were acclaimed. She recorded numerous songs and collaborated frequently with Hamsalekha and V. Ravichandran.

Anuradha's entry into Malayalam cinema was in 1995 for the film Arabia which had music composed by Ouseppachan. She recorded more popular songs for the films such as Red Indians, Meesa Madhavan, Seetha Kalyanam, Daddy Cool, Makaramanju, Seniors, Ozhimuri, Ayaal, Vasanthathinte Kanal Vazhikalil and Rakshadhikari Baiju Oppu.

In Hindi, most of her hits were from collaboration with Anu Malik. They both worked in films such as Virasat, Gharwali Baharwali (1998), Biwi No.1 and Hum Aapke Dil Mein Rehte Hain in 1999, Kuch Khatti Kuch Meethi and Mujhe Kucch Kehna Hai in 2001, Chor Machaaye Shor (2002) and Shaadi No. 1 (2005). The song "Jhin Min Jhini" from Vishal Bhardwaj's Maqbool (2004) was widely acclaimed.

=== Classical and Non-film songs ===
Anuradha has performed extensively all over India and the US, and has given many radio and TV programmes since the age of 12. She specialises in Carnatic music and has sung in over 1,000 concerts worldwide.

Anuradha has several Devotional albums to her credit. She also collaborates with her husband Sriram Parasuram on their classical music Jugalbandhi concerts and their TV programme Elaame Sangeetham Thaan. She has also presented many music programmes on TV.

=== Music composing and Voice acting ===
Anuradha has composed music for the film Five Star and television series Sivamayam produced by Radaan for Sun TV along with her husband. She also worked as a voice actor lending her voice for Kiran Rathod in the film Anbe Sivam (2003).

== Personal life ==
Anuradha is married to singer Sriram Parasuram (whom she met at Wesleyan University). They have two sons named Jayant and Lokesh. Her brother Murugan is also a playback singer.

== Awards and recognition ==
Karnataka State Film Awards

- 1999 : Best Female Playback – "Omkara Naadamaya" (Hrudayanjali)

Filmfare Awards South

- 2003 : Filmfare Award for Best Female Playback Singer - Tamil - "O Podu" (Gemini)

International Tamil Film Awards

- 2003 : ITFA Best Female Playback Award – "O Podu" (Gemini)

2006 : Kalaimamani by the Government of Tamilnadu for her significant contribution to the field of music.

2012 : honorary Doctorate by the Sathyabama University for her accomplishments and contribution to the field of music.

== Discography ==
Anuradha has recorded songs since 1995 and done work in Tamil, Telugu, Hindi, Malayalam, Kannada and other regional variants. She has also produced various pop albums, jingles for advertisements and television.

=== Albums ===
List of Anuradha Sriram albums
Year	Title	Song(s)	Notes	Co-Actress / Co-Singer	Ref.
1997	Chennai Girl	"Modern Ponnu" "Kaadhal Kaadhal" "Uyirin Uyir" "Assa Assami" "Kanavu Nanavagum" (Dream Come True) "Gaga Mama" (Endless Love) "Onnu Onnu" (One Plus One); Mann Vasanai (Rain Songs); We Are Free	Composed by Paul Jacob	Herself	
1999	Savariya	"Once Upon A Time" "Barkha Ritu"	Composed by 3 Brothers and a Violin	Sriram Parasuram, Radha Vishwanathan	
2010	Endendu	"Hoovanu Arasi"	Composed by East Coast Vijayan	Solo	

== Television ==
Year	Program	Channel	Language	Notes
1997	Premi	Sun TV	Tamil	Title song (with P. Unnikrishnan)
2001	Soolam	Sun TV	Tamil	Title song
2006	Airtel Super Singer 2006	Vijay TV	Tamil	
2009	Gandharvasangeetham senior	Kairali TV	Malayalam	
2009	Gandharvasangeetham 2010	Kairali TV	Malayalam	
2010	Super Singer Junior (season 2)	Vijay TV	Tamil	
2011–2012	Idea Star singer season 6	Asianet	Malayalam	
2013	Sun Singer	Sun TV	Tamil	
2013	Surya Singer	Surya TV	Malayalam	
2013	Sun Singer	Sun TV	Tamil	Season 2
2013	Surya Singer	Surya TV	Malayalam	Season 2
2014	Chandralekha	Sun TV	Tamil	Title song
2014	Star Singer 7	Asianet	Malayalam	
2014–15	Sun Singer	Sun TV	Tamil	Season 3
2015	Surya Challenge	Surya TV	Malayalam	Team captain
2016	Sun Singer	Sun TV	Tamil	Season 4
2016–17	Sun Singer	Sun TV	Tamil	Season 5
2018	Super Singer 6	Star Vijay	Tamil	
2019–2020	Top Singer	Flowers	Malayalam	
2019–20	Super Singer 7	Star Vijay	Tamil	
2020–2022	Top Singer season 2	Flowers	Malayalam	
2021	Super Singer 8	Star Vijay	Tamil	
2021	Super Singer Junior	Star Vijay	Tamil	
2022–2023	Top Singer season 3	Flowers	Malayalam	
2022– 2023	Super Singer 9	Star Vijay	Tamil	Permanent Judge
2023	Malar	Sun TV	Tamil	Title song
2023–2024	Super Singer 10	Star Vijay	Tamil	Permanent Judge
2024	Top Singer season 4	Flowers	Malayalam	Guest judge
2025	Super Singer 11	Star Vijay	Tamil	Permanent Judge
