= Bhanumathi & Ramakrishna =

2020 romantic drama directed by Srikanth Nagothi

- Release Poster
- Directed by: Srikanth Nagothi
- Written by: Srikanth Nagothi
- Produced by: Yashwanth Mulukutla
- Starring: Naveen Chandra; Salony Luthra
- Cinematography: Sai Prakash Ummadisingu
- Edited by: Ravikanth Perepu
- Music by: Shravan Bharadwaj
- Production company: North Star Entertainment
- Distributed by: Aha
- Release date: 3 July 2020
- Running time: 93 minutes
- Country: India
- Language: Telugu

Bhanumathi & Ramakrishna is a 2020 Indian Telugu-language romantic drama film written and directed by Srikanth Nagothi starring Naveen Chandra and Salony Luthra. The plot follows relationship of a couple who are in their thirties. The film was released on Aha on 3 July 2020.

== Plot ==
Bhanumathi, a 30-year old working woman is dumped by Ram who wants to seek marriage with a younger woman. Bhanu, though discontented, decides to move on. Meanwhile, Ramakrishna, a 33-year old free-spirited bachelor from Tenali, is offered a better paying job at Hyderabad in the same company where Bhanu works. Ramakrishna accepts the offer and moves into Bunty's apartment. Though hardworking, Ramakrishna struggles to speak English fluently which is abhorred by Bhanu who perceives him as being mediocre.

Bhanu and Ramakrishna are given a 4-day off on the occasion of Sankranti. Ramakrishna advises Bhanu to visit her parents in Vijayawada. Although reluctant, she decides to go with him after her roommates leave to Goa on vacation. Ramakrishna and Bhanu drive to Vijayawada together where Ramakrishna tells her that his family is looking for a match to him. Bhanu's parents also insist her on getting married. Later in Hyderabad, Ramakrishna tells Bhanu that he is rejected by his match after knowing his age. Bhanu relates with him and they start getting closer.

Bhanu notices that Ramakrishna is rejecting the letters sent by his sister who eloped with her lover a few years ago. Bhanu takes Ramakrishna to his sister's place without his knowledge, where he gets emotional after seeing his sister and her son. Following this, Bhanu and Ramakrishna develop feelings on each other. Ramakrishna, however, decides to return her favour by sending an e-mail pretending as Bhanu to Ram, asking to reconcile their past relationship. In reply, Nimmi, Ram's fiancé calls up Bhanu and rudely warns her not to contact again. Knowing this, Bhanu chastises Ramakrishna, asking him not to interfere in her personal life. Disheartened Ramakrishna leaves to his hometown.

Bhanu however, feels guilty for being harsh on Ramakrishna and decides to meet him. Arriving at his place, Bhanu expresses her love and seeks forgiveness. They both reunite and affectionately kiss each other.

== Cast ==
- Naveen Chandra as Ramakrishna
- Salony Luthra as Bhanumathi "Bhanu" Devineni
- Viva Harsha as Bunty
- Raja Chembolu as Ram
- Shalini Vadnikatti as Nimisha "Nimmi" Bopanna
- Ravikanth Perepu as Bhanu's date
- Devyani Sharma as Isha
- Ajay as Manish
- Kalpa Latha as Ramakrishna's mother
- Ragini as Ramakrishna's aunt
- Appaji Ambarisha Darbha as Bhanu's father
- Jaya Naidu as Bhanu's mother

== Release ==
The film was originally titled Bhanumathi Ramakrishna, but upon orders from the Madras High Court, it was retitled Bhanumathi & Ramakrishna. A disclaimer was added, explaining that the film was not a biographical film about the actress P. Bhanumathi (also known as Bhanumathi Ramakrishna).

== Reception ==
The Times of India gave the film three and half stars out of five and called it a "perfect and clean blend of love innocence and humour," particularly praising Nagothi's writing and Chandra's performance. Sangeetha Devi Dundoo of The Hindu stated that the film has a well written female protagonist. She also praised the film's screenplay which gradually develops the relationship between the couple without ever being "overly cinematic."

Ashameera Ayyappan writing for The New Indian Express, gave three and half starts out of five and said that the film explores mismatch of expectations between men and women. While praising the characters, she opined that the film should have explored a little more on their relationship.
