= Jajantaram Mamantaram =

2003 Indian film by Soumitra Ranade

- Theatrical Release Poster
- Directed by: Soumitra Ranade
- Written by: Soumitra Ranade (story); Yogesh Vinayak Joshi (script and dialogues)
- Screenplay by: Soumitra Ranade
- Story by: Soumitra Ranade
- Based on: Gulliver’s Travels by Jonathan Swift
- Produced by: Arunima Roy
- Starring: Jaaved Jaffrey; Gulshan Grover
- Cinematography: Joginder Panda
- Edited by: Aseem Sinha
- Music by: Three Brothers And A Violin
- Production company: iDream Production
- Release date: 30 May 2003
- Running time: 114 minutes
- Country: India
- Language: Hindi
- Budget: ₹8.5 crore
- Box office: ₹5.7 crore

Jajantaram Mamantaram is a 2003 Indian Hindi-language fantasy action comedy film written and directed by Soumitra Ranade and produced by Arunima Roy. The film is based on Jonathan Swift's 1726 novel Gulliver's Travels.

== Plot ==
The film follows the journey of Aditya, a young man who finds himself transported to a mystical island inhabited by miniature people. Encountering a world beyond his imagination, Aditya embarks on a series of adventures, navigating through the challenges and wonders of the tiny civilization. Along the way, he forms unexpected friendships and confronts adversaries, all while striving to find his way back home.

== Cast ==
- Javed Jaffrey as Aditya Pandit
- Gulshan Grover as Chattan Singh
- Joy Fernandes as Jhamunda
- Manav Kaul as Jeran
- Madhura Velankar as Rajkumari Amolhi
- Nishith Dadhich as Bantul
- Dilip Joglekar as Bhoopati
- Kavita Murkar as Chotu's mother
- Dipannita Sharma as Jalpari

== Soundtrack ==
Soundtrack was composed by Three Brothers and Violin.

- Mil gaye yaro ab hum - Udit narayan
- Gumsum Gumsum – Nihay, Madhumitha, Tanmay
- Rambam - Usha Uthup
- Chaal hain - Gulshan Grover

== Reception ==
Taran Adarsh of IndiaFM gave the film 1.5 out of 5, writing, "On the whole, J2M2 leaves you wondering if this really is 'josh ka naya mantram'. The film might appeal to a section of the audience [kids], but a universal appeal is ruled out. Also, a difficult-to-pronounce title will only go against it. However, excellent promotion by iDream may salvage the show to an extent in big cities."
