= Sundaattam =

- Theatrical release poster
- Directed by: Brahma G. Dev
- Written by: Brahma G. Dev
- Produced by: R. Annadurai
- Starring: Irfan; Arundhati
- Cinematography: Balagurunathan
- Edited by: LVK. Dass
- Music by: Britto Michael; Achu Rajamani (BGM)
- Production company: Film Fame Production
- Release date: 8 March 2013
- Country: India
- Language: Tamil

Sundaattam (transl. Carrom) is a 2013 Indian Tamil-language gangster film written and directed by Brahma G. Dev. Irfan plays the hero and the newfound Arundhati as heroine. Britto Michael has composed the music and Achu Rajamani composed the background score. Sundattam is based on Carrom gambling in Royapuram area in North Madras. The film, which is based on a real-life incident set in the backdrop of Chennai in the 1990s, released on 8 March 2013.

== Cast ==
- Irfan as Prabhakaran
- Arundhati as Kalaivani
- Madhu as Kasi
- Aadukalam Naren as Bhagya Annachi
- Stalin as Guna
- Sendrayan as Prabhakaran's friend
- Meesha Ghoshal as Uma

== Soundtrack ==
Soundtrack was composed by Britto Michael. A critic from News18 said it "has moments of melody, but only for a short term".

Track listing
No.	Title	Lyrics	Singer(s)	Length
1.	"Narumugaye"	Snehan	Aalap Raju, Madhumitha	4:32
2.	"Adi Unnale"	Na. Muthukumar	Karthik	4:14
3.	"Nethiyilae"	Marana Gana Viji	Kaali	4:30
4.	"Kan Kondu"	Britto Michael	Britto Michael	2:46
5.	"Kadhal Varum Varai"	Palani Bharathi	Saindhavi	4:38
6.	"Vizhiyil Vithai"	Britto Michael	Ranjith, Madhu, Roshini	3:37
Total length:				24:17

== Reception ==
Sify wrote "On the whole, Sundattam is not entirely unwatchable". The Hindu wrote that the director was unable to "make up his mind" whether Sundaattam was "a gangster film or a sports movie. He had ignored the conventions of both theses genres making it a bad hybrid". The New Indian Express wrote "Unlike Striker, Sundattam just doesn’t strike the right chord". Daijiworld wrote that the film "struggles occasionally to convince the audience that the game of carrom was merely used as a backdrop to build the narrative. However, it scores high with its deft screenplay that stays away from cliches".
