= Sambhavami Yuge Yuge (2006 film) =

2006 Indian Telugu film by Ravi Varma

- DVD cover
- Directed by: Ravi Varma
- Written by: Jack; Yathi Raj (dialogues)
- Screenplay by: Ravi Varma
- Produced by: Koduri Narendar Reddy; Koduri Madhusudan Reddy; Saibabu Jagarlamudi
- Starring: Anji; Koutilya; Raj; Srijana; Neeraja; Jack
- Cinematography: A. N. Raja
- Edited by: C. V. Rao
- Music by: Anil
- Production companies: Illusions; First Frame Entertainments; KN Reddy Movies
- Release date: 10 March 2006
- Country: India
- Language: Telugu

Sambhavami Yuge Yuge is a 2006 Indian Telugu-language action drama film directed by Ravi Varma and starring newcomers Anji, Koutilya, Raj, Srijana, Neeraja and Jack. The film is a remake of the Brazilian film City of God (2002; which is an adaptation of the 1997 Paulo Lins novel City of God). This was Naveen Chandra's first film.

== Cast ==
- Naveen Chandra as Anji (credited as Anji)
- Koutilya as Gopi
- Raj as Ali
- Srijana as Shalini
- Neeraja as Ali's girlfriend
- Jack as Mallanna
- Sitara as Anji's girlfriend
- Mani Mahesh
- Costumes Krishna as Anji's father
- Hussain
- Sathya Priya
- Nisha
- Noel Sean

== Production ==
Naveen Chandra made his debut with this film under the stage name of Anji. Shooting for the film began on 18 July 2005. Noel Sean also made his debut with this film in a small role.

== Soundtrack ==
The music was composed by debutante Anil in 2005 and was well received. Lyrics were by Krishna Chaitanya. The audio rights were bagged by Madhura Entertainment.

A critic from Telugucinema.com opined that "the magic of the music that this album exhibits removes a feel that this is of a standard come-and-go kind standard to this scale of movies". After this film, Krishna Chaitanya worked as a lyricist under Anil for several films.

- "Alale Pongenu Vegamgaa" - Ramki
- "Vela Vela Kaantulanni" - Nayani, Rohit
- "Paikam Munumunduku Tosina Maikam" - Nidheesh Gopalan, Sindhu Rajaram
- "Cheekati Undi Veluge Raanandi" - Vijay
- "Leta Tamalapaaku Kattaro" - Ranjith, Malgudi Subha
- "Andagatte Mundarunte" - Giri
- "Dance Fight" (Music bit)
- "Alale Pongenu Vegamgaa" (Instrumental) - Nidheesh Gopalan, Vijay, Sindhu Rajaram

== Reception ==
Navya Vaitla of Telugucinema.com wrote that "The director's inability to structure the scenes is major flaw. There is no smooth flow from one scene to another. Much of the film including its premise is very superficial. And it lacks nativity. The second half is quite boring".
