= Gulshan Grover =

Indian actor and film producer

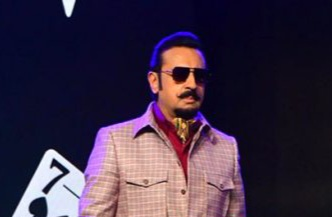
- Grover in 2026
- Born: 21 September 1955 (age 70); New Delhi, India
- Occupations: Actor; Film producer
- Years active: 1980–present
- Spouses: Filomina Grover (m. 1998; div. 2001) Kashish Grover (m. 2001; div. 2002)

Gulshan Grover (born 21 September 1955) is an Indian actor and film producer who has appeared in over 100 films. He is popularly known as the "Bad Man" of Hindi cinema because of his ability to create an impact with his negative roles in films.

== Early life ==
Grover was born into a Punjabi family in New Delhi to a Hindu father and a Sikh mother. He holds a post graduate degree from Delhi's Shri Ram College of Commerce and was associated with ‘Little Theatre Group’ for a long time before launching into the Hindi film industry.

== Awards ==
Year	From	Award	Film	Result
2011	New York Indian Film Festival	Best Actor International	Desperate Endeavors	Won
2011	WorldFest-Houston International Film Festival	Best Actor	Desperate Endeavors	Won
2011/2012	TSR-TV9 National Film Awards	contribution to Indian & International Cinema	contribution	Won
2012	Stardust Awards	Searchlight Awards-Best Actor	I Am Kalam	Won
2020	FFTG Awards	Best Actor	Forbidden	Won

== Selected filmography ==
=== Hindi films ===
Year	Film	Role	Notes
1980	Hum Paanch	Mahavir	
1981	Bulundi	Vikram's friend	Cameo
1981	Rocky	Jagga	
1982	Arth	Gulshan	
1983	Sadma	Balma	
1983	Avtaar	Chandar Kishan	
1984	Mashaal	Munna	
1984	Andar Baahar	Gulshan	
1984	Insaaf Kaun Karega	Baggad	
1984	Sohni Mahiwal	Noor	
1985	Paththar	Ravi Rai	
1985	Saamri	Khanna	
1986	Manav Hatya		
1988	Mera Muqaddar	Suraj	
1988	Aag Ke Sholay		
1988	Veerana	Raghu	
1988	Khatron Ke Khiladi	Bahadur	
1989	Waqt Ke Zanjeer		
1989	Pyar Ke Naam Qurbaan	Master Dayashankar/ Daciat Shankar	
1989	Ram Lakhan	Kesariya Vilayati	
1989	Eeshwar	Natwarlal	
1989	Love Love Love	Vikram (Vicky)	
1989	Ladaai	Peter	
1989	Kanoon Apna Apna	Kailash Bhadbole	
1990	Lohe Ke Haath	Triloki	
1990	Doodh Ka Karz	Ajit B. Singh	
1991	Jeevan Daata		
1991	Raiszaada	Inspector Wafadaar Gupta	
1991	Izzat	Ganpat Singh	
1991	Kurbaan	Dacait Himmat Singh	
1991	Saudagar	Baliram	
1991	Banjaran	Shakti Singh	
1992	Tyagi	Prem Dayal	
1992	Vishwatma	Tapasvi Gunjal: Sonia's former fiancé	
1992	Vajraghat		
1992	Tahalka	Allah Rakha	
1992	Jigar	Inspector Pradhan	
1992	Dil Hi To Hai	Jack	
1992	Dushman Zamana	Thapa	
1992	Shola Aur Shabnam	Kali Shankar	
1992	Police Officer	John	
1992	Umar 55 Ki Dil Bachpan Ka	Malhotra	
1993	Anari	Chhote Raja Vinay Singh	
1993	Apaatkaal	Nikka Shaitaan	
1993	Sir	Chappan Tikli / Jimmy	Nominated - Filmfare Award for Best Villian
1994	Vijaypath	Shakti	
1994	Kanoon	Raja Thakur	
1994	Yaar Gaddar		
1994	Kaniyaa		
1994	Raja Babu		
1994	Dilwale	Shankar Bihari	
1994	Mohra	Tyson	
1994	Aag	Thakur Madhav Singh	
1994	Zamane Se Kya Darna		
1995	Naajayaz	David	
1995	Sabse Bada Khiladi	Inspector K.Kada	
1995	Criminal	Robert Rakesh Kumar	
1995	Raghuveer	Nitiram Chanakya	
1995	The Gambler	Billa	
1995	Ram Jaane	Bhau	
1996	Raja Ki Aayegi Baraat	Gyani Kartar Singh	
1996	Diljale	Inspector Yajwendra	
1996	Khiladiyon Ka Khiladi	King Don	
1997	Ghoonghat	Sher Khan	
1997	Yes Boss	Bhushan	
1997	Mr. and Mrs. Khiladi	Vicky	
1998	Sher-E-Hindustan	Minister Choudhary Charannath Lal Rai	
1998	2001: Do Hazaar Ek	Krishna Rao	
1998	Duplicate	Shalaku	
1998	Sar Utha Ke Jiyo		
1998	Mehndi	Sikh Truck Driver	Uncredited
1998	Ghar Bazar		
1998	Angaaray	Lala Roshanlal	
1999	1947: Earth		
1999	International Khiladi	Thakral	
1999	Hindustan Ki Kasam	Jabbar	Nominated - Zee Cine Awards for Best Performance in a Negative Role
1999	Hum Tum Pe Marte Hain	Udhed Singh	
2000	Aaghaaz	Sadanand Kutty	
2000	Hera Pheri	Kabeera	
2001	Tales of The Kama Sutra 2: Monsoon		
2001	16 December	Dost Khan	
2001	Lajja	Virender	
2001	Yeh Zindagi Ka Safar	Vivek Devan	
2002	3 Deewarein	Mohan	
2003	Fun2shh... Dudes in the 10th Century	Chindi Chor/King Babushah	double role
2003	Boom	Medium Mia / Cutpiece Salim Suiting Shirting/love and physical interest of Katrina Kaif in this movie	
2003	Jism	Rohit Khanna	
2003	Ek Aur Ek Gyarah	Panther	
2003	Jajantaram Mamantaram	Chattan Singh	
2004	Dil Maange More	Rahman	
2004	Ek Se Badkhar Ek		
2004	Taarzan: The Wonder Car	Inspector Khurana	
2005	Dus	Irrfan/Jamwal	
2005	Qattle-E-Aam	Shiva	
2006	Tom, Dick and Harry		
2006	Family - Ties of Blood		
2006	Ek Khiladi Ek Haseena		
2006	Tathastu		
2006	Shaadi Se Pehle	Luca	
2006	Gangster	Khan Bhai	
2006	Eight: The Power of Shani		
2006	Anthony Kaun Hai?		
2007	Dhokha		
2007	Fool n Final	Choksi	
2007	Cape Karma		
2007	Showbiz		
2008	Jumbo		
2008	Karzzzz	Sir Juda	
2008	Love Story 2050	Dr. Hoshi	
2009	Victory	Andy	
2009	Acid Factory	ACP Ranbir Singh	
2009	Zor Lagaa Ke...Haiya!		
2010	Kajraare	Avtar Singh	
2010	Mittal v/s Mittal		
2010	Virsa	Jogindar Singh Grewal	
2010	Knock Out	Bapuji	
2010	Crook	S.I. Joseph Pinto	
2010	Payback	Inspector Sawant	
2011	I Am Kalam	Bhati	
2011	Waqt-Ek Rishta		
2011	Bin Bulaye Baraati	Durjan Singh	
2012	Ganga Devi		
2012	Agent Vinod	Taimoor Paasha	Special appearance in the song "Dil Mera Muft Ka"
2013	Baat Bann Gayi	Laxmi Nivas	
2013	Rajdhani Express	Railway T.T.E.	
2013	Bullet Raja	Balraj Bajaj	
2013	Desires of the Heart	Pradeep	
2013	Sooper Se Ooper	Madho Singh Rathod	
2014	18.11 - A Code of Secrecy	Captain Rack	
2014	Yaariyan	Jimmy Sir - College principal	
2014	Station	Narrator	
2015	Honour Killing	Harjinder Singh	
2015	Kaun Kitne Paani Mein	Kharu Pahelwan - Co-lead	
2015	UnIndian	Deepak Khuranaa	
2015	I Love Desi	Bauji	
2016	Salaam Mumbai	Suraj	
2016	Waarrior Savitri	Satya's Dad	
2017	I'm Not A Terrorist	Abu Zar	
2017	Behen Hogi Teri	Dhappi Pehalwaan	
2018	Hate Story 4	Vikram Kurana	
2019	The Devil's Daughter	The Devil	
2019	Cabaret	Salim	Released on ZEE5
2020	Sadak 2	Dilip Hathkaata	
2021	Mumbai Saga	Naari Khan	
2021	Parvaaz: The Journey		
2021	Cash	Gautam Acharya	
2021	Sooryavanshi	Maulana Kader Usmani	
2022	The Good Maharaja		
2022	Nephilim	Voice of main villain Azazel	
2023	Charlie Chopra	Brigadier Meherbaan Singh Rawat	
2025	Heer Express		

=== English films ===
Year	Film	Role	Notes
1998	The Second Jungle Book: Mowgli & Baloo	Baldeo	
2002	Air Panic	Philip	
2002	Beeper	Sr. Inspector Vijay Kumar	
2004	American Daylight	Billoo	
2004	1:1.6 An Ode to Lost Love	Pramod	
2012	Desperate Endeavors	Dada Bhagwan	
2013	Prisoners of the Sun	Rohit	
2018	Forbidden	Jasleen's father	Short film; bilingual in Punjabi
2019	The Man from Kathmandu	Abu Mia Siddiqi	

=== Telugu films ===
Year	Film	Role	Notes
1985	Nyayam Meere Cheppali	Dilip	
1994	Criminal	Robert Rakesh Kumar	
2005	Balu	Khan	
2005	Subhash Chandra Bose	Officer George	
2014	April Fool		

=== Other language films ===
Year	Film	Role	Language	Notes
1990	Upkar Dudhache		Marathi	
1999	Branchie	John Paul	Italian	
2008	Yaariyan		Punjabi	
2009	Yuvah		Kannada	
2024	Indian 2	Amit Agarwal	Tamil	
2025	Sardaar Ji 3	Kaala Lahoriya	Punjabi	

=== Music videos ===
Year	Video	Artist
1999	"Sohni Lagdi"	Sajjad Ali
1999	"Sawan Mein Lag Gai"	Mika Singh
2014	"Desi Kalakaar"	Yo Yo Honey Singh

== Dubbing roles ==
=== Live-action television series ===
Title	Actor(s)	Character(s)	Dub Language	Original Language	Original Year Release	Dub Year Release	Channel/Network	Notes
Breaking Bad	Mark Margolis	Hector Salamanca	Hindi	English	2008	2023	Zee Cafe	

== Personal life ==
Grover was in a relationship with Pakistani actress Somy Ali, which ended after she became involved with Salman Khan. Grover also dated journalist Anita Pratap for a brief period.

== Bibliography ==
- Grover, Gulshan; Bhattacharya, Roshmila (19 July 2019). Bad Man. Ebury Publishing. ISBN 9780670092062.

== See also ==
- List of Indian film actors
