= Month of Madhu =

2023 film by Srikanth Nagothi

- Theatrical release poster
- Directed by: Srikanth Nagothi
- Written by: Srikanth Nagothi
- Produced by: Yaswanth Mulukutla
- Starring: Naveen Chandra; Swathi Reddy
- Cinematography: Rajeev Dharavath
- Edited by: Ravikanth Perepu
- Music by: Achu Rajamani
- Production companies: Krishiv Production; Handpicked Stories
- Release date: 6 October 2023
- Country: India
- Language: Telugu

Month of Madhu is a 2023 Indian Telugu-language romantic drama film written and directed by Srikanth Nagothi. It was produced by Yaswanth Mulukutla, under Krishiv Production and Handpicked Stories. The film featured Naveen Chandra and Swathi Reddy in the lead roles and was released on 6 October 2023 to positive reviews.

== Plot ==
After two decades of marriage, Lekha (Swathi Reddy) decides to separate from her husband, Madhusudhan Rao (Naveen Chandra). Simultaneously, an NRI teenager named Madhumitha (Shreya Navile) arrives in Vizag to attend her cousin's wedding. She accidentally crosses paths with Madhusudhan and delves into his personal life. What unfolds next? Does she mend his marital relationship or break it further? Why does Lekha want to separate from Madhu? What choice does Lekha ultimately make? The movie has the answers to these questions.

== Cast ==
- Naveen Chandra as Madhusudhan "Madhu" Rao
- Swathi Reddy as Lekha
- Shreya Navile as Madhumathi "Madhu"
- Manjula Ghattamaneni as Sarmishta Devi, Madhumathi's mother
- Harsha Chemudu as Madhusudhan's friend
- Raja Chembolu as Lekha's brother
- Raja Ravindra as Lawyer Chalapathi
- Gnaneswari Kandregula as Vasuki
- Uma YG
- Kancherapalem Kishore as Pharmacy Owner
- Raghav Rudra Mulpuru as Daksh
- Ruchita Sadineni as Bindu
- Mourya Siddavaram

== Music ==
All music is composed by Achu Rajamani.

Track listing
No.	Title	Lyrics	Singer(s)	Length
1.	"Naa Tholi Chinnari Premo"	Krishna Kanth	Haricharan Sheshadri, Aditi Bhavaraju	4:40
2.	"Oh Na Madhu"	Srikanth Nagothi	Karthik, Yamini Ghantasala	3:52
3.	"Swetcha Ledu"	Krishna Kanth	Andrea Jeremiah	3:13
4.	"You Gotta Live Your Life"	Krishna Kanth	Aditya Iyengar, Sharmila	2:58
5.	"Paluke Bangaaramaayena"	Bhadrachala Ramadasu	Aditi Bhavaraju, Achu Rajamani	2:02

== Release ==
Month of Madhu was released on 6 October 2023. Post-theatrical streaming rights were acquired by Aha and premiered on 3 November 2023. This film has also been available on Amazon Prime Video since 8 December 2023.

== Reception ==
The New Indian Express's Abhilasha Cherukuri gave a rating of 4 out of 5 and praised the writing, direction, music and performances of lead actors (Swathi and Naveen Chandra). Jahnavi of The News Minute also gave a rating of 4 out of 5 and prasied Swathi Reddy and the work of Srikanth Nagothi. She further added that the film "brings some delightful women to Telugu cinema – their desire for love, fun, self-fulfillment, sex, and everything else coming alive with a sensitive warmth".

Sangeetha Devi Dundoo of The Hindu praised the work of the lead actors and the direction while stating that "Month of Madhu shines in its attempt to show human relationships with all its warmth and shortcomings". The Times of India opined that the film stands as a testament to the intricacies of modern relationships. Further, the critic stated "Nagothi's storytelling, coupled with the compelling performances of the cast, creates an experience that lingers in the hearts of the audience".
