= Britto Michael =

- Born: 13 February 1986 (age 40); Neyveli, Tamil Nadu, India
- Occupations: Film composer, music director
- Instrument: keyboard/piano
- Years active: 2013–present

Britto Michael is an Indian film composer, sound engineer, songwriter and singer, who works predominantly in Tamil films. He made his debut with the film, Sundaattam in 2013.

== Career ==
Britto Michael came to Chennai to study, but got interested in scoring music. He has done title tracks for TV shows for Vijay TV, films before landing Sundattam as his first feature film, which became famous for the song "Narumugaye".

== Filmography ==
- Note: all films are in Tamil, unless otherwise noted.

=== As composer ===
Year	Film/Album	Songs	Score	Notes
2013	Sundattam	Yes	No	
2014	Sarabham	Yes	Yes	
2018	Koottali	Yes	Yes	
2021	Lift	Yes	Yes	
2023	Richie Gadi Pelli	No	Yes	Telugu film; background score only
2023	En Chennai Young Chennai Anthem	Yes	No	Album; only 1 song released
2026	Dashamakan	Yes	Yes	

=== As singer and lyricist ===
Year	Film	Song	Singer	Lyrics
2013	Sundattam	"Kan Kondu"	Yes	Yes
2013	Sundattam	"Vizhiyil Vithai"	No	Yes
2014	Sarabham	"Pudhidhai Oru Iravu"	Yes	No
2014	Sarabham	Bodhayil Padhai Marum	Yes	No
2018	Koottali	"Jil Jil Dilku Singari"	Yes	No
2018	Koottali	"Katti Izhukudhe"	Yes	No
2018	Koottali	"Porappo"	Yes	Yes
