= Forbidden (2018 film) =

- Film poster
- Directed by: Vibha Gulati
- Written by: Vibha Gulati
- Produced by: Vibha Gulati; Debbie Vandermuelen; Alena Svyatova; Raj Vasudeva
- Starring: Gulshan Grover; Salony Luthra; Gopal Divan; Dhanish Karthik
- Cinematography: Paul Rondeau
- Edited by: Manendra Singh Lodhi; Tristan Higgs
- Music by: Jordan Velgas
- Release date: April 26, 2018 (Julien Dubuque International Film Festival)
- Running time: 20 minutes
- Country: United States
- Languages: English; Punjabi

Forbidden is a 2018 Indian-American short drama film written, co-produced, and directed by Vibha Gulati and starring Gulshan Grover, Salony Luthra, Gopal Divan and Dhanish Karthik.

== Plot ==
Jasleen and Manpreet fall in love but eventually Jasleen faces the wrath of her father and brother, Fahwaz.

== Cast ==
- Gulshan Grover as "Papaji", Jasleen's father
- Salony Luthra as Jasleen
- Gopal Divan as Fahwaz
- Dhanish Karthik as Manpreet

== Production ==
The film is based on a true story of Harpreet, director Vibha Gulati's friend, who was murdered at age 25 for falling in love with someone against her family's will. Gulati said that as a woman of a minority group, she found it hard to find investors for the film. Salony Luthra auditioned for the role of an Indian American medical student via Skype when she was in Budapest for an international project. The makers of the film liked her body language but were insistent that she work on her accent. Salony underwent training under Hollywood stuntman Robbie P Smith.

== Reception ==
A critic from Indie Shorts Mag. wrote, "‘Forbidden’ is riveting, moving and above all, thought-provoking". Shewonda Leger, a critic from agnès films and assistant professor at Florida International University, wrote, "Forbidden is a film that is well worth seeing. In just 20 minutes, it questions a long-held cruel practice that has claimed the lives of thousands of women around the world and exemplifies fearless love".

== Awards and nominations ==
Year	Award	Category	Recipient(s)	Result	Ref.
2018	FOG Film Fest	Best of Fest Film	Forbidden	Won	
2020	FFTG Awards	Jury Choice Best Debut Short Film (Family Drama)	Forbidden	Won	
2020	FFTG Awards	Best Director	Vibha Gulati	Won	
2020	FFTG Awards	Best Writer	Vibha Gulati	Won	
2020	FFTG Awards	Best Actor	Gulshan Grover	Won	
