= Sarabham =

2014 Indian film by Arun Mohan

- Theatrical release poster
- Directed by: Arun Mohan
- Written by: Arun Mohan
- Produced by: C. V. Kumar
- Starring: Naveen Chandra; Salony Luthra; Aadukalam Naren
- Cinematography: Krishnan Vasant
- Edited by: Leo John Paul
- Music by: Britto Michael
- Production company: Thirukumaran Entertainment
- Distributed by: Abi TCS Studios; Dream Factory
- Release date: 1 August 2014
- Running time: 137 minutes
- Country: India
- Language: Tamil

Sarabham (transl. Lion Bird; lit. 'Sharabha') is a 2014 Indian Tamil-language neo-noir mystery thriller film directed by Arun Mohan and produced by C. V. Kumar under his banner Thirukumaran Entertainment. The film features Naveen Chandra, Salony Luthra, and Aadukalam Naren. The music was composed by Britto Michael with cinematography by Krishnan Vasant and editing by Leo John Paul. The film was released on 1 August 2014. It is an uncredited remake of the 2003 Japanese thriller Game, which was based on a Keigo Higashino novel.

== Plot ==
Vikram is a young project manager at an architecture firm in Chennai. Though he leads an honest life, he maintains that it is not wrong to do something illegal for money as long as he does not get caught. One day, he goes to his firm's biggest client, Chandrasekar to present an ambitious theme park project plan that he had been preparing for months. It is then that Vikram and his colleague see Chandrasekar's rebellious daughter enter the office to demand money, embarrassing him in front of everyone. Having lost his composure, Chandrasekar coldly rejects Vikram's plan. Vikram gets drunk and then goes to Chandrasekar's beach house to vandalise it. There, he sees Chandrasekar's daughter running away. Vikram follows her to a nearby hotel and confronts her about her father's behaviour.

The woman introduces herself as Shruti and reveals that she dislikes her father just as much as Vikram does because he is a materialistic corporate man. Shruti follows Vikram home, where she proposes that he pretend to abduct her in order to extort a ransom from Chandrasekar. Vikram initially refuses. However, he learns from his superior at work the next day that Chandrasekar had a change of heart and has approved his theme park plan on the condition that the firm has a more experienced project manager head the project. Vikram becomes ever more furious when his archenemy at the firm is chosen to lead the project and finally agrees to Shruti's plan. Together, Vikram and Shruti easily extort all the black money that Chandrasekar has been hiding away from the income tax department. He then sends Shruti back home safely while promising to keep her share of the money for her while she prepares her passport and visa to run away to Australia.

The next day, Vikram learns from the news that a young girl's body resembling Chandrasekar's daughter has been found washed up at the beach. As Vikram panics, Chandrasekar and Shruti walk into his apartment. Chandrasekar then reveals that the rebellious daughter Vikram saw the other day at his office was actually Shruti's twin Sanjana (Salony Luthra). Shruti accidentally killed Sanjana while trying to stop the latter from taking drugs. That was when she ran away from home and ended up with Vikram. Her father then calls her up and forces her to help him frame Vikram instead. This was why Chandrasekar approved Vikram's plan out of the blue and then had another project manager hired to further provoke him to have revenge. Chandrasekar then takes back his ransom money in return for not having Vikram arrested by the police for Sanjana's so-called kidnapping and murder.

Furious that he has been played, Vikram decides to actually kidnap Shruti for the money. He sees her leaving her father's beach house and takes her away forcefully. He has Chandrasekar bring his money to a warehouse in exchange for Shruti. At the warehouse, Chandrasekar brings a gang along for protection and Vikram has to fight them off. However, it is revealed that Shruti is actually Sanjana all along, and it was Shruti who was killed during their struggle. Knowing that their father would not support her, she pretended to be Shruti all along and had the real Shruti's body look like her instead. Seeing that her father never loved her and was instead happy she had died, she kills him in cold blood and splits the ransom money with Vikram. Sanjana then continues pretending to be Shruti and explains to the police that it was her own father who kidnapped and killed his drug addict daughter with the help of the gang to save his reputation. The gang then goes into hiding for a crime they did not commit. Meanwhile, Sanjana takes over Chandrasekar's company and hires Vikram as the project leader.

== Cast ==
- Naveen Chandra as Vikram
- Salony Luthra as Shruti Chandrasekar and Sanjana Chandrasekar
- Aadukalam Naren as Chandrasekar
- Kadhal Kannan as Sreenivasan
- Boys Rajan as Swaminathan, Vikram's boss
- Shankar Narayanan as Kumar
- Thilak as Thilak
- Sam Anton as Vikram's coworker
- Sakthi as Santhosh
- Sai Dheena as Sekhar
- R. Ganesan as Assistant Commissioner

== Production ==
=== Development ===
Sarabham is the directorial debut of Arun Mohan, son of actor Anu Mohan. He met producer C. V. Kumar through editor Leo John Paul; Kumar agreed to finance the film after being impressed with the script. The film's title is a reference to Sharabha, a creature in Hindu mythology that is half lion and half bird. The makers initially wanted to title the film as Yaali – referencing an identical creature – but it was registered by another party which refused to grant the title. Cinematography was handled by Krishnan Vasant and editing by Leo John Paul.

=== Casting ===
Naveen Chandra was cast as the lead actor after Arun Mohan was impressed with his performance in the Telugu film Andala Rakshasi (2012). Salony Luthra, then a Delhi-based theatre actress, made her debut in Tamil cinema; she was cast after an audition from almost a hundred artistes. In contrast to the difficulties faced in casting the lead actress, Aadukalam Naren "agreed immediately" to act in the film after finding the script "interesting".

=== Filming ===
Filming began two days after Kumar greenlit the project. Chandra's first shot depicting his character being hung upside wearing only boxers and being tortured by police took two hours to film; some of the torture was real. For another scene where the character hangs upside down from a 15-floor building, Chandra refused to use a body double. Luthra said she chose to completely immerse herself into her character for the film and be "mentally disconnected" from her Mumbai lifestyle, noting that although becoming the character was "difficult", it was nonetheless a "fantastic" experience. Although a non-smoker, she smoked per the script requirements but said that it was not meant to endorse smoking.

The film was completed in 29 days, one day ahead of schedule, with the team working five days straight without sleep. Criticised for apparently overworking the cast and crew during that period, Kumar responded that, after some filming at a house in Velachery, they were suddenly asked by authorities to stop further filming, but Kumar refused their orders as filming elsewhere would cause continuity issues. Kumar said the authorities eventually agreed to let them film in that house for only five more days, and the crew voluntarily worked continuously to meet the deadline. Because the film was to be shot with live sound, Luthra tried learning Tamil beforehand and her dialogues in the Tamil script were converted to Devanagari. Digital intermediate work was completed in June 2014.

== Soundtrack ==
The music was composed by Britto Michael. The audio was launched on 18 June 2024. Karthik of Milliblog wrote, "Exc[e]pt the first song, the rest of Sarabham is disappointingly out of sync with Think Music's usual standard".

Track listing
No.	Title	Singer(s)	Length
1.	"Pudhidhai Oru Iravu"	Andrea Jeremiah
2.	"Bodhayil Pathai Marum"	Anthony Daasan
3.	"Neram"	Usha Uthup
4.	"Sarabham" (Theme Music)	Rabbit Mic
5.	"Pudhidhai Oru Iravu" (instrumental)	–

== Release and reception ==
Sarabham was released on 1 August 2014. Baradwaj Rangan, writing for The Hindu described the film as "a good story, but what about the rest?". S. Saraswathi of Rediff.com noted that "The film does not get boring, but the thrill element is definitely missing", praising the debutant director; while Sify wrote, "Sarabham is a perfect weekend watch", highlighting Luthra's performance as "long-lasting".
