= Tanpura =

Indian drone instrument

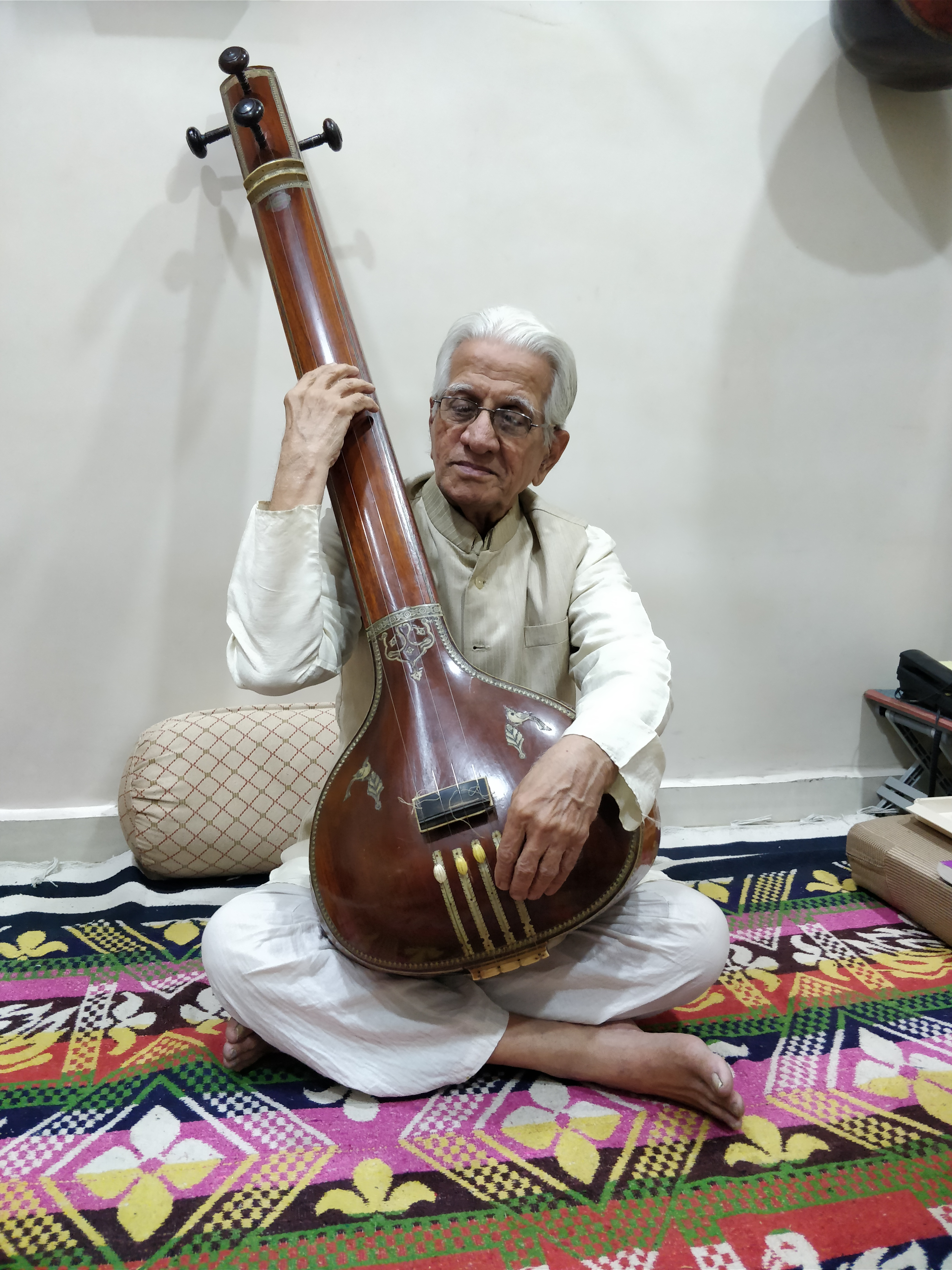
- Pandit with tanpura
- Other names: tambura; tanpuri; tamboura; tanpoura
- Classification: Stringed instrument
- Hornbostel–Sachs classification: 321.321 (Necked bowl lutes)
- Developed: ~300 BCE
- Ninnu Koriyunnanura Mohanam raga, set to adi tala. Composed by Poochi Srinivasa Iyengar, performed by Ramakrishnan Murthy.

The tanpura (Sanskrit: तंबूरा, romanized: taṃbūrā or तानपूरा (tānpūrā); also referred to as tambura, tanpuri, tamboura, or tanpoura) is a long-necked, plucked, four-stringed instrument originating in the Indian subcontinent, found in various forms in Indian music. Visually, the tanpura resembles a simplified sitar or similar lute-like instrument, and is likewise crafted out of a gourd or pumpkin.

The tanpura is not used to play a melody, but to support and sustain the performance of another musician or vocalist, as well as musicians accompanying a dance performance. The instrument's four strings are tuned to specific notes of a given scale or musical key, normally the fifth (Pa; Solfège, “So”) and the root tonic (Sa; “Do”), creating a drone effect. The strings are generally tuned 5-8-8-1. One of the three strings tuned to the tonic is thus an octave below the others, adding greater resonance and depth to the ambient drone.

== History ==
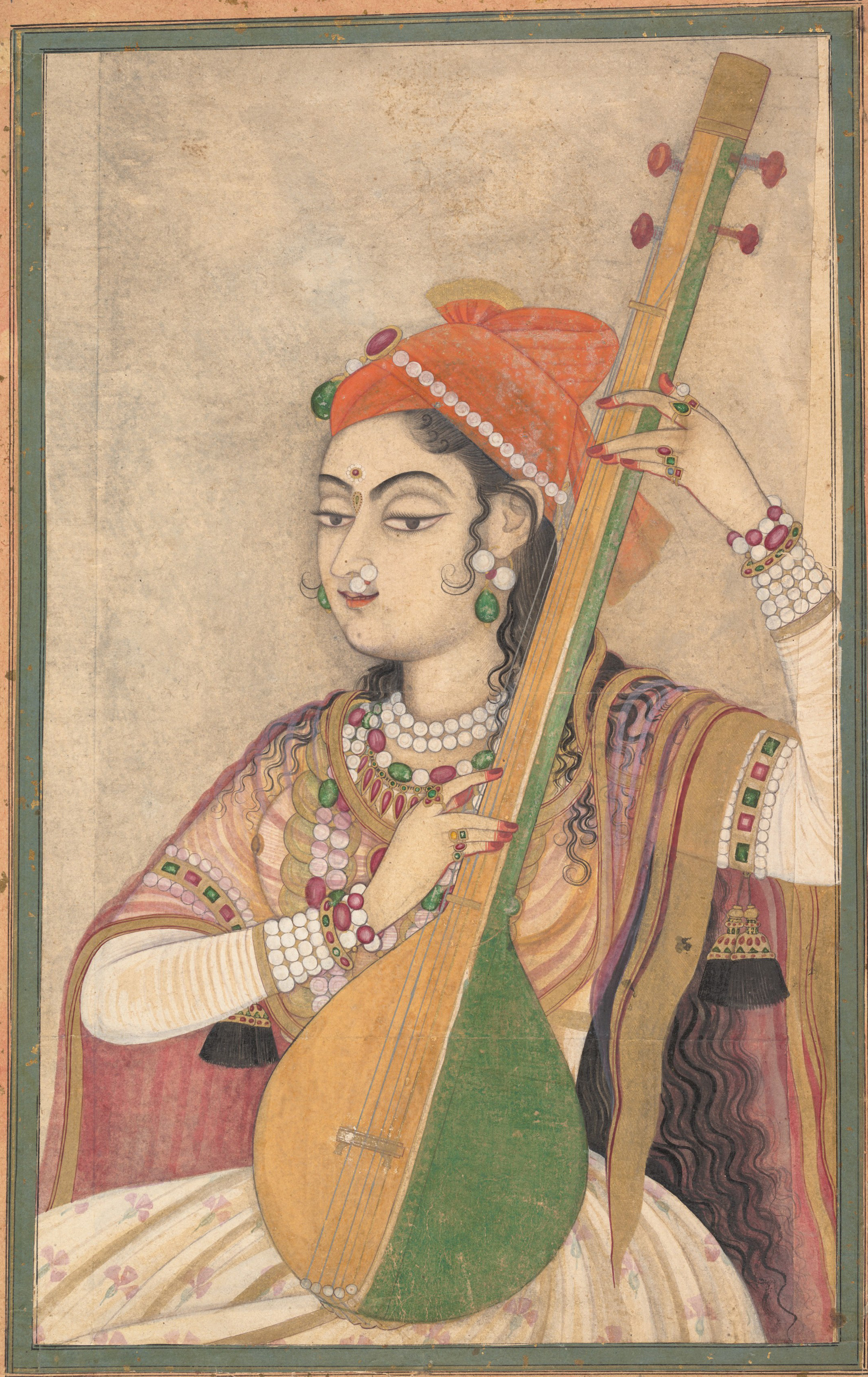
A woman playing the tanpura, ca. 1735

The Tanpura (or in ancient times called the Tumburu Vina) dates back to approximately 300 B.C. The roots of the instrument are apparent in the Nāṭyaśāstra by Bharata Muni (~200 BCE–200 CE), where drone-based accompaniment is described (though not named Tanpura). References in Sangita Ratnakara (13th century CE) by Sharngadeva also suggest instruments of similar function and structure.

The modern and most current form of the tanpura is depicted from around the 16-17th centuries. The term "Tanapura" is derived from Sanskrit words ‘Taana' which means musical phrase and ‘Pura’ means full; and its closest descendant is the ancient Veena, specifically the Tritantri Veena, also from the Indian subcontinent. Early Mughal paintings during this time illustrated scenes of a tambur player.

Additional evidence of the instrument was seen from the middle of the 17th century. Some portrayals showed a completely wooden, fretless tanpura (Tanjore style), and others shown as a wooden tanpura with a gourd (tumba). These illustrations revealed many different varieties of the instrument.

Tanpuras form the root of the ensemble and indeed of the music itself, as the tanpura creates an acoustic dynamic reference chord from which the ragas (melodic modes) are anchored.

=== Tanpura makers ===
The sitar maker family of Miraj is regarded as the finest producers of tanpuras in the world. The family has been making tanpuras for over seven generations from 1850. The signature of the Miraj tanpura is the shell of a bottle gourd that is used for the body of the tanpura. This gourd is specifically grown for the purpose of instrument making and must be hung and dried for one year. The other components of the instrument are carved from wood. The entire process to construct one tanpura takes approximately three weeks.

== Construction ==
The body shape of the tanpura somewhat resembles that of the sitar, but it has no frets – as the strings are always plucked at their full lengths. The Tanpura is different from other string instruments as it does not have any frets or a fretboard. The tanpura is composed of four main parts: tumba, gulu (neck joint), tagli (sound board), dand (neck).

The tumba is first dried, soaked in water, and cleaned allowing the outside of the tumba to become like an elastic or rubber. The other components of the instrument such as the tagli and dand are carved from wood that is seasoned for 3 years to ensure its best quality. Decorations on the tanpura are carved onto the instrument. These carvings previously made with ivory, are now made with a white plastic alternative due to India’s ban on Ivory. After polishing the instrument using gum copal (a natural resin), the instrument is strung and finely tuned.

=== Bridge and strings ===
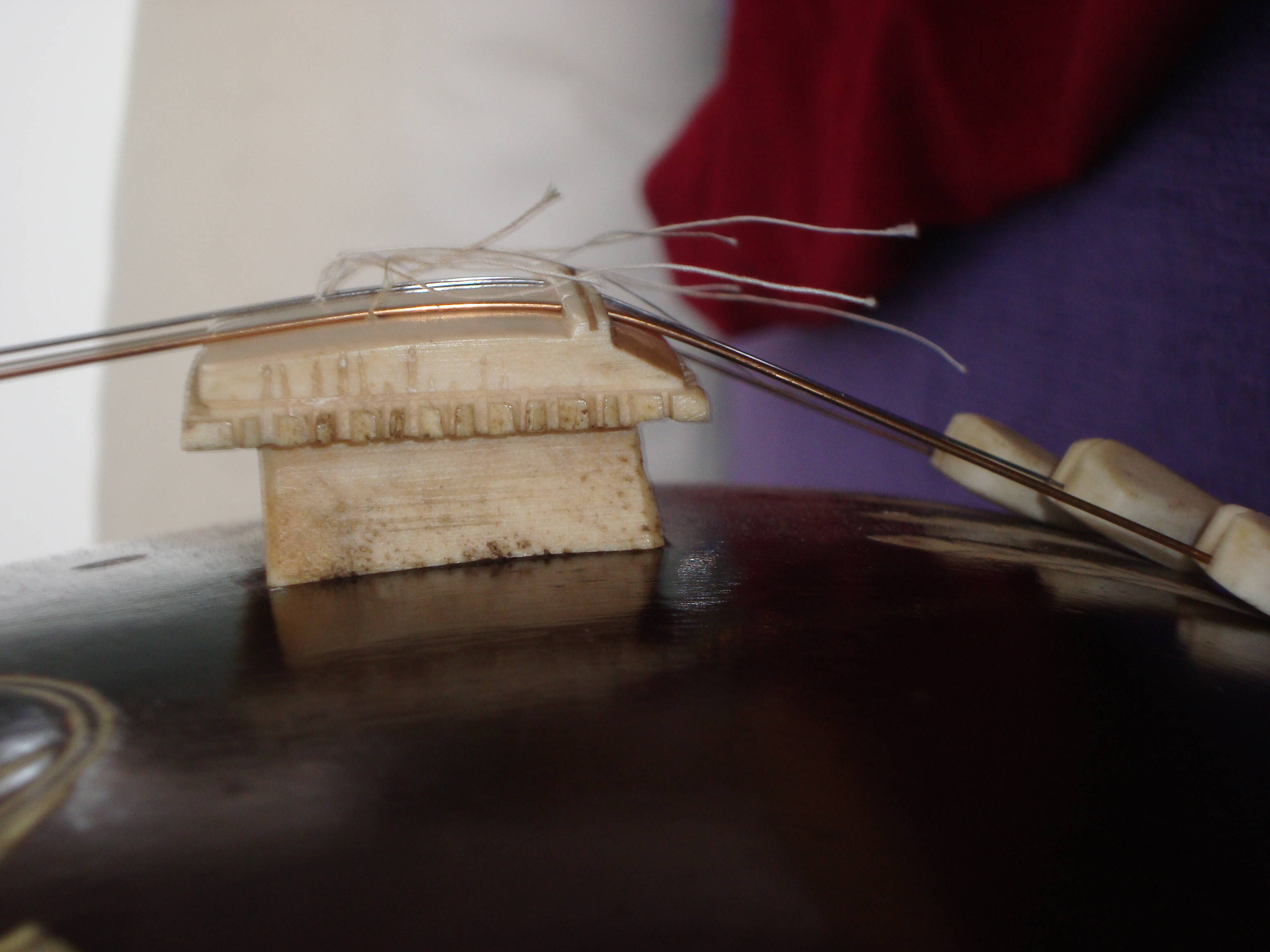
Side view of tanpura bridge

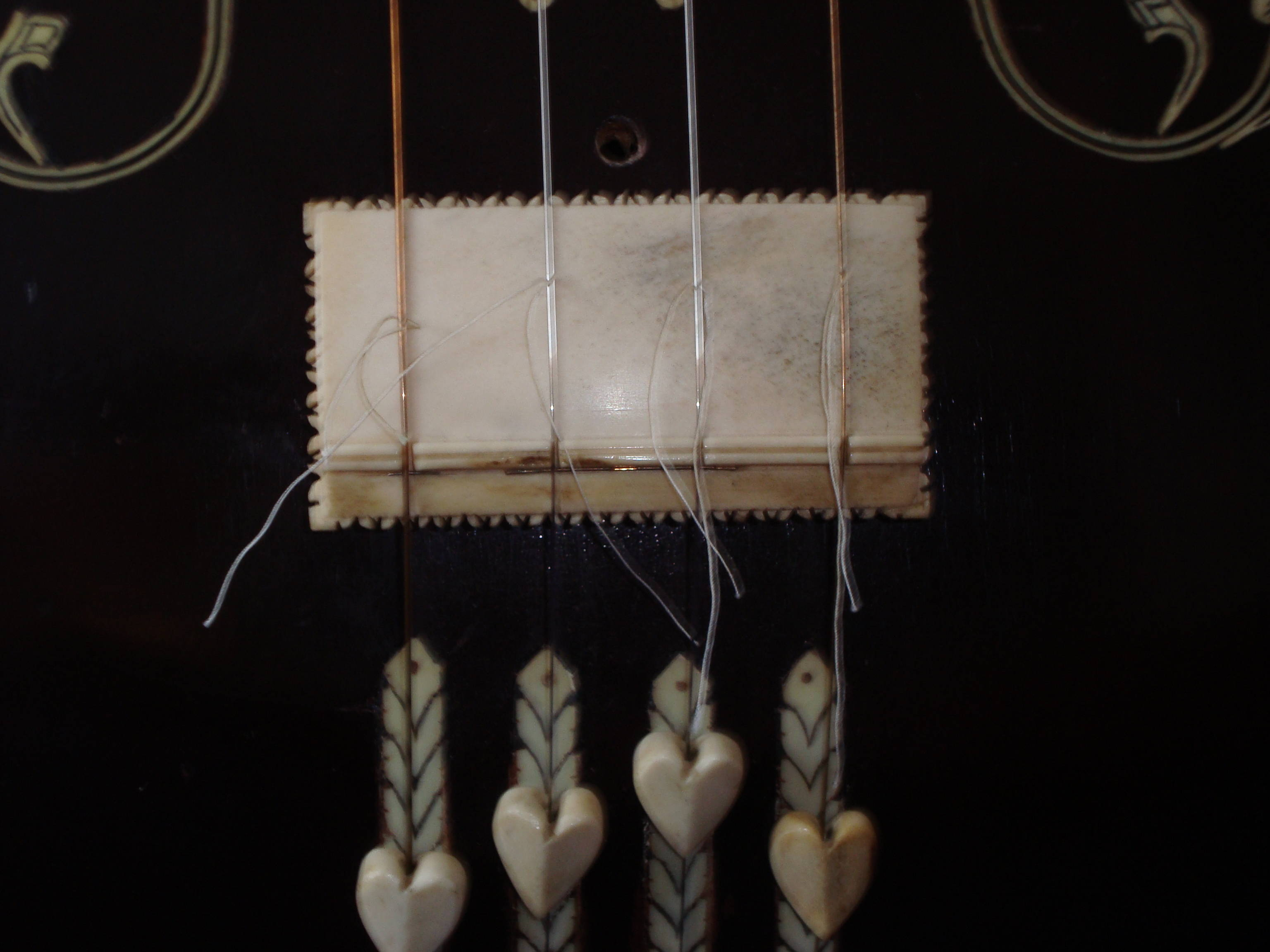
Top view of tanpura bridge

The overtone-rich sound and the audible movement in the inner resonances of tone is achieved by applying the principle of Jivari which creates a sustained "buzzing" sound in which particular harmonics will resonate with focused clarity. To achieve this effect, the strings pass over a table-shaped, curved-top bridge, the front of which slopes gently away from the surface of the strings. When a string is plucked, it has an intermittent periodical grazing contact with the bridge. When the string moves up and down, the downward wave will touch a far point on the curve of the bridge, and as the energy of motion of the string gradually diminishes, these points of contact of the string on the bridge will gradually shift as well, being a compound function of amplitude, the curvature of the bridge, pitch, string tension and time. When the string is plucked, it has a large amplitude. As the energy of the string's movement gradually diminishes, the contact point of the string with the bridge slowly creeps up the slope of the bridge. Depending on scale, tension and pitch, this can take between three and ten seconds. The acoustics of the room where the instrument is being played can also affect the resonance of the sound.

This dynamic process can be fine-tuned using a cotton thread between string and bridge: by shifting the thread, the grazing contact sequence is shifted to a different position on the bridge, changing the harmonic content. According to this principle, tanpuras are attentively tuned to achieve a particular tonal shade relative to the tonal characteristics of the raga. These more delicate aspects of tuning are directly related to what Indian musicians call raga Svaroop, which is about how characteristic intonations are important defining aspects of a particular raga.

=== Sizes and tunings ===
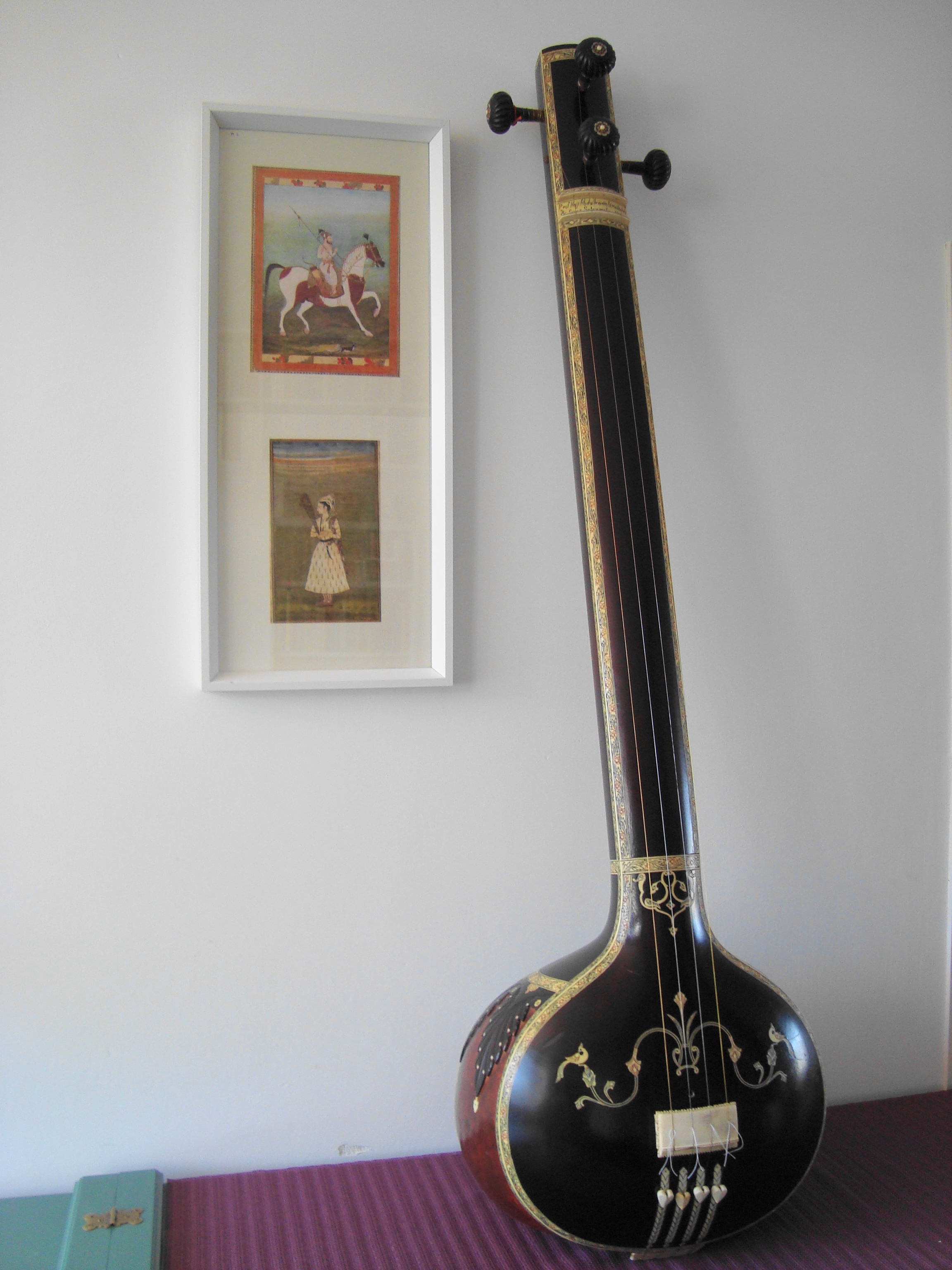
A male-pitched tanpura

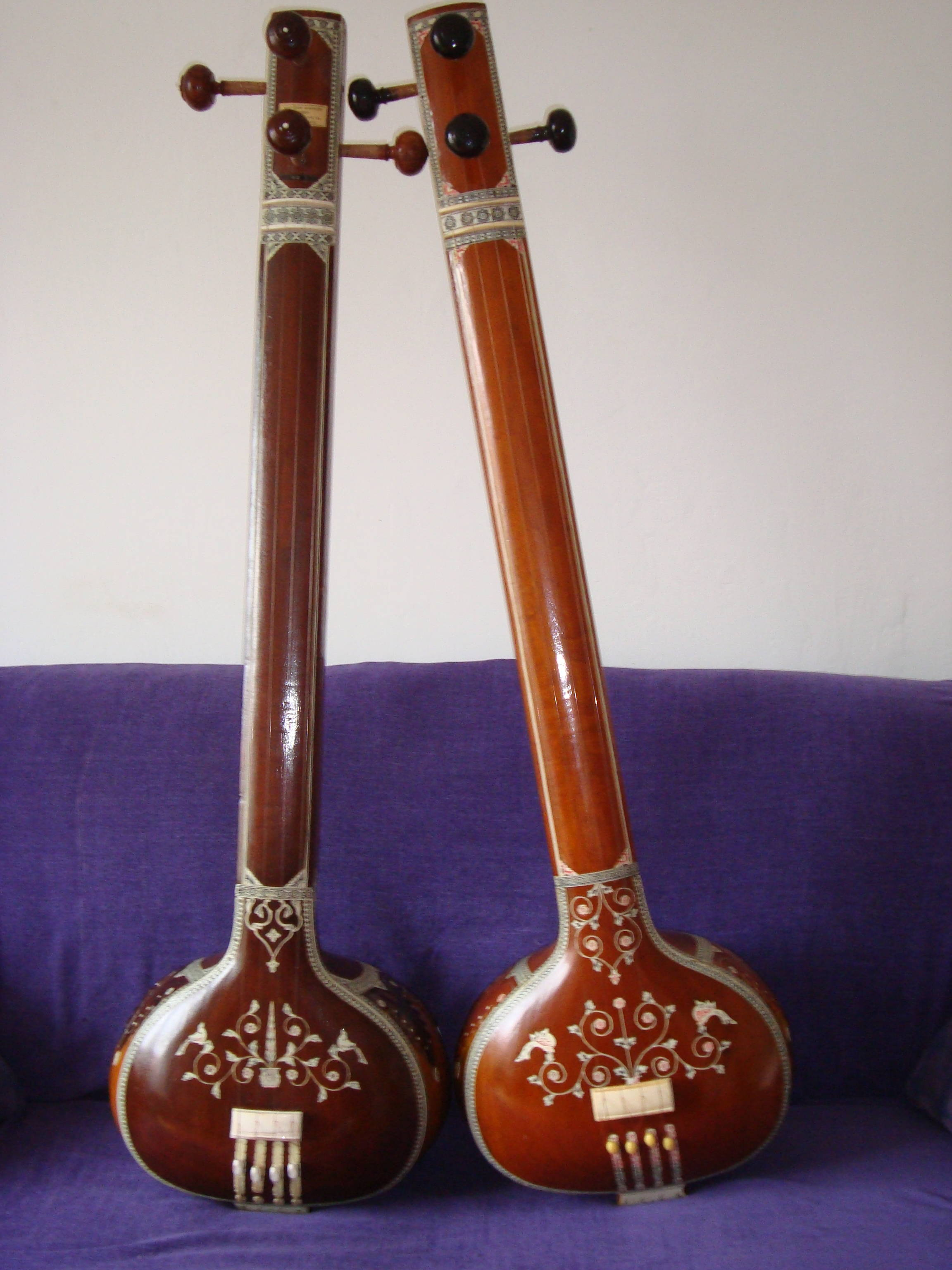
A pair of female-pitched tanpuras

Tanpuras come in different sizes and pitches: larger "males", smaller "females" for vocalists.

Male vocalists use the biggest instruments and pitch their tonic note (Sa), often at D, C♯ or lower, some go down to B-flat; female singers usually a fifth higher, though these tonic notes may vary according to the preference of the singer, as there is no absolute and fixed pitch-reference in the Indian Classical music systems. A female singer may take her 'sa' at F, another at A.

The male tanpura has an open string length of approximately one metre; the female is three-fourths of the male. The standard tuning is 5-8-8-1 (so do′ do′ do) or, in Indian sargam, Pa-sa-sa-Sa. For ragas that omit the fifth tone, pa, the first string is tuned down to the natural fourth: 4-8-8-1 or Ma-sa-sa-Sa. Some ragas that omit Pa and shuddha Ma, such as Marwa or Hindol, require a less common tuning with shuddha Dha (major 6th), DHA-sa-sa-SA or 6-8-8-1, or with the 7th, NI-s-s-S. With a five-string instrument, the seventh or NI (major or minor 7th) can be added: PA-NI-sa-sa-SA (5-7-8-8-1)or MA-NI-sa-sa-SA (4-7-8-8-1). Both minor and major 7th harmonics are clearly distinguishable in the harmonic texture of the overall sound, so when the Ni - strings are tuned into these harmonics, the resultant sound will be perfectly harmonious.

Usually the octave strings are in steel wire, and the tonic, 4th or 5th strings in brass or bronze wire. If a string will be tuned to the 6th or 7th, a steel string is advised instead.

=== Variants ===
Tanpuras are designed in two different styles:

- Miraj style: the favorite form of tanpura for Hindustani performers. It is usually between three and five feet in length, with a carved, rounded soundboard (tabli) and a long, hollow straight neck, in section resembling a rounded capital D. The round lower chamber to which the tabli, the connecting heel-piece and the neck (dandh) are fixed is cut from a selected and dried gourd (tumba). Wood used is either tun or teak; bridges are usually cut from one piece of bone.
- Tanjore style: this is a south Indian style of tambura, used widely by Carnatic performers. It has a somewhat different shape and style of decoration from that of the Miraj, but is otherwise much the same size. Typically, no gourd is used, but the spherical part is gouged out of a solid block of wood. The neck is somewhat smaller in diameter. Jack wood is used throughout; bridges are usually cut from one piece of rosewood. Often, two rosettes are drilled out and ornamented with inlay work.

==== Electronic vs. Traditional Tanpura ====
An electronic tanpura, also referred as shruti box, is a small box that imitates the sound of a tanpura, is sometimes used in contemporary Indian classical music performances instead of a tanpura, though this practice is controversial.

The use of electronic tanpuras has sparked conversation among musicians and manufacturers, with differing views on the tanpura's impact in performance and trandition. Supporters of electronic versions state the lack of tanpura players, convenience, and high costs of the instrument as reasons for the shift to electronic alternatives. A traditional tanpura can cost approximately three times more than an electronic tanpura. App versions, such as Tanpura Droid and iTanpura Lite, KalaSudha Tanpura, free browser-based tanpura with adjustable pitch and string tuning, are other commonly used alternatives due to accessibility and convenience.

Others argue electronic versions fail to emulate subtle imperfections and resonance of a traditional tanpura. Additionally, electronic versions have reduced opportunities for students to accompany their gurus (teachers) in performance or concert settings. This tradition is a long-standing practice in the gurukula system in music. Increased use of electronic versions of the instrument has also been linked to a decline in demand for traditional tanpuras leading to a decline in business amongst manufacturers.

== Sources ==
- Ashok Damodar Ranade (1 January 1990). Keywords and concepts: Hindustani classical music. Promilla. ISBN 978-81-85002-12-5.source for Sangit Parijat is Ahobal Pandit, translated by Kalind-Hatvas, Sangeet Karyalaya 1971
- Wim van der Meer - Joep Bor: De roep van de Kokila, historische en hedendaagse aspekten van de Indiase muziek; Martinus Nijhoff / 's-Gravenhage 1982, ISBN 90 247 9079 4
- Hindustani Music, 13th to 20th centuries, editors: Joep Bor, Françoise Delvoye, Jane Harvey & Emmy te Nijenhuis; Codarts, Manohar 2010
- Nazir Ali Jairazbhoy (1995). The Rāgs of North Indian Music: Their Structure and Evolution. Popular Prakashan. ISBN 978-81-7154-395-3.
- On some Indian string instruments (1921) Sir C V Raman, FRS, M.A., D.Sc. (Hon), Palit Professor of Physics at the University of Calcutta, Nobel Prize, 1930
- Beyond Swayambhu Gandhar: an analysis of perceived tanpura notes. Paritosh K. Pandya. Tata Institute of Fundamental Research, Mumbai
- Audio samples of tanpura of various pitch, Glorian.bandcamp.com
