= Sriram Parasuram =

- Origin: India
- Genres: Carnatic; Hindustani classical music
- Occupation: Singer
- Spouse: Anuradha Sriram

Sriram Parasuram is a cross-genre Hindustani classical vocalist. He also plays the violin.

== Early life ==
He was born in a musical family. He formed a music band "Three Brothers & Violin" along with his siblings and composed for album Savariya – Once Upon A Time the Ohio Beasts Sing and the film Jajantaram Mamantaram.

Parasuram received his Ph.D. in Ethnomusicology from Wesleyan University, where he met Anuradha when she was a masters student.

== Personal life ==
He is married to Carnatic classical vocalist Anuradha Sriram, with whom he gives jugalbandis. They have two sons, named Jayant and Lokesh.
