= Shruti box =

Indian musical instrument

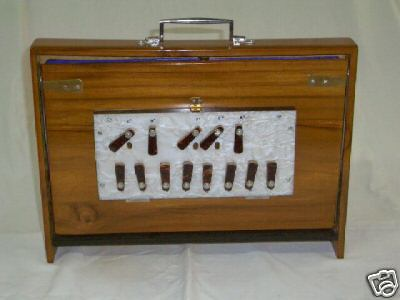
- One side of the shruti box
- Other names: surpeti
- Classification: Reed aerophone
- Hornbostel–Sachs classification: 412.132 (free reed instruments utilizing a bellows system)

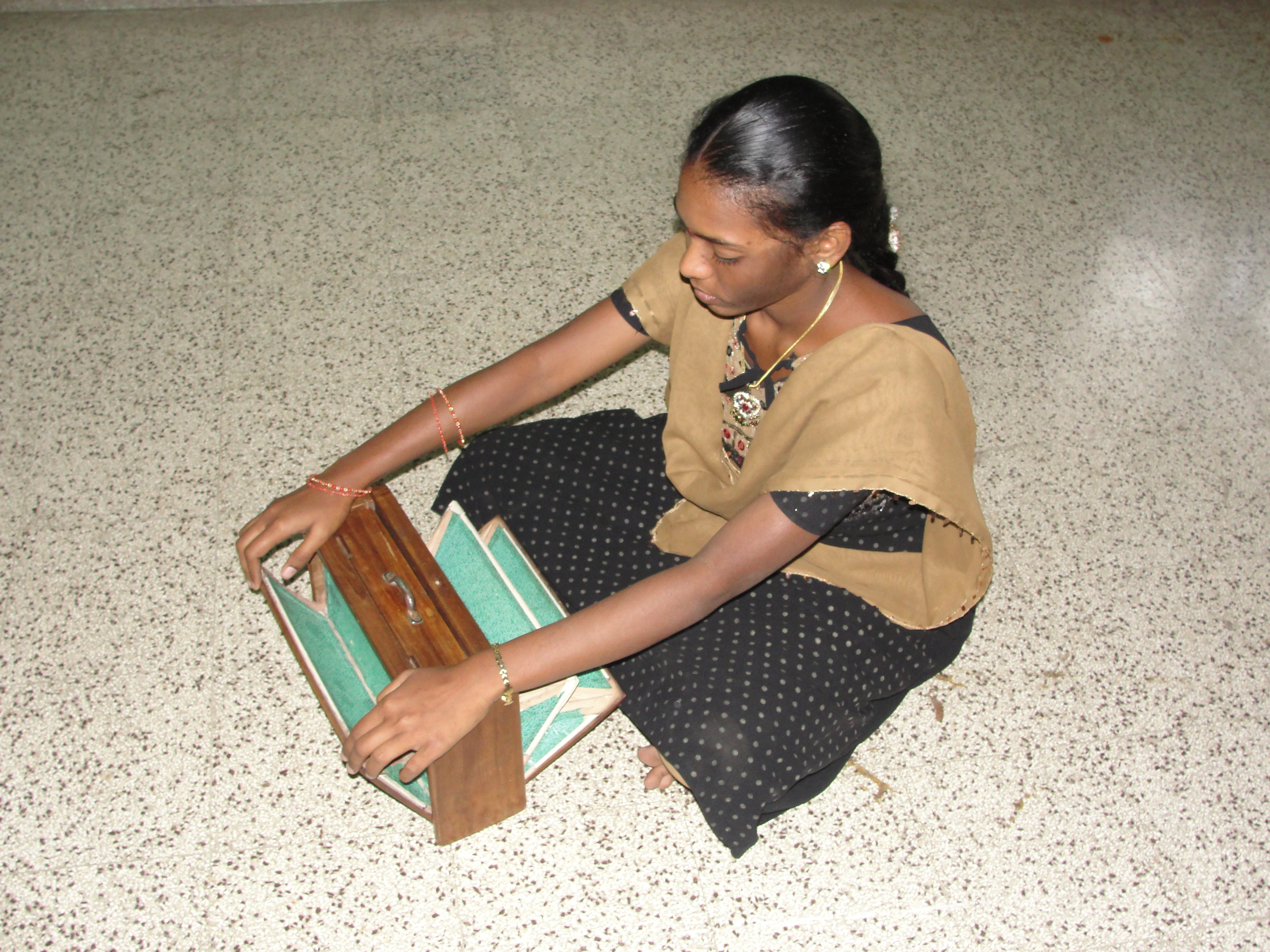
Playing the shruti box

Playing the shruti box

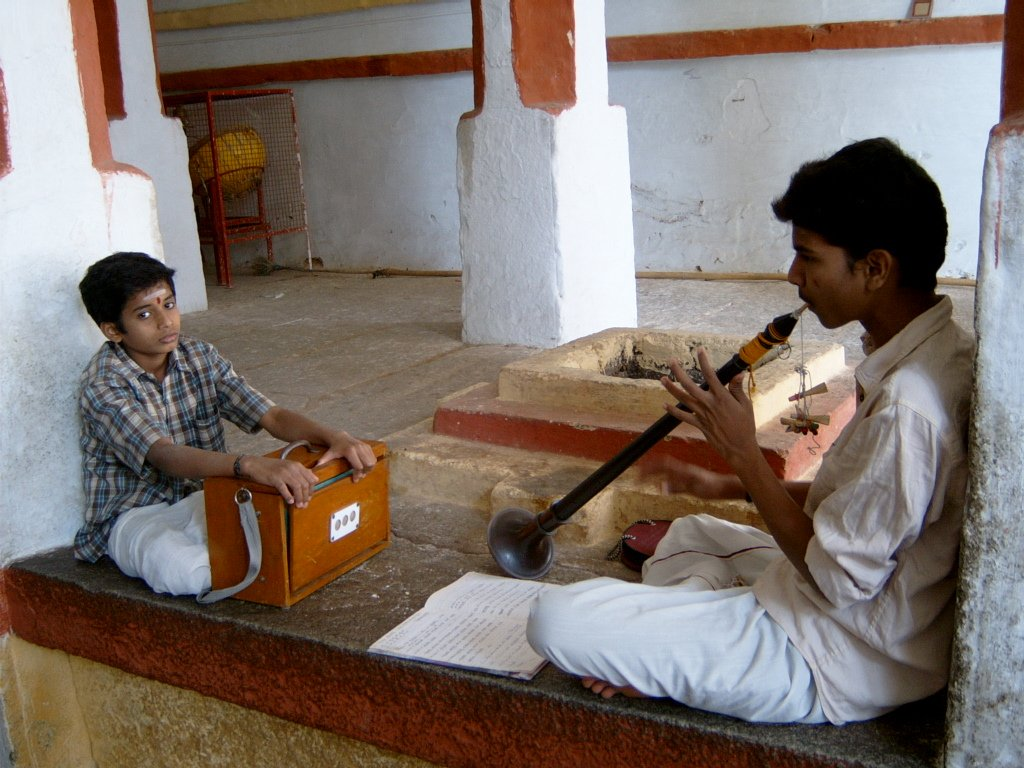
A shruti box and a nadaswaram

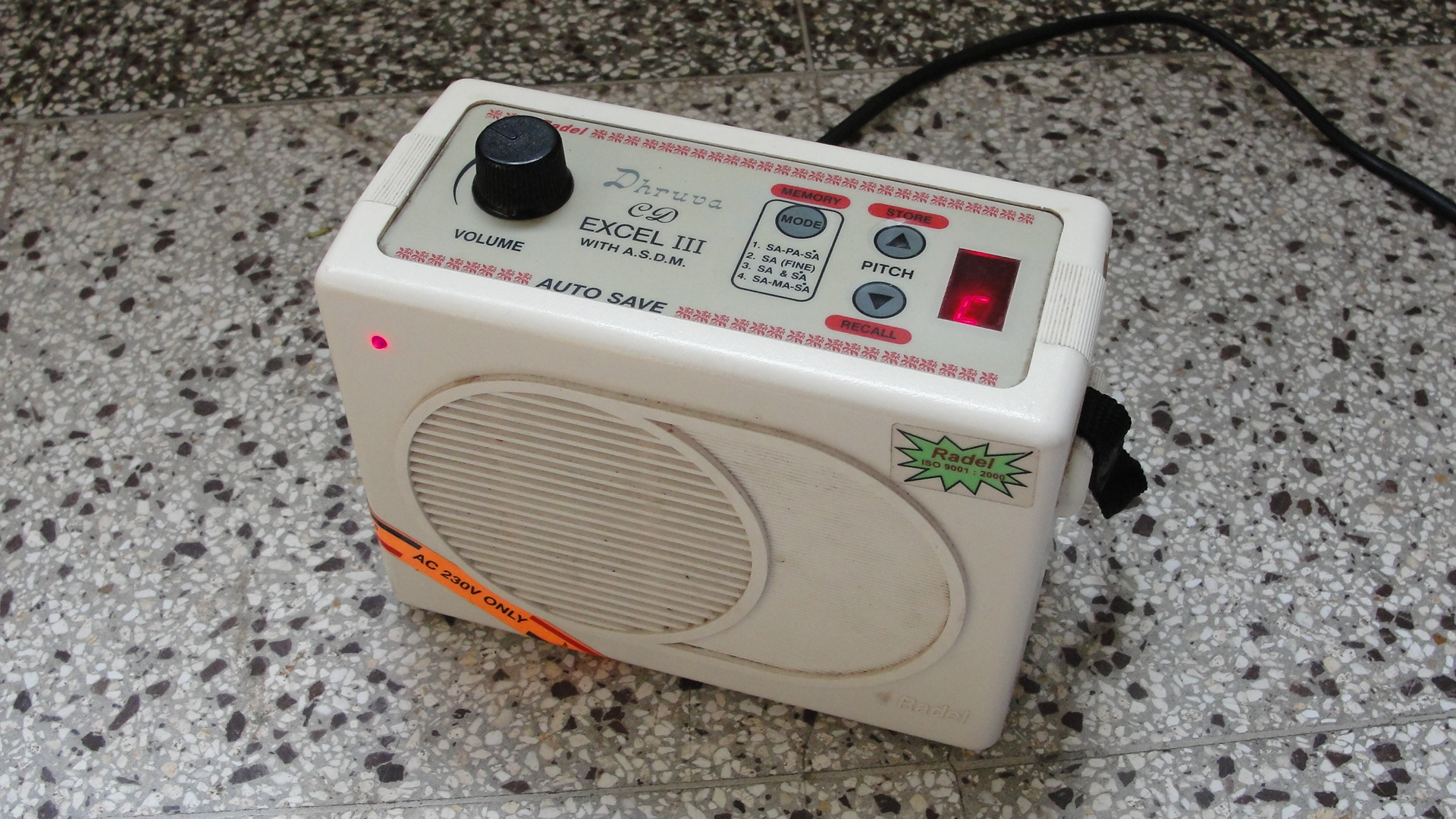
An electronic shruti box

A shruti box (sruti box, shrutibox, srutibox or surpeti) is a musical instrument, originating from the Indian subcontinent, that traditionally works on a system of bellows. It is similar to a harmonium and is used to provide a drone in a practice session or concert of Indian classical music. It is used as an accompaniment to other instruments and notably the flute. The shruti box is also used in classical singing. In classical singing, the shruti box is used to help tune the voice. The use of the shruti box has widened with the cross-cultural influences of world music and new-age music to provide a drone for many other instruments as well as vocalists and mantra singing.

Adjustable buttons allow tuning. Nowadays, electronic shruti boxes are commonly used, which are called shruthi pettige in Kannada, shruti petti in Tamil, Malayalam, and Telugu, and sur peti in Hindi. Recent versions also allow for changes to be made in the tempo, and the notes such as Madhyamam, Nishadam to be played in place of the usual three notes (i.e., lower shadjam, panchamam, and the upper shadjam).

== History ==
Before the arrival of the harmonium in the Indian subcontinent, musicians used either a tambura or a specific pitch reference instrument, such as the nadaswaram, to produce the drone. Some forms of music such as Yakshagana used the pungi reed pipe as a drone. After the Western small pump harmonium became popular, musicians would modify the harmonium to automatically produce the reference pitch. Typically, one would open up the cover and adjust the stop of the harmonium to produce a drone.

Later, a keyless version of the harmonium was invented for the specific purpose of producing the drone sound. It was given the name shruti box or sruti box. These types of instruments had controls on the top or on the side of the box for controlling the pitch.

The shruti box is enjoying a renaissance in the West among traditional and contemporary musicians, who are using it for a range of different styles. In the early nineties, traditional Irish singer Nóirín Ní Riain brought the shruti box to Ireland, giving it a minor place in traditional Irish music. More recently Scottish folk artists Karine Polwart and Julie Fowlis used the instrument on some of their songs. Singers find it very useful as an accompaniment and instrumentalists enjoy the drone reference it gives to play along with.

== See also ==
- Electronic tanpura
- Electronic musical instrument
