= Electronic tanpura =

Musical instrument

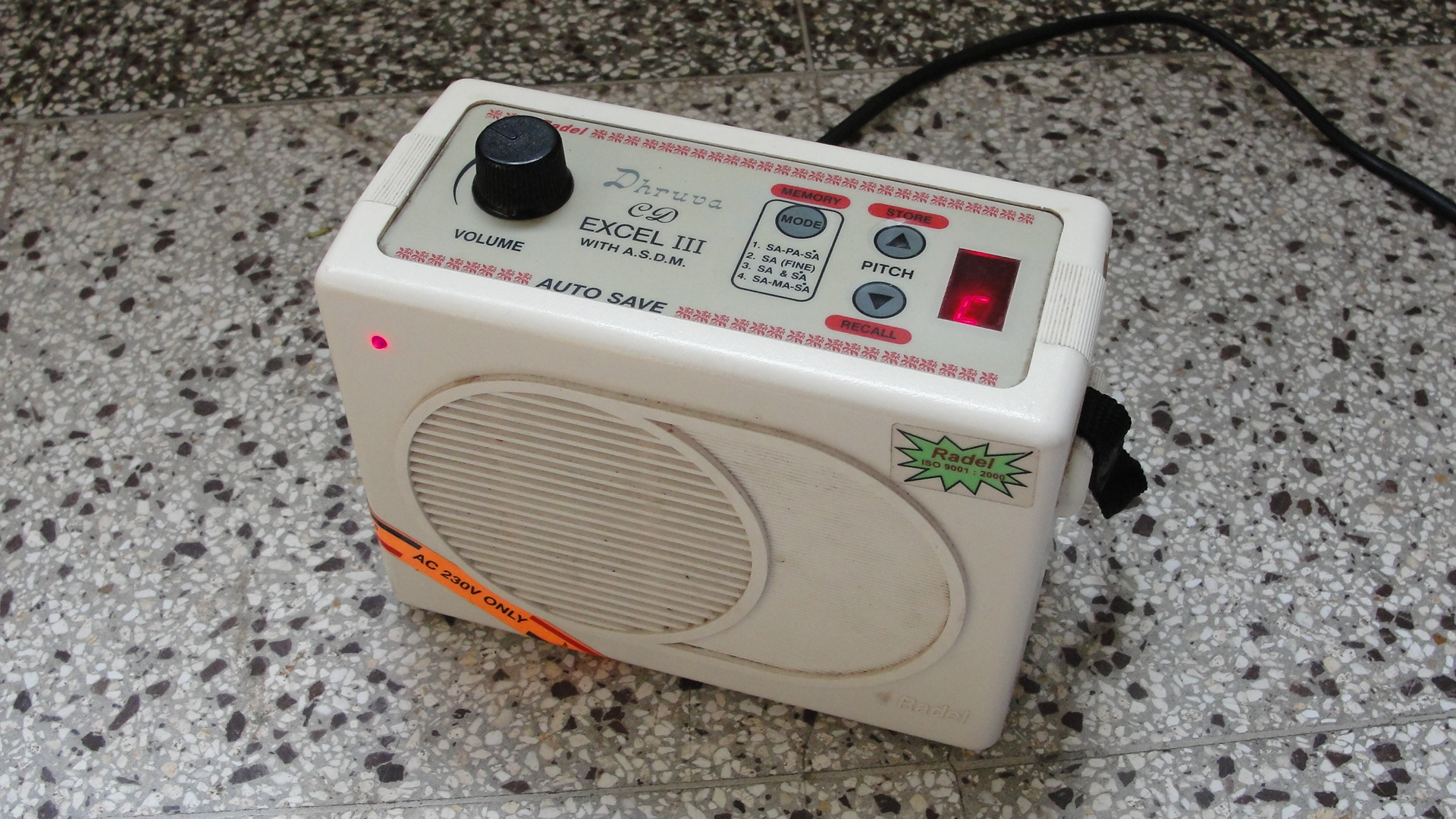
- electronic shruti box
- Hornbostel–Sachs classification: 53 (Electrophones)

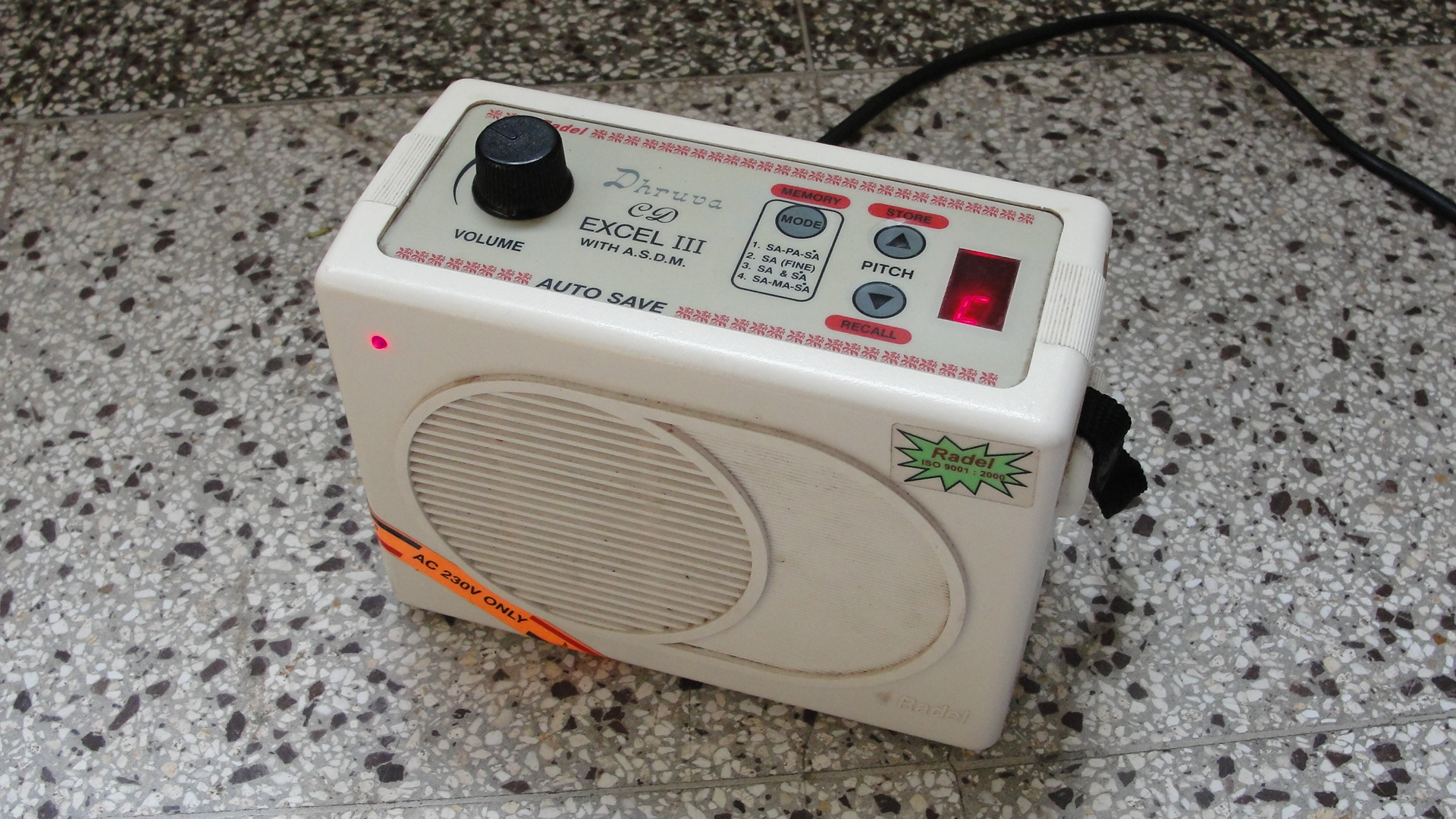
An electronic tanpura

An electronic tanpura is an electronic instrument that replicates the sound of an Indian string instrument known as the tanpura (tambura), used to provide a constant drone to accompany another's vocal or instrumental melody.

== Terminology ==
It may also be called an electronic tambura, electronic shruti box, or simply shruti box. Nowadays it is available in mobile phones.

== Function ==
An electronic tanpura in action. Changing some of the settings shown. However, setup is done before performance. During practice, just like traditional-tanpura, it produces a repeating phrase that help the musician or student to maintain scale.

In Indian music, the drone is a basic function of the music. The development of a raga, any composition or song within raga presupposes and requires the continuous sounding of the key-note, its octave and another tone, usually the fifth or fourth. Traditionally drone is often provided by one or more tanpura player(s), especially for vocal performances.

The electronic tanpura was created as a marketable, practical solution for instrumentalists, having their hands otherwise engaged, who cannot readily avail themselves of able tanpura players for their long hours of private practice. Generally, the electronic tanpura has one or more dials to control the tone and volume, and may have other switches and buttons that allow a certain pitch and volume to be saved and used again at a later time. The range is usually one to two octaves.

== History ==
The electronic tanpura was first invented by Mr. G. Raj Narayan in 1979, an engineer-flautist from Bangalore, India, and demonstrated at the annual conference of the Music Academy Chennai in December that year. The products were manufactured by the company he founded, Radel Electronics. The first versions were created with the technology then available, using discrete components and transistors. In the late 1990s, these gave way to models using sampled recordings of the traditional tanpura on a chip. In the 2000s, tanpura mobile apps began to be produced. In 2016, a mathematical model of a tanpura was developed at the Sonic Arts Research Center of Queen's University Belfast.

== Criticism ==
For many musicians the electronic tanpura is a practical commodity, delivering a passable substitute for a live tanpura. It is easier and less expensive than maintaining a live tanpura player. However, some musicians consider the electronic tanpura a poor substitute when compared to a good tanpura in expert hands, as the tones it creates lack the dynamics of a live musician, producing a mechanical, repetitive sound.

== See also ==
- Shruti box
- Electronic musical instrument
