= Kabilan =

Kabilan is a Tamil given name. Notable people with the name include:

- Kabilan Vairamuthu (born 1982), Tamil writer and activist
- Kabilan (lyricist) (born 1977), Tamil lyricist, poet, and actor
