= Naveen Chandra =

Indian actor

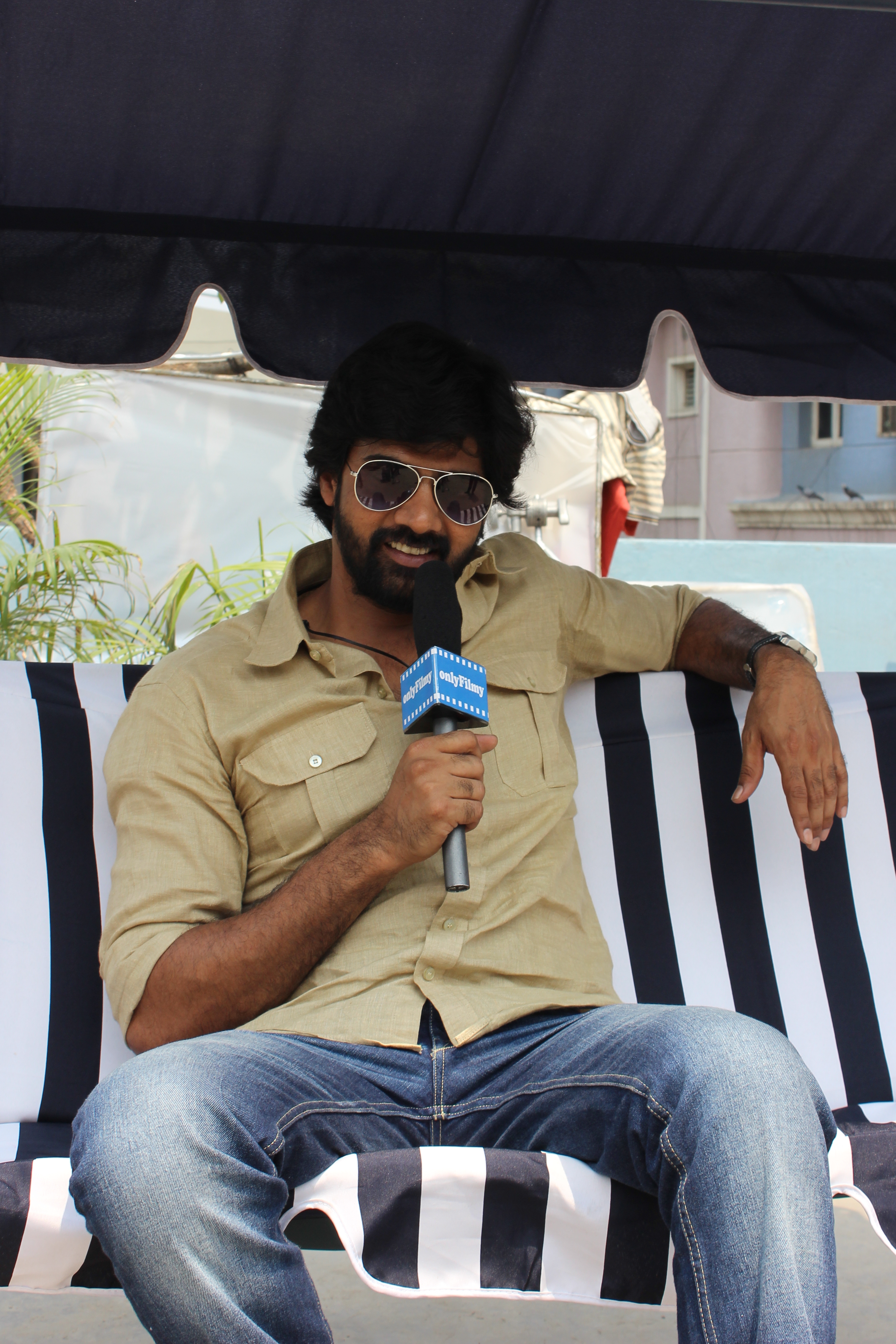
- Naveen during an interview
- Born: 2 December 1988 (age 37); Secunderabad, Andhra Pradesh, India (present-day Telangana)
- Other names: Anji; Pradeep
- Occupation: Actor
- Years active: 2006–present
- Spouse: Orma
- Children: 1

Naveen Chandra (born 2 December 1988) is an Indian actor who works in Telugu and Tamil films. After debuting in Sambhavami Yuge Yuge (2006), he gained recognition for Andala Rakshasi (2012) and continued to appear in both leading and supporting roles. Tripura (2015), Nenu Local (2017), Bhanumathi & Ramakrishna (2020), Jigarthanda DoubleX (2023) and Eleven (2025) are his notable films.

== Early life ==
Naveen Chandra was born into a Tamil-speaking family in Secunderabad, Telangana. Both his parents are Tamilians, with his father being a head mechanic at KSRTC and hails from Bengaluru, Karnataka, while his mother hails from Secunderabad, Telangana. Their family later moved to Ballari, Karnataka, where he was raised. Chandra obtained a diploma in Mechanical Engineering and worked as a multimedia animator before he forayed into films.

== Career ==
Chandra made his debut in Telugu cinema with Sambhavami Yuge Yuge under the stage name Anji in the year 2006, and later acted in the film Kalyanam under the stage name Chandu. Chandra made his debut as a hero in Tamil with Pazhaniappa Kalloori under the stage name Pradeep. His next Tamil film Agarathi never saw a theatrical release. In 2012, he starred in the Telugu film Andala Rakshasi which gained him positive responses from viewers and critics for his performance in his role as Surya. He shot for the Tamil film Therodum Veedhiyile with Payal Ghosh in 2012, which was never released.

In the bilingual film Dalam, Chandra played an ex-naxalite who struggles to return to a normal life. For his role in Sathyashiva's Sivappu, he lived incognito as a labourer in his friend's construction company for two weeks in order to get into his character. The film also released in 2014. He was also signed as the second lead in the Tamil film Brahman. He was signed on for the lead role in producer C. V. Kumar's Sarabham. He next appeared in Miss India starring Keerthy Suresh under the direction of Narendra Nath.

His films Month of Madhu and Jigarthanda DoubleX were released in 2023.

== Personal life ==
Naveen Chandra is married to Orma, a Malayali, with whom he has a son.

== Filmography ==
Year	Title	Role	Language	Notes
2006	Sambhavami Yuge Yuge	Anji	Telugu	credited as Anji
2007	Kalyanam		Telugu	credited as Chandu
2007	Pazhaniappa Kalloori	Parthi	Tamil	credited as Pradeep
2012	Andala Rakshasi	Surya	Telugu	
2013	Dalam	Abhi	Telugu	
2014	Naa Rakumarudu	Vaishnav	Telugu	
2014	Sarabham	Vikram	Tamil	
2014	Bramman	Madankumar	Tamil	
2014	Koottam	Abhi	Tamil	
2015	Bham Bolenath	Krishna	Telugu	
2015	Tripura	Tripura's husband	Telugu	
2015	Sivappu	Pandian	Tamil	
2016	Lacchimdeviki O Lekkundi	Naveen	Telugu	
2016	Meelo Evaru Koteeswarudu	Prashanth	Telugu	
2017	Nenu Local	Siddharth Varma	Telugu	
2017	Juliet Lover of Idiot	Vara	Telugu	
2018	Devadas	Ajay	Telugu	
2018	Aravinda Sametha Veera Raghava	Bala Reddy	Telugu	
2019	Evaru	DSP Ashok Krishna	Telugu	
2020	Bhanumathi & Ramakrishna	Ramakrishna	Telugu	
2020	Miss India	Vijay Anand	Telugu	
2020	Pattas	Nilapparai "Nilan"	Tamil	
2021	Super Over	Kaasi	Telugu	
2021	Mosagallu	Sid	Telugu	
2021	Ardha Shathabdham	Ranjith	Telugu	
2021	Mission 2020	ACP Jayanth	Telugu	
2021	Bro	Madhav	Telugu	
2021	1997		Telugu	
2021	Nenu Leni Naa Prema Katha		Telugu	
2022	Ghani	Aadi	Telugu	
2022	Virata Parvam	Raghu	Telugu	
2022	Ranga Ranga Vaibhavanga	Arjun Prasad	Telugu	
2022	Ammu	Ravi	Telugu	
2022	Thaggedele	Eshwar	Telugu	
2022	Repeat	Vikram	Telugu	
2023	Veera Simha Reddy	Shekhar Reddy	Telugu	
2023	Mayagadu	Ravi	Telugu	
2023	Month of Madhu	Madhusudhan Rao	Telugu	
2023	Jigarthanda DoubleX	DSP Rathna Kumar	Tamil	
2024	Satyabhama	Amarendar	Telugu	
2025	Game Changer	"Sand" Simha	Telugu	
2025	28 Degree Celsius	Karthik	Telugu	
2025	Blind Spot	Vikram	Telugu	
2025	Eleven	ACP Aravindan (Benjamin)	Tamil; Telugu	Bilingual film
2025	Show Time	Surya	Telugu	
2025	Mass Jathara	Sivudu	Telugu	
2025	Mark	Bhadra	Kannada	
2026	Honey	Anand	Telugu	
2026	Neelira	Captain	Tamil	
2026	Police Complaint		Telugu	

=== Television ===
Year	Title	Role	Network	Language	Ref.
2021–present	Parampara	Gopi	Disney+ Hotstar	Telugu	
2024	Inspector Rishi	Rishi	Amazon Prime Video	Tamil	
2024	Snakes and Ladders	Leonard "Leo"	Amazon Prime Video	Tamil	
