= Sreya Jayadeep =

Indian singer

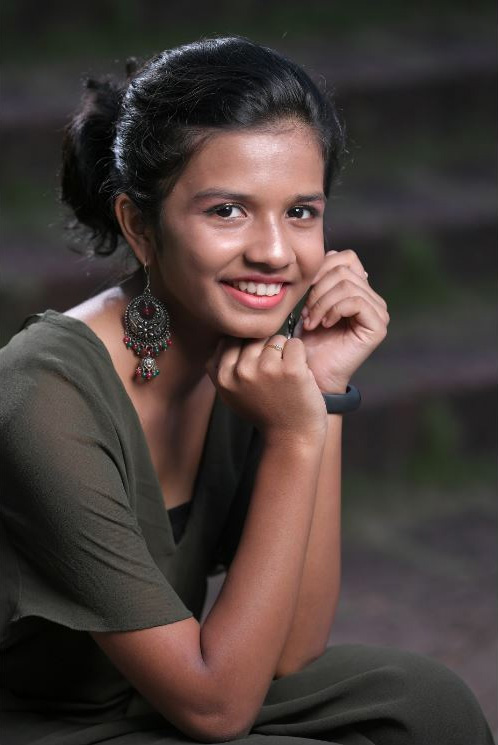

Background information
- Born: 5 November 2005 (age 20); Kozhikode, Kerala, India
- Occupation: Playback singer
- Years active: 2013 – present

Sreya Jayadeep (born 5 November 2005) is an Indian singer. She has sung on music albums and films in South Indian languages. She has appeared on reality shows.

By age fourteen, she had recorded more than 60+ films, along with 200 devotional and 70 general albums. Her first commercial song was the Christian devotional album Hitham; she later released Sreyam. Sreya began music lessons at age three. Her teacher in classical music was Thamarakkad Krishnan Namboodiri, and playback singer Sathish Babu trained her in different genres of music. She attended Silver Hills Higher Secondary School. As of 2020 she was in tenth grade at Devagiri CMI Public School. Sreya has been touring around the world to Europe, including Britain, and been to USA, UAE, Qatar, Saudi Arabia and Australia.

== Career ==
Sreya was crowned the Surya TV ‘Surya Singer – 2013’ (Malayalam) title at age 8 followed by Sun TV ‘Sun Singer – 2014 (Tamil)’. Her debut as a playback singer was in the Malayalam film Weeping Boy in 2013 with two songs, "Chema Chema Chemanoru" and "Thaaraattupaattum". Her song "Mele Manathe Eashoye" from the Christian devotional album ‘God’ under the direction of music stalwart Composer Sri. M. Jayachandran was viewed more than 11 million times. This song made her popular. Subsequently, she received a lot of film offers and worked in Malayalam films. Her song "Enno Njan Ente" from the film Amar Akbar Anthony (2015) was well received.

In 2016, she sang "Minungum Minnaminuge" in Oppam which earned more than 70 million views in YouTube. She worked with almost all the leading music directors and has worked in Tamil, Telugu, and Kannada films. Sreya's Tamil song based on the biography Wings of Dreams depicted the life of Dr. A. P. J. Abdul Kalam. She is part of Kerala Government's ‘Harithasree Project’ an environmental action initiative, Water Conservation Project by Mathrubhumi and Rubella Vaccine campaign by National Health Mission. In 2022, she replaced Baby Meenakshi as the lead Host of popular reality show Flowers Top singer season 3.

Sreya Jayadeep has an alto-soprano vocal range and can sing at a speed of 600+ beats per minute, according to her live performance on YouTube in Flower's Top Singer. She sang a K. S. Chithra song, which plead the audio with applause. She can play a little bit of keyboard and guitar.

== Awards ==
| Year | Award | Category | Film / Serial | Song |
|---|---|---|---|---|
| 2013 | Surya Singer | —N/a | —N/a | —N/a |
| 2014 | Sun Singer | —N/a | —N/a | —N/a |
| 2015 | Kerala State Film Awards | Special Mention | Amar Akbar Antony | "Enno Njanente" |
| 2015 | Henko Flowers and Indian Film | Special Jury Award | | |
| 2016 | South Indian International Movie Awards | Best Playback Singer | Amar Akbar Anthony | "Enno Njanente" |
| 2016 | Red FM Award | Best Debut Singer | Amar Akbar Anthony | "Enno Njanente" |
| 2016 | Red FM Award | New Sensational Singer | | |
| 2016 | Asiavision Movie Awards | New Sensation in Singing | Oppam | "Minungum Minnaminuge" |
| 2016 | Flowers TV Award | Special Jury Mention | Amar Akbar Anthony | "Enno Njanente" |
| 2017 | IIFA Utsavam (Malayalam section) | Best Playback Singer (Female) | Oppam | "Minungum Minnaminuge" |
| 2017 | Asianet Television Awards | Best Playback Singer | Vanambadi | |
| 2017 | Anand TV Award | Prodigy Singing | | |
| 2017 | Thikkurissi Award | Best Playback Singer | Oppam | "Minungum Minnaminuge" |
| 2017 | Vayalar Ramavarma Award | Best Playback Singer | Oppam | "Minungum Minnaminuge" |
| 2017 | Mangalam Music awards | Popular Singer | Oppam | "Minungum Minnaminuge" |
| 2017 | Mangalam Music awards | Singer spl jury | Oppam | "Minungum Minnaminuge" |
| 2018 | Flowers Music awards | spl jury | Pullikaran Staara | Tapp tapp |
| 2018 | UK event life | Budding young nightingale | Album | Mele manathe Eshoye |

== Discography ==
| Year | Song | Film / album | Notes |
|---|---|---|---|
| 2013 | "Pinneyum Snehichu" | Hitham | Album song |
| 2013 | "Chemma Chemma" | Weeping boy | |
| 2013 | "Tharattu pattum" | Weeping boy | |
| 2014 | "Vinnile Naru Punyame" | Sparsam | |
| 2014 | "Divyakarunyame" | | Christian devotional song |
| 2014 | "Aarilum ashrayam" | | Christian devotional song |
| 2014 | "Mele manathe eeshoye" | God | Christian devotional song |
| 2014 | "Sneham Navil" | Niravu | |
| 2015 | "Sree Sabareesane" | Sabari Punyam | Hindu devotional song |
| 2015 | "Oh Snehame" | Kaval | |
| 2015 | "Yenno Njanente" | Amar Akbar Anthony | |
| 2015 | "Anupamasneham" | | |
| 2016 | "Onam Onam Onam" | Ponnaavani Paattukal | |
| 2016 | "Minungum Minnaminunge" | Oppam | |
| 2016 | "Onde Thaayi" | John Jani Janardhan | Kannada film |
| 2017 | Title songs | Vanambadi (TV series) | Malayalam TV serial |
| 2017 | Title songs | Mouna Raagam (Tamil TV series) | Tamil TV series (Vanambadi (TV series) |
| 2017 | Title song | Vezhambal | Malayalam TV serial |
| 2017 | "Tapp Tapp" | Pullikkaran Staraa | |
| 2017 | "Snehamam eshoye" | Love of God Album | |
| 2018 | "Pasiyaara Yenaiyootti" | Vivasaayi (Farmer Tribute) | Tamil Album Song |
| 2018 | Title song | Arundathi | Malayalam TV serial |
| 2018 | "Yarusaleem" | Abrahaminte Santhathikal | |
| 2018 | "Amma I Love You" | Bhaskar Oru Rascal | |
| 2018 | Title song | Kuttikurumban | Malayalam TV serial |
| 2019 | Title song | Ayyappa Saranam | Malayalam TV serial |
| 2019 | "Rekkeyaa" | Kavacha | Kannada remake of "Oppam" |
| 2019 | "Mathaliru Pookkum Kalam" | Professor Dinkan | |
| 2020 | Title song | Ente Maathavu | Malayalam TV serial |
| 2021 | FLOREO - A fusion of the East and West | | Song released on YouTube |
| 2021 | "Nanmakal Nalkidum Nallavanam Yeshuve" | Bright Ministry (YouTube) | Christian Devotional Song |
| 2021 | Eeshoye Nee Varoo | Celebrants India | Christian Devotional Song produced by Angel Audios USA released on YouTube |
| 2023 | "O Kathale" | | Song released on YouTube |
