= Arya Dhayal =

Indian singer

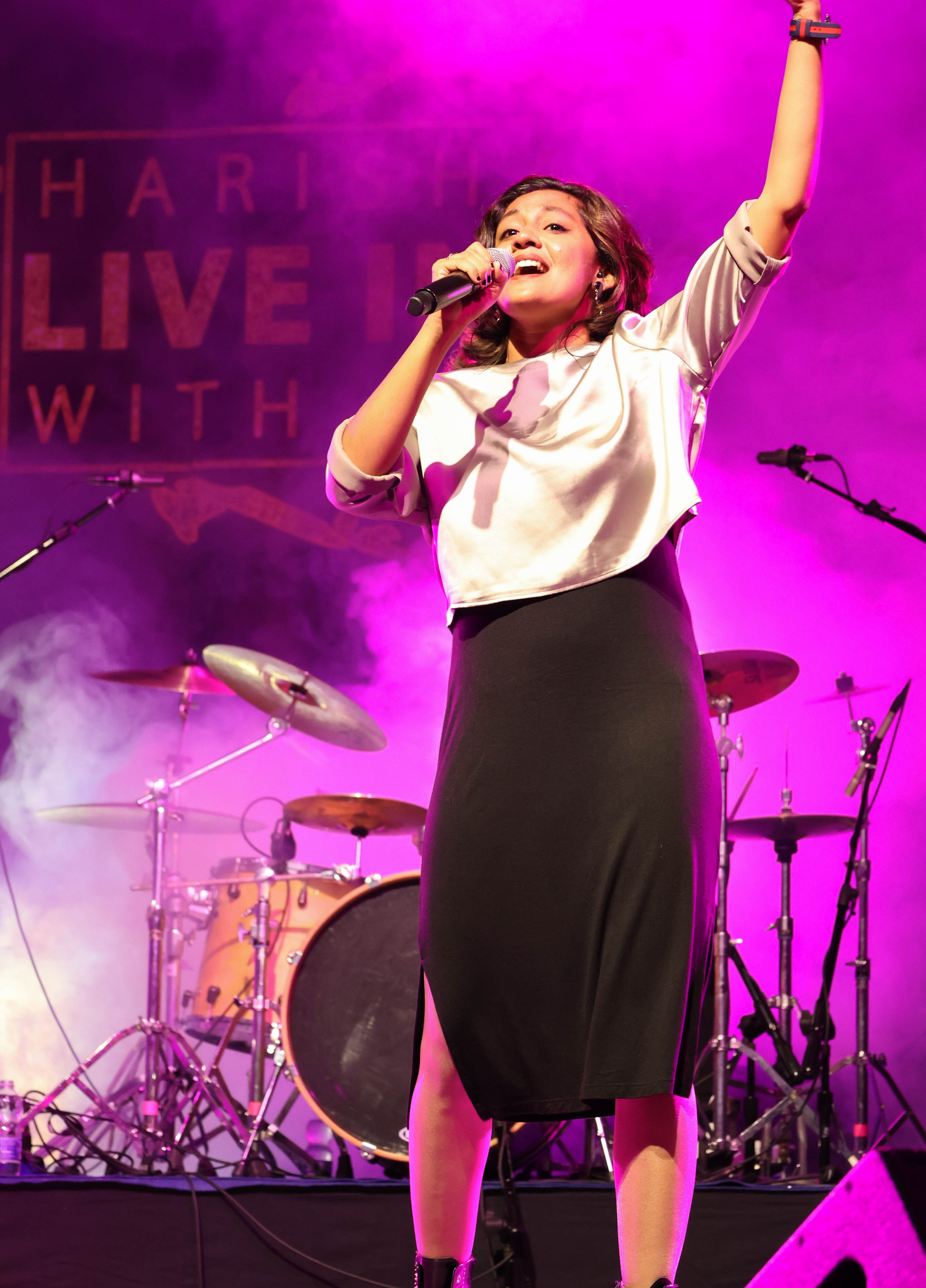
- Arya Dhayal performing live at Dublin with K. S. Harisankar Live.

Background information
- Born: Arya Dhayal; 7 October 1996 (age 29)
- Origin: Kannur, Kerala
- Genres: Indian pop, folk, indie
- Occupations: musician, songwriter, playback singer
- Instrument: Ukulele
- Years active: 2020–present

Arya Dhayal is an Indian singer, songwriter and a playback singer born in Kannur, Kerala. She gained recognition after her Carnatic (Udayaravitchandrika) and Western cover of Ed Sheeran's song "Shape of You" was shared by Bollywood celebrity Amitabh Bachchan on his Twitter (Now, X) account. She is also known for her musical contributions to major film like Brahmāstra: Part One – Shiva and Baby.

== Early life and education ==
Arya Dhayal was born on 7th October 1996 at Kannur, Kerala. She studied at St. Teresa's Anglo-Indian School in Kannur and at the Government Brennen College, Thalassery. She then did her postgraduation in Statistics from the Bharathiar University and later moved to Bengaluru to pursue her postgraduation in Mathematics. She has studied Carnatic music since her childhood.

== Career ==
Dhayal uploaded a video of her recitation of a poem titled ‘Sakhavu’ (Comrade) in 2016. Later, It created the political controversies. Following this, she started creating pop and carnatic mashups of popular western songs and shared them online.

In 2020 she released a cover of Ed Sheeran’s song "Shape of You", which featured udayaravitchandrika and ukulele instruments. The cover went viral on social media, and actor Amitabh Bachchan posted her cover on his Twitter account during the COVID-19 lockdown. She also received substantial support from Malayalam film and music industry. Same year, She released her first English single "King of My Mind" which she has written, composed and sung.

Later, She was invited to perform at Dubai Expo 2020.

In 2021, In collaboration with Woman and Child Development of Kerala, she released "Angane Venam" to raise awareness about the stereotypes that try to limit women.

Same year, she worked with D. Imman in the song Yenge Yen Ponmaalai for the film Udanpirappe which was released on 13 October 2021.

In 2022, She sang "Yelamma Yela" for the Tamil film "Yaanai", starring Arun Vijay. The following year, she collaborated with composer Hesham Abdul Wahab on the song "Rum Pum Pum" for the film "Madhuram".

Dhayal contributed vocals to the song "Deva Deva" in the 2022 fantasy action film Brahmāstra: Part One – Shiva's Malayalam Version. The song also featured vocals by Arijit Singh, Hesham Abdul Wahab and Pritham. Directed by Ayan Mukerji, the film starred Ranbir Kapoor, Alia Bhatt, Mouni Roy, Nagarjuna Akkineni, and Amitabh Bachchan.

In 2023, She was invited to perform at Kappa Original's Music Mojo Season 7.

Later in 2023, She sang "Deva Raaja" for the Vaishnavi Chaitanya starring Telegu Movie "Baby" which received millions of streams.

== Discography ==
Title	Featuring	Year	Label
Aake Thaarumaarithu (From "Oru Sarkar Ulpannam")	Ajmal Hasbulla	2024	Think Music
Brochevarevarura		2024	AD Records
Paluke		2023	Kappa Originals
Palavidham		2023	Kappa Originals
Rum Pum Pum (From "Madhuram")	Hesham Abdul Wahab, Nandhagopan V, Suroor Musthafa	2023	Appu Pathu Pappu Production House
Deva Raaja (From "Baby")	Vijai Bulganin	2023	Sony Music Entertainment
Hoop Sessions (Hoop) – EP		2022	AD Records
Thallu Vandi		2022	Orange Entertainment Media
Deva Deva (From "Brahmāstra: Part One – Shiva (Malayalam)")	Pritham, Hesham Abdul Wahab, Arijit Singh, Shabareesh Varma	2022	Sony Music Entertainment
Yelammaa Yela (From "Yaanai")	G.V. Prakash Kumar	2022	Drumsticks Productions
Harichandana Malarile (Recreated Version)		2021	Sathyam Audios
Angane Venam		2021	AD Records
Zidd Hein	Ari	2020	Blakkoffee Productions
Nadhi	Anil Raveendran	2020	GreenTunez
Nilaanadi		2020	Vusic Records
King of my kind		2020	AD & Friends

== Television ==
Year	Title	Role	Channel	Notes
2020	Lal Onam Nallonam	Performer	Asianet	
2025-2026	Top Singer	Judge	Flowers TV	
