= Intlo Deyyam Nakem Bhayam =

2016 Telugu horror comedy film directed by G.Nageswara Reddy

- Movie Poster
- Directed by: G. Nageswara Reddy
- Written by: G. Nageswara Reddy
- Produced by: B. V. S. N. Prasad
- Starring: Allari Naresh; Kruthika Jayakumar; Mouryani; Rajendra Prasad
- Cinematography: Dasaradhi Sivendra
- Edited by: Kotagiri Venkateswara Rao
- Music by: Sai Karthik
- Production company: SVCC Sri Venkateswara Cine Chitra
- Release date: 30 December 2016
- Running time: 135 mins
- Country: India
- Language: Telugu

Intlo Deyyam Nakem Bhayam (transl. The ghost in the house, why should I fear?) is a 2016 Telugu-language horror comedy film, produced by B. V. S. N. Prasad on SVCC Sri Venkateswara Cine Chitra banner and directed by G. Nageswara Reddy. Starring Allari Naresh, Kruthika Jayakumar, Mouryani and Rajendra Prasad, with music composed by Sai Karthik.

== Cast ==
- Allari Naresh as Naresh
- Kruthika Jayakumar as Indumati
- Mouryani as Swapna
- Rajendra Prasad as Gopala Krishna
- Brahmanandam as C.I.Balaji
- Jaya Prakash Reddy
- Chalapathi Rao as Chalapathi
- Prabhas Sreenu as Seenu
- Shakalaka Shankar
- Jabardasth Chandra
- Giridhar
- Ananth
- Kadambari Kiran
- Amith as Amith
- Prabhakar as Wizard
- Tarzan as Karuna
- Dhanraj
- Pragathi as Gopala Krishna's wife
- Sana
- Rajitha as Constable Mani
- Meena as Indumaathi's mother
- Apoorva as Saloni
- Jayavani

== Production ==
Arundhati was initially considered to play one of the heroines.

== Soundtrack ==
Intlo Deyyam Nakem Bhayam

Film score by Sai Karthik
- Released: 28 October 2016
- Recorded: 2016
- Genre: Soundtrack
- Length: 14:08
- Label: Junglee Audio
- Producer: Sai Karthik

Sai Karthik chronology
Dwaraka (2016)	Intlo Deyyam Nakem Bhayam (2016)	Appatlo Okadundevadu (2016)

Music composed by Sai Karthik. Music released on Junglee Audio Company.

No.	Title	Lyrics	Singer(s)	Length
1.	"Paddanu Indumathi"	Bhaskarabhatla	Dhanunjay	3:06
2.	"Sathamaanam Bhavathi"	Bhaskarabhatla	Revanth, Harini Ivaturi	2:55
3.	"Ayyanu Nene Fidaa"	Ravi Mulakalapalli	Sai Charan, Sai Shilpa	3:00
4.	"Dabbai Dabbai"	Chilaka Rekka Ganesh	Simha, Divija Karthic	3:13
5.	"Jo Achyuthaananda"	Bhaskarabhatla	Sai Geethika	1:44
Total length:				14:08

== Release ==
The Hindu wrote that "Most performances are loud and perfunctory. One sees Brahmanandam after long and he doesn’t disappoint. Drushyam girl Kruthika deserved better than this outing. It’s high time Allari Naresh moved beyond these templates". Sify gave the film aratinf of one-and-three-quarters out of five stars and wrote that "Intlo Deyyam Nakem Bhayam is a formulaic horror-comedy that smells of putrid sequences from start to the end. Second half of the movie tests the patience".
