= Boxer (2015 film) =

2015 Indian Kannada action film

- Directed by: Preetham Gubbi
- Written by: Preetham Gubbi
- Based on: Always/Only You by Song Il-gon
- Produced by: Jayanna - Bhogendra
- Starring: Dhananjay; Kruthika Jayakumar
- Cinematography: Preetha Jayaraman
- Edited by: Jo. Ni. Harsha
- Music by: V. Harikrishna
- Production company: Jayanna Combines
- Release date: 20 November 2015
- Country: India
- Language: Kannada

Boxer is a 2015 Indian Kannada-language romantic action drama film written and directed by Preetham Gubbi and produced by Jayanna - Bhogendra. It stars Dhananjay and Kruthika Jayakumar. The music is composed by V. Harikrishna. The film was released on 20 November 2015.

== Plot ==
Raja is a former moneylender turned kickboxer who uses his boxing skills to earn money for the people who place a bet on him and also, works as a guard in a mall. One night, Raja meets a blind girl named Lakshmi. They soon begin to chat and become interested in each other. During a boxing match, Raja realizes that he has to regain Lakshmi’s eyesight and meets his rival, who tells him about an illegal kickboxing match in Bangkok. Raja admits Lakshmi to an eyecare and heads to Bangkok and bets on a gangster, where he wins the fight. However, Raja is stabbed by the gangster's men, who want to retrieve the money, which leads him to severe spinal injury. After regaining her eyesight, Lakshmi is disappointed upon not seeing Raja and thinks he has abandoned her. Six months later, Lakshmi is working at the same hospital as a physiotherapist, where Raja is getting treated but doesn't recognize him. Raja too doesn't reveal his identity to Lakshmi because of his paralytic condition. On being able to walk with crutches, Raja walks away with a heavy heart and visits the place where they both used to spend time together. However, Lakshmi soon recognizes Raja through a marble which she had given to him. She reaches the same spot, and they finally reunite.

== Cast ==
- Dhananjay as Raja
- Kruthika Jayakumar as Lakshmi
- Rangayana Raghu
- Charandeep
- Sumithra
- Shiva Pradeep
- Anil Kumar
- Ramesh Bhat
- Aravind Rao
- Prakash Shenoy
- Pragathi Gowda
- Rockline Sudhakar
- Shiva Manju

== Production ==
The film was directed by Preetham Gubbi and produced by the duo Jayanna-Bhogendra. Dhananjay played the lead role. The actor had to take kickboxing training. Kruthika Jayakumar was cast after appearing in the Telugu film Drushyam as the daughter of Venkatesh's character. His regular associate V. Harikrishna composed the music. Preetha was tasked with cinematography.

== Soundtrack ==
The soundtrack is composed by V. Harikrishna.

=== Track listing ===
No.	Title	Lyrics	Singer(s)	Length
1.	"Dheem Dheem"	Pawan Wadeyar	Tippu
2.	"Ee Gulaalu"	Jayanth Kaikini	Santhosh Venky, Priya Himesh
3.	"Tagar Putti"	Yogaraj Bhat	Vijay Prakash
4.	"Thunta Tatakiye"	Yogaraj Bhat	Karthik

== See also ==
- List of films about boxing
