= Brahmāstra: Part One – Shiva (soundtrack) =

- Original Soundtrack album cover

Soundtrack album by Pritam
- Released: 6 October 2022
- Recorded: 2019–2022
- Genre: Feature film soundtrack
- Length: 37:59
- Language: Hindi
- Label: Sony Music India
- Producer: Pritam

Pritam chronology
| Laal Singh Chaddha (2022) | Brahmāstra: Part One – Shiva (2022) | Shehzada (2023) |
External audio
- Brahmāstra - Audio Jukebox on YouTube

Singles from Brahmāstra: Part One – Shiva
- 1. "Kesariya" Released: 17 July 2022; 2. "Deva Deva" Released: 8 August 2022; 3. "Dance Ka Bhoot" Released: 25 August 2022; 4. "Rasiya" Released: 24 September 2022; 5. "Shiva Theme" Released: 28 September 2022

Brahmāstra: Part One – Shiva is the soundtrack album for 2022 film of the same name starring Ranbir Kapoor, Alia Bhatt, Mouni Roy, Nagarjuna Akkineni and Amitabh Bachchan, written and directed by Ayan Mukerji. It is produced by Karan Johar, Apoorva Mehta, Namit Malhotra, and Mukerji – in his debut production – under the production companies Dharma Productions, Starlight Pictures, and Prime Focus in association with Star Studios, along with Kapoor and Marijke DeSouza. The film serves as the first installment of a planned trilogy, which is itself planned to be part of a cinematic universe titled Astraverse. The film's soundtrack score was composed and written by Pritam and produced and mixed by British musician Steel Banglez, with songs written by Amitabh Bhattacharya and Prasun Gupta, while English composer Simon Franglen assisted Pritam and the crew on some portions of the background score, which was primarily underlined by Jim Satya, Sunny M.R., Prasad Sashte and Ketan Sodha. The score was recorded at Synchron Stage Vienna.

== Release ==
On 10 April 2022, the first single of the film's soundtrack, titled "Kesariya" was unveiled. Three days later, a teaser of the song was released. "Kesariya" was released on 17 July 2022. On 4 August 2022, the second song from the soundtrack titled "Deva Deva" was unveiled and song was released on 8 August 2022. On 18 August 2022, First look poster of the third song, "Dance Ka Bhoot" and song was released on 25 August 2022. "Rasiya" was released on 24 September 2022. The Shiva Theme was released on 28 September 2022.

The music album was released on 6 October 2022.

== Track listing ==
All lyrics are written by Amitabh Bhattacharya and Sanskrit Shlokas of Shiva theme are written by Prasun Gupta.

Hindi
| No. | Title | Singer(s) | Length |
|---|---|---|---|
| 1. | "Kesariya" | Arijit Singh | 4:29 |
| 2. | "Deva Deva" | Arijit Singh, Jonita Gandhi | 4:39 |
| 3. | "Dance Ka Bhoot" | Arijit Singh | 4:05 |
| 4. | "Rasiya" | Tushar Joshi, Shreya Ghoshal | 4:25 |
| 5. | "Shiva Theme" | Javed Ali | 3:11 |
| 6. | "Kesariya (Dance Mix)" | Shashwat Singh, Antara Mitra, Arijit Singh | 3:17 |
| 7. | "Deva Deva (Film Version)" | Arijit Singh, Jonita Gandhi | 6:15 |
| 8. | "Rasiya (Reprise)" | Arijit Singh | 4:45 |
| 9. | "Dev Theme" | SlowCheeta | 2:54 |
| 10. | "Kesariya Edward Maya Remix" | Arijit Singh | 2:53 |
| Total length: | | | 37:59 |

All lyrics are written by Chandrabose.

Telugu
| No. | Title | Singer(s) | Length |
|---|---|---|---|
| 1. | "Kumkumala" | Sid Sriram | 4:38 |
| 2. | "Deva Deva" | Sreerama Chandra, Arijit Singh, Jonita Gandhi | 4:36 |
| 3. | "Allari Motha" | Nakash Aziz | 4:05 |
| Total length: | | | 13:19 |

All lyrics are written by Madhan Karky.

Tamil
| No. | Title | Singer(s) | Length |
|---|---|---|---|
| 1. | "Theethiriyaai" | Sid Sriram | 4:38 |
| 2. | "Deva Deva" | Sid Sriram, Arijit Singh, Jonita Gandhi | 4:36 |
| 3. | "Dancela Bodha Yethuda" | Anirudh Ravichander | 4:05 |
| Total length: | | | 13:19 |

Kannada
| No. | Title | Lyrics | Singer(s) | Length |
|---|---|---|---|---|
| 1. | "Kesariya Rangu" | Yogaraj Bhat | Sanjith Hegde, Sid Sriram | 4:38 |
| 2. | "Deva Deva" | Hridaya Shiva | Sanjith Hegde, Arijit Singh, Jonita Gandhi | 4:36 |
| 3. | "Dancina Huchchu" | Hridaya Shiva | Nakash Aziz | 4:05 |
| Total length: | | | | 13:19 |

All lyrics are written by Shabareesh Varma.

Malayalam
| No. | Title | Singer(s) | Length |
|---|---|---|---|
| 1. | "Kunkumamaake" | Hesham Abdul Wahab, Sid Sriram | 4:38 |
| 2. | "Deva Deva" | Hesham Abdul Wahab, Arijit Singh, Arya Dhayal | 4:36 |
| 3. | "Piri Ilaki Aadi" | Benny Dayal | 4:05 |
| Total length: | | | 13:19 |

== Reception ==
On reviewing the first single "Kesariya", a critic from Pinkvilla called the song "pure auditory bliss with Arijit's velvet voice". On reviewing the second single "Deva Deva", another critic from Pinkvilla wrote that "The song begins with Shiva's journey as he unlocks his powers and channels his connection to the world of astras. The song also shows a glimpse of Amitabh Bachchan, who seems to be helping Ranbir connect with his light."
