= Kruthika Jayakumar =

Indian actress

- Born: Bengaluru, Karnataka, India
- Occupations: Actress, classical dancer
- Years active: 2014–present

Kruthika Jayakumar is an Indian actress and classical dancer, who works in Telugu and Kannada-language films. She has worked in movies like Intlo Deyyam Nakem Bhayam and Kavacha.

== Career ==
Kruthika Jayakumar hails from a Tamil speaking family in Bengaluru, Karnataka .Kruthika started practicing Bharatanatyam from age seven. She trained under Sri Mithun Shyam in Bangalore. She was performing at a show in Thiruvananthapuram when Malayalam film director Balu Kiriyath spotted her and convinced her to foray into cinema. She later auditioned and was selected for the role of Venkatesh Daggubati's daughter in Drushyam, a Telugu remake of Malayalam film Drishyam. She made her Kannada debut with Boxer co-starring Dhananjaya. She played the role of a dancer in Kavacha (2018) co-starring Shiva Rajkumar. Her Tamil film Santhana Devan co-starring Arya remains unreleased.

== Filmography ==
Year	Title	Role	Language	Notes
2014	Drushyam	Anju	Telugu	
2015	Boxer	Lakshmi	Kannada	
2015	Vinavayya Ramayya	Janaki	Telugu	
2016	Rojulu Marayi	Aadhya	Telugu	
2016	Intlo Deyyam Nakem Bhayam	Indhumathi	Telugu	
2019	Kavacha	Revathi	Kannada	
2021	Drushyam 2	Anju	Telugu	Amazon Prime Video release
