= 1000 – Oru Note Paranja Katha =

- Theatrical release poster
- Directed by: A. R. C. Nair
- Written by: A. R. C. Nair
- Produced by: Nishi Govind
- Starring: Bharath; Mukesh; Maqbool Salmaan
- Cinematography: Thomas Thankachan
- Edited by: Tiju Kurisinkal
- Music by: Rajesh Mohan
- Production company: InFilm Movie Makers
- Distributed by: InFilm Movie Makers
- Release date: 13 February 2015
- Country: India
- Language: Malayalam

1000 : Oru Note Paranja Katha (transl. 1000 – Story narrated by rupee note) is a 2015 Indian Malayalam comedy thriller film directed by A. R. C. Nair. The film features Bharath, Mukesh and Maqbool Salmaan in the lead roles along with Leema Babu and Kalaranjini in key supporting roles. The film was released worldwide on 13 February 2015.

== Plot ==
The film follows the journey of a 1000 rupee note after autistic 26 year old Jikku Mon loses it after he receives it from his father.

== Cast ==
- Bharath as Jikku Mon
- Mukesh as Jikku Mon's father
- Maqbool Salmaan as Henchman
- Biyon as Hospital attender
- Shammi Thilakan as Police inspector
- Kalaranjini
- Anju Aravind as Henchman's wife
- Baby Meenakshi
- Leema Babu as Hospital attender's girlfriend
- Santhosh Keezhattoor as Minister
- Santhakumari
- Kumarakom Raghunath
- Rakendu as Temple priest
- Nishi Govind as Girl's mother

== Production ==
Meenakshi made her debut through this film.

== Soundtrack ==
The music for the film is composed by Rajesh Mohan.

All lyrics are written by Rajeev Alunkal.

Track listing
No.	Title	Singer(s)	Length
1.	"Panamorunaal"	Rajesh Mohan
2.	"Pakalin Poomala Mele"	P. Jayachandran

== Reception ==
The Times of India gave the film a negative review stating "one joke after another falls flat and the movie becomes far from enjoyable and is at best a timid effort to entertain the audience".
