= Kolumittayi =

- Theatrical release poster
- Directed by: Arun Vishwam
- Screenplay by: Arun Viswam; Abijith Asokan
- Story by: Abijith Asokan
- Produced by: Abijith Asokan
- Starring: Gourav Menon; Baby Meenakshi; Anjali Aneesh Upasana; Dinesh Nair; Kalabhavan Prajod
- Narrated by: Abijith Asokan
- Cinematography: Santhosh Anima
- Edited by: Sunesh Sebastian
- Music by: Sreeraj Sahajan
- Production company: Crayons Pictures
- Release date: 28 October 2016 (India)
- Country: India
- Language: Malayalam

Kolumittayi (English: Stick Candy) is a 2016 Indian Malayalam-language children's film directed by Arun Viswam. The film set in the 1980s, tells the story of Unni (Gourav Menon) and his three friends Abu, Lalu, and Varkey. Others in the cast includes Saiju Kurup, Dinesh Prabhakar, Sohan Seenulal, Dr. Roney, Kalabhavan Prajod, Gokulan, Devi Ajith, Krishnaprabha, Priyanka and 30 other child actors.

== Plot ==
The film opens to the life of Unni and his friends. After having a blast of a vacation, they move to the 6th grade after the new academic year opens. The life in school brings lot of joy to Unni because of the presence of his crush Riya. Unni feels threatened by the newcomer in his class – Roney, who happens to be talented in various disciplines of art. Soon they lock horns and are in competition. Unni and his friends with their happy go lucky nature get into odds with their teacher.

== Cast ==
- Gourav Menon as Unni
- Aakash Santhosh as Abu
- Baby Meenakshi as Riya
- Sidharth as Lalu
- Naif as Ronny
- Saiju Kurup as Satheeshan Puzhakkara
- Krishna Praba as Molly
- Anjali Aneesh Upasana as Daisy
- Kalabhavan Prajodh as Sudheer
- Bineesh Bastin
- Devi Ajith as Unni's Mother

== Production ==
Arun Viswam who was assisted Abrid Shine in the projects, 1983 and Action Hero Biju. 30 child artists were selected through an audition conducted in co-operation with Kochu TV. The music and background scoring was done by Sreeraj Sahajan, mixing and mastering by Ramu Raj. The choreography was by K. P. Sreejith and costumes by Steffy Zaviour

== Critical reception ==
Sarath Ramesh Kuniyl from The Week rated 4 in a scale of 5, and said: "Kolumittayi cannot, and should not, be dismissed as a children's film with dollops of nostalgia. There is a lesson or two for the grown-ups as well".
