= Seethalakshmi Prakash =

Indian Singer, Winner TopSinger

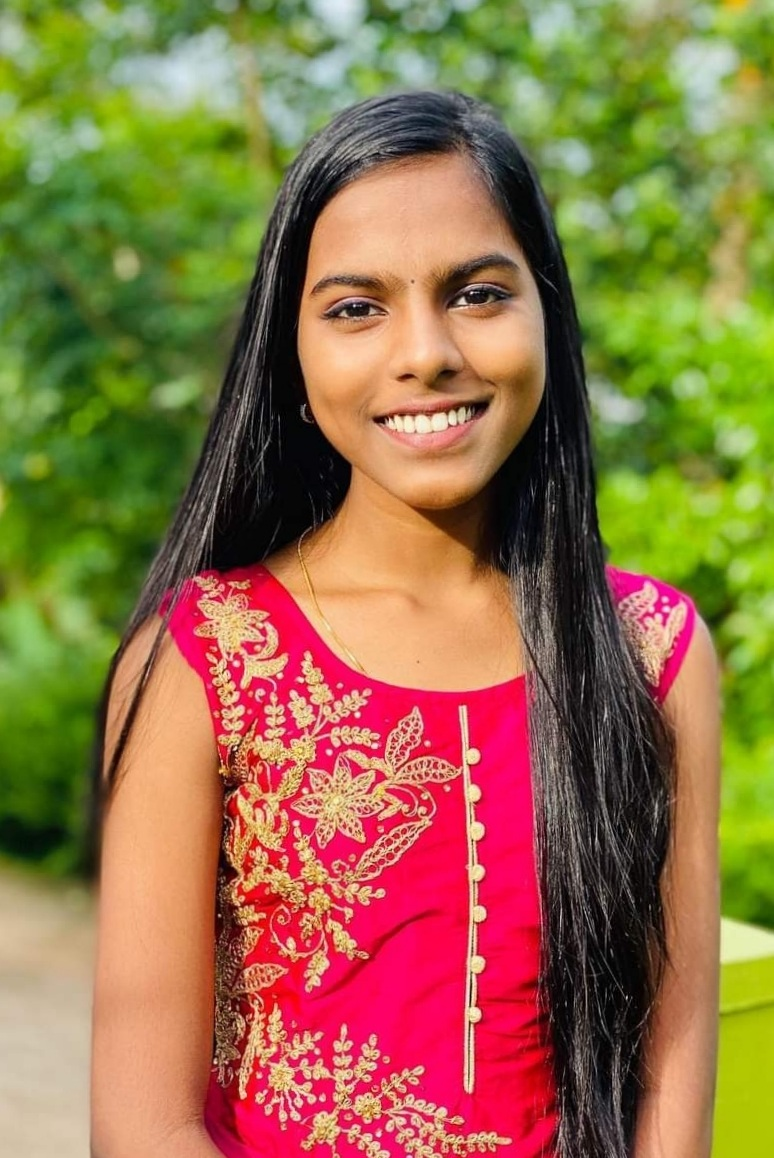
- Born: 7 May 2005 (age 21); Changanassery, Kottayam, Kerala, India
- Occupation: Singer

Seethalakshmi Prakash (born 7 May 2005) is an Indian singer. She rose to fame in 2020 when she was crowned Flowers TV "Top Singer", winning the marathon first season of the popular Flowers TV series, "Top Singer".

She has recorded over 20 songs in Malayalam and made guest television and video-link concert appearances in India and abroad. She has performed on multiple albums, collaborating with musicians like Vidyadharan Master and Abhijith Kollam. She has over 300,000 followers on social media.

== Career ==
During the 22-month, daily primetime run of the Top Singer premiere, Seethalakshmi competed in a total of 82 episodes and was judged "best performer of the day" in 38 of these. With the grand prize for the season, her prizes – a house and a scholarship – amounted to some US$95,000.

After her win in Top Singer, Seethalakshmi has performed concerts by video-link for audiences in London, UK, Philadelphia, USA and Kuwait. She made multiple guest appearances on the new season of "Top Singer" and on Flowers TV, and recorded a music video, "Varavelpu", directed by award-winning director Rajesh Irulam

She received the Prem Nazir Memorial Award for the best female singer in Malayalam Television for 2021.

== Family ==
Seethalakshmi's parents are Prakash Puthunilam and Bindu Prakash.

== Discography (Selected) ==
Year	Song	Film/Album/Publisher	Comments
2025	"Radheyam"	Music Video - February 2026, Abundance Productions	Composer: Santhosh Kumar
2025	"Kalabham Charthiya"	Film - Avani, (Malayalam), Solo, Nov 6,2025,	lyrics: Karthikapally Rajan Music & Orchestration: Binoj & Binoy,
2023	"Pachathullan"	Album - Swaraj Films	Lyrics: P K Gopi Music: TS Jairaj
2022	"Kalvari Kunnil"	Jeremias Creations- Publisher	Lyrics & Music: Jaison Joy Karukachal
2021	"Varavelpu"	Album - Seethayanam, Solo	Music Director Vidyadharan Master, Video Director Rajesh Irulam
2021	"Uyire Oru Janmam"	Film - Minnal Murali, Solo, Not Credited; Netflix release did not include the song	Music Director Shaan Rahman, One million views on Utube
2021	"Shravanam Varavay"	Album - Eanapookkalam, Duet with Abhijit Kollam	Music Director Jayan B
2021	"Onathumbi"	Publisher - Manorama Music, Duet with Vipin Nath	Music Director Madhu Anchal
2021	"Ponnonakkalam"	Publisher - Sebin Seba Music	Music Director - Bindhu Saji
2020	"Rakshrakan Yesuvin"	Publisher - Movie World LLC	Malayalam Christian Devotional Song
2019	"Swarga Noopura Nadayil"	Album name : Devasangeetham	Music : Girish Dev Lyrics : Suku CR Chanjikkal

== See also ==
- List of Top Singer episodes
