= Kavacha =

2019 film by G. V. R. Vasu

- Theatrical release poster
- Directed by: G. V. R. Vasu
- Screenplay by: G. V. R. Vasu
- Story by: Govind Vijayan
- Based on: Oppam
- Produced by: M. V. V. Satyanarayana; A. Sampath
- Starring: Shiva Rajkumar; Kruthika Jayakumar; Baby Meenakshi; Vasishta N. Simha; Isha Koppikar
- Narrated by: Ananth Nag
- Cinematography: Rahul Shrivastav
- Edited by: Joni Harsha
- Music by: Arjun Janya; 4 Musics
- Production company: Hayagriva Movie Adishtana
- Distributed by: Jayanna Films
- Release date: 5 April 2019
- Running time: 158 minutes
- Country: India
- Language: Kannada

Kavacha (transl. Armour) is a 2019 Indian Kannada-language action thriller film written and directed by G. V. R. Vasu in his directorial debut. It is the remake of the 2016 Malayalam film Oppam, with changes made in the script to suit the interests of Kannada-speaking audiences - also being Shivarajkumar's first official remake in 14 years. The film stars Shiva Rajkumar, Kruthika Jayakumar, Isha Koppikar, Baby Meenakshi and Vasishta N. Simha. It was released worldwide on 5 April 2019 and got positive reviews from critics.

== Plot ==
Jayarama is a blind man who lives with a large family and works as a lift operator and caretaker in an apartment building in Bangalore. He supports his sister's wedding and is devoted to Krishnamurthy, a retired Supreme Court Judge who lives in the building. Jayarama accompanies Krishnamurthy on his search for someone, and Krishnamurthy eventually reveals the reason.

Years earlier, Krishnamurthy imprisoned a man named Vasudeva for a crime he did not commit. Although Krishnamurthy knew Vasu was innocent, he followed the letter of the law. Vasu's family subsequently poisoned themselves, leaving him insane. After his release from prison, Vasu vows revenge, warning Krishnamurthy that he will kill him and his family.

Krishnamurthy fears for his young daughter Nandini, whom he has sent to a convent school under a false separation so that Vasu will not discover her existence. Jayarama, at Krishnamurthy's request, regularly visits Nandini, who repeatedly asks about her father; Jayarama promises to bring him another day. Krishnamurthy and Jayarama secretly transfer money from Krishnamurthy's bank account into an account opened for Nandini, avoiding an electronic transfer to reduce scrutiny. Jayarama withdraws the money and gives it to Krishnamurthy, who stores it in a safe.

Following a large wedding celebration attended by the residents, Jayarama visits Krishnamurthy's flat and finds him dead. Sensing another person's presence, he subdues the intruder, but the killer, Vasu, escapes after discovering that Jayarama is blind. Krishnamurthy's money is also missing, leading the police to suspect Jayarama. During a subsequent pursuit, Vasu kills Krishnamurthy's brother-in-law Natraj and manipulates events so that Jayarama is charged with both murders.

Arrested by the police, Jayarama pleads for an opportunity to find the real killer. During interrogation, the police attempt to force him to confess by threatening his girlfriend Revathi, but Jayarama fights back and escapes with her. With the help of his friend Inspector Gowri, he tries to protect Nandini from Vasu. Jayarama reveals that Nandini is actually Vasu's daughter and that Vasu intends to kill her.

Jayarama, Nandini and Gowri take refuge in the convent under the Mother Superior's supervision. Vasu arrives and knocks Gowri unconscious. Jayarama locates Vasu by calling his phone and, after hearing his ringtone, shoots him. As Vasu lies dying, Jayarama reveals Nandini's true identity. In the end, Jayarama, Revathi and Nandini begin a new life together as a loving family.

== Cast ==
- Shiva Rajkumar as Jayarama aka Ramappa
- Kruthika Jayakumar as Revathi
- Vasishta N. Simha as Vasudeva
- Baby Meenakshi as Nandini
- Isha Koppikar as Gowri
- Jayaprakash as Justice Krishnamurthy
- Iti Acharya as Priya
- Ravi Kale as Inspector Basavaraj
- Rajesh Nataranga
- Ramesh Bhat as Jayarama's uncle
- Girija Lokesh as Jayarama's aunt
- Vishwas Bharadwaj
- Srikanth Iyengar as Natraj
- Srinivas Prabhu
- Laya Kokila as Manja
- Tabla Nani as Gurusiddha, Jayarama's friend
- Prakash Thuminad as Balu, Jayarama's friend
- Madhu Hegde
- K. S. Ravindranath
- Malathi Shekhar
- Girish Jatti
- Krishna Hebbale
- Balaraj as Shekhar
- Lakshmi Hegde
- Ganesh Rao Kesarkar

== Production ==
In November 2016, Priyadarshan confirmed that a Kannada remake of his Malayalam directorial venture Oppam would star Shiva Rajkumar. The remake, titled Kavacha, is produced by M. V. V. Satyanarayana and A. Sampath under Hayagriva Movie Adishtana, and marks the directorial debut of G. V. R. Vasu. He also worked as screenwriter, working on the screenplay for more than seven months, rewriting it substantially to suit the interests of Kannada-speaking audiences, that included giving more emphasis to the action elements. Baby Meenakshi was chosen to reprise her role from the original. Principal photography began on 23 November 2017, and ended in early August 2018. Shooting took place in Mysore, Ooty, and Bangalore. Rahul Shrivastav was the cinematographer.

== Soundtrack ==
The soundtrack was composed by Arjun Janya and 4 Musics. Janya composed all songs except "Rekkeya", which 4 Musics composed; that song has two versions, a duet and a solo. The film features a remix of the song "Hosa Belaku Moodutidde" from Hosa Belaku (1982), but that does not appear on the soundtrack.

Track listing
No.	Title	Lyrics	Music	Singer(s)	Length
1.	"Kanneera"	K. Kalyan	Arjun Janya	Vyasraj	4:35
2.	"Yaaro Nee"	K. Kalyan	Arjun Janya	Vyasraj	3:32
3.	"Rekkeya" (duet)	V. Nagendra Prasad	4 Musics	S. P. Balasubrahmanyam, Sreya Jayadeep	5:09
4.	"Rekkeya" (solo)	V. Nagendra Prasad	4 Musics	Sreya Jayadeep	4:43
Total length:					17:59

== Release ==
Kavacha was released worldwide on 5 April 2019. It was originally scheduled for released on 7 December 2018, but was postponed due to "technical issues" with the sound mixing.

== Critical response ==
Shyamprasad S of Bangalore Mirror said "Shiva Rajkumar as a blind man delivers a stunning performance" and "Kavacha will remain as one [of] Shiva Rajkumar's best films". Sunayana Surresh of The Times of India called it an emotional tale of revenge that has its moments, especially laudable for the nail-biting climax with both Shivarajkumar and Vasishta N Simha on top of their game. A Sharadhaa of New Indian Express said that in spite of being a remake, what makes Kavacha stands out on its own is the performance by Shivarajkumar – an obvious sign that he has risen to the stature of a realistic actor. Aravind Shwetha of The News Minute noted that a lot of minor characters from the original have been eliminated for good making it a decent thriller with an exceptional performance by Shivanna.
