= Kesariya (song) =

2022 song by Pritam

- Official song cover

Single by Pritam featuring Arijit Singh

from the album Brahmāstra: Part One – Shiva
- Language: Hindi
- Released: 17 July 2022
- Recorded: 2020–2022
- Genre: Dance; pop; soft rock
- Length: 4:29
- Label: Sony Music India
- Composer: Pritam
- Lyricist: Amitabh Bhattacharya
- Producer: Pritam

Music video
- "Kesariya" on YouTube

"Kesariya" is a song by Indian singer-composer Pritam, featuring singer Arijit Singh. Written by Amitabh Bhattacharya and produced by Pritam, it was released as a single on July 17, 2022 via Sony Music India, and was featured on the soundtrack album of the 2022 Indian film Brahmāstra: Part One – Shiva.

The song was also released in Telugu as "Kumkumala", in Tamil as "Theethiriyaai", in Kannada as "Kesariya Rangu" and in Malayalam as "Kunkumamaake". "Kesariya" peaked at #1 on Billboard India, and UK Asian charts. Song crossed over 500 million views on YouTube as of October 2023. In April 2024, the song surpassed 500 million streams on Spotify, marking the first Indian song to achieved this milestone.

== Release ==
On 10 April 2022, the first single of the film's soundtrack, titled "Kesariya" was unveiled. Three days later, a teaser of the song was released. "Kesariya" was released on 17 July 2022. Official lyrical video was released on 22 August 2022, through YouTube. Dance mix of the song, recorded by Shashwat Singh and Antara Mitra was released on 1 October. Film version of the song was released on 9 December.

== Music video ==
The music video features Ranbir Kapoor and Alia Bhatt. It was choreographed by Ganesh Acharya. The music video was shot at Kashi Vishwanath Temple in Varanasi and in River Ganges.

== Critical reception ==
Bhavna Agarwal of India Today wrote "Ranbir Kapoor and Alia Bhatt present love ballad of the year". Hindustan Times wrote "Alia Bhatt promises to always stand by Ranbir Kapoor in their love anthem." ABP News wrote "the track showcases love-filled chemistry of Ranbir Kapoor and Alia Bhatt".

== Plagiarism ==
The tune and composition of the song were alleged to have been plagiarised from the Pakistani band Call's song "Laree Chootee" and folk song "Charkha" by social media users.

== Other versions ==
The song was released in Telugu as "Kumkumala" with lyrics written by Chandrabose. The song was released in Tamil as "Theethiriyaai" with lyrics written by Madhan Karky. The song was released in Kannada as "Kesariya Rangu" with lyrics written by Yogaraj Bhat. The song was released in Malayalam as "Kunkumamaake" with lyrics written by Shabareesh Varma. Telugu, Tamil, Kannada and Malayalam versions of the song was sung by Sid Sriram alongside Sanjith Hegde and Hesham Abdul Wahab.

== Impact ==
The song received positive reception from audiences, praising the music. The hook step, performed by Kapoor and Bhatt, went viral on social media.

== Credits and personnel ==
Credits adapted from YouTube.

- Pritam – composer
- Amitabh Bhattacharya – lyricist
- Arijit Singh – vocal
- Nikhita Gandhi – additional vocal
- Ganesh Acharya – choreographer
- Shadab Rayeen – mixing engineer, mastering engineer
- Dhrubajyoti Phukan – sound design, music arrangement

== Accolades ==
| Award (Note: Awards, festivals and organizations are in Alphabetical order.) | Date of ceremony (Note: Date is linked to the article about the awards held that year, wherever possible.) | Category | Recipient(s) | Result | Ref. |
|---|---|---|---|---|---|
| Filmfare Awards | 27 April 2023 | Best Lyricist | Amitabh Bhattacharya | Won | |
| Filmfare Awards | 27 April 2023 | Best Male Playback Singer | Arijit Singh | Won | |
| International Indian Film Academy Awards | 26 and 27 May 2023 | Best Lyricist | Amitabh Bhattacharya | Won | |
| International Indian Film Academy Awards | 26 and 27 May 2023 | Best Male Playback Singer | Arijit Singh | Won | |
| Zee Cine Awards | 26 February 2023 | Song of the Year | "Kesariya" | Won | |
| Zee Cine Awards | 26 February 2023 | Best Lyricist | Amitabh Bhattacharya | Won | |
| Zee Cine Awards | 26 February 2023 | Best Male Playback Singer | Arijit Singh | Won | |
| Mirchi Music Awards | TBA | Listener's Choice - Film Song of the year | "Kesariya" | Pending | |
| Mirchi Music Awards | TBA | Song of The Year | "Kesariya" | Pending | |
| Mirchi Music Awards | TBA | Male Vocalist Of The Year | Arijit Singh | Pending | |
| Mirchi Music Awards | TBA | Music Composer Of The Year | Pritam | Pending | |
| Mirchi Music Awards | TBA | Lyricist Of The Year | Amitabh Bhattacharya | Pending | |
| Mirchi Music Awards | TBA | Best Song Producer (Programming & Arranging) | Himonshu Parikh and DJ Phukan | Pending | |
| Mirchi Music Awards | TBA | Best Song Engineer (Recording & Mixing) | Aaroh Velankar, Aniruddh Anantha, Ashwin Kulkarni, Harjot Kaur, Himanshu Shirlekar, Pranav Gupta, Sukanto Singha and Shadab Rayeen | Pending | |

== Charts ==
Chart performances for "Kesariya"
| Chart (2022) | Peak position |
|---|---|
| India (Billboard) Kesariya | 1 |
| Asian Music Chart Kesariya | 1 |
