= Top Singer (TV series) =

- Genre: Reality; Talent contest
- Created by: Sindhu Sreedhar
- Presented by: Meenakshi Anoop; Esther Anil; Sreya Jayadeep; Manjadi Joby; Koushik S Vinod; Dain Davis
- Judges: M. G. Sreekumar; M. Jayachandran; Sithara Krishnakumar; Anuradha Sriram; Vidhu Prathap; Madhu Balakrishnan; Binni Krishnakumar; Sharreth; Rahul Raj; Nithya Mammen; Rimi Tomy; Arya Dhayal; Deepak Dev; Veena Nandakumar; Amritha Suresh
- Country of origin: India
- Original language: Malayalam
- No. of seasons: 7
- No. of episodes: 2085+ (list of episodes)

Production
- Production locations: Ernakulam, Kerala
- Camera setup: Multi-camera
- Running time: 60–120 minutes

Original release
- Network: Flowers TV
- Release: 22 September 2018 – present

Top Singer is an Indian Malayalam-language reality television singing competition show broadcast on Flowers, created and directed by Sindhu Sreedhar. The show features 22 contestants, all under the age of 15. Esther Anil hosted the show for the first 49 episodes. After co-hosting the 50th episode with Meenakshi Anoop, Meenakshi took over as the sole host. Top Band is the orchestra of the show. It is currently the longest running Malayalam reality show.

The first season aired from 1 November 2018 to 1 September 2020.

The second season of the show aired from September 2020 to September 9, 2022.

The third season aired from 4 October 2022 to 29 August 2023.

The fourth season aired from 13 September 2023 to 15 September 2024.

The fifth season aired from 24 September 2024 to 14 September 2025.

The sixth season aired from 22 September 2025 to on 26 August 2026.

The seventh season launched on 7 September 2026.

== Series overview ==
Series	Episodes	Originally released	
Series	Episodes	First released	Last released
1	547	22 September 2018	1 September 2020
2	400+	29 September 2020	9 September 2022
3	217	4 October 2022	29 August 2023
4	304	13 September 2023	15 September 2024
5	325	24 September 2024	5 September 2025
6	273	22 September 2025	26 August 2026
7	21	7 September 2026	TBA

== Cast ==
season	Host	Co- Host	Main Judging Panel	Additional judges
1	Esther Anil /Meenakshi Anoop	—N/a	M.G. Sreekumar; M. Jayachandran; Sithara Krishnakumar / Anuradha Sriram; Vidhu Prathap /Madhu Balakrishnan {444,447-48,450-51,453-54,456,462-63}	
2	Meenakshi Anoop/ Sreya Jayadeep	Parvathy Babu (Backstage Anchor); Jewel Mary (Epi.1); Aiswarya (Katturumbu fame)	M. G. Sreekumar; M. Jayachandran	Anuradha Sriram, Binni Krishnakumar
3	Meenakshi Anoop	Manjady Joby	M. G. Sreekumar; Rahul Raj; Binni Krisnhnakumar	Anuradha Sriram; Sharreth
4	Meenakshi Anoop	Koushik S Vinod (left the show)	M. G. Sreekumar; Nithya Mammen/Mridula Warrier/Binni Krishnakumar/Anuradha Sriram; Sharreth/Madhu Balakrishnan{181-192,194-230}	Sujatha Mohan; Rimi Tomy
5	Meenakshi Anoop	Dain Davis	M. G. Sreekumar; Rimi Tomy; Binni Krisnhnakumar	Madhu Balakrishnan; Sharreth
6	Meenakshi Anoop	—N/a	Madhu Balakrishnan; M Jayachandran; Arya Dhayal	
7	Meenakshi Anoop	—N/a	Madhu Balakrishnan; Deepak Dev; Amritha Suresh	Veena Nandakumar

=== Guest Judging Panel (season 1) ===
- Vaikom Vijayalakshmi (Episodes 30 – 32 )
- Mridula Warrier (Episodes 63 – 65, 88 – 90, 259 – 266, 345 – 349, 354, 359, 475, 476 )
- Stephen Devassy (Episodes 66 – 69 )
- Sudeep Kumar
- Biju Narayanan (Episodes 333 – 335, 337 – 340, 343 )
- Srinivas (Episodes 337, 339 – 344)
- Shakthisree Gopalan (Episodes 350 – 353, 355 – 358 )
- Naresh Iyer
- Haricharan
- Jyotsna Radhakrishnan
- Alphons Joseph
- Afsal

=== Celebrity Guests (season 1) ===
- Innocent (Episodes 1 – 2 )
- Sreya Jayadeep (Child Singer)
- Manoj K. Jayan (Episodes 7 – 8, 169 – 172 )
- Salim Kumar (Episodes 9 – 10, 18 – 20 )
- Urvashi (actress) (Episodes 11 – 17 )
- Seema (actress) (Episodes 21 – 29 )
- Nikki Galrani (Episodes 30 – 32 )
- Ramesh Pisharody (Episodes 33 – 37, 74 – 78, 329 )
- Miya (Episodes 38 – 40)
- Jayaram (Episodes 50, 54 – 56 )
- Priya Raman (Episodes 88 – 89 )
- Mohanlal (Episodes 326 – 332)
- Mammootty (Episode 336 )
- Tovino Thomas (Episode 344 )
- Aparna Balamurali
- Rani Johnson (wife of Johnson (composer))
- Latha Raju (Episodes 324 – 325 )
- Sreekumaran Thampi
- P. Jayachandran
- Ouseppachan
- L. R. Eswari
- Dileep (Episode 420)
- Jayasurya (Episode 421)
- Manju Warrier
- Namitha Pramod
- Kaithapram Damodaran
- Mohan Sithara
- Bharathi Thamburatti (wife of Vayalar Ramavarma)
- Nanjiyamma
- B. Vasantha
- Bhavana (actress)
- Mukesh (Grand finale)

=== Guest Judging Panel (season 2) ===
- Vaishnavy Kv
- Aparna Rajeev
- Theertha Sathyan
- Ahaana krishna
- Nehal
- Meena
- Seema
- Sneha Jhonson
- Rekha
- Madhusree narayan
- Anna reshma rajan

=== Celebrity guest(Season2) ===
- Innocent (Actor)
- Padmapriya
- Vidyadharan
- Mohan Sithara
- Vijay Yesudas
- Sreekumaran Thampi
- Anna Rajan
- Mridula Warrier
- Afsal
- Siddique (director)
- Durga Krishna
- Remya Nambeesan
- Manasa Radhakrishnan
- Gopika
- Honey Rose
- Gouri G. Kishan
- Sibi Malayil
- Mia George
- Guinness Pakru
- Gayatri Arun
- Manju Warrier
- Unni Mukundan
- Thesni Khan
- Tini Tom
- I. M. Vijayan
- Daleema
- Meera Jasmin
- Veena Nandakumar
- Rajisha Vijayan
- Divya Pillai
- Noorin Shereef
- Priya Prakash Varrier
- Ahaana Krishna
- Nimisha Sajayan

== Crew ==
- Host : Meenakshi Anoop / Manjadi Joby
- Director : Sindhu Sridhar
- Creative Head : Anil Ayiroor
- Director of Photography (DOP) : Biju K Krishnan
- Post-production
  - Manager : Rajeesh Sugunan
  - Edit & Creative : Shijo Thaliyichira
- Edit : Harikrishnan, Amal Tom, Sergin Thomas, Joseph Shijo, Akhil Mohan, Binil RAj, Nayan Anand, Praveen Prakashan, Aravind Vasudev
- Audio Engineer : Tijo Manimala
- Assistant Sound Engineer : Tony Jacob, Jubin Joseph, Shyam Sajikumar
- Digital Head : Sreeraj CS
- Graphics : Nithil Besto, Sujesh AK, Vineeth Anchal, Yadhukrishnan PR
- Colorist : Anoop Antony, Priju Jose
- Camera : Sunil Chovara, Aji Pushkar, Prashanth SS, Mithun, Shinu, Arun Ezhupunna, Anoop, Dhaneesh Pallippuram, Prashanth Kannan
- On-line Editor : Anoj Irinjalakuda, Ranjith Vettathu
- Script : Sunil Valathungal, Rahul Madathil
- Choreographer : Vishnu Raj, Shafeeq Sandra 'D Crew'
- Technical Head : Sharath Palakkadavath
- Technical Manager : Sreelal
- Technical Engineers : Sudarshanan, Harikrishnan
- Assistant Producers : Anul TR, Sanoop KV, Amal Kumar
- Art Direction : Bibin, Pramod

=== Top Band ===
The orchestra for the show is a group of highly talented artists (season 1).

- Keyboardist : Faisal Muhammad(kannan)
- Rhythm Programmer : Linu Lal (Linu Rishin Linu)
- Wind Instruments (Flute / Saxophone) : Raghuthaman
- Lead Guitar : Jose Thomas
- Bass Guitar : Denson Fernandez
- Strings : Francis Xavier, Francis Sebastian, Herald, Glibson (Cochin Strings )
- Tabla : Anand Cochin, Devadas
- Sound Engineer: Tijo Manimala

Old top band is replaced by new one in December 2019

== Contestants ==
(in the order of appearance for Final Audition )

Season 1			Season 2		
Name	Place	Final Audition	Name	Place	Final Audition
Sivani B Sanjeev	Thalassery	Selected	Sreedev. P	Malappuram	Selected
Vaishnavy Panicker	Hyderabad	Selected	Asna. N	Karunagappally	Selected from Priority list
Theertha Sathyan Kottaykkal	Malappuram	Selected	Seba. M	Thrissur	Eliminated from Priority list
Asna	Karunagappalli	Eliminated from Standby	Meghna Sumesh	Bangalore	Selected
Aishwarya	Ranni	Eliminated from Standby	Hanoona Azees	Kannur	Selected
Koushik S Vinod	Kuttiady	Selected	Sarangi LR	Kollam	Eliminated from priority list
Jennifer Alice	Vypin	Selected	Bevan Biju	Kottayam	Selected
P Anand Bhairav Sharma	Kollam	Selected and Quit	Devana Sriya	Perambra	Selected from priority list
Seethalakshmi Prakash	Changanassery	Selected	Abhirami	Ernakulam	Eliminated
Sreebhuvan R	Alathur	Selected	Krishnasree M Biju	Kozhikode	Selected
Nehal V Ranjith	Edappal	Selected	Sreenanda J	Thiruvananthapuram	Selected
Gowri Krishna	Pattom	Eliminated	Akshith K Ajith	Thiruvananthapuram	Selected from Priority list
Adarsh P Harish	Tirur	Eliminated from standby	Jermi Jinu	Idukki	Eliminated
Krishnadiya Ajith	Bangalore	Selected	Nima Thajudheen	Thrissur	Selected
Trisha K Sajeev	Thrissur	Eliminated from Standby	Abhiram A	Kollam	Eliminated from priority list
PK Suryanarayanan	Karunagappalli	Selected	Vaiga S Nikesh	Kannur	Selected
MN Hana Fathim	Karunagappalli	Eliminated from Standby	Devananda M S	Kozhikode	Selected
Sneha Johnson	Thrissur	Selected	Mythili Shyam	Ernakulam	Eliminated from priority list
Soorya Mahadevan Pillai	Trivandrum	Selected	Devna C K	Kannur	Selected
Neha Chavra	Ernakulam	Eliminated from standby	Rihana	Coimbatore	Eliminated
Kishnasree	Kozhikode	Eliminated from standby	Sanjay	Kottayam	Eliminated
Sreehari PV	North Paravur	Selected	Sera Robin	Ernakulam	Eliminated from Priority
Vaishnavy KV	Chottanikkara	Selected	Amritha Varshini	Kozhikode	Selected
Jaiden Philip	Ettumanoor	Selected	Sreenand Vinod	Payyoli	Selected
Alenia Sebastian	Pala, Kerala	Selected	Theertha Subash	Palakkad	Selected
Devika Sumesh	Thrissur	Selected	Vanditha Vaidyamadham	Palakkad	Selected
Avantika Pramod	Vattiyoorkavu	Eliminated	Vaiga Lakshmi	Alappuzha	Selected
Thejus K	Irikkur	Selected	Ann Benson	Thiruvananthapuram	Selected
Gowri KR	Thrissur	Eliminated	Vishnupriya	Kozhikode	Eliminated from priority list
Adithyan Pradeep	Karunagappalli	Selected	Hrithik Jayakish	Kannur	Quit
Niharika Prem	Ottapalam	Eliminated	Megha Eldhose	Ernakulam	Eliminated from priority list
Aavani P Hareesh	Thodupuzha	Selected	Miya Essa Mehak	Ernakulam	Selected
Jermy Jinu	Moolamattom	Eliminated from Standby	Krishnajith	Kasargode	Selected from Priority list
			Krishnanunni	Thrissur	Eliminated from Priority list
Fidha Fathima	Vaikom	Eliminated from standby	Diya Rahman	Kollam	Selected
Rithu Raj	Cherukulam	Selected	Dhanika V S	Kollam	Eliminated from Priority list
Aditi Dinesh Nair	Bangalore	Selected	Navaneetha P	Kasargode	Eliminated from Priority list
Ananya Dinesh Nair	Bangalore	Wil️dcard Entry (Episode 13)	Sreehari N.M	Palakkad	Selected

Alensha P

Morayur

== Summaries ==
=== Season 1 ===
Order	Rounds								
Order	Auditions	Round 1	Round 2	Round 5	Quarter Finals	Semi Finals	Finals 1	Finals 2	Grand Finale
1	Sivani	Sreebhuvan	Seethalakshmi	Thejus	Vaishnavi.P	Thejus	Aditi Dinesh	Sneha	Seethalakshmi
2	Vaishnavi.P	Adithyan	Vaishnavi.P	Seethalakshmi	Thejus	Nehal	Rituraj	Thejus	Thejus
3	Theertha	Seethalakshmi	Rituraj	Nehal	Rituraj	Sneha	Thejus	Seethalakshmi	Vaishnavi P
4	Koushik	Aditi Dinesh	Nehal	Sooryamahadevan	Sneha	Rituraj	Seethalakshmi	Vaishnavi P	Aditi Dinesh
5	Jennifer	Suryanarayanan	Aditi Dinesh	Rituraj	Nehal	Sreebhuvan	Nehal	Rituraj	Sneha
6	P. Anand	Rituraj	Sooryamahadevan	Adithyan	Sreebhuvan	Seethalakshmi	Vaishnavi P	Nehal	Rituraj
7	Seethalakshmi	Vaishnavy KV	Vaishnavy KV	Vaishnavi.P	Sooryamahadevan	Vaishnavi P	Sreehari	Aditi Dinesh	Nehal
8	Sreebhuvan	Vaishnavi.P	Thejus	Ananya Dinesh	Seethalakshmi	Sooryamahadevan	Diya	Ananya Dinesh	Ananya Dinesh
9	Nehal	Sneha	Sreebhuvan	Koushik	Adithyan	Theertha	Sreebhuvan	Soorya Mahadevan	
10	Diya	Soorya Mahadevan	Ananya Dinesh	Sreebhuvan	Ananya Dinesh	Aditi Dinesh	Sooryamahadevan	Sreebhuvan	
11	Suryanarayanan	Thejus K	Koushik	Vaishnavy KV	Theertha	Koushik	Ananya Dinesh	Diya	
12	Sneha	Ananya Dinesh	Sneha	Aditi Dinesh	Koushik	Suryanarayanan	Sneha	Sreehari	
13	Soorya Mahadevan	Koushik	Adithyan	Theertha	Diya	Ananya Dinesh	Suryanarayanan		
14	Sreehari	Theertha	Suryanarayanan	Diya	Vaishnavy KV	Diya	Adithyan		
15	Vaishnavy KV	Alenia	Jaiden	Jaiden	Aditi Dinesh	Devika	Vaishnavi KV		
16	Jaiden	Jaiden	Diya	Sneha	Suryanarayanan	Sreehari	Sivani		
17	Alenia	Devika	Theertha	Sreehari	Jaiden	Sivani	Devika		
18	Devika	Diya	Sreehari	Devika	Devika	Adithyan	Koushik		
19	Rithuraj	Aavani	Aavani	Jennifer	Jennifer	Vaishnavi KV	Jaiden		
20	Thejus	Jennifer	Devika	Suryanarayanan	Sreehari	Avani	Theertha		
21	Adithyan	Sivani	Jennifer	Sivani	Sivani	Jaiden	Avani		
22	Aavani	Aavani	Sivani	Jennifer	Aavani	Jennifer			
23	Aditi Dinesh	Nehal	Alenia						
24	Ananya Dinesh	P.Anand							
25	Asna	Asna							
26	Aishwarya	Aishwarya							
27	Adarsh	Adarsh							
28	Trisha	Trisha							
29	Hana	Hana							
30	Neha	Neha							
31	Kishnasree	Kishnasree							
32	Jermy	Jermy							
33	Fidha	Fidha							
34	Gowri K								
35	Avantika								
37	Gowri KR								
36	Arunima								

Alensha P

The contestant received the highest score in a stage
Contestants who was kept in Waiting list after final Auditions
The contestant entered as a wildcard
The contestant was eliminated from the competition
The contestant was actually eliminated but saved by the judges
Contestants who quit the show

- After the auditions, it was revealed that none of the Waiting list contestants had made it into the competition
- In stage 1, Nehal V was actually eliminated as she got very low marks but was saved by the judges
- All 22 contestants in group stage was qualified into Quarter Finals and Semi Finals
- 21 contestants are qualIfied

=== Season 2 ===
Order	Rounds			
Order	Auditions	Round 1	Round 2	Round 3
1	Sreedev	Sreenand (92.55%)	Sreenand	Meghna (99.59%)
2	Asna	Hrithik (92.08%)	Ann Benson	Sreenand (99.02%)
3	Meghna	Devananda (87.14%)	Bevan Biju	Akshith (96.93%)
4	Hanoona	Bevan Biju(86.76%)	Devananda	Ann Benson (96.80%)
5	Bevan Biju	Hanoona (85.23%)	Miya	Krishnasree (96.61%)
6	Devana sriya	Ann Benson (85%)	Hanoona	Devanasreya (96.20%)
7	Krishnasree	Miya (84.64%)	Meghna	Miya (96.14%)
8	Sreenanda	Meghna (84.1%)	Sreehari	Bevan (95.73%)
9	Akshith	Devana sriya (83.83%)	Devanasreya	Hanoona (91.23%)
10	Nima	Akshith (83.63%)	Akshith	Sreehari (95.34%)
11	Vaiga S	Sreehari (82.73%)	Krishnasree	Devananda (95.32%)
12	Devananda	Krishnasree (80.35%)	Amruthavarshini	Vaigalakshmi (95.16%)
13	Devna CK	Amruthavarshini (79.22%)	Nima	Amruthavarshini (94.75%)
14	Amruthavarshini	Nima (78.86%)	Devna CK	Krishnajith (94.61%)
15	Sreenand	Devna CK (77.38%)	Krishnajith	Devna CK (93.18%)
16	Theertha	Vanditha (76.66%)	Vaigalekshmi	Sreenanda (92.43%)
17	Vanditha	Krishnajith (76.6%)	Sreedev	Asna (91.89%)
18	Vaigalakshmi	Sreenanda (75.41%)	Asna	Sreedev (91.52%)
19	Ann Benson	Theertha (75.29%)	Theertha	
20	Hrithik	Sreedev (74.88%)	Sreenanda	
21	Miya	Asna (74.82%)	Hrithik	
22	Krishnajith	Vaigalakshmi (74.44%)	Vanditha	
23	Diya	Vaiga S (71.48%)	Vaiga S	
24	Sreehari	Diya (72.67%)	Diya	

The contestant received the highest score in a stage
Contestants who quit the show
The contestant was eliminated from the competition

== Results ==
=== Main Set of Awards ===
Season	Winner	1st Runner Up	2nd Runner Up	3rd Runner Up	Popular Singer – Male	Popular Singer – Female	Ref.
1	Seethalakshmi Prakash	Thejus K	Vaishnavi Panicker	Aditi D. Nair	Rituraj	Ananya D. Nair	
2	Sreenand Vinod	Ann Benson	Akshith K. Ajith	N/A	-	Meghna Sumesh	
3	Nivedhitha	Muktika	Devanarayanan	N/A	N/A	N/A	
4	Droupadi Santhosh	Devananda Rajeev	Abin Krishna	Krishna VS	N/A	N/A	
5	Shiva Shankar Krishna	Nihara	Seba Moon	Arjitha Ratheesh	N/A	N/A	
6	Diya Rajith	Riyan Priyesh	Shriya Sojesh	Anushka Sarish	N/A	N/A	

=== Special Jury Awards ===
==== Season 1 ====
Contestant	Award
Nehal V Ranjith	Most consistent singer
Sneha Johnson	Gentle girl of Top singer
Sooryamahadevan	Gentleman of Top singer
Sreebhuvan R	Amazing Talent of Top singer
Krishnadiya Ajith	Enchanting Gulu
Sreehari P.V	Best Actor of Top singer
Devika Sumesh	Folk songs Queen of Top singer
Avani P Hareesh	Beauty Queen of Top singer
Suryanarayanan P.K	Bright Star of Top singer
Adithyan Pradeep	Amazing Natural Talent
Sivani B Sanjeev	Miss Innocence of Top singer
Vaishnavy K.V	Immini Valiya singer
Theertha Sathyan	Queen of Classical/Carnatic Music in Top singer
Jaiden Philip	Bhava Gayakan of Top singer
Koushik S Vinod	Rockstar of TOp singer

== Programme Structure ==
=== Rounds ===
Stage	Round 1	Round 2	Round 3	Round 4	Round 5
Stage 1	Devarajan Master Hits Round; Performance Round; Favorite Round	Vayalar Ramavarma Hits Round; Character Round; Favorite Round	Johnson Master Round; Family Round; Favorite Round		
Stage 2	Favorite Round; Vayalar – Devarajan Hits Round; Performance Round				
Stage 3		Favorite Round; Evergreen Hits Round; Family Round	Favorite Round; Dakshinamoorthy Swamy Hits Round; Performance Round	Favorite Round; P. Bhaskaran Hits Round; Performance Round	Favorite Round; Johnson Master Round; Black & White Performance Round
Stage 4	Favorite Round; Duet Round; Performance Round	Favorite Round; Vayalar Round; Performance Round			

=== Grading System ===
Each contestant is awarded a grade for each song based on their performance, by the judges. Also audience can cast votes to their favourite contestants through the official website of Flowers TV.

Grades	First awarded to
Golden Crown	Nehal V Ranjith
A Jackpot (special)	Vaishnavi Panicker
A Extreme	Sreebhuvan R
A Triple Wow	Nehal V Ranjith
A Double Wow	Koushik S Vinod
A Wow	Seethalakshmi Prakash
A Ultimate	Aditi Dinesh Nair
A Top	Aditi Dinesh Nair
A+	Adithyan Pradeep
A	Krishnadiya Ajith
B+	-Alensha P
