= Drushyam =

2014 film by Sripriya

- Theatrical release poster
- Directed by: Sripriya
- Written by: Paruchuri Brothers; 'Darling' Swamy
- Story by: Jeethu Joseph
- Based on: Drishyam by Jeethu Joseph
- Produced by: D. Suresh Babu; Rajkumar Sethupathi
- Starring: Venkatesh; Meena; Nadhiya; Kruthika Jayakumar; Esther Anil
- Cinematography: S. Gopal Reddy
- Edited by: Marthand K. Venkatesh
- Music by: Sharreth
- Production companies: Suresh Productions; Rajkumar Theatres Pvt Ltd; Wide Angle Creations
- Distributed by: Suresh Productions
- Release date: 11 July 2014
- Running time: 150 minutes
- Country: India
- Language: Telugu
- Budget: ₹6 crore
- Box office: ₹20 crore distributors' share

Drushyam (transl. Vision) is a 2014 Indian Telugu-language crime drama film directed by Sripriya and produced by D. Suresh Babu and Rajkumar Sethupathi. A remake of the 2013 Malayalam film Drishyam, the film stars Venkatesh, Meena, Esther Anil, and Kruthika Jayakumar. Venkatesh and Kruthika portray the roles played by Mohanlal and Ansiba Hasan in the original, whereas Meena and Esther reprises their roles. The film tells the story of Rambabu, a middle-class cable TV operator, and his family. They come under suspicion when Varun, the son of the Inspector-general of police (IG), goes missing soon after harassing Rambabu's daughter. The rest of the film reveals how Varun disappeared and what Rambabu does to keep his family from going to prison.

Sharreth composed the soundtrack, while the cinematography and editing were handled by S. Gopal Reddy and Marthand K. Venkatesh respectively. Principal photography commenced on 8 March 2014 and lasted 3 months. It was shot primarily in Kerala, like the original, and also took place in Araku, Simhachalam, Vizianagaram, and Hyderabad.

Drushyam released on 11 July 2014 to positive reviews from critics. It went on to become one of the highest-grossing Telugu films of the year, collecting a distributor's share of ₹200 million worldwide. A sequel titled Drushyam 2, a remake of Drishyam 2, was released in November 2021 on Amazon Prime Video.

== Plot ==
Rambabu is a cable network operator who lives in Rajavaram, a village located in the Araku region, with his wife Jyothi and their daughters – Anju, a twelfth-grade student, and Anu, who is in primary school. Through his job, Rambabu spends a lot of time watching films in multiple languages. He does so with much interest that it prompts him to take major life decisions by subconsciously taking on the behaviors of characters from these films.

During a school trip to a camp, a nude video of Anju is taken on a cell phone camera hidden in the bathroom. The culprit is revealed as Varun, the spoiled son of the Inspector-general of police, Geetha. When Varun meets Anju later to extort her for sexual favors, she breaks his cell phone and inadvertently kills him. With her mother's help, she hides his body in a compost pit that was originally made for manure. Unknown to them, this is witnessed by Anu. Jyothi tells Rambabu about the incident and he devises a plan to save his family from imprisonment. He gets rid of the broken cell phone. However, as he is disposing of Varun's car, Rambabu is seen by a corrupt police constable named Veerabhadra, who holds a grudge against him. Rambabu then takes his family out on a trip to Vizianagaram, where they attend a religious meeting, watch a movie and dine at a restaurant.

Meanwhile, Geetha starts an investigation when she realizes that her son has gone missing. After a preliminary investigation, Geetha calls Rambabu and his family in for questioning. Rambabu, predicting that this would happen, coaches his family on how to present their alibi. As a result, when questioned individually, their responses are consistent. They also produce the restaurant receipt, the movie tickets, and the tickets for the bus journey as proof of their alibi. The statements of the people who own the establishments that the family visited in Vizianagaram further solidify Rambabu's alibi. However, after a thorough investigation, Geetha realizes that Rambabu had acquired the tickets and the receipt on the day of the incident, made an acquaintance with the owners, and had only actually taken the trip a day later with his family.

Geetha arrests Rambabu and his family, and Veerabhadra uses force to beat the truth out of them. As Rambabu, Jyothi and Anju are severely injured, Geetha's husband, Prabhakar, asks her to put a stop to this. Out of fear, Anu reveals what she saw and Varun's friend describes the transgression at the camp. After digging up the compost pit, the police find the carcass of a pig instead of Varun's body, indicating that Rambabu had already moved it. Jyothi's brother, Rajesh, and her father call the media and Anu complains to them about Veerabhadra's ill-treatment of her family. After Veerabhadra manhandles Rambabu and his relatives, he is beaten by the local people who learn about him from the media. Rambabu's goodwill remains intact and all the locals extend their support to him. Veerabhadra is suspended, the remaining staff transferred, and Geetha resigns from her post as IG.

Before leaving for the United States, Geetha and Prabhakar meet Rambabu to apologize for their deeds and express their hope that Varun will return someday. But Rambabu indirectly tells them that he killed Varun to save his family and asks them to forgive him.

The film comes to an end with Rambabu signing a register at the newly constructed Rajavaram police station. As he leaves, a flashback shows him during the construction of the station with a shovel in hand, indicating that Varun's body is hidden in the building's foundation.

== Cast ==
- Venkatesh as Rambabu
- Meena as Jyothi
- Kruthika Jayakumar as Anju
- Esther Anil as Anu
- Nadhiya as IG Geetha Prabhakar
- Naresh as Prabhakar
- Ravi Kale as Constable Veerabhadram
- Roshan Basheer as Varun Prabhakar
- Sameer Hasan as SI Naveen Kumar
- Paruchuri Venkateswara Rao as Head Constable
- Saptagiri as Simhadri
- Chalapathi Rao as Jyothi's father
- Annapurna as Jyothi's mother
- Chaitanya Krishna as Rajesh
- Benerjee as New Sub Inspector
- Y. Kasi Viswanath as Restaurant Owner
- Uttej as Theatre Operator
- Chitram Srinu as Bus Owner Murali
- Jogi Naidu as Hotel Manager
- Kadambari Kiran as Bus Conductor
- Naidu Gopi as Hotel Babai

== Production ==
=== Development ===
Rajkumar Sethupathi acquired the rights to remake Jeethu Joseph's Malayalam film Drishyam (2013), which starred Mohanlal, Meena and Asha Sarath. Following Kamal Haasan's suggestion, Sethupathi chose Daggubati Venkatesh to play the lead role in the Telugu version. Haasan previously met Venkatesh in Goa and advised him to act in a film that challenges him as an actor. Venkatesh, along with his brother Daggubati Suresh Babu, then watched Drishyam. Suresh Babu joined Sethupathi as a co-producer, while Sripriya was approached to direct the film. This was Venkatesh's first collaboration with a female director. It was also his first non-commercial film. Based on Sripriya's and Sethupathi's previous collaboration with Suresh Balaje and George Pius's Wide Angle Creations (on Malini 22 Palayamkottai), the production house was given the contract for this film.

After Drishyam's Telugu remake was confirmed, Haasan called Venkatesh to tell him that he was happy that Venkatesh was going to play Mohanlal's role from the original. After considering other potential titles, Drushyam was finalised because of its relevance to the film's storyline. 'Darling' Swami and the Paruchuri brothers wrote the dialogues. The film had its formal launch ceremony on 21 February 2014 in Hyderabad. Sharreth composed the music. S. Gopal Reddy took charge of the film's cinematography and Marthand K. Venkatesh its editing. With this film, Suresh Productions completed its golden jubilee in Telugu cinema as a production and distribution company.

=== Casting ===
When I played Anu in the Malayalam version I found it very difficult, because the character is complex. However, it was easier when I did the Telugu one because I had done the same role once before. One of our associate directors happens to be a Malayali and he would write out my dialogues in Malayalam for me. Everybody else would help me with the pronunciation.

— Esther, in an interview with The Hindu in July 2014.

Meena reprised her role from the original, marking her comeback to Telugu cinema after sixteen years. It was her fifth collaboration with Venkatesh. She called her character "innocent, vulnerable, emotional, sweet, funny and strong all at the same time", adding that she was initially sceptical to play a mother to adolescents because Telugu film sensibilities were different from that of Malayalam ones, but accepted it due to the script's novelty. Nadhiya was selected to play Asha Sarath's role of a police officer from the original. She confirmed later that she would be playing an Inspector General of Police, which is a role she found being "almost like a role of a lioness that is trying to protect her family and yet is ferocious from the inside", calling it a "challenging and different" one.

A casting call was announced by Suresh Productions for the roles of Venkatesh's daughters in the film. They were looking for a girl aged 14–17 years to play the role of the elder daughter named Anjali, and another aged 8–12 years to play her younger sibling, Anu. Esther Anil was confirmed to reprise her role as the younger sister. Kruthika Jayakumar, a 17-year-old science student from Bangalore, was selected to play the role of elder sister in the film. This happened when a Malayalam filmmaker visited her dance performance in Thiruvananthapuram, and was struck by her expressions and photogenic features. He suggested that she pursue a career in the film industry. She referred to her character as a simple and vulnerable girl, who gets exploited. Her family is her world and she is particularly attached to her father. Kalabhavan Shajon was initially reported to reprise his role of a corrupt police officer from the original, but Ravi Kale was chosen instead.

Chaitanya Krishna confirmed his inclusion in the cast by the end of March 2014. In late April 2014, Naresh was chosen to play an important role in the film, which he later described as one of the best roles of his career. Roshan Basheer was selected to reprise the role of Varun, the son of the Inspector General of Police, in the remake. He did not feel that he was being typecast and he accepted the role, adding that it is not often that a Malayalam actor gets a chance to act in the Telugu films.

To play that character and portray a victim of exploitation was a good experience. It was a little easier for me to bring out those emotions on screen thanks to my training in dance, which teaches you to be in touch with yourself and express yourself.

— Kruthika Jayakumar, in an interview with The Hindu in July 2014.

=== Filming ===
During the pre-production phase, Venkatesh allocated bulk dates and the film's shoot was expected to be completed in a single schedule. Principal photography began in the locales of Kerala on 8 March 2014. Filming continued in the Idukki district of Kerala, where the original was primarily shot. The film's spokesperson told IANS that most of the film would be shot in Kerala, at locations similar to the original, except for a few scenes. Sripriya chose Kerala for two reasons – its greenery, and to avoid local interference from crowds that would ensue if shot in Andhra Pradesh, where Venkatesh is a star. After filming crucial scenes at a few villages near Kochi for more than three weeks, the film's unit shot at Araku and Simhachalam beginning mid April 2014. Subsequently, they planned to continue at Vizianagaram.

The film's shooting reached its final stages at Hyderabad in late May 2014, and the post-production phase began. A statement from the film's unit on 8 June 2014 stated that the principal photography had been wrapped up and post production work was under way, targeting a July 2014 release.

The violence in the pre-climax sequences was toned down to match the sensibilities of the Telugu audience after Venkatesh expressed scepticism as to whether the audience would accept him getting beaten up badly in the police station. During set construction for the police station and the house in the film, the producer and the director wanted to get rid of some coconut trees. However, art director Vivek managed to erect those sets without cutting down any trees.

== Soundtrack ==
Sharreth composed two songs for the film, with lyrics for both of them were penned by Chandrabose. The songs were released on 21 June 2014 by Lahari Music, through their official channel at YouTube.

Sandhya Rao of Sify stated in her review that the songs and background score "gel well with the film".

Track listing
| No. | Title | Artist(s) | Length |
|---|---|---|---|
| 1. | "Prati Roju Panduga Roje" | Karthik | 04:16 |
| 2. | "Nimisham Nimisham" | Madhu Balakrishnan | 06:14 |
| Total length: | | | 10:30 |

== Release ==
=== Theatrical ===
The film was initially planned to be released on or after 15 August 2014, to coincide with the Independence Day of India. The release plans were advanced to July 2014 because a lack of new releases that month provided an opportunity to cash in. The release date was later finalised as 11 July 2014. The final copy of the film was sent to the Central Board of Film Certification on 7 July 2014 for censoring.

A special preview was held two days before the film's release, on 9 July 2014, with the intention of getting feedback from trial audiences. It was hosted as an "Audience and Media Research screening" at a city multiplex in Hyderabad. This was a first-of-its-kind event in Telugu cinema.

=== Distribution ===
A press release on 6 July 2014 stated that Suresh Productions and iDream Media, a South Indian digital content and entertainment company, would distribute the film overseas. Errabus distributed the film in the United Kingdom. It released in London's renovated and then-full-digital East Ham Boleyn Cinema with a 7.1 sound system. The film was released on 64 screens across the United States, with premieres on 10 July 2014. It was also released in the overseas markets of Singapore, Malaysia and Tanzania in East Africa.

=== Marketing ===
The film's first look poster featured a photograph of Venkatesh, Meena, Kruthika Jayakumar and Esther with a police station in the backdrop. The title had the tag line "Kanipinchedantha Nijam Kaadu" (Visuals may be deceptive). A promotional campaign titled "My best memories with my father" was launched on 13 June 2014 by Venkatesh and his father D. Ramanaidu. Participants were directed to submit their best memories along with supporting pictures to a marketing page on Facebook, or via email, with the winner being granted an opportunity to meet Venkatesh in person. The film's team also invited Twitter users to upload photos of themselves with their fathers to celebrate "Fathers' Day Week", beginning 15 June 2014. A selfie featuring Venkatesh and his son Arjun was released as well.

More than a week later, on 22 June 2014, the filmmakers launched a jigsaw puzzle on Facebook as part of the film's promotion, featuring several scenes related to the film. The game enabled users to win prizes every day. The idea behind this jigsaw puzzle was to "escalate the drama and the suspense of the film". The film's theatrical trailer, 110 seconds long, was released on 3 July 2014. Around ₹30—40 million were spent on the film's promotions.

=== Home media ===
The film's satellite rights were sold to Gemini TV of Sun Network for ₹55 million in mid-July 2014. Suresh Babu revised the sale to ₹200 million, as a three film package including Gopala Gopala and Bhimavaram Bullodu, both co-produced by him. Drushyam had its global television premiere on 15 February 2015 at 6 p.m. IST. It registered a TRP rating of 18.61 which was reportedly one of the best ever in the history of Telugu cinema. In comparison, two other successful Telugu films of 2014, Race Gurram and Manam, which incidentally also aired on Gemini TV, registered a TRP rating of 15.6 and 15.7 respectively.

== Reception ==
=== Critical response ===
Ranjani Rajendra of The Hindu called the film a "compelling thriller that does not disappoint", adding that what the film "boils down to is two sets of parents desperate to ensure their children's wellbeing and makes for a good watch". Sandhya Rao of Sify stated, "For the first time in Telugu cinema do we see such an intense film. After a long time we are seeing a film that comes with nail-biting sequences. Superior performance, incredible screenplay and exhilarating suspense!" She called Drushyam a "highly recommended watch".

Suresh Kavirayani of Deccan Chronicle gave the film 3.5 out of 5 stars. He stated that the film is not "a regular song, dance and action entertainer. It is completely a screenplay-based film where every character plays an important role. The story showcases family bonding and also takes one on a thrilling ride", adding that the film's story "calls for some brilliant acting and the cast has done justice to their roles". Hemanth Kumar of The Times of India also gave the film 3.5 out of 5 stars and called it an "ode to classic style of filmmaking — clinical in its approach and hits just about the perfect notes to keep the audience hooked, without much gimmickry", adding that the film's biggest achievement is that it "respects our intelligence and reinforces the principle that story-telling isn't a dying art".

=== Box office ===
The film collected a distributor share of approximately ₹1.55 crore (US$160,000) at the AP/Telangana box office on its first day. It held strong on the second day, collecting almost 80% of the first day's share, resulting in a two-day total of ₹2.75 crore (US$290,000). By the end of its first weekend, Drushyam collected a total of approximately ₹4.65 crore (US$480,000) at the AP/Telangana box office. Trade analyst Trinath told IANS that the film in fact collected ₹5.23 crore (US$540,000) in its opening weekend.

In the United States, the film collected ₹0.451 crore (US$46,833) in two days, including preview shows, which trade analyst Taran Adarsh referred to as "a good start". By the end of its first weekend in the US, Drushyam collected a total of approximately ₹1.39 crore (US$144,341). With this, the film managed to surpass the second weekend collections of Bobby Jasoos (released a week earlier), but failed to beat the first weekend collections of Humpty Sharma Ki Dulhania (released on the same date).

By the end of its first week, the film collected ₹9.5 crore (US$990,000) nett at the global box office. At the ten-day mark, global collections rose to ₹13.1 crore (US$1.4 million), with ₹10.35 crore (US$1.1 million) earned at the AP/Telangana box office and the remaining ₹2.75 crore (US$290,000) from markets throughout the rest of India and overseas. The film collected a total share of ₹15.2 crore (US$1.6 million) at the global box office in two weeks and was declared "a hit venture". By the end of its lifetime, the film collected a total share of ₹20 crore (US$2.1 million) at the global box office and was declared "a super hit". With this, Drushyam became one of the highest grossing Telugu films of 2014.

=== Accolades ===
| Ceremony | Category | Nominee | Result |
|---|---|---|---|
| 62nd Filmfare Awards South | Best Film - Telugu | Daggubati Suresh Babu and Rajkumar Sethupathi | Nominated |
| 62nd Filmfare Awards South | Best Director - Telugu | Sripriya | Nominated |
| 62nd Filmfare Awards South | Best Actor - Telugu | Daggubati Venkatesh | Nominated |
| 62nd Filmfare Awards South | Best Supporting Actress – Telugu | Nadhiya | Nominated |
| 4th South Indian International Movie Awards | Best Actor – Telugu | Daggubati Venkatesh | Nominated |
| 4th South Indian International Movie Awards | Best Supporting Actress – Telugu | Nadhiya | Nominated |
| 4th South Indian International Movie Awards | Best Debutant Director – Telugu | Sripriya | Nominated |
| TSR – TV9 National Film Awards | Best Actor (Jury) | Daggubati Venkatesh | Won |
| TSR – TV9 National Film Awards | Best Actress (Jury) | Meena | Won |
| TSR – TV9 National Film Awards | Best Director (Jury) | Sripriya | Won |
| TSR – TV9 National Film Awards | Best Film | Daggubati Suresh Babu | Won |
| 13th Santosham Film Awards | Best Child Actor | Esther Anil | Won |

== Sequel ==
During the release of the original's sequel Drishyam 2 in February 2021, multiple news outlets reported that Jeethu Joseph met Venkatesh and Suresh Babu in Hyderabad a few days prior and that they were happy with the film and that they would join hands for a remake of Drishyam 2. On 20 February 2021, Jeethu Joseph announced that the remake Drushyam 2 has been finalised. Shooting began on 5 March 2021.
