= Madhu Balakrishnan =

Indian playback singer

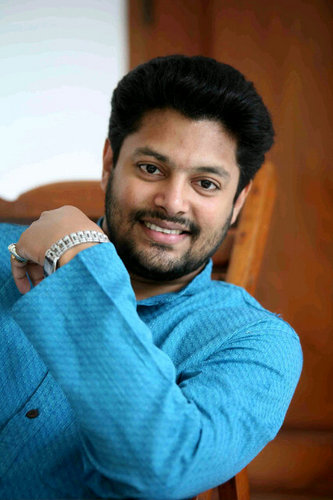
- Madhu in 2016

Background information
- Born: 24 June 1974 (age 52); North Paravur, Kerala, India
- Occupations: Singer; performer
- Years active: 1995–present
- Musical career
- Genres: Filmi; Classical; Carnatic; Bhajan
- Instrument: Vocals
- Label: Satyam Audios
- Award: Kalaimamani Award (2006)
- Website: Official website

Madhu Balakrishnan (born 24 June 1974) is an Indian playback singer who primarily sings in Malayalam. He has also sung songs in Tamil, Telugu, Kannada languages. He has sung over 10 thousand songs in films and several devotional albums.

== Personal life ==
Madhu Balakrishnan was born on 24 June 1974 to the late Balakrishnan (d. 1987) and Leelavathy at Paravur in Eranakulam. His earlier life was at Koratty, near Chalakudy, Thrissur. He completed his schooling in Mar Augustine Memorial Higher Secondary School, Koratty. He was inspired by his mother to take up music. Later he shifted to Paravur, his native place. He is married to Divya, elder sister of Indian cricketer S.Sreesanth. The couple has two sons - Madhav and Mahadev.

== List of songs ==
=== Devotional ===
Private album by Musical Bee Productions

Year	Song available on YouTube	Music director
2023	Anjanaiyin Arundhavamey Tamil	Pavan Kumar

Year	Song available on YouTube	Music director
2023	Jaya Jaya Ram Telugu	Pavan Kumar

=== Malayalam ===
Year	Film	Song title	Music director	Co-singers
1999	Udayapuram Sulthan	Kanakasabathalam	Kaithapram Damodaran Namboothiri	Solo Song
1999	Tokyo Nagarathile Viseshangal	Enthininnum	Sunny Stephen	H. Rajesh
1999	Tokyo Nagarathile Viseshangal	Sur Barsaaye Theri Sarod Se	Sunny Stephen	H. Rajesh
1999	Uthram Nakshatram	Poomanam Poothulanju	Sunny Stephen	Solo Song
1999	Rishivamsham	Orupadu Naalayi	Sanjeev Sabu	Solo Song
2000	Rapid Action Force	Paripoothamayoru Sruthithaalalayathe	Sailesh Narayanan	Solo Song
2000	O Priye	Nenjilottum Kiliye	Sidharth Vijayan	Solo Song
2000	O Priye	Padippura Vaathilile	Sidharth Vijayan	Solo Song
2001	Kabani	Punchavarambathoode	Vidydharan Master	Solo Song
2001	Kabani	Njanundu Neeyundu	Vidydharan Master	Solo Song
2001	Fort Kochi	Mohappaalppuzhayil	Jayan Pisharody	Solo Song
2001	Akashathile Paravakal	Moopparukkoru naalukettaal	S. Balakrishnan	Solo Song
2001	Akashathile Paravakal	Thathappenne	S. Balakrishnan	K. S. Chitra
2001	Jagapoga	Aanandathin Kallolangal	M. G. Radhakrishnan	Solo Song
2002	Valkannadi	Amme Amme	M. Jayachandran	Solo Song
2002	Kanmashi	Ambili Maamanumundallo	M. Jayachandran	Solo Song
2002	Yathrakarude Sradhakku	Nombarakkoottile	Johnson Master	Solo Song
2002	Bamboo Boys	Bamboo Boys	Thej Mervin	Chorus
2002	Sisiram	Paathira Poove	Berny–Ignatius	Solo Song
2003	Thilakam	Aare Aare Ariyan	Jerry Amaldev	K. S. Chitra
2003	Thilakam	Sankramam	Jerry Amaldev	Solo Song
2004	Perumazhakkalam	Chentharmizhi	M. Jayachandran	K. S. Chithra
2007	Rock n' Roll (film)	Manchadi Mazha	Vidyasagar	Sujatha
2008	Calcutta News (film)	Enguninnu vanna	Debojyoti Mishra	K. S. Chithra
2010	Yakshiyum Njanum	Vrindhavanamundo	Kaithapram	Solo Song
2011	Makeup Man	Aarutharum	Vidyasagar	Solo Song
2011	Sri Rama Rajyam	Jagadananda Karaka	Ilayaraja	Preetha P. V.
2017	Dhruvaraj Jagannath (DJ) (Telugu Dubbing) Duvvada Jagannadham	"Mayilo Kuyilo"	Devi Sri Prasad	Rajalakshmi Abhiram
2021	Home	Mukhiluthodanay	Rahul Subrahmanian	Solo Song
2023	Animal	Neeyanakhilam Thaathaa	Harshavardhan Rameshwar	Solo Song

=== Tamil ===
Year	Movie	Song title	Music director	Co-singers
1998	Ulavuthurai	Ullathai Thirandhu	Shah	K. S. Chitra
2000	Bharathi	Edhilum Ingu, Vande Mataram	Ilaiyaraaja	
2001	Aandan Adimai	Nammava, Thillu Mullu	Ilaiyaraaja	
2003	Parthiban Kanavu	Kana Kandenadi	Vidyasagar	
2003	Pithamagan	Piraye Piraye	Ilaiyaraaja	
2004	Madurey	Kanden Kanden	Vidyasagar	Sadhana Sargam
2004	Bose	Vaitha Kann	Yuvan Shankar Raja	Sri Vardhini
2005	Ji	Ding Dong	Vidyasagar	Madhushree
2005	Raam	Yaaro Arival	Yuvan Shankar Raja	
2005	Majaa	Sollitharava	Vidyasagar	Sadhana Sargam
2005	Chandramukhi	Konja Neram	Vidyasagar	
2006	Mozhi	Pesa Madandhaiye	Vidyasagar	
2006	Sivappathigaram	Aatrai Thingal	Vidyasagar	Sujatha
2006	Paramasivan	Thangakili, Oru Kili	Vidyasagar	
2006	Manathodu Mazhaikalam	Aayiram Vaanavil	Karthik Raja	
2007	Pori	Perundhil Nee	Dhina	Madhushree
2007	Arputha Theevu	Saama Mohini	M. Jayachandran	Sujatha
2008	Raman Thediya Seethai	Ippave Ippave	Vidyasagar	Harini
2008	Abhiyum Naanum	Vaa Vaa En Devathaiye	Vidyasagar	
2009	Naan Kadavul	Pichai Paathiram	Ilaiyaraaja	
2013	Paradesi	Sengaade	G. V. Prakash Kumar	
2014	3 Geniuses	"Azhago"	Aathish Uthriyan	
2015	Komban	"Mella Valanjadhu"	G. V. Prakash Kumar	
2022	Kaari	"Goppamavaney"	D. Imman	Kailash Kher
2023	Thiruvin Kural	Appa En Appa	Sam C. S.	
2025	Vanangaan	Irai Nooru	G. V. Prakash Kumar	
2025	Dinasari	Seiginra Velaiyil	Ilayaraja	

=== Kannada ===
Year	Movie	Song title	Music director	Co-singers
2002	Tavarige baa tangi	Thangi Ninna	Hamsalekha	Solo
2002	Hoo Anthiya Uhoo Anthiya	Chanda ee chanda	Karthik Raja	Solo
2002	Ninagagi	Hani Hani Seri	Gurukiran	K. S. Chithra
2002	Ekangi	Nee Yekangiyagamma	Ravichandran	Solo
2004	Apthamitra	Kana Kanade	Gurukiran	Solo
2005	Thavarina Siri	Baalina Beedi, Preethi Namma	Hamsalekha	
2008	Aramane	Nanna Edeyalli	Gurukiran	Solo

=== Telugu ===
Year	Movie	Song title	Music director	Co-singers
2004	Chandramukhi	Kontha kaalam Kontha kaalam	Vidyasagar	Sujatha Mohan
2004	Saptagiri	Naa Daari Godaranta	Ramana Gogula	--
2011	Shirdi Sai	Sharanu sharanu	M.M. Keeravani	Sunitha
2007	Sri Ramadasu	Charanamule nammithi	M.M. Keeravani	K. S. Chithra
2015	Lion (2015 film)	Anaganaga astami lo	Mani Sharma	
2024	Satyam Sundaram (2024 Film)	Evaro ithanevaro	Govind Vasantha	

== Television ==
  - All shows are in Malayalam television unless noted

Reality shows as Judge

Year	Show	channel
2012	Super star global	Amrita TV
2019– 2020	Top Singer 1	Flowers TV
2021– 2022	Top Singer 2	Flowers TV
2023– 2024	Sa Re Ga Ma Pa Keralam	Zee Keralam
2024	Musical wife Grand Finale Chapter 4	Flowers TV
2024	Top Singer 4	Flowers TV
2024– 2025	Top Singer 5	Flowers TV
2025– 2026	Top Singer 6	Flowers TV
2026- present	Top Singer 7	Flowers TV

Malayalam Television series title song

Year	Movie	Song title	Music director	Channel
2004	Chitta	"Kalpadarakombil"	S.Somasekharan Nair	Surya TV
2006	Veendum Jwalayayi	"Jwalayayi"	M. Jayachandran	DD Keralam
2006	Unniyarcha	"chekavarkku"	Mohan Sithara	Asianet
2006	Swami Ayyappan (TV series)	" Sabarimaamala Vaazhumayyappa"	S.Somasekharan Nair	Asianet
2008	Sreekrishna Leela	"Sreekrishna leelamrutham"	S.Somasekharan Nair	Asianet
2008	sreemahabhagavatham	"Shyama Hare"	S.Somasekharan Nair	Asianet
2008	Devimahathmyam	"Devimahathmyam"	S.Somasekharan Nair	Asianet
2008	Thulabharam	"Neethidevathe"	S.Somasekharan Nair	Surya TV
2009	Swami Ayyappan Saranam		S.Somasekharan Nair	Asianet
2012	Sabarimala Sreedharmashastha		S.Somasekharan Nair	Asianet
2012	Sripadmanabham	"Om Shri Padmanabha"	Perumbavoor G. Raveendranath	Amrita TV
2015	Sathyam Shivam Sundaram	"Kailasasringathil"	S.Somasekharan Nair	Amrita TV
2018	Kumarasambhavam	"Saravana Poikayil"	S.Somasekharan Nair	Amrita TV
2021	Kanyadanam (Malayalam TV series)	"nattu nanchu varthiya"	Syam Dharman	Surya TV

== Awards ==
- 2002 - Kerala State Film Award for Best Singer for the song "Amme Amme" from the film Valkannadi
- 2006 - Tamil Nadu State Film Award for Best Male Playback Singer
- 2006 - Kalaimamani Awardfor excellence in music, dance, cinema and art conferred by the Tamil Nadu state government.
- 2008 -Asianet Television Awards for Best Singer - Swamy Ayyappan
- 2011 -Asianet Television Awards for Best Singer- Devimahatmyam
- 2017 - Honorary Doctorate from The International Tamil University, USA
- 2024 - Film Critics Award

Best playback singer Male (Malayalam) for kanchana kannezhuthi song from movie Njanum pinne oru njanum by Rajasenan
