= Meenakshi Anoop =

Indian actress, Television host(born 2005)

- Born: Anunaya Anoop; 12 October 2005 (age 21); Kidangoor, Kottayam, Kerala
- Other name: Baby Meenakshi
- Occupations: Actor; TV host
- Years active: 2014–present

Anunaya Anoop (born 12 October 2005), better known by her stage name Meenakshi Anoop, is an Indian actress and television presenter who works primarily in the Malayalam film industry. She is best known for her role as Fathima (Pathu/Pathumma) in the 2015 comedy film Amar Akbar Anthony and Nandinikkutty (Nandini) in the 2016 crime thriller Oppam.

== Early life and education ==
Meenakshi was born as Anunaya at Kidangoor in the Kottayam district of Kerala to Anoop R., a computer accountant, and Remya. She studied at NSS Higher Secondary School in Kidangoor and thereafter at MGM NSS Higher Secondary School in Lakkattoor. She is pursuing her graduation in English at St. Mary's College, Manarcaud.

== Career ==
Meenakshi started her acting career with a short film Madhura Nombaram directed by Akhil S. Kiran.

She made her film debut in Arun Kumar Aravind's 1 by Two (2014), though her scenes were not included in the film. She then went on to act in 1000 – Oru Note Paranja Katha, Jamna Pyari, and Aana Mayil Ottakam, all of which released in 2015. She made her breakthrough portraying Fathima (Pathu/Pathumma) in Amar Akbar Anthony (2015). International Business Times stated about her performance, "The child artist has been receiving amazing responses from the audience and is undoubtedly loved by everyone for her innocent and natural acting." She also received the Asianet Film Award for Best Child Artist for her performance.

She acted in the Priyadarsan movie Oppam, as Nandhini kutty and signed on to act in upcoming films such as Zacharia Pothen Jeevichirippundu.

Her film debut in languages other than Malayalam include, Kavacha in Kannada and The Body in Hindi.

== Filmography ==
- All films are in Malayalam, unless otherwise noted.

Key
†	Denotes films that have not yet been released

Year	Film	Role	Notes
2015	1000 – Oru Note Paranja Katha		
2015	Aana Mayil Ottakam		
2015	Amar Akbar Anthony	Fathima	
2015	Jamna Pyari	School girl	
2016	Oppam	Nandini	
2016	Oru Muthassi Gadha	Street singer	Cameo
2016	Marupadi		Cameo
2016	Paulettante Veedu		
2016	Kolumittayi	Riya	
2017	Alamara		
2017	Sadrishyavakyam 24:29		
2017	Zacharia Pothen Jeevichirippundu		
2018	Puzhayamma	Mazha	
2018	Mohanlal	Young Meenakshi	
2018	Queen	Bride's sister	
2019	Vishudha Pusthakam		
2019	Kavacha	Nandhini	Kannada film
2019	The Body	Isha	Hindi film
2021	Meezan	Ponnus	
2021	The Creator		
2021	Ameera	Ameera	
2021	Kakkapponnu	Megha	
2023	Class By a Soldier	Gayathri	
2024	Poyyamozhi		
2025	Officer on Duty	Nila Hari	
2025	Prìvate	Ashitha	
2026	Poovu	Yama Jeevan	
2026	Juniors Journey		

== Television ==
Year	Program	Role	Channel	Notes
2018– present	Top Singer	Host	Flowers TV	
2020–2021	Top Singer Music Night	Host	Flowers TV	
2021	Eenangalude Gandharvan	Host	Flowers TV	
2023	Samthwana Sangeetham	Host	Flowers TV	
