= Brahmāstra: Part One – Shiva =

2022 Indian film by Ayan Mukerji

- Theatrical release poster
- Directed by: Ayan Mukerji
- Screenplay by: Ayan Mukerji
- Dialogues by: Hussain Dalal
- Story by: Ayan Mukerji
- Produced by: Karan Johar; Apoorva Mehta; Hiroo Yash Johar; Namit Malhotra; Ayan Mukerji; Ranbir Kapoor; Marijke DeSouza
- Starring: Amitabh Bachchan; Ranbir Kapoor; Alia Bhatt; Mouni Roy; Nagarjuna
- Cinematography: V. Manikandan; Pankaj Kumar; Sudeep Chatterjee; Vikash Nowlakha; Patrick Duroux
- Edited by: Prakash Kurup
- Music by: Pritam
- Production companies: Dharma Productions; Prime Focus Studios (Note: Serves as the producer of and provider for the film's visual effects.); Starlight Pictures; Magic Wand Films
- Distributed by: Star Studios
- Release date: 9 September 2022
- Running time: 167 minutes
- Country: India
- Language: Hindi
- Budget: ₹375–400 crore
- Box office: est. ₹401.7–431 crore

Brahmāstra: Part One – Shiva (pronounced [bɾəɦmaːstrə]; stylized as BRAHMĀSTRA) is a 2022 Indian Hindi-language fantasy action adventure film (Note: Sources that state fantasy action-adventure to be the film's genre:) written and directed by Ayan Mukerji. The film is the first installment of a planned trilogy, which is itself planned to be part of a cinematic universe titled Āstraverse, and stars an ensemble cast including Amitabh Bachchan, Ranbir Kapoor, Alia Bhatt, Mouni Roy and Nagarjuna with Shah Rukh Khan in a special appearance. This is the first film of real-life couple Ranbir Kapoor and Alia Bhatt together. Drawing inspiration from tales in Hindu mythology, the story follows Shiva, an orphaned musician with pyrokinetic powers who discovers that he is an astra, a weapon of enormous energy. He attempts to prevent the strongest of the astras, the Brahmāstra, from falling into the hands of dark forces that share a history with him.

The film was first conceived by Mukerji in 2011, with core elements inspired by Indian history and stories he heard in his childhood. Its development was first revealed in July 2014 with a planned release for 2016, but its official announcement arrived in October 2017 revealing that the film would be titled Brahmāstra and would be a trilogy. Principal photography lasted from February 2018 to March 2022, with filming locations including Bulgaria, London, New York City, Edinburgh, Thailand, Manali, Mumbai and Varanasi. Production and release of the film were delayed multiple times, first due to monetary constraints, and later due to the COVID-19 pandemic. The film's songs are composed by Pritam, with soundtrack lyrics written by Amitabh Bhattacharya.

Brahmāstra: Part One – Shiva was theatrically released on 9 September 2022 by Star Studios. The film received mixed reviews from critics, with praise towards cast performances (particularly Kapoor, Bhatt, Bachchan, Roy and Nagarjuna), action sequences, visual effects, scale, music, ambition and Khan's special appearance, though criticism was directed towards the dialogues, screenplay, characterization, and storyline. It emerged as the highest-grossing Hindi film of 2022 and the sixth highest-grossing Indian film of 2022. Both a circumquel and a sequel are in development. Initially planned for a Christmas 2026 and Christmas 2027 release respectively, production of both films has been deferred due to developmental delays and scheduling conflicts of both the lead actors, specifically Kapoor's.

== Plot ==
In ancient India, sages in the Himalayas encounter the energy Brahm-shakti, which creates powerful celestial weapons called astras. The strongest, the Brahmāstra, can destroy the world. The sages use their astras to control it and form the Brahmansh, a secret society dedicated to protecting the world from their power.

In present-day Mumbai, Shiva, a DJ, falls in love with Isha Chatterjee, a London resident visiting India for the Durga Puja festival at her grandfather's pandal. Isha reciprocates, and Shiva tells her that he is an orphan who never knew his father and whose mother died in a fire when he was a baby. Meanwhile, in Delhi, Brahmānsh member and scientist Mohan Bhargav is attacked by Zor and Raftar, who seek the piece of the Brahmāstra he protects. Mohan uses the Vānarāstra to fight back, but Junoon, serving the mysterious evil Dev, subdues him using the Vash Mukut. Under Junoon's control, Mohan reveals that the second piece is protected in Varanasi by artist and archaeologist Anish Shetty. Before revealing the location of the Brahmānsh headquarters (Ashram) and its guru, Mohan kills himself by jumping from a balcony.

Shiva has a vision of Mohan's confrontation with Junoon and discovers that he is connected to a piece of the Agneyāstra. He and Isha travel to Varanasi to warn Anish, but Raftar attacks them with the Vānarāstra. Anish defeats him with the Nandi Āstra and escapes with Shiva and Isha. While travelling towards Himachal Pradesh, where Ashram is located, they are pursued by Junoon and Zor. Anish gives Shiva the second piece of the Brahmāstra and stays behind to fight their pursuers, but is killed. Shiva and Isha continue to Ashram, pursued by Raftar. When Raftar attempts to kill Isha, Shiva uses his fire powers to kill him.

At Ashram, Shiva learns about the astras and is persuaded by guru Raghu to join the Brahmansh in exchange for information about his parents. He meets fellow recruits Rani, Raveena, Sher and Tenzing, and trains to control his powers, eventually mastering fire. As Junoon approaches, Raghu reveals that Shiva is the son of former Brahmansh members Dev and Amrita. Dev awakened the Brahmāstra, having the unique ability to control multiple astras. His pregnant wife Amrita, wielder of the Jalāstra, defeated him in battle on a remote island, where both seemingly perished. Amrita's boat was recovered from the ruins with two broken pieces of the Brahmāstra, which were entrusted to Mohan and Anish. The third piece was believed missing, leading Raghu and Shiva to conclude that Dev and Amrita had survived.

The third piece is hidden within Amrita's Mayāstra, disguised as a conch shell. Raghu releases it by placing Shiva's blood on the shell. Junoon and her forces then attack Ashram and take everyone hostage. Shiva defeats Junoon and kills Zor, who now wields Anish's Nandi Āstra, freeing the hostages. However, Junoon takes the third piece from Isha and seemingly sacrifices herself to activate the Brahmāstra. As it begins destroying the world and Isha is endangered, Shiva's love and determination to protect her allow him to control the weapon. He reunites with Isha as the destruction is halted.

In the post credits scene, Junoon's activation of the Brahmāstra frees Dev, who had been imprisoned as a statue on an unknown island.

== Cast ==
- Amitabh Bachchan as Raghu aka 'Guruji', the guru of Brahmānsh, who is also their leader and wields the Prabhāstra
- Ranbir Kapoor in a dual role as
  - Shiva, Amrita and Dev's son; an orphan and newly recruited member of the Brahmānsh, who possesses the Agniastra (the astra of fire) within himself
    - Nivaan Gupta as baby Shiva
  - Dev, Amrita's husband and Shiva's father; a leader member of the Brahmānsh who wielded the Agniastra (uncredited cameo appearance)
- Alia Bhatt as Isha Chatterjee; an NRI from London, Shiva's girlfriend
- Mouni Roy as Junoon, Dev's right–hand woman who wields the Kavachāstra and aims to revive the Brahmāstra and release Dev
- Nagarjuna as Anish Shetty; an artist, architect, archaeologist and a member of the Brahmānsh who wielded the Nandi Āstra
- Dimple Kapadia as Savitri Devi, a member of Brahmānsh
- Gurfateh Pirzada as Sher, a new recruit of Brahmānsh who wields the Nāg Dhanush
- Stanzin Delek as Tensing, a new recruit of Brahmānsh who wielded the Pawanāstra
- Lehar Khan as Raveena, a new recruit of Brahmānsh who wields the Gajāstra
- Aditi Joshi as Rani, a new recruit of Brahmānsh who possesses Āyu Madrikā
- Markand Soni as Santha, a new recruit of Brahmānsh and its tech guy who wields the Chakravathāstra (Dagger of Resurrection)
- Saurav Gurjar as Zor, a henchman of Junoon who stole the Nandi Āstra from Anish
- Rouhallah Gazi as Raftaar, another henchman of Junoon who stole the Vanarāstra from Mohan
- Chaitanya Sharma as Tiger, Shiva's friend
- Saqib Ayub as Ali, Shiva's friend
- Rashi Mal as Shaina, Isha's cousin
- Rohan Rustomji as Sunny, Isha's cousin
- Farida Dadi as Aunty, Shiva's landlady
- Riyaaz Makaney as Isha's grandfather
- Shah Rukh Khan as Mohan Bhargav, a renowned scientist and a member of the Brahmānsh who wielded the Vanarāstra (special appearance)
- Deepika Padukone as Amrita, Dev's wife and Shiva's mother; a former member of the Brahmānsh who wielded the Jalāstra (uncredited cameo appearance)

== Production ==
=== Development ===
The idea of Brahmāstra: Part One – Shiva first came to Mukerji in 2011 while writing the script for his second film Yeh Jawaani Hai Deewani (2013). Mukerji first announced that he was working on a new project in July 2014. In October 2017, Brahmāstra was officially announced by producer Karan Johar. Mukerji was signed as the director while Ranbir Kapoor, Alia Bhatt and Amitabh Bachchan were set to star. Initially, the film's working title was Dragon, but was officially titled as Brahmāstra in 2017. Mukerji explained that the title Brahmāstra "resonates with the ancient wisdom, energies and power." Mukerji also revealed that it is a "contemporary film with ancient elements." In 2017, Johar revealed his plan to make the film into a film trilogy. The preparation for the film started in January 2018.

In an interview, Kapoor stated that Mukerji "has spent six years of his life working really hard to make an original story" and that the trilogy would be made over a period of 10 years and refuted rumours suggesting that it is a romantic superhero film. Instead, Kapoor confirmed that the film is a "romantic fairytale in a supernatural format" and that the film is not something which "doesn't have truth to it, or which is unbelievable". Telugu film actor Nagarjuna also confirmed that he would be playing a "pivotal" role and it marked his return to Hindi cinema after 19 years, following his appearance in 2003 film LOC: Kargil. Mouni Roy revealed in an interview that she is the "only antagonist" in the film.

In June 2022, Mukerji announced the film would be a part of a trilogy franchise – serving as the first instalment – under the Astraverse, a cinematic universe centred around various mystical astras. In August 2022, Roy confirmed Shah Rukh Khan had a cameo appearance in the film. Khan reprises his character from the film Swades (2004).

=== Pre-production ===
Mukerji started work 9 years before the theatrical release. Pre-production work started in 2014 and filming began in 2018. In February 2018, Bachchan and Kapoor did look tests in the presence of Mukerji.

=== Themes ===
In July 2022, a video was released featuring Mukerji explaining the mystical universe of various astras. He explained how from the Brahm-Shakti, astras were born, which compose all the different energies that are found in nature like Jalāstra (water), Pawanāstra (wind), and Agnyastra (fire). He also talked about astras that store the powers of different animals like the Vanarāstra, which can give the power of a "divine" monkey to the person who controls it, and the Nandiāstra, which contains the power and strength of a thousand bulls, within itself. The last āstra to emerge from the universe, carrying the collective power of the Brahm-Shakti – called the "lord of all the āstras" – is explained to be one of the most powerful celestial weapons of gods (or Devas) in Hindu mythology, the Brahmāstra. Mukerji stated that the core idea was inspired by stories of Hindu mythology he heard in his childhood from his grandfather. Kapoor described the film as an action-adventure about a DJ named Shiva and his journey with his ladylove Isha, and finally something that leads him to his destiny which is the Brahmāstra.

=== Characters ===
Mukerji revealed that the inspiration behind actor Kapoor's character came from Rumi's phrase "love is the bridge between you and everything", to build the foundation of the film. The character initially had long hair; later, he revealed that the look was scrapped and Kapoor had gotten a haircut instead. Kapoor revealed his experience with look tests for the film, expressing that it is a "tedious job: sticking, removing applying, de-applying, and applying again, until some decision is reached".

=== Filming ===
Principal photography began in February 2018 with the commencement of the first schedule of the film on 24 February 2018. The first schedule of the film was wrapped up in Bulgaria on 24 March 2018. The second schedule of filming continued in said country and then London on 8 July 2018, in New York in late July, and then back in Bulgaria by the end of the month. Extensive shooting started on 1 February 2019 at Edinburgh, Scotland. The 20-day schedule started in the Ramnagar Fort and Chet Singh Fort in Varanasi on 30 July 2019. The filming was halted in March 2020 due to the COVID-19 pandemic, and later resumed in November 2020. Filming wrapped up on 29 March 2022 in Varanasi. After S. S. Rajamouli's father V. Vijayendra Prasad, proposed some changes in the film to Mukerji, reshoots were conducted for four days.

It was reported that the production budget for the film was ₹410 crore (US$44 million), which would make it one of the most expensive Indian films and the most expensive Hindi film ever at the time of its release. However, the lead actor Ranbir Kapoor later clarified that the reported budget was for production of all three main instalments of the franchise, and the assets built during the production of the first film will be used in future instalments.

=== Post-production ===
In the post-production, it is estimated that 150 crore rupees were spent on VFX by makers. The VFX work was done by DNEG – Prime focus company. Editing was supervised by Prakash Kurup. Jam8 music and sound design studio, led by Pritam, provided sound effects. DNEG and ReDefine's foreign team created visual effects. Chiranjeevi did the voice-over for the Telugu version. Ranbir and Alia dubbed for their portions in September 2020 in a studio in Bandra.

== Music ==
Pritam composed the soundtrack while composing the background score along with Prasad Shaste, Jim Satya, Meghdeep Bose, Tanuj Tiku & Ketan Sodha, while the songs are produced and mixed by British musician Steel Banglez, with lyrics written by Amitabh Bhattacharya. The score was recorded at Synchron Stage Vienna. The song "Rasiya" was sung by singer Tushar Joshi.. The song Kesariya was sung by singer Arijit Singh.

The film's titular soundtrack album was officially released on 6 October to streaming formats and digital retailers, coinciding with the occasion of Dussehra.

== Marketing ==
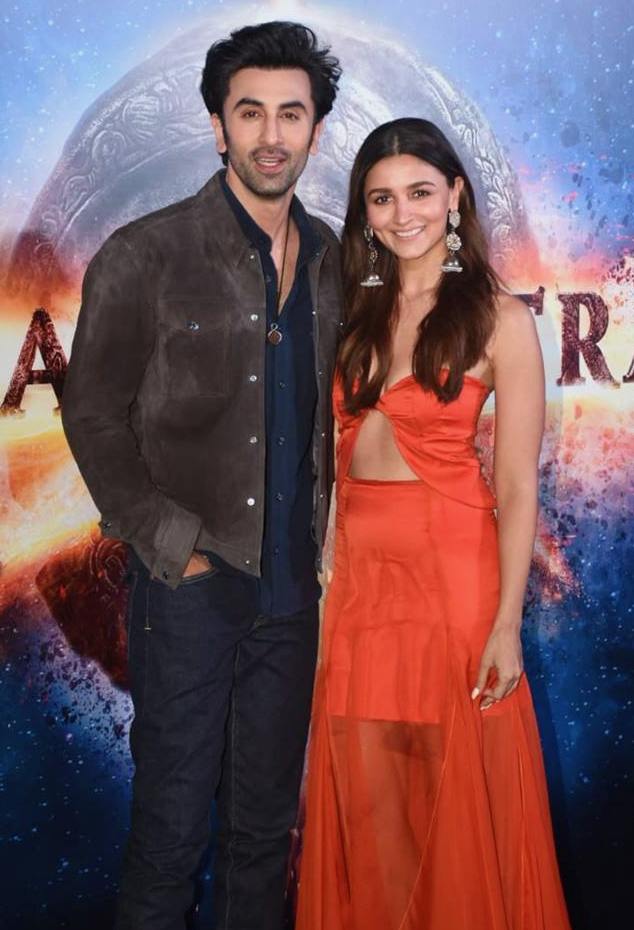
Kapoor and Bhatt at the unveiling event of Kapoor's character, Shiva, in December 2021

On 4 March 2019, the title logo of the film was unveiled at Prayagraj's Kumbh Mela on Mahashivratri. 150 drones were used to light the sky up to form the logo and title of the movie. The official logo of Brahmāstra was released on the web two days later, while SS Rajamouli – who later served as the film's presenter for its South Indian language versions – and Dhanush presented it in the Telugu and Tamil versions respectively. A forty-second motion logo was also released, with Bachchan's voiceover in it. In the following weeks, promotional behind-the-scenes videos of the making of the music score for the motion logo, featuring the film's music composer Pritam, and the execution of the title logo's unveiling in the sky, were released.

The following month however, Ayan Mukerji announced the postponement of the release to 2020, and the film logo was deleted from YouTube.

The motion poster of the film with Ranbir Kapoor featuring his character, Shiva, was released on 15 December 2021, while a fan event in support of the poster launch was held in New Delhi, broadcast live by the film's streaming partner, Disney+ Hotstar, on its platform and social media. The poster also announced the release date of part one of the trilogy as 9 September 2022. This was followed by an event in Hyderabad where the Telugu, Tamil, Malayalam and Kannada versions of the motion poster were released.

The film was seen as one of the most anticipated Hindi releases of 2022.

On Alia Bhatt's birthday, 16 March 2022, a poster and the first prologue of her character, Isha, were released. Mukerji, Kapoor and Bhatt were featured in the Byju's "Cricket Live" segment of the post cricket show during the inaugural IPL 2022 game, and Kapoor appeared and announced the game in a television commercial.

A promotional announcement video commemorating the film's wrap was released on 29 March 2022.

On 31 May 2022, the film's teaser trailer was released, which also unveiled the release date of the official trailer; an event and fan "meet-and-greet" was held in Visakhapatnam in support of its release. The first-look posters of Bachchan's character, Guru, Nagarjuna's character, Anish, and Mouni Roy's character, Junoon, were released in June.

On 13 June 2022, an announcement video was released, revealing that actor Chiranjeevi will be lending his voice to Kapoor's character, Shiva, for the film's Telugu dubbed version.

A preview screening of the film's trailer was held a day prior to its official release on 15 June 2022 at an event in Mumbai, followed by its 4K version release.

On 13 July 2022, a promotional featurette titled "The Vision of Brahmāstra", featuring Mukerji explaining the mystical universe of various āstras named as Astraverse and the creative vision behind it, was released.

The first single of the film's soundtrack, titled "Kesariya" was shared by Mukerji on his Instagram page on 10 April 2022. The song's motion poster featured Kapoor and Bhatt's characters, and Mukerji's post was seen to be hinting at the actors' real-life wedding. A day before their wedding on 14 April, Mukerji posted the teaser of the song on his Instagram as a wedding gift for the couple. The teaser of the song's Telugu version, titled "Kumkumala", sung by Sid Sriram, was presented by Rajamouli in May. The music video was formally released on 17 July on Sony Music India's YouTube account, after being unveiled in a livestream hosted by Bhatt and Mukerji on Instagram, in which they also discussed on the making of the track.

On 31 July 2022, an Instagram filter featuring visuals of various āstras, was released.

On 6 August 2022, a featurette was released featuring Mukerji sharing his complete journey and process till Part One – Shiva from the beginning of his vision for the Brahmāstra film trilogy. A 3D preview screening of the second song from the film's soundtrack, "Deva Deva", sung by Singh, was held in Mumbai that day as well, two days before the single's release.

In the second week of August, hoardings of the film's songs were held up in New York City and LA to promote an "afterparty" livestream, which took place on 18th, exclusively via YouTube Premium – on Sony Music India's channel. The live stream was in support of the film's third song, "Dance Ka Bhoot" – with Mukerji, Kapoor and Bhatt interacting with fans and discussing the film's music, production, and promotional campaign. A poster of Kapoor's character, featuring a snippet of the song's background music as well as teasing the music video, was released.

On 24 August 2022, a promotional event in support of the film was held in Chennai, led by Kapoor, Rajamouli, and Nagarjuna.

On 27 August 2022, a promotional summit as well as another "meet-and-greet" was held at IIT Bombay, with Kapoor and Bhatt.

On 30 August 2022, a clip featuring an excerpts of Kapoor's character, Shiva, from the film was shared, as part of a ten-day countdown – which ran from 30 August to 8 September – to the film's release. Another clip was released as part of the countdown, featuring Bachchan's character, Guru, the following day, with Mukerji stating he chose 9 September 2022 as the release date as he believes nine is his lucky number.

Kapoor and Bhatt co-starred together in an advertisement campaign of Spotify India, which was released in association with the film, featuring two of the film's songs, "Kesariya" and "Dance Ka Bhoot".

On 1 September 2022, Telugu, Tamil and Kannada versions of the "Vision of Brahmāstra" featurette, featuring Rajamouli explain the Astraverse's themes, were released. The film's release countdown continued with a clip introducing the Vānarāstra, released the same day, with media outlets speculating it to be part of Shah Rukh Khan's confirmed cameo appearance.

On 3 September 2022, a pre-release promo was released in Hindi, Telugu and Tamil to announce the opening of advance bookings for tickets in theatres.

On 4 September, a featurette of the film's action sequences and their filming and choreography, was shared.

On 6 September 2022, a 3D exclusive fan preview screening of the film was announced, which was held in Mumbai the day before the film's release, on 8 September with Kapoor, Bhatt, and Mukerji. Tickets were available via PVR Cinemas' web store, and sold out within minutes of the announcement. A fan-meet and press conference with Mukerji, Kapoor, and Bhatt was also held in New Delhi to promote the film.

== Release ==
=== Theatrical ===
Brahmāstra: Part One – Shiva was released on 9 September 2022, in standard formats, 3D, IMAX 3D, and 4DX 3D. The film was released by Star Studios in India in Hindi, Tamil, Telugu, Malayalam, and Kannada languages, with Telugu film director S. S. Rajamouli presenting the dubbed versions in the latter four South Indian languages. It is the first film released under the Star Studios name following the acquisition of 21st Century Fox by Disney and rebranding of Fox Star Studios. The film was also released in North America by 20th Century Studios and worldwide on the same day by Walt Disney Studios Motion Pictures. It was shown in 5000 screens in India and 3000 overseas, for a worldwide total of 8000 screens, the widest for an Indian film.

The film had planned paid previews in the United States on 8 September 2022, a day before its release.

The film was originally planned to release on 23 December 2016 but was delayed by several years owing to production delays and monetary constraints, and later due to the COVID-19 pandemic.

In October 2017, the film was announced for a 15 August 2019 release; Brahmāstra was pushed to Christmas 2019 and then to the summer of 2020 due to pending work on the film's visual effects and music.

In February 2020, its release date was announced as 4 December 2020. However, due to the COVID-19 pandemic in India, the release was delayed indefinitely.

In December 2021, a final release date of 9 September 2022 was announced.

On 2 September 2022, the Delhi High Court, under an interim order, restrained eighteen piracy websites from illegally streaming the film on the Internet, following a lawsuit filed by Star India.

=== Controversy ===
Before its release, there were calls for boycotting the film by right-wing Hindu nationalists who were opposed to all films from Bollywood, alleging that anti-Hindu sentiments were prevalent in the industry. An old interview of Kapoor where he had mentioned that he likes eating beef regained traction on social media platforms; cows are venerated in Hinduism. Consequently, Kapoor and Bhatt were stopped from entering the Mahakaleshwar Jyotirlinga in Ujjain by members of the Bajrang Dal, a Hindu nationalist organisation.

=== Home media ===
On 17 September 2022, Rebecca Campbell, Chairman of International Content and Operations for Disney, confirmed while speaking with The Economic Times about the success of Disney+ Hotstar that the film will be streaming on Hulu in the US and Japan, Star+ in Latin America and Disney+ internationally.

The film digitally premiered on Hulu in the US and Disney+ Hotstar in India and overall Asia on 4 November 2022. An English dub of the film was also released on the former the same day. The film, alongside its English dub, was released on Disney+ on 7 December 2022. In the English dubbed version, actress Samridhii Shukla lent her voice to Alia Bhatt's character.

== Reception ==
=== Box office ===
Brahmāstra: Part One – Shiva has grossed ₹320 crore (US$34 million) in India and ₹111 crore (US$12 million) overseas, for a worldwide gross of est.₹431 crore (US$46 million). In the United States and Canada, the film made US$4.5 million from 810 theatres in its opening weekend. With earnings of ₹189 crore in Hindi and ₹213 crore overall worldwide in its first weekend, the film emerged as the highest-grossing Hindi film overseas since the COVID-19 pandemic. It also had the highest domestic weekend for an original Hindi film, and the second-highest for a film with screenings in Hindi after K.G.F: Chapter 2. Box Office India in their year-end report gave Brahmāstra: Part One – Shiva a ‘‘hit’’ verdict.

=== Critical response ===
Brahmāstra: Part One – Shiva received mixed reviews from critics with praise for the VFX, direction, performances of the starcast (particularly Ranbir Kapoor, Alia Bhatt, Amitabh Bachchan, Mouni Roy and Nagarjuna), music, scale, ambition, action sequences and Shah Rukh Khan's special appearance while the storyline, characterization, screenplay and dialogues received criticism. On the review aggregator website Rotten Tomatoes, 49% of 35 critics' reviews are positive, with an average rating of 5.7/10. The website's consensus reads: "Ambitious yet uneven, Brahmastra Part One: Shiva offers definite pleasures for Bollywood fans, although the incessant spectacle may ultimately overwhelm many viewers." Metacritic, which uses a weighted average, assigned the film a score of 57 out of 100, based on 6 critics, indicating "mixed or average" reviews.

==== India ====
Avinash Lohana of Pinkvilla rated the film 4 out of 5 stars and wrote "Brahmāstra: Part One – Shiva is a classic example of ambition meeting vision and an immersive experience that promises entertainment". Amandeep Narang of ABP News rated the film 4 out of 5 stars and wrote "Brahmāstra deserves its due respect and place in Indian cinematic history". Rachana Dubey of The Times of India rated the film 3.5 out of 5 stars and wrote "Brahmāstra borrows from Indian mythology and folk tales, which is fantastic. The effort and passion invested in creating the universe in this film, replete with minute detailing, are worthy of appreciation". Tushar Joshi of India Today rated the film 3.5 out of 5 stars and called the film "a solid effort as the first chapter in this trilogy", remarking that the Astraverse "can take on the MCU". Sonil Dedhia of News 18 rated the film 3.5 out of 5 stars, calling it "a solid and satisfying watch, a well-crafted film", and appreciated Mukerji's vision, saying that it "needs to applauded". Fengyen Chiu of Mashable India rated the film 3.5 out of 5 stars and wrote "Brahmāstra is a complete visual feast rooted deep with Indian mythology. Ayan Mukerji has created a landmark moment in Indian cinema with the state-of-the art VFX". Sonal Verma of Zee News rated the film 3.5 out of 5 stars and wrote "The screenplay is filled with love, light, magic, ancient mysticism and mythology. The film has many surprises that will definitely make you go wow". Devesh Sharma of Filmfare rated the film 3.5 out of 5 stars and encouraged readers to watch Brahmāstra for "its visual appeal" and for "the burning chemistry" between Bhatt and Kapoor.

Saibal Chatterjee of NDTV rated the film 3 out of 5 stars and called it "ambitious and entertaining", further stating it "has the makings of a blockbuster of the sort that Bollywood has been desperately seeking for a while". Sukanya Verma of Rediff rated the film 3 out of 5 stars and stated it as "a work of star-struck ambition and high-octane energy whose razzle-dazzle hits many happy notes". Nandini Ramnath of Scroll.in rated the film 3 out of 5 stars and wrote, "Brahmāstra: Part One – Shiva gets the pyrotechnics right but fumbles in creating an emotionally involving alternate reality". Sowmya Rajendran of The News Minute rated the film 3 out of 5 stars and wrote "Brahmāstra constantly tries to make your jaw drop to the floor with the visual effects, but since we never empathize with the characters on screen, it remains a distant spectacle". Rohit Vats of DNA India rated the film 3 out of 5 stars, stating that "Brahmāstra tries hard to present itself as the revelation of deeper truths of humankind but doesn't exactly get there where it wanted to be", and said the film is "grand and has all the tropes of mega Bollywood projects, and is enthralling". Stutee Ghosh of The Quint rated the film 3 out of 5 stars and wrote "Brahmāstra grabs us in parts. If the unnecessary parts about love and lovers could have been avoided the impact would have been stronger. For now, the sound and light show should suffice". Monika Rawal Kukreja of Hindustan Times stated, "Ranbir Kapoor and Alia Bhatt are electric in this Ayan Mukerji spectacle. The film is a treat for long-waiting fans of Hindi cinema." Anuj Kumar of The Hindu stated "Despite the presence of Ranbir Kapoor, Alia Bhatt and Amitabh Bachchan, the film's writing turns out to be its biggest drawback with all the hype over Indian mythology just being a cosmetic cover".

Reputed film critic Taran Adarsh rated the film 2 out of 5 stars and wrote "Brahmāstra is a king-sized disappointment High on VFX, low on content [second half nosedives]. Brahmāstra could've been a game changer, but, alas, it is a missed opportunity. All gloss, no soul." Rohit Bhatnagar of The Free Press Journal rated the film 2.5 out of 5 stars and stated "a so-called critique-proof film Brahmāstra: Part One – Shiva might have a larger-than-life scale, grandeur, and visual spectacle but nothing more to this run-of-the-mill good v/s evil story." Writing for Deccan Herald, Vivek M. V. gave a rating of 2.5 out of 5 and wrote that the film has "tame and silly dialogues. This further dents the weakly-written love story, which is the film's biggest problem". Anna M. M. Vetticad of Firstpost rated the film 2 out of 5 stars, finding its story "weak" and the romance between the leads "unconvincing". Rayan Sayyed of IGN India also criticised the romance between the film's leads and wrote that "the mythology and its computer-generated portrayals are the only reasons to watch this film." Shubhra Gupta of The Indian Express rated the film 1.5 out of 5 stars, panning it: "Despite all those non-stop computer graphics, the opulence of the sets, the starry array, the film's commitment to its subject, we never really buy into it completely". Ishita Bhargav of Financial Express found the film to be cliché and criticised the dialogue, stating that the "grand vision ends up becoming a film for kids." Pooja Biraia Jaiswal of The Week rated the film 1 out of 5 stars and said Mukerji "has wasted the skills and popularity of Shah Rukh Khan, Nagarjuna, and of course, Amitabh Bachchan". A critic of The Wire panned the film by stating "the story lacks vitality, momentum, and intrigue. The film is devoid of genuine joy. Characters and settings come at you all the time, as if you've entered a lunch buffet on a full stomach."

==== International ====
American audiences polled by PostTrak gave the film a 70% overall positive score, with 60% saying they would definitely recommend it.

Simon Abrams of the TheWrap commented that the film plays out as exceedingly familiar superhero fantasy but somehow hasn't nailed the genre. Courtney Howard of Variety called the film "a wildly entertaining jump start to a planned trilogy" and was appreciative of Mukerji's direction: "He smashes up genre conventions as Western cinematic influences readily co-mingle with pure Bollywood razzle-dazzle." Conversely, Scott Mendelson from Forbes rated the film 4 out of 10 and commented that "despite strong production values and the expected larger-than-life razzle-dazzle, this first entry in India's first original cinematic universe repeats the same mistake that doomed Universal's Dark Universe and most other post-Avengers attempts at a cinematic universe." Mike McCahill of The Guardian rated the film 3 out of 5 stars and wrote "Mukerji brings a peppy, wide-eyed spirit to the superhero-movie model, adorning tried-and-tested arcs and beats with workable Pritam songs, ravishing colours and gorgeous people". IndieWire rated the film C+ in a mixed review criticising the cast and performances, calling them "bloated" and concluded by stating it as an admirable attempt and unmissable theatrical experience for any Bollywood fan.

== Accolades ==
Award	Date of ceremony	Category	Recipient(s) and nominee(s)	Result	Ref(s)
Zee Cine Awards	26 February 2023	Best Film	Brahmāstra: Part One – Shiva	Nominated	
Zee Cine Awards	26 February 2023	Best Director	Ayan Mukerji	Won	
Zee Cine Awards	26 February 2023	Best Story	Ayan Mukerji	Nominated	
Zee Cine Awards	26 February 2023	Best Actor	Ranbir Kapoor	Nominated	
Zee Cine Awards	26 February 2023	Best Music Director	Pritam	Won	
Zee Cine Awards	26 February 2023	Song of the Year	"Kesariya"	Won	
Filmfare Awards	27 April 2023	Best Film	Brahmāstra: Part One – Shiva	Nominated	
Filmfare Awards	27 April 2023	Best Director	Ayan Mukerji	Nominated	
Filmfare Awards	27 April 2023	Best Supporting Actress	Mouni Roy	Nominated	
Filmfare Awards	27 April 2023	Best Music Director	Pritam	Won	
Filmfare Awards	27 April 2023	Best Lyricist	Amitabh Bhattacharya for "Kesariya"	Won	
Filmfare Awards	27 April 2023	Best Male Playback Singer	Arijit Singh for "Deva Deva"	Nominated	
Filmfare Awards	27 April 2023	Best Male Playback Singer	Arijit Singh for "Kesariya"	Won	
Filmfare Awards	27 April 2023	Best Female Playback Singer	Jonita Gandhi for "Deva Deva"	Nominated	
Filmfare Awards	27 April 2023	Best Art Direction	Amrita Mahal Nakai	Nominated	
Filmfare Awards	27 April 2023	Best Choreography	Ganesh Acharya for "Dance Ka Bhoot"	Nominated	
Filmfare Awards	27 April 2023	Best Cinematographer	Sudeep Chatterjee	Nominated	
Filmfare Awards	27 April 2023	Best Sound Design	Bishwadeep Dipak Chatterjee	Won	
Filmfare Awards	27 April 2023	Best Background Score	Pritam, Jim Satya, Prasad S, Meghdeep Bose, Tanuj Tiku, Ketan Sodha, Sunny M.R.	Nominated	
Filmfare Awards	27 April 2023	Best Action	Dan Bradley, Diyan Hristov and Parvez Shaikh	Nominated	
Filmfare Awards	27 April 2023	Best Special Effects	Dneg, ReDefine	Won	
IIFA Awards	26-27 May 2023	Best Director	Ayan Mukerji	Nominated	
IIFA Awards	26-27 May 2023	Best Story	Ayan Mukerji	Nominated	
IIFA Awards	26-27 May 2023	Best Supporting Actor	Shah Rukh Khan	Nominated	
IIFA Awards	26-27 May 2023	Best Supporting Actress	Mouni Roy	Won	
IIFA Awards	26-27 May 2023	Best Music Director	Pritam	Won	
IIFA Awards	26-27 May 2023	Best Lyricist	Amitabh Bhattacharya for "Kesariya"	Won	
IIFA Awards	26-27 May 2023	Best Male Playback Singer	Arijit Singh for "Deva Deva"	Nominated	
IIFA Awards	26-27 May 2023	Best Male Playback Singer	Arijit Singh for "Kesariya"	Won	
IIFA Awards	26-27 May 2023	Best Female Playback Singer	Jonita Gandhi for "Deva Deva"	Nominated	
IIFA Awards	26-27 May 2023	Best Female Playback Singer	Shreya Ghoshal for "Rasiya"	Won	
IIFA Awards	26-27 May 2023	Best Special Effects	DNEG & Redefine	Won	
National Film Awards	16 August 2024	Best Film in AVGC	Ayan Mukerji	Won	
National Film Awards	16 August 2024	Best VFX Supervisor	Jaykar Arudra; Viral Thakkar	Won	
National Film Awards	16 August 2024	Best MusicDirection	Pritam	Won	
National Film Awards	16 August 2024	Best Male Playback Singer	Arijit Singh for "Kesariya"	Won	

== Future ==
=== Circumquel, sequel and prequel ===
At the time of release of the original movie, two parts were reported to be set to release in 2024 and 2026 due to numerous delays. Brahmāstra: Part Two – Dev will be a circumquel to Brahmāstra: Part One – Shiva and Brahmāstra: Part Three – Shiva vs Dev will be a sequel to Brahmāstra: Part Two – Dev respectively. A circumquel will commence from April 2027 and a sequel will also commence from later 2027. Both parts will be shot simultaneously.

=== Streaming television series ===
Mukerji revealed Disney had sent him to Los Angeles as an attendee for an international studio summit in May 2022, where he presented Brahmāstra, and met American producer Kevin Feige. Mukerji further revealed his vision to develop a streaming television series in the Astraverse, as well as theatrical projects, in a similar vein to the Marvel Cinematic Universe. He also called the Astraverse a "large-scale mainstream experiment", saying that he wishes to expand it to gaming, merchandise, virtual reality, and the Metaverse, in the future.

=== Spin-off ===
Mukerji revealed a spin-off film based around Shah Rukh Khan's character Mohan Bhargav was in consideration, which would serve as an origin story about how he wielded Vanarastra.
