= Kerala Film Critics Association Awards 2015 =

Annual Malayalam film awards ceremony in India

The 39th Kerala Film Critics Association Awards, recognising excellence in Malayalam films released in 2015, were announced in May 2016.

== Winners ==
=== Main Awards ===
- Best Film: Ennu Ninte Moideen
- Best Actor: Prithviraj (Ennu Ninte Moideen)
- Best Actress: Parvathy (Ennu Ninte Moideen, Charlie)
- Best Director: R. S. Vimal (Ennu Ninte Moideen)
- Second Best Film: Kaattum Mazhayum
- Best Popular Film: Charlie and Oru Vadakkan Selfie
- Best Children's Film: Akashangalkappuram, Vikalpam
- Best Child Artists: Vishal Krishna and Janaki Menon (Maalgudi Days)
- Second Best Actor: Prem Prakash (Nirnayakam)
- Second Best Actress: Lena (Ennu Ninte Moideen)
- Best Screenplay: Lenin Rajendran (Edavappathy)
- Best Lyricist: Antony Abraham (Ormakalil Oru Manjukaalam)
- Best Music Director: M. Jayachandran (Nirnayakam, Ennu Ninte Moideen)
- Best Male Playback Singer: P. Jayachandran (Ennu Ninte Moideen)
- Best Female Playback Singer: K. S. Chithra (Ormakalil Oru Manjukaalam)
- Best Cinematographer: Jomon T. John (Neena, Ennu Ninte Moideen)
- Best Editor: Mahesh Narayanan (Nirnayakam)
- Best Art Director: Jayasree Lakshmi Narayanan (Charlie)
- Best Make-up: Jayachandran (Edavappathy)
- Best Costume Designer: Sameera Saneesh (Edavappathy)
- Best Debut Actor: Utthara Unni (Edavappathy)
- Best Debut Directors: Sateesh Babu Senen and Santhosh Babu Senen (Chayam Poosiya Veedu)
- Best Costume Design: Sameera Saneesh (Edavappathy)

=== Special awards ===
- Socially Relevant Film: Ramprasad (Arani)
- Sanskrit Film: Vinod Mankara (Priyamanasam)

=== Special Jury Awards ===
- Special Jury Award – Direction: Jayaram Kailas (Akkaldhamayile Pennu)
- Special Jury Award – Acting: Asif Ali(Nirnayakam)
- Special Jury Award – Acting: Sudheer Karamana (Nirnayakam, Ennu Ninte Moideen, Akkaldhamayile Pennu)
- Special Jury Award – Cinematography: Ayyappan N. (Mallanum Mathevanum)
- Special Jury Award – Playback Singer: Shilpa Raju

=== Honorary Awards ===
- Chalachitra Ratnam Award: Innocent
- Chalachitra Prathibha Award: Kaviyoor Sivaprasad, Bichu Thirumala, Mallika Sukumaran
