= Kerala Film Critics Association Awards 2002 =

Annual Indian film awards ceremony

The 26th Kerala Film Critics Association Awards, recognising excellence in the Malayalam films released in 2002, were announced in January 2003.

== Winners ==
=== Main awards ===
- Best Film: Nandanam
- Best Director: Ranjith (Nandanam)
- Best Male Debut : Jishnu Raghavan (Nammal) and Sidharth Bharathan (Nammal)
- Best Actor: Dileep (Kunjikoonan)
- Best Actress: Navya Nair (Nandanam, Kunjikoonan)
- Second Best Film: Nammal, Yathrakarude Sradhakku)
- Second Best Actor : Prithviraj Sukumaran (Nandanam)
- Second Best Actress : Jyothirmayi (Bhavam)
- Best Popular Film : Meesha Madhavan
- Best Debut Director : Sathish Menon (Bhavam)
- Best Child Actor :Master Ashwin Thampy (Kakke Kakke Koodevide?), Master Amal Mohan (Krishnapakshakilikal)
- Best Story: Mani Shornur
- Best Screenplay: Sreenivasan (Yathrakarude Sradhakku)
- Best Lyricist: Kaithapram Damodaran Namboothiri (Yathrakarude Sradhakku)
- Best Music Director: Vidyasagar (Meesha Madhavan)
- Best Male Playback Singer: M. G. Sreekumar (Film(s): Nandanam, Aabharanacharth) (Song(s): "Manassil", "Nadavinodini")
- Best Female Playback Singer: Radhika Thilak (Film : Kunjikoonan, Song: "Omanamalare Ninmaran")

=== Special awards ===
- Best Children's Film: Krishna Pakshakkilikkal
- Best Short Film: The Journey of Naked God (Dir: Sasikumar)
- Best Documentary: Jeevanakalayude Pulluvageetham (Dir: Venukumar)

=== Special Jury Awards ===
- Special Jury Award – Direction: Sivaprasad
- Special Jury Award – Acting: Sai Kumar

=== Honorary Awards ===
- Chalachitra Ratnam Award: Bharat Gopy
- Chalachitra Prathibha Award: John Sankaramangalam, Kuttyedathi Vilasini, Bharanikkavu Sivakumar, Pappukutty Bhagavathar
