= Kerala Film Critics Association Awards 2010 =

Awards given to Malayalam films in 2010

The 34th Kerala Film Critics Association Awards, recognising excellence in the Malayalam films released in 2010, were announced in February 2011.

== Winners ==
=== Main awards ===
- Best Film: Khaddama
- Best Director: Kamal (Khaddama)
- Best Actor: Mammootty (Pranchiyettan and the Saint)
- Best Actress: Kavya Madhavan (Khaddama)
- Second Best Film: Makaramanju
- Second Best Actor – Male: Biju Menon (Various films)
- Best Supporting Actor – Female: Samvrutha Sunil (Various films)
- Best Debut Director: Vinod Mankara (Karayilekku Oru Kadal Dooram), Martin Prakkat (Best Actor)
- Best Story: Mohan Raghavan (T. D. Dasan Std. VI B)
- Best Screenplay: Ranjith (Pranchiyettan and the Saint)
- Best Music Director: M. Jayachandran (Karayilekku Oru Kadal Dooram)
- Best Lyricist: Kaithapram Damodaran Namboothiri (Holidays, Neelambari)
- Best Male Playback Singer: Shankar Mahadevan (Holidays)
- Best Female Playback Singer: Shreya Ghoshal (Aagathan)
- Most Popular Film: Janakan, Shikkar
- Best Cinematographer: Madhu Ambat (Adaminte Makan Abu, Gramam)
- Best Debutant Artist – Female: Karthika (Makaramanju), Ann Augustine (Elsamma Enna Aankutty)
- Best Debutant Artist – Male: Vijay Yesudas (Avan)
- Best Editing: Ranjan Abraham (Elsamma Enna Aankutty)

=== Special Jury Awards ===
- Special Jury Award – Direction: R. Sukumaran (Yugapurushan)
- Special Jury Award – Direction: G. Ajayan (Bodhi)
- Special Jury Award – Acting: Salim Kumar (Adaminte Makan Abu)

=== Honorary Awards ===
- Chalachitra Ratnam Award: K. S. Sethumadhavan
- Chalachitra Prathibha Award: Jagannatha Varma, Bichu Thirumala, Santhakumari
