= Kerala Film Critics Association Awards 2019 =

Annual Indian film awards ceremony

The 43rd Kerala Film Critics Association Awards, recognising excellence in the Malayalam-language films released in 2019, were announced in October 2020.

== Winners ==
=== Main awards ===
- Best Film: Jallikattu
- Best Actor: Nivin Pauly - Moothon
- Best Actress: Manju Warrier - Prathi Poovankozhi
- Best Director: Geetu Mohandas - Moothon
- Second Best Film: Vasanthi
- Second Best Director: Rahman brothers - Vasanthi
- Best Child Artist Female : Anamiya (Aami) [film- samyayathra]
- Best Supporting Actor (Male): Vineeth Sreenivasan - Thanneer Mathan Dinangal & Chemban Vinod Jose - Jallikattu, Porinju Mariam Jose
- Best Supporting Actor (Female): Swasika - Vasanthi
- Best Screenplay: Sajin Baabu - Biriyaani
- Best Lyricist: Rafeeq Ahamed - Shyamaragam
- Best Music Director: Ouseppachan - Evidey
- Best Male Playback Singer: Vijay Yesudas - Pathinettam Padi, Shyamaragam
- Best Female Playback Singer: Manjari - March Randam Vyazham
- Best Cinematographer: Gireesh Gangadharan - Jallikattu
- Best Art director: Dileep Nath - Uyare
- Best Editor: Samjith Muhammad - Lucifer
- Best Sound Design: Anand Babu - Thureeyam, Humania
- Best Makeup Artist: Subi Johal & Rajiv Subba - Uyare
- Best Costume Design: Midhun Murali - Humania
- Best Popular Movie: Thanneer Mathan Dinangal

=== Honorary Awards ===
- Chalachitra Ratnam Award: Hariharan
- Ruby Jubilee Award: Mammootty
- Chalachitra Prathibha Award: S. Kumar, Nemam Pushparaj, Sethulakshmi, Kollam Mohan
