= Kerala Film Critics Association Awards 2011 =

Indian film award ceremony

The 35th Kerala Film Critics Association Awards, honouring excellence in various categories in the Malayalam-language films released in 2011, were announced in May 2012.

== Winners ==
=== Main awards ===
- Best Film: Pranayam
- Best Director: Blessy (Pranayam)
- Best Actor: Mohanlal (Pranayam)
- Best Actress: Rima Kallingal (Indian Rupee)
- Second Best Film: Urumi
- Second Best Actor – Male: Anoop Menon (Traffic, Pranayam)
- Second Best Actor – Female: Lena (Traffic, Athe Mazha Athe Veyil)
- Best Screenplay: Bobby–Sanjay (Traffic)
- Best Music Director: M. G. Sreekumar - (Arabeem Ottakom P. Madhavan Nayarum in Oru Marubhoomikkadha)
- Best Lyricist: Rajeev Alunkal
- Best Male Playback Singer: Vidhu Prathap (Oomakkuyil Padumbol)
- Best Female Playback Singer: Manjari (Urumi)
- Most Popular film: Indian Rupee
- Best Cinematographer: Santhosh Sivan (Urumi)
- Best child artist – Female: Malavika (Oomakkuyil Padumbol)
- Best child artist – Male: Ashwin (Athe Mazha Athe Veyil)
- Best Editing: DONMAX (Chaappa Kurishu)
- Best recording: Ananda Babu (Urumi)
- Best Debutant Director: Siddique Chendamangalloor (Oomakkuyil Padumbol)
- Best Debutant Artist: Shaji Idappal (Athe Mazha Athe Veyil)

=== Special Jury Awards ===
- Special Jury Award – Film: Oomakkuyil Padumbol
- Special Jury Award – Acting: Prithviraj (Indian Rupee, Urumi)

=== Honorary Awards ===
- Chalachitra Ratnam Award: O. N. V. Kurup
- Chalachitra Prathibha Award: Janardhanan, N. L. Balakrishnan, Thodupuzha Vasanthi
