= Kerala Film Critics Association Awards 2017 =

Annual Indian film awards ceremony

The 41st Kerala Film Critics Association Awards, honouring the best Malayalam films released in 2017, were announced in April 2018. The awards ceremony was held in Kayamkulam on 15 October 2019.

== Winners ==
=== Main awards ===
- Best Film: Thondimuthalum Driksakshiyum
- Best Director: Jayaraj (Bhayanakam)
- Best Actor: Fahadh Faasil (Thondimuthalum Driksakshiyum)
- Best Actress: Manju Warrier (Udaharanam Sujatha)
- Second Best Film: Aalorukkam
- Second Best Actor: Tovino Thomas (Mayaanadhi)
- Second Best Actress: Aishwarya Lekshmi (Mayaanadhi)
- Best Screenplay: Sajeev Pazhoor
- Best Art Director: Maya Siva (Dhan)
- Best Cinematographer: Nikhil. S Praveen (Bhayanakam)
- Best Music Director: 4 Musics
- Best Children's Film: Ilakal Pacha Pookkal Manja
- Best Lyricist: M. G. Sadasivan
- Best Male Playback Singer: Kallara Gopan
- Best Female Playback Singer: Jyotsna
- Best Popular Film: Ramaleela
- Best Child Artist: Master Alok, Baby Meenakshi
- Best Editing: Ayoob Khan
- Best Sound Design: Renganaath Ravee
- Best Makeup Artist: N. G. Roshan
- Best Costumes: S. B. Satheesh

=== Special Jury Awards ===
- Direction: Harikumar (Clint)
- Direction: Unni Pranavam (Hadiya)
- Acting: Sheelu Abraham (Sadrishavakyam 24:29)
- Lyrics: Dr. Venugopal (Eliyammachiyude Adhyathe Christmas)
- Socially Relevant Film: M. A. Nishad (Kinar)

=== Honorary Awards ===
- Chalachitra Ratnam Award: M. K. Arjunan
- Ruby Jubilee Award: Indrans
- Chalachitra Prathibha Award: Balu Kiriyath, Devan, Jalaja
