= Kerala Film Critics Association Awards 2013 =

Annual Indian film awards ceremony

The 37th Kerala Film Critics Association Awards, honouring excellence in various categories in the Malayalam films released in 2013, were announced in January 2014.

== Winners ==
=== Main awards ===
- Best Film: Drishyam
- Best Director: Jeethu Joseph (Drishyam)
- Best Actor: Mohanlal (Drishyam)
- Best Actress: Remya Nambeesan (English: An Autumn in London, Nadan)
- Second Best Film: Ayaal
- Second Best Actor: Mukesh (English: An Autumn in London, Vasanthathinte Kanalvazhikal)
- Second Best Actress: Mallika (Kadhaveedu)
- Best Screenplay: P. Ananthapadmanabhan (August Club)
- Best Music Director: Ratheesh Vega (Orissa)
- Best Lyricist: Prabha Varma and Madhu Vasudevan (Nadan)
- Best Male Playback Singer: Najim Arshad (Drishyam, Immanuel)
- Best Female Playback Singer: Jyotsna (Zachariyayude Garbhinikal)
- Best Cinematographer: Udayan Ambadi (English)
- Best Child Artist: Sanoop Santhosh (Philips and the Monkey Pen)
- Best Editing: Sobin K Soman (Ayal)
- Best Recording: Tapas Nayik (Nadan)
- Upcoming Actor: Niranjay (Black Butterfly)
- Upcoming Director: Sajin Babu (Astamayam Vare), Abin Jacob (Thompson Villa), Krishnajith S Vijayan (Flat No 4B) and Vinod Kumar (Test Paper)
- Best Popular Film: Amen

=== Special Jury Awards ===
- Special Jury Award – Film: Orissa, Kunthapura, Vasanthathinte Kanalvazhikal and Pakaram

=== Honorary Awards ===
- Chalachitra Ratnam Award: K. R. Vijaya
- Chalachitra Prathibha Award: T. G. Ravi, Mala Aravindan, A. J. Joseph
