= Kerala Film Critics Association Awards 2014 =

Annual Indian film awards ceremony

The 38th Kerala Film Critics Association Awards, honouring the best Malayalam films released in 2014, were announced in April 2015. The awards were distributed at an event held in Trivandrum on 30 March 2016.

== Winners ==
=== Main awards ===
- Best Film: Ottaal and Iyobinte Pusthakam
- Best Director: Jayaraj (Ottaal) and Amal Neerad (Iyobinte Pusthakam)
- Best Actor: Manoj K. Jayan (Kukkiliyar, Negalukal)
- Best Actress: Asha Sarath (Varsham)
- Second Best Film: Ottamandaram
- Best Popular Film: Vellimoonga
- Second Best Actor – Male: Nandu (Ottamandaram, Kukkiliyar, Alroopangal)
- Best Actor – Female: Bhamaa (Ottamandaram, Nakku Penta Nakku Takka)
- Best Screenplay: Bobby–Sanjay (How Old Are You?)
- Best Music Director: Gopi Sunder (1983, Nakku Penta Nakku Takka)
- Best Lyricist: Hari Narayanan (1983)
- Best Male Playback Singer: Sudeep Kumar (Varsham)
- Best Female Playback Singer: Madhusree Narayanan (Ottamandaram)
- Best Cinematographer: Amal Neerad (Iyobinte Pusthakam)
- Best Child Artist: Ashanth K Shah (Ottaal) and Amritha Anil (How Old Are You?)
- Best Editing – Hariharaputran (Alroopangal)
- Best Sound Recordist: N. Harikumar
- Best Art Director: Boban (Angels)
- Best Make-up: Pattanam Rasheed (Chayilyam, Kukkiliyar)
- Best Costume Designer: Sameera Saneesh (Iyobinte Pusthakam)
- Best Environmental Film: Thamara – (Producer-Vijeesh Mani)
- Upcoming Actors: Nikki Galrani (1983) and Sachin Anand (Nakshathrangal)
- Upcoming Directors: Abrid Shine (1983), N. K. Muhammed Koya (Alif) and Jude Anthany Joseph (Om Shanti Oshana)

=== Special Jury Awards ===
- Special Jury Award – Adaptation: Santhosh Souparnika (Mizhi Thurakku)
- Special Jury Award – Adaptation: Suneesh Neendoor (Krishna Yaksha)
- Special Jury Award – Film: Chandrahasan (John Paul Vaathil Thurakkunnu)
- Special Jury Award – Acting: Kumarakom Vasavan (Ottaal)
- Special Jury Award – Lyrics: Kariavattom Sreekantan Nair

=== Honorary Awards ===
- Chalachitra Ratnam Award: K. G. George
- Chalachitra Prathibha Award: Perumbavoor G. Raveendranath, Bhagyalakshmi, Nilambur Ayisha
