= Kerala Film Critics Association Awards 2018 =

Annual Indian film awards ceremony

The 42nd Kerala Film Critics Association Awards, recognising excellence in the Malayalam films released in 2018, were announced in April 2019.

== Winners ==
=== Main awards ===
- Best Film: Oru Kuprasidha Payyan
- Best Director: Shaji N. Karun (Oolu)
- Best Actor: Mohanlal (Odiyan)
- Best Actress: Nimisha Sajayan (Oru Kuprasidha Payyan) and Anusree (Aanakkallan, Aadhi)
- Second Best Film: Joseph
- Second Best Actor: Joju George (Joseph)
- Second Best Actress: Iniya (Parole), (Pengalila)
- Best Screenplay: Mubi Huque (Khaleefa)
- Best Music Director: Kailas Menon (Theevandi)
- Best Lyricist: Rajeev Alunkal
- Best Male Playback Singer: Rakesh Brahmanandan (Pen Masala)
- Best Female Playback Singer: Resmi Sateesh (Ee Mazhanilavil)
- Best Debutant – Male: Pranav Mohanlal (Aadhi)
- Best Debutant – Female: Audrey Miriam Henest (Ormma)
- Best Child Artist: Master Rithun, Baby Akshara Kishore
- Best Environmental Film: Samaksham (Director: Aju K.Narayanan)

=== Special Jury Awards ===
- Special Jury Award for Acting: M.A. Nishad: Vaaku

=== Honorary Awards ===
- Chalachitra Ratnam Award: Sheela
- Chalachitra Prathibha Award: Kaithapram Damodaran, P. Sreekumar, Lalu Alex, Menaka, Bhagyalakshmi
