= Kerala Film Critics Association Awards 2023 =

Annual Indian film awards ceremony

47th Kerala Film Critics Association Awards
- Organized by: Kerala Film Critics Association

Highlights
- Best Film: Aattam
- Most awards: Aattam

The 47th Kerala Film Critics Association Awards, recognising excellence in the Malayalam films released in 2023, were announced in May 2024.

== Winners ==
- Best Film: Aattam
- Best Actor: Biju Menon - Garudan (2023 film) & Vijayaraghavan - Pookkaalam
- Best Actress: Zarin Shihab - Aattam & Sshivada - Jawanum Mullappoovum
- Best Director: Anand Ekarshi - Aattam
- Second Best Film: Thadavu
- Best Child Artist: Naseef Othayi (Chaama)
