= Namukku Parkkan Munthirithoppukal =

- Theatrical release poster
- Directed by: P. Padmarajan
- Screenplay by: P. Padmarajan
- Based on: Nammukku Gramangalil Chennu Rapparkkam by K. K. Sudhakaran
- Produced by: Mani Malliath
- Starring: Mohanlal; Shari; Thilakan; Vineeth; Kaviyoor Ponnamma
- Cinematography: Venu
- Edited by: B. Lenin
- Music by: Johnson
- Production company: Ragam Movies
- Distributed by: Century Release
- Release date: 12 September 1986
- Running time: 140 minutes
- Country: India
- Language: Malayalam

Namukku Parkkan Munthirithoppukal (transl. Vineyards for us to dwell in) is a 1986 Indian Malayalam-language romance drama film written and directed by Padmarajan based on the 1986 novel Nammukku Gramangalil Chennu Rapparkkam by K. K. Sudhakaran. The film stars Mohanlal, Shari, Thilakan, Vineeth, and Kaviyoor Ponnamma. The music was composed by Johnson. The plot is centered around a Malayali Syrian Christian-Nasrani ("Nazarene") family. Throughout the story, there are references to the Biblical book Song of Songs where it depicts the romantic dialogue between a young woman and her lover.

For the film, Venu won the National Film Award for Best Cinematography and Shari won the Kerala State Film Award for Best Actress and Filmfare Award for Best Actress in Malayalam. The film is regarded as a cult classic and is considered one of the best romantic Malayalam films ever made.

== Plot ==
Solomon's mother, a college-going cousin, Antony, and a female relative who helps at the house live in Mysore. Paul Pailokkaran, a railway employee, his wife, a nurse, and two young daughters, Sofia and college-going Elizabeth, are the new inhabitants at the neighboring house. Solomon lives on a farm and vineyard he owns on the outskirts of Mysore and comes to visit his mother once in a while. On one such visit, he meets Sofia, and romance blossoms between them. Sofia was born to her mother in her premarital love affair. Her stepfather often shows an intention to molest her. She communicates all this to Solomon and their bond strengthens. They dream of a life together in his vineyard, laughing, smiling, loving, waking up to the chirping of birds, and going around in his tanker lorry.

But when Solomon informs his mother of his love, she first disagrees with the marriage as Paul Pailokkaran is an uncouth person, and he further reveals Sofia's birth secret to Solomon's mother in an attempt to prevent her marriage with Solomon. Solomon finally manages to convince his mother and the wedding plans are set in motion. An irked Paul Pailokkaran, on a day when Sofia is alone at home for some time, attacks her, renders her unconscious, and rapes her. Solomon, his mother, and Sofia's mother come home to discover a distraught Sofia and learn of the rape. Solomon's mother decides once and for all that her son should not enter into an alliance with such a family or a girl. Fighting with his mother, Solomon leaves on his bike. Sofia is consoled by her mother that nothing has happened, and she accepts it tearfully but expresses her pain that a person who ought to be in her father's position did this to her. Paul Pailokkaran returns home and is not remorseful. He taunts Sofia and her mother that now no one will come to marry her.

In the wee hours of the next morning, everyone is awakened by the resounding horn of a tanker lorry. After the second horn, Solomon comes to the door of Sophie's home, calling out for her. Paul Pailokkaran opens the door and slyly smiling, says "Now you can take her". Solomon hits him black and blue, calling out for Sofia again. When she finally comes out, he goes up to her, tells her "Hadn't we agreed if you didn't come out even after the second horn, I'll come pick you up and go?!" and, lifting her onto his shoulders, takes her to their tanker lorry, and, as his mother, cousin, and Sofia's mother and half-sister look on, (implying that his mother has accepted her son's unconditional love now) drives out into the dawn, both of them smiling and hugging each other.

== Cast ==
- Mohanlal as Solomon
- Shari as Sofia
- Thilakan as Paul Pailokkaran, Sofia's step-father
- Vineeth as Antony Joseph, Solomon's cousin
- Kaviyoor Ponnamma as Reetha, Solomon's mother
- Omana as Rosy Pailokkaran, Sofia's mother
- Mini as Elizabeth Paul, Sofia's step-sister
- Vishnu Prakash as Vakkachan
- Poojappura Radhakrishnan as Rajappan Nair
- N L Narayan as Mathachan
- Pallickal P.N.V as Vicar

== Production ==
The title of the film and novel is based upon a passage from the Biblical book of The Song of Solomon or Song of Songs, Chapter 7:12: "Let us get up early to the vineyards." The protagonist quotes this passage at one point during the film. The film is based on the 1986 novel Nammukku Gramangalil Chennu Rapparkkam by K. K. Sudhakaran.

== Soundtrack ==
The film features original songs composed by Johnson with lyrics by O. N. V. Kurup.

All lyrics are written by O. N. V. Kurup; all music is composed by Johnson.

No.	Title	Artist(s)	Length
1.	"Aakaashamaake"	K. J. Yesudas
2.	"Pavizhampol"	K. J. Yesudas

== Accolades ==
Award	Category	Nominee(s)	Result	Ref.
National Film Awards	Best Cinematography	Venu (also for Amma Ariyan)	Won	
Kerala State Film Award	Best Actress	Shari	Won	
Kerala Film Critics Association Awards	Second Best Film		Won	
Kerala Film Critics Association Awards	Best Screenplay	P. Padmarajan	Won	
Kerala Film Critics Association Awards	Best Actor	Thilakan	Won	
Kerala Film Critics Association Awards	Best Supporting Actress	Shari	Won	
Kerala Film Critics Association Awards	Best Male Playback Singer	K. J. Yesudas	Won	
Filmfare Awards South	Best Actress in Malayalam	Shari	Won	
