= Edavazhiyile Poocha Minda Poocha =

- Directed by: Hariharan
- Written by: M. T. Vasudevan Nair
- Produced by: K. C. Joy
- Starring: Srividya; Madhu; Soman; Ambika
- Cinematography: Melli Irani
- Edited by: G. Venkittaraman
- Music by: M. B. Sreenivasan
- Production company: Priyadarsini Movies
- Distributed by: Thirumeni Pictures
- Release date: 3 August 1979
- Country: India
- Language: Malayalam

Edavazhiyile Poocha Minda Poocha (English: Alley Cat - Silent Cat) is a 1979 Indian Malayalam-language drama film directed by Hariharan, written by M. T. Vasudevan Nair and produced by K. C. Joy. The film stars Srividya, Madhu, Soman, and Ambika. The film has musical score by M. B. Sreenivasan.

== Plot ==
The marriage ceremony of Raja's daughter is approaching and preparations are underway at home. One day, Raja receives a call from his wife Rohini, who is the mother of the girl. Rohini and Raja have been separated for years and Rohini expresses her desire to attend their daughter's wedding. Raja is disturbed by the idea of Rohini's visit and tries to dissuade her. However, Rohini is determined to come and starts her train journey.

As she travels, Rohini thinks about her past - her college days when she was more interested in studies, poetry, and books than in secret romances and flirting like her friends. After finishing her studies, she returns home and her parents arrange her marriage with Raja, a British-educated young upper-class Hindu man who is a top civil servant. The marriage takes place and Rohini is happy at first. However, her happiness does not last long as Raja's busy schedule keeps him away from her often and he even denies her advances for sex. Eventually, a child is born. After the birth of their child, Rohini adjusts to her new life as a socialite and spends her time balancing work as a college professor and taking care of her daughter.

One day, Raja's friend Bhagyanath comes to town and becomes a regular visitor to Raja's house. Gradually, an extramarital relationship emerges between Rohini and Bhagyanath. Initially, they are able to keep it a secret but soon rumours start to spread. Raja eventually discovers the affair and confronts Rohini. He decides to separate from her and wants them to never cross paths again. He takes custody of their child and enrolls her in a boarding school.

Rohini is shattered and seeks solace with Bhagyanath, but he does not accept her and begins to harass her. She receives no support from society and is even harassed by students at her college.

Returning to the present day, Rohini arrives at a hotel and calls Raja to inform him that she wants to visit their daughter. Raja visits her at the hotel and tells her that he will not allow her to see their daughter, leaving Rohini feeling hopeless and ultimately leading her to commit suicide.

== Cast ==
- Srividya as Rohini
- Madhu as Raja
- Soman as Bhagyanath
- Ambika as Syamala
- William D'Cruz as Rohini's father
- P. K. Venukkuttan Nair as Raja's friend
- Adoor Pankajam as Kunjukuttyamma
- Kottayam Santha as Raja's aunt
- Vanchiyoor Radha as College principal
- Rajamma Hari as Raja's friend
- Kalaranjini as College lecturer
- Sankaradi as Sankaran

== Soundtrack ==
The music was composed by M. B. Sreenivasan and the lyrics were written by Yusufali Kechery.

No.	Song	Singers	Lyrics	Length (m:ss)
1	"Kalyaani Amrithatharangini"	P. Jayachandran	Yusufali Kechery	
2	"Viswa Mahaa Kshethra Sannidhiyil"	S. Janaki	Yusufali Kechery	
3	"Vivaahanaalil"	S. Janaki	Yusufali Kechery	

== Awards ==
Kerala Film Critics Association Awards (1979)

- Kerala Film Critics Association Award for Best Actor – Madhu
- Kerala Film Critics Association Award for Best Actress – Srividya
