= Meghamalhar =

2001 film directed by Kamal

- Poster
- Directed by: Kamal
- Screenplay by: Kamal
- Story by: Iqbal Kuttippuram
- Produced by: M. V. Shreyams Kumar; Asianet
- Starring: Biju Menon; Samyuktha Varma; Poornima Mohan; Siddique; Sreenath; Raghavan
- Cinematography: Venugopal
- Edited by: Beena Paul
- Music by: Ramesh Narayan
- Production companies: Mathrubhumi; Asianet
- Distributed by: Sargam Speed Release
- Release date: 25 December 2001
- Country: India
- Language: Malayalam
- Box office: est. 1.5 crore

Meghamalhar is a 2001 Indian Malayalam-language romance film written and directed by Kamal from a story by Iqbal Kuttippuram. It stars Samyuktha Varma and Biju Menon in the lead roles while Sreenath, Siddique, Poornima Mohan, Shivaji and Raghavan play supporting roles. The film was jointly produced by M. V. Shreyams Kumar for Mathrubhumi and Asianet. It won two Kerala State Film Awards and two Filmfare Awards South. The movie was reported to be inspired by the 1945 British movie Brief Encounter.

== Plot ==
The film is the story of Rajeevan, an advocate, and Nandita Menon, a writer. Rajeevan is married to Rekha, a bank employee, and has two kids. Nandita is married to Mukundan, a businessman in the Persian Gulf, and has a daughter. Both lead their respective family lives happily. A mix-up in the cakes they ordered for their respective kids introduces the protagonists and their backgrounds. Both meet each other accidentally, and in due course, their relationship becomes intimate (mentally). Their tastes and thinking are almost alike.

When Rajeev narrates an incident in his childhood bearing uncanny resemblance to Nandita's short story, she realizes he is her childhood friend on whose shoulders she leaned in times of distress. A chemistry develops between them, which Rajeev mistakes for love, and he expresses his feelings to her. She responds predictably and tries to alienate him, ignoring him. Later, she gifts her book, "Megha Malhar", to him, revealing that she is his childhood friend.

Rajeev agrees never to meet her again and meets her for the last time. They travel together to Kanyakumari, where they spent their childhood together. They decide to part ways and live as strangers.

== Cast ==
- Biju Menon as Adv.Rajeev
- Samyuktha Varma as Nandita Menon (voice dubbed by Bhagyalekshmi)
- Poornima Mohan as Rekha Rajeev
- Siddique as Mukundan(Nandita’s husband)
- Sreenath as Advocate Bhoominathan, Rajeevan's senior and friend
- Raghavan, Nandita’s father-in-law
- Ranjini Menon as Seemandini Krishnan, Nandita's friend
- Babu Samy as Manichayan,
- Shivaji as Santhosh, Rajeevan’s elder brother
- Ambika Mohan as Rajeevan's sister-in-law(Debut Film)
- Jijoy Rajagopal as Prasad, the press photographer
- Unnikrishnan Namboothiri as Pisharadi
- Sanusha as Malavika (Malu), Nandita’s daughter.
- Baby Ansu as Hridhya
- Master Badrinath as Sourav (Kannan)
- Salim Pandiyath as Adv Razak
- Gomathy Mahadevan as Pisharadi's Sister
- Jitesh as Gazal Singer
- Bindhu Krishna as Office Staff
- Sheeba as Servant

== Soundtrack ==
The film's lyrics were written by O. N. V. Kurup and Nazim Akhtar, and the music was by Ramesh Narayan and Jithesh (Rangathu).

- "Oru Narupushpamaayi" (M) - K. J. Yesudas
- "Oru Narupushpamaayi" (F) - K. S. Chitra, Ramesh Narayan
- "Ponnushassennum" - P. Jayachandran, K. S. Chitra
- "Rangathu" - Jithesh

== Reception ==
=== Box Office ===
This movie was a commercial success at the Kerala box office in the year 2001.

=== Critical response ===
A critic from Screen wrote that "It is, no doubt, that seeing Meghmalhaar would be a really different and unforgettable experience for the viewers who have been seeing dry, stale, meaningless stuff in the name of cinema". A critic from Cinesouth wrote that "May be, by ordinary standards, this movie might not become a grand hit, but it's a good attempt at making good movies. Something that speaks about the beauty of love and of family bonds".

== Awards ==
Kerala State Film Awards

- Second Best Film
- Best Screenplay - Kamal

Kerala Film Critics Association Awards

- Best Film – Kamal (director)
- Best Editor – Beena Paul
- Best Lyricist – O. N. V. Kurup
- Best Music Director – Ramesh Narayan

Filmfare Awards South

- Best Actress - Malayalam – Samyuktha Varma
- Best Film - Malayalam – M. V. Shreyams Kumar

Asianet Film Awards

- Best Film
- Best Director - Kamal
- Best Actress - Samyuktha Varma
- Best Star Pair - Biju Menon and Samyuktha Varma
- Best Cinematographer - Venugopal
- Best Editing - Beena Paul

Other Awards

- Ramu Kariyat Award for Best Director - Kamal
