= Kamal (director) =

Indian film director

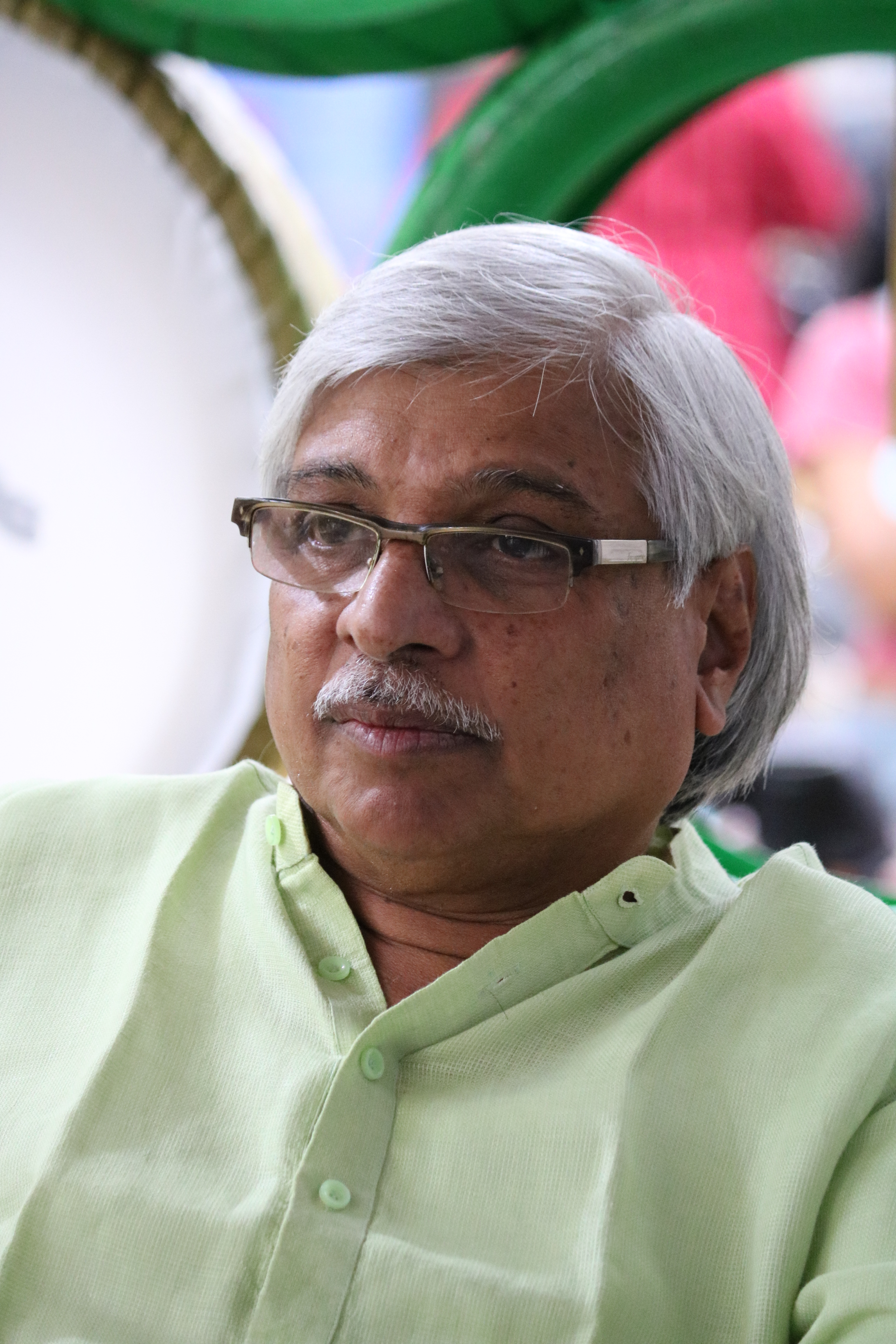
- Born: Kamaluddin Mohammed Majeed; 1957 (age 68–69); Mathilakam, Kodungallur, Thrissur, Kerala, India
- Occupation: Film director
- Years active: 1981–present
- Known for: Kakkothi Kaavile Appoppan Thaadikal (1988); Niram (1999); Karutha Pakshikal (2006); Celluloid (2013)
- Spouse: Saburabi

Kamaluddin Mohammed Majeed, mononymously known as Kamal, is an Indian film director, screenwriter, and producer who predominantly works in the Malayalam cinema. He was the former chairman of Kerala State Chalachitra Academy. Kamal made his directorial debut with the 1986 film Mizhineerppovukal. In a career spanning over three decades, Kamal has directed over forty films. His films have won various National Film Awards and Kerala State Film Awards, including for films such as Kakkothi Kaavile Appoppan Thaadikal (1988), Ulladakkam (1991), Mazhayethum Munpe (1995), Niram (1999), Madhuranombarakkattu (2000), Meghamalhar (2001), Nammal (2002), Perumazhakkalam (2004), Karutha Pakshikal (2006), and Celluloid (2013).

== Early life ==
Kamal was born as Kamaluddin Mohammed Majeed on 28 November 1957 in Kodungallur, as the eldest son of Abdul Majeed and Sulaikha Beevi. He has two younger brothers.

== Career ==
He started his career by writing the film Thrasam, directed by Padiyan in 1981. He also worked as an associate director in the film.

His first film was Mizhineer Pookkal in 1986 and to date, he has directed more than 43 movies, among which are two non-Malayalam movies, one each in Tamil and Hindi. Apart from his role as a director, Kamal has held several administrative posts within the Malayalam film industry. He had previously acted as the general secretary of the Malayalam Cine Technicians Association (MACTA) and has been an executive member of the Kerala Chalachitra Academy. He was elected president of the Kerala Directors' Union (FEFKA) in 2012.

His works include Unnikale Oru Katha Parayam, Kakkothikavile Appooppan Thadikal, Thoovalsparsham, Ghazal, Ulladakam, Ee Puzhayam Kadannu, Azhagiya Ravanan, Mazhayethum Munpe, Meghamalhar, Madhuranombarakaattu, Perumazhakkalam, Karutha Pakshikal, Khaddama and Celluloid. His interest in film-making led him to enroll at the Kalabharathi Film Institute in Thrissur.

Celluloid (2013) is the biopic of J.C Daniel, the father of Malayalam cinema. Smitha at the entertainment site, oneindia.com, stated that the film is one of the best films made in recent times from Indian cinema.

Aami is a biopic of poet and author Kamala Surayya.

== Personal life ==
Kamal's son, Jenuse Mohamed, made his debut as a film director in 2015 with the Malayalam film 100 Days of Love.

== Filmography ==
=== As director ===
- Note: all of his films are in Malayalam, except otherwise noted.

Year	Film	Writer	Notes
1986	Mizhineerppoovukal	John Paul	
1987	Unnikale Oru Kadha Parayam	John Paul	
1988	Kakkothikkavile Appooppan Thaadikal	Fazil	
1988	Orkkapurathu	Shibu Chakravarthy	
1988	Unnikrishnante Adyathe Christmas	Kaloor Dennis; John Paul	
1989	Peruvannapurathe Visheshangal	Ranjith	
1989	Pradeshika Varthakal	Ranjith	
1990	Pavam Pavam Rajakumaran	Sreenivasan	
1990	Thooval Sparsam	Kaloor Dennis	
1990	Shubhayathra	P. R. Nathan	
1991	Pookkalam Varavayi	Ranjith	
1991	Vishnulokam	T. A. Razzaq	
1991	Ulladakkam	P. Balachandran	
1992	Ennodu Ishtam Koodamo	Reghunath Paleri	
1992	Aayushkalam	Vinu Kiriyath; Rajan Kiriyath	
1992	Champakulam Thachan	Sreenivasan	
1993	Ghazal	T. A. Razzaq	
1993	Bhoomigeetham	T. A. Razzaq	
1995	Mazhayethum Munpe	Sreenivasan	
1996	Azhakiya Ravanan	Sreenivasan	
1996	Ee Puzhayum Kadannu	Shatrughnan	
1997	Krishnagudiyil Oru Pranayakalathu	Yes	
1998	Kaikudunna Nilavu	Ranjith	
1998	Ayal Kadha Ezhuthukayanu	Sreenivasan	
1999	Niram	Shathrughnan	25th Film
2000	Madhuranombarakkattu	Reghunath Paleri	
2001	Meghamalhar	Yes	
2001	Piriyadha Varam Vendum	Yes	Tamil film
2002	Nammal	Kalavoor Ravikumar	
2003	Gramaphone	Iqbal Kuttippuram	
2003	Swapnakoodu	Iqbal Kuttippuram	
2004	Manjupole Oru Penkutty	Kalavoor Ravikumar	
2004	Perumazhakkalam	T. A. Razzaq	
2005	Zameer: The Fire Within	Sreenivasan	Hindi film
2005	Rappakal	T. A. Razzaq	
2006	Pachakkuthira	T. A. Shahid	
2006	Karutha Pakshikal	Yes	
2007	Goal	Kalavoor Ravikumar	
2008	Minnaminnikoottam	Yes	
2010	Aagathan	Kalavoor Ravikumar	
2011	Gaddama	K. Gireesh Kumar	
2011	Swapna Sanchari	K. Gireesh Kumar	
2013	Celluloid	Yes	Also producer
2013	Nadan	Suresh Babu	
2015	Utopiayile Rajavu	P. S. Rafeeque	
2018	Aami	Yes	
2019	Pranaya Meenukalude Kadal	John Paul	
2024	Vivekanandan Viralanu	Yes	

=== As associate director ===
Year	Film	Director
1982	Chillu	Lenin Rajendran
1984	Oru Kochu Swapnam	Vipin Das
1985	Aa Neram Alpadooram	Thampi Kannanthanam
1985	Avidathepole Ivideyum	K. S. Sethumadhavan
1985	Ayanam	Harikumar

=== As screenwriter ===
Year	Film
1980	Kaavalmaadam
1981	Thrasam
1983	Kadamba
1985	Aa Neram Alpadooram
1986	Sunil Vayassu 20
1997	Krishnagudiyil Oru Pranayakalathu
2001	Meghamalhar
2002	Gramophone
2003	Swapnakkoodu
2006	Karutha Pakshikal
2008	Minnaminnikoottam
2010	Aagathan
2013	Celluloid

=== As actor ===
- Rekhachithram (2025) as himself

== Awards and nominations ==
=== National Film Awards ===
- 2005– Best Film on Other Social Issues for Perumazhakkalam
- 2007– Best Film on Family Welfare for Karutha Pakshikal
- 2013– Best Feature Film in Malayalam for Celluloid

=== Kerala State Film Award ===
- 1991 Best Director for Ulladakkam
- 1995 Best Popular Film for Mazhayethum Munpe
- 2000 Second Best Feature Film for Madhuranombarakkattu
- 2001 Second Best Feature Film for Meghamalhar
- 2001 Best Screen Play for Meghamalhar
- 2002 Best Popular Film for Nammal
- 2013 Best Film for Celluloid

=== Kerala Film Critics Association Awards ===
- 1995 Second Best Film for Mazhayethum Munpe
- 1996 Second Best Film for Ee Puzhayum Kadannu
- 1999 Second Best Film for Niram
- 2001 Best Film for Meghamalhar
- 2002 Second Best Film for Nammal
- 2004 Best Film for Perumazhakkalam
- 2004 Best Director for Perumazhakkalam
- 2006 Best Film for Karutha Pakshikal
- 2006 Best Director for Karutha Pakshikal
- 2010 Best Film for Khaddama
- 2010 Best Director for Khaddama
- 2012 Best Film for Celluloid
- 2012 Best Director for Celluloid

=== Asianet Film Awards ===
- 2001: Asianet Film Award for Best Director- Meghamalhar
