= Janani (1999 film) =

- Directed by: Rajeevnath
- Screenplay by: Zachariah; Rajeevnath
- Story by: Renji Panicker
- Starring: Siddique
- Cinematography: Suresh P Nair
- Edited by: Beena Paul
- Music by: Ouseppachan
- Production company: Chitranjali
- Release date: 1999
- Country: India
- Language: Malayalam

Janani is a 1999 Indian Malayalam film, directed by Rajeevnath, starring Siddique in the lead role. Rajeevnath won the National Film Award for Best Direction.

== Synopsis ==
The film is about seven nuns who take care of an orphaned baby.

== Cast ==
- Siddique as Father
- Roslin as Sister Victoria
- Santhakumari as Servant Eliyamma
- Kavitha Ladnier as Sister Mary Ann
- Bobby Kottarakkara as Kuttichan
- Latheef as Doctor
- Rukhmini

== Soundtrack ==
The soundtrack of the film was composed by Ouseppachan, with lyrics penned by Kavalam Narayana Panicker, John Panickal, and Gireesh Puthenchery.

Soundtrack Album
#	Song	Lyrics	Singers
1	"Athyunnathangal"	Kavalam Narayana Panicker	K. J. Yesudas
2	"Bhoomukham Kaanum"	John Panickal	K. J. Yesudas
3	"Kunjikunjomana"	Kavalam Narayana Panicker	K. J. Yesudas
4	"Kunjikunjomana"	Kavalam Narayana Panicker	K. S. Chithra
5	"Manjaadi Manikkutta"	Kavalam Narayana Panicker	Sujatha Mohan
6	"Nasrethil Uyarnnoru Nakshthram"	John Panickal	M. G. Sreekumar
7	"Niraamayaa Nee Varavaayi"	Gireesh Puthenchery	Sreenivas
8	"Venalkkariyila"	Kavalam Narayana Panicker	K. S. Chithra

== Awards ==
Kerala Film Critics Association Awards

- Best Female Playback Singer - Sujatha Mohan

== Reception ==
Reviewing the film at the Palm Springs Film Festival in 2000, Robert Koehler of Variety opined that "What appears to be a drama about how an elderly nun will fit into convent culture dissolves into random sequences of various innocuous relationships".
