= Karayilekku Oru Kadal Dooram =

- Theatrical Release poster
- Directed by: Vinod Mankara
- Written by: Vinod Mankara
- Produced by: Siddiq Mankara
- Starring: Indrajith; Mamta Mohandas; Dhanya Mary Varghese
- Cinematography: Bejoys
- Edited by: Mahesh Narayanan
- Music by: M. Jayachandran
- Production company: Chithranjali Studios
- Distributed by: ITL Entertainments
- Release date: 31 December 2010
- Running time: 110 minutes
- Country: India
- Language: Malayalam

Karayilekku Oru Kadal Dooram (English: A Sea Away to the Shore) is a 2010 Malayalam fantasy film directed by Vinod Mankara, starring Indrajith, Mamta Mohandas, and Dhanya Mary Varghese in the lead roles.

== Plot ==
Anoop Chandran is a famous writer and award winner. Prone to seeing future events that turn out to be real, Anoop one day sees his own death in a trance. He decides to write one final novel before death. He has a wife, Meera, who never understands the writer in him. At the same time, he is in love with dancer Gatha, with whom he shares a live-in relationship. Anoop always tells Gatha about Sathyabhama, who was his lover in college. Excited about hearing Sathyabhama aka Bhama, Gatha wants to locate Bhama and goes to Anoop's tharavadu (ancestral house) with him. From there, they go to Bhama's birthplace, Vattakkulam, which incidentally is the birthplace of Gatha's parents as well. They return, unsuccessful in finding Bhama. Gatha goes to Kolkata for her dance performances while Anoop returns to Kerala. Three months later, Gatha gets a call from Anoop. She is shocked to hear that there was no one named Bhama, and she was an imaginary character created by Anoop for his final novel. Anoop was developing Bhama's story through Gatha. He tells Gatha that he sent the novel to her and she has the right to give it a title and publish it. He also tells her that he is about to reach the end of his life, which he realised some time back. In the final scene, Anoop is seen heading to some remote destination in the snow-clad mountains, to embrace his death.

== Cast ==
- Indrajith as Anoop Chandran
- Mamta Mohandas as Gadha
- Dhanya Mary Varghese as Jayalakshmi
- Lakshmi Sharma as Devi
- Sarayu as Meera
- T. P. Madhavan as Kunjoottan
- Jagadish as Doctor Sudheendran
- Geetha Vijayan as Lathika, Anoop's mother
- M. Jayachandran as himself
- Kochu Preman as Shekharan
- Valsala Menon as Anoop's grandmother
- Kozhikode Narayanan Nair as Sreedhara Pisharadi
- Narayanankutty as Hari, Postman
- Ambika Mohan as Janaki
- Kalabhavan Haneef as the man in bar
- Nisha Sarang as Bhanu

== Accolades ==
- Vinod Mankara won the 2010 Kerala Film Critics Award for the Best Debutant Director.
- M Jayachandran won the 2010 Kerala State Film Award for Best Music Director.

== Soundtrack ==
Karayilekku Oru Kadal Dooram

Soundtrack album by M. Jayachandran
- Recorded: Satyam Audios
- Genre: Film soundtrack
- Label: Satyam Audios
- Producer: ITL Productions

All lyrics are written by O. N. V. Kurup, Vinod Mankara and K. Satchidanandan; all music is composed by M. Jayachandran.

No.	Title	Artist(s)	Length
1.	"Hridayathin"	K. J. Yesudas
2.	"Chithrasalabhame"	Madhu Balakrishnan, K. S. Chithra
3.	"Pachila"	Sujatha Mohan
4.	"Nee Illa Enkil"	M. Jayachandran
5.	"Hridayathin"	K. S. Chithra
6.	"Thanthane Thane"	Janardhannan Puthuserry
7.	"Pachilachartham"	G. Venugopal

The music director M. Jayachandran makes an appearance in the film as himself, performing the song "Nee Illa Enkil".
