= Aa Neram Alppa Dooram =

1985 film directed by Thampi Kannanthanam

- Directed by: Thampi Kannanthanam
- Written by: Thampi Kannanthanam; Kamal (dialogues)
- Screenplay by: Thampi Kannanthanam
- Produced by: E. K. Thyagarajan
- Starring: Mammootty; Jose Prakash; Manavalan Joseph; Siddique
- Cinematography: Babulal
- Edited by: K. Sankunni
- Music by: Johnson
- Production company: Sree Murugalaya Films
- Distributed by: Sree Murugalaya Films
- Release date: 1 November 1985
- Country: India
- Language: Malayalam

Aa Neram Alppa Dooram (മലയാളം: ആ നേരം അല്പദൂരം) is a 1985 Indian Malayalam- language Revenge film, directed by Thampi Kannanthanam and produced by E. K. Thyagarajan. The film stars Mammootty, Jose Prakash, Manavalan Joseph and Siddique in the lead roles. The film has musical score by Johnson.

== Cast ==
- Mammootty as Jammeskutty
- Jose Prakash as Muthalali
- Manavalan Joseph
- Siddique as Alex
- Lissy Priyadarshan as Valsala
- Unnimary as Rani
- Lalu Alex as Dinesh Varma
- M. G. Soman as Sudhakaran
- Seema as Amminikutty
- Sreerekha
- Kollam G. K. Pillai
- Disco Shanti as a dancer

== Production ==
Mammootty approached Kamal to write dialogues for the film though Kamal initially was uninterested to pen dialogues as "Thampy's idea of filmmaking was not something that I shared" though he agreed as he knew Thampy from his days as assistant director. Thampy wanted to cast Lalu Alex as antagonist however on the insistence of a person called as Kora Chettan in industry circles, he decided to cast Siddique in that role. After Thampy came to know Siddique who was then a college student went to abroad, he "lost interest in Siddique" and roped Lalu Alex. Thampy who was surprised to see Siddique turning up at the sets gave him a small role in the film not to disappoint him.

== Soundtrack ==
The music was composed by Johnson and the lyrics were written by Poovachal Khader.

No.	Song	Singers	Lyrics	Length (m:ss)
1	"Akaleyaay Kilipaadukayaayi"	K. S. Chithra	Poovachal Khader	

== Release ==
The film failed at box-office. In a 2018 interview with Safari TV, Dennis Joseph told that the failure of the film affected Mammootty very much and he was not keen on working with Kannanthanam again. The incident created a permanent rift between them.
