= Shilpa Raju =

- Genres: Playback singing,
- Years active: 2013–present

Shilpa Raju is an Indian playback singer, working in the Malayalam film industry.

== Contests ==
She was the M.G. University arts fest winner in 2011 and 2012 for light music and Kavithaparayanam, respectively. In 2002, she participated in Twinkle Stars, a musical contest in Jeevan, winning first prize. In 2007, she participated in Ragalayam, a music contest on Surya and was first runner up. In 2010 she participated in Idea Star Singer Season 5 and was one of the top ten contestants. Reality shows 2007 - Little Masters on Asianet Plus - 1st Runner Up. 2008 - Gandharvasangeetham on Kairali TV - 3rd Runner Up. 2010 - Idea Star Singer on Asianet .

She was a finalist in the Asianet Idea Star Singer 2011–12 season. She got her chance at stardom in Mollywood with a duet in the movie, Just Married.
