= Kerala Film Critics Association Award for Best Film =

Annual Indian film award

The Kerala Film Critics Association Award for Best Film is an award presented annually at the Kerala Film Critics Association Awards of India to the best Malayalam film released in the previous year.

== Winners ==
Year	Film	Director	Ref.
1977	Yuddha Kandam	Thoppil Bhasi	
1978	Thampu	G. Aravindan	
1979	Thakara	Bharathan	
1980	Manjil Virinja Pookkal	Fazil	
1981	Vida Parayum Munpe	Mohan	
1982	Yavanika	K. G. George	
1983	Koodevide	P. Padmarajan	
1984	Mukhamukham	Adoor Gopalakrishnan	
1985	Anubandham	I. V. Sasi	
1986	Meenamasathile Sooryan	Lenin Rajendran	
1987	Purushartham	K. R. Mohanan	
1988	Piravi	Shaji N. Karun	
1989	Mathilukal	Adoor Gopalakrishnan	
1990	Perumthachan	Ajayan	
1991	Bharatham	Sibi Malayil	
1992	Venkalam	Bharathan	
1993	Vidheyan	Adoor Gopalakrishnan	
1994	Swaham	Shaji N. Karun	
1994	Sukrutham	Harikumar	
1995	Kathapurushan	Adoor Gopalakrishnan	
1996	Desadanam	Jayaraj	
1997	Ennu Swantham Janakikutty	Hariharan	
1997	Kaliyattam	Jayaraj	
1998	Agnisakshi	Shyamaprasad	
1999	Vanaprastham	Shaji N. Karun	
2000	Susanna	T. V. Chandran	
2001	Sesham	T. K. Rajeev Kumar	
2001	Meghamalhar	Kamal	
2002	Nandanam	Ranjith	
2003	Padam Onnu Oru Vilapam	T. V. Chandran	
2004	Kazhcha	Blessy	
2004	Perumazhakkalam	Kamal	
2005	Anandabhadram	Santosh Sivan	
2006	Karutha Pakshikal	Kamal	
2007	Ore Kadal	Shyamaprasad	
2007	Thaniye	Babu Thiruvalla	
2008	Thalappavu	Madhupal	
2008	Thirakkatha	Ranjith	
2009	Kerala Varma Pazhassi Raja	Hariharan	
2009	Evidam Swargamanu	Rosshan Andrrews	
2010	Khaddama	Kamal	
2011	Pranayam	Blessy	
2012	Celluloid	Kamal	
2013	Drishyam	Jeethu Joseph	
2014	Ottaal	Jayaraj	
2014	Iyobinte Pusthakam	Amal Neerad	
2015	Ennu Ninte Moideen	R. S. Vimal	
2016	Oppam	Priyadarshan	
2017	Thondimuthalum Driksakshiyum	Dileesh Pothan	
2018	Oru Kuprasidha Payyan	Madhupal	
2019	Jallikattu	Lijo Jose Pellissery	
2020	The Great Indian Kitchen	Jeo Baby	
2021	Aavasavyuham	Krishand	
2022	Headmaster	Rajeevnath	
2022	B 32 Muthal 44 Vare	Shruthi Sharanyam	
2023	Aattam	Anand Ekarshi	

== See also ==
- Kerala Film Critics Association Award for Second Best Film
