= Nandanam (film) =

2002 film directed by Ranjith

- DVD cover
- Directed by: Ranjith
- Written by: Ranjith
- Produced by: Siddique; Ranjith
- Starring: Navya Nair; Prithviraj Sukumaran; Aravind Akash
- Cinematography: Alagappan N.
- Edited by: Ranjan Abraham
- Music by: Raveendran; C. Rajamani (score)
- Production company: Bhavana Cinema
- Distributed by: Kokers Films
- Release date: 20 December 2002 (India)
- Running time: 150 minutes
- Country: India
- Language: Malayalam

Nandanam (transl. Heavenly Garden of Krishna) is a 2002 Indian Malayalam-language fantasy romantic drama film written, co-produced and directed by Ranjith. The film stars Navya Nair, Aravind Akash, Prithviraj Sukumaran, Kaviyoor Ponnamma, Revathi, Siddique and Saikumar. Playback singer K. J. Yesudas and Sudheesh make guest appearances. The film won four Kerala State Film Awards and two Filmfare Awards South awards. This film was remade in Tamil as Seedan.

== Plot ==
Balamani is an orphan who works as a maid to Unniamma, the aging matriarch of the Ambalappattil family, and lives with her in the large mansion. She has a photo of Guruvayurappan in her room, which she lights a lamp every day and talks to Lord Krishna as though she is talking to a friend. Despite being an ardent devotee of Guruvayurappan (Lord Krishna), she is not allowed to go to the sacred temple, even though the temple being close to the house. Every time she plans to go, something goes wrong. It is said that no one can visit Guruvayur temple until they are allowed by Lord Krishna. This makes Balamani believe that God does not want her to go. She is smitten by the love and affection from Unniamma who treats her like her granddaughter. She is also friendly with her neighbour, Janaki, who tells her that her son Unnikrishnan would be returning to the village. Balamani tells her that she would meet him but soon forgets this because of all the work she has.

One day, Unniamma's grandson Manu arrives in Ambalappattil to spend time with his grandmother. Manu has been raised by a loving single mother who lives in Bangalore. Bala recognizes him from a dream she had where she marries him in front of the Guruvayur temple. He begins to show affection towards Bala which she reciprocates. However, she tells him that people would not approve of them as he belongs to a high-class family and she is a servant. Soon, Manu's mother, Thankam arrives from Bangalore. She plans to get Manu married before he leaves for the US, and has already fixed his wedding. She takes an instant liking to Bala but is unaware of Manu and Bala's love for each other. Bala asks Manu to keep it that way as she does not want to upset Unniamma and Thankam.

Meanwhile, Bala meets a man who introduces himself as Unnikrishnan. She remembers that Janaki had told her that her son would soon return and a friendship forms between them. She refers to him as Unniettan, who becomes very supportive of Bala. Manu's marriage date is fixed, however, Thankam finds about the truth behind Manu and Balamani's love for each other. She asks Manu why he did not tell her earlier, who reveals that he did not want to break her heart and that she has always done the right thing for him.

She tells him that the only thing that could break her heart is to see him sad. She apologises to Manu and Bala, as it is too late to call the wedding off. Bala meets Unni and tells him that God is hurting her even though she always believed in him, and does not expect anything. Unni replies with a smile that she should not lose faith and that everything will work out in the end.

The next day, all of the relatives arrive at Ambalapattil and the marriage preparations begin. On the day of the wedding, the bride elopes with her boyfriend. Thankam suggests that Bala should marry Manu but the family, however the relatives oppose.

This causes a humiliated Bala to leave, but Unniamma stops her. She pacifies the relatives and tells them that if Manu and Bala love each other, no one should stop them. Balamani and Manu get married, and as they go to meet Unniettan, they are surprised when someone else turns up instead of the Unniettan Balamani knows. After realising this, she runs to the temple with Manu, but they cannot enter, as it is sealed. They manage to convince the police to let them cross the first barricade, and there she sees the Unniettan she knows near the main temple who smiles at her and disappears. She realizes that Guruvayurappan had been with her all along in the form of a friend.

== Cast ==
- Navya Nair as Balamani
- Prithviraj Sukumaran as Manu Nandakumar
- Aravind Akash as Unnikrishnan (voiced by Sudheesh)
- Kaviyoor Ponnamma as Ambalappattil Unniyamma, Manu's maternal grandmother
- Revathi as Thankam Nandakumar, Unniyamma's daughter and Manu's mother (voiced by Bhagyalakshmi)
- Siddique as Balachandran, Unniyamma's family friend
- Innocent as Kesavan Nair
- Jagathy Sreekumar as Kumbidi Swamy / Palarivattom Sasi
- Kalaranjini as Janaki, Unnikrishnan's mother and Thankam's friend (voiced by Urvashi)
- Saikumar as Ramadasan, Unniyamma's second son and Thankam's elder brother
- Vijayakumari as Parukutty Amma
- Subbalakshmi as Veshamani Ammal
- Meena Ganesh as Karthyayani Amma
- N. F. Varghese as Sreedharan, Unniyamma's nephew
- Jagannatha Varma as Ambalappattil Madhava Menon, Unniyamma's relative
- Kozhikode Narayanan Nair as Shankarammavan, Unniyamma's relative
- Sadiq as Vijayan, Unniyamma's nephew
- Mala Aravindan as Sankaran Mooshari
- Kalabhavan Mani as Mahadevan, son of Sankaran Mooshari
- Jagadeesh as Elder son of Sankaran Mooshari
- Augustine as Kunjiraman, the cook
- V. K. Sreeraman as Vishwanatha Menon, Unniymma's eldest son and Nandhini's father
- Zeenath as Unniyamma's niece
- Subair as Venu Menon
- Jolly Easo as Sumam Venu, Thankam's friend
- Jyothirmayi as daughter of Venu Menon and Manu's fiancée (cameo)
- Bindu Ramakrishnan as Unniyamma's relative
- Ambika Mohan as Unniyamma's relative
- Nivia Rebin as Unniyamma's relative
- Sukumaran as Nandakumar, Thankam's late husband and Manu's father (Photo presence only)
- Gayathri as Shakunthala, Janaki's maid
- Sudheesh as the real Unnikrishnan (cameo)
- K. J. Yesudas as himself (cameo)

== Production ==
This movie was shot in Paliyam Kovilakam in Paravoor.

== Music ==
Nandanam

Soundtrack album by Raveendran
- Released: 2002
- Genre: Film
- Label: Satyam Audios
- Producers: Siddique, Ranjith

The most critically acclaimed and popular songs of this film were written by Gireesh Puthenchery and composed by Raveendran. The songs were chart for weeks and the song "Karmukil Varnante" became highly popular and Girish Puthenchery and Raveendran won Kerala State Film Award for Best Lyricist and Best Music Director respectively and also K.S. Chithra won Kerala State Film Award for Best Female Playback Singer of the year 2004. The song "Manassil Midhuna Mazha" along with its dance featuring Balamani (Navya) and Unnikrishnan (Aravind) was highly popular.

Track	Song	Singer(s)	Raga
1	"Sreelavasantham"	Dr. K.J. Yesudas	Yamuna Kalyani
2	"Manassil"	M.G. Sreekumar, Radhika Thilak	Naatta
3	"Aarum"	P. Jayachandran, Sujatha	Shuddha Dhanyasi
4	"Mouliyil"	K. S. Chithra	Mohanam
5	"Gopike"	Dr. K.J. Yesudas	Megh
6	"Karmukil"	K.S. Chithra	Harikambhoji
7	"Aarum"	Sujatha	Shuddha Dhanyasi, Abhogi
8	"Manassil"	M.G. Sreekumar	Naatta

== Reception ==
=== Box office ===
The film was a commercial success at the box office.

Indiainfo wrote, "Nandhanam by Ranjith could not gain commercial success but has high opinion on its artistic qualities. It has established Prithviraj in Malayalam cinema as an actor of wide range. The emotional content and its dramatic appeal have caught the attention of filmmakers."

== Accolades ==
Kerala State Film Awards

- Best Actress – Navya Nair
- Best Female Playback Singer – K. S. Chithra
- Best Music Director – Raveendran
- Kerala State Film Award for Best Lyrics – Girish Puthenchery

Kerala Film Critics Association Awards

- Best Film – Ranjith (director)
- Best Director – Ranjith
- Best Actress – Navya Nair
- Best Supporting Actor – Prithviraj Sukumaran
- Best Cinematographer – Alagappan N.
- Best Art Director – Suresh Kollam
- Best Male Playback Singer – M. G. Sreekumar

Filmfare Awards South

- Best Film (Malayalam) – Siddique and Ranjith (producers)
- Best Actress (Malayalam) – Navya Nair

Asianet Film Awards

- Best Film – Ranjith (director)
- Best Actress – Navya Nair

== Sequel series ==
A sequel to the film, a mythological series under same title was aired on Flowers TV. It tells about childhood stories of Balamani. It also features the characters of the film Manu, Kumbidi and Krishnan Nair but played by different actors. It was originally intended to air on Surya TV as Yadhu Nandanam, but was shifted to Flowers TV due to some technical difficulties. It aired from 4 August 2020 to 29 September 2022 for 534 episodes.

== Remakes ==
Ranjith worked on a Tamil remake of the film which was shelved after some pre-production complications, and the movie was remade as Seedan by Subramaniya Siva, which also marked the film debut of Malayalam actor Unni Mukundan. It was also remade in Telugu as Maa Bapu Bommaku Pellanta by Ravi Raja Pinisetty.

== Legacy ==
Aravind Akash reappeared in the 2024 Malayalam film Guruvayoor Ambalanadayil reprising the role of Unnikrishnan, which he had done in the film.
