= Kakkothikkavile Appooppan Thaadikal =

- Promotional poster designed by P. N. Menon
- കാക്കോത്തിക്കാവിലെ അപ്പൂപ്പൻ താടികൾ
- Directed by: Kamal
- Screenplay by: Fazil
- Story by: Madhu Muttam
- Produced by: Ousepachan Vaalakuzhy; Fazil
- Starring: Revathi; Ambika; V. K. Sreeraman; Krishnan Kutty Nair; Surasu; N. L. Balakrishnanan; Philomina, etc.
- Cinematography: Vipin Mohan
- Edited by: T. R. Sekhar
- Music by: Ouseppachan; Lyrics: Bichu Thirumala
- Release date: 8 January 1988
- Country: India
- Language: Malayalam

Kakkothikkavile Appooppan Thaadikal (English: transl. Woolly pods of Kakkothikkavu) is a 1988 Indian Malayalam-language drama film produced jointly by Ousepachan Vaalakuzhy and Fazil, directed by Kamal and written by Fazil. The film is heroine-oriented, in which Revathi and Ambika play the lead roles. It features original songs composed by Ouseppachan, and the cinematography is done by Vipin Mohan.

The film is pictured in rural locations, such as Pandalam, Kudassanad, and Venmony. It includes many sequences in school settings and of gypsy life. The film was a sleeper hit at the box office. Revathi won the Filmfare Award for Best Actress for her performance in this film. The movie wasn't a commercial success when it was released, but it got a huge fan following after becoming available on Cassette / CD and when it came on TV.

== Plot ==
The film is about two sisters who were separated in early childhood. One day, a beggar comes to their house and asks for some water. Leaving the young sister in the courtyard, the elder sister goes to fetch water and returns to find the beggar vanished along with her sister.

The second part of the film progresses through the life of a schoolboy, Murali, who is scoffed at in his school because of his poor background. One day, Murali skips his studies and runs away with some gypsies. He becomes good friends with a gypsy girl whom he names Kakkothi, after a local legend. Kakkothi is being hunted by a beggar who wants her for his nefarious purposes. In the meantime, Murali's school teacher Valsala enquires about Murali's background and recognizes his pitiable condition.

One day, the school teacher finds him and persuades him to stay at her house and study. Later, Kakkothi comes across Murali and insists that as a friend, he should stay with her. After their tents are raided, Murali convinces her of the goodness of his school teacher and takes her to the teacher's house. On seeing the teacher's house, Kakkothi reminisces about her past. She finds her own childhood photo in the house. She was in fact the girl kidnapped by the beggar years ago. Frantic, she then runs away from the house. The beggar who is hunting her closes in on her. Just like the Kakkothi legend, she kills the beggar in self-protection. Both sisters recognize each other and embrace in joy.

== Cast ==
- Revathi as Lakshmi (Vavachi), Kakkothi
  - Raasi as Young Lakshmi in Malayalam Credited as Manthra
- Renny as Murali
- Ambika as Valsala
  - Kaveri as Young Valsala
- V. K. Sreeraman as Poovachu the evil beggar
- Krishnan Kutty Nair as Mathai aka Kalan Mathai
- M. S. Thripunithura as the father of Valsala and Lekshmi
- Surasu as male beggar
- Philomina as female beggar
- Mela Raghu
- K. B. Ganesh Kumar
- Appa Haja

== Soundtrack ==
The music was composed by Ouseppachan and the lyrics were written by Bichu Thirumala.

No.	Song	Singers	Lyrics	Length (m:ss)
1	"Kaakkothiyammaykku"	Janamma David, Malaysia Vasudevan, S. P. Sailaja	Bichu Thirumala	4:22
2	"Kannaam Thumpee"	K. S. Chithra	Bichu Thirumala	3:48
3	"Kannaam Thumpee" (Sad)	K. S. Chithra	Bichu Thirumala	3:11
4	"Nannangaadikal"	K. S. Chithra, Malaysia Vasudevan, S. P. Sailaja	Bichu Thirumala	3:28

The song "Kannam Thumpee" by K.S Chithra, rose to popularity and is to date sung by many as a lullaby for children in Kerala and a small portion is reused in the 2024 movie Guruvayoor Ambalanadayil.
