= Parasparam =

1983 Indian Malayalam-language film

- Directed by: Shajiyem
- Written by: Shajiyem
- Screenplay by: V. R. Gopinath, Shajiyem
- Produced by: Jose Brothers
- Starring: Venu Nagavally, Zarina Wahab
- Cinematography: Vipin Mohan
- Edited by: G. Murali
- Music by: M. B. Sreenivasan
- Production company: Jose Brothers Films
- Release date: 1983
- Country: India
- Language: Malayalam

Parasparam is a 1983 Indian Malayalam-language film, written and directed by Shajiyem and produced by Jose Brothers. The film stars Venu Nagavally, Zarina Wahab. The film had musical score by MB Sreenivasan.

== Cast ==
- Venu Nagavally as Vishwanathan
- Zarina Wahab as Meera
- Nedumudi Venu as Jagadish
- Sankaradi as Appachan
- Jagathy Sreekumar as Jerry
- Kunchan as Sudheer Kumar
- Shailesh Pandey
- Rajkumar Sethupathi as Issac
- Kanakalatha as College student
- Sukumari as Geetha's mother
- Nanditha Bose as Madam
- Sunanda as Geetha
- Jagannatha Varma as Geetha's father
- E. A. Rajendran as Jeevan
- Geetha as Gracy

== Soundtrack ==
The music was composed by M. B. Sreenivasan with lyrics by O. N. V. Kurup.

No.	Song	Singers	Lyrics	Length (m:ss)
1	"Anantha Neela Vinnil"	K. J. Yesudas, Chorus	O. N. V. Kurup	04:04
2	"Kilivaathilinarikil"	K. J. Yesudas, S. Janaki	O. N. V. Kurup	03:18
3	"Nirangal Than Nritham"	S. Janaki	O. N. V. Kurup	04:05
4	"Nirangal Than Nritham" (Pathos)	S. Janaki	O. N. V. Kurup	03:05
