= Aksharangal =

- Promotional Poster designed by Kitho
- Directed by: I. V. Sasi
- Written by: M. T. Vasudevan Nair
- Screenplay by: M. T. Vasudevan Nair
- Produced by: Rosamma George
- Starring: Mammootty; Bharath Gopi; Seema; Suhasini
- Cinematography: Jayanan Vincent
- Edited by: K. Narayanan
- Music by: Shyam
- Production company: JMJ Arts
- Distributed by: JMJ Arts
- Release date: 9 March 1984
- Country: India
- Language: Malayalam

Aksharangal is a 1984 Indian Malayalam-language film directed by I. V. Sasi and produced by Rosamma George. The film stars Mammootty, Bharath Gopi, Seema and Suhasini. The film has musical score by Shyam.

== Plot ==
Jayadevan reads a poem at a library function and is noticed by prominent literary figure VP Menon. Menon tells it to his sister Bharathi and even gets him a job as proof reader at a newspaper. Jayadevan lives in a rented house with neighbour writer Kumaran and his two daughters Geetha and Nalini. Though Geetha has her own problems of not getting married because her father cannot pay dowry, and also not getting a job because she could not study beyond 10th class, she is still a source of encouragement for Jayadevan's literary activities. Once when Jayadevan becomes intimate with her, she accepts it only for both to get scolded by Kumaran. But when she realises Jayadevan has affection for Bharathi, she keeps away from him. When Menon learns about the relation between Jayadevan and Bharathi, he rebukes him for falling for petty things like romance. He tries to make Bharathi understand that a writer's life is wayward and she would not be able to hand it. A disturbed Jayadevan decides to forget Bharathi and get on with his job and writing; he becomes intimate with Geetha. Bharathi tells Menon not to look for any other alliance for her if not for Jayadevan. Finally, Jayadevan leaves Geetha and marries Bharathi.

Jayadevan's first novel becomes a success. Friends, functions and recognition introduces him to alcohol. His relation with Bharathi starts to crack when she occasionally reminds him of Geetha's inspirations and wonders if he still visits her. When his second work does not repeat the success, alcohol becomes an addiction which breaks his relation with Menon. Bharathi tries to support Jayadevan but his frustration makes him leaves Bharathi who later finds him at Geetha's home and accuses her of being a slut who stole him because he is rich and well-known. This hurts Geetha badly.

Later, Geetha, who works as theatre actress asks Jayadevan to write a play. He tries to seduce her but she refuses saying she does not want to incur the wrath of Bharathi again. The play becomes a huge success and tours around the country. When she comes back, Geetha later finds Jayadevan destitute, without job, without home and constantly drunk. She takes him to her home. She tries all she can to bring him back to his old self. Jayadevan finds it tough but he overcomes his drinking habit. He gets intimate with Geetha. Geetha asks Menon's help and he gets Jayadevan a job. Jayadevan writes a third novel which becomes a huge success. More works follow. Awards. Recognition. Padmashri. Jayadevan is into his middle-age. He invites Geetha to accompany him to a felicitation but Menon asks him to refrain from it out of fear of scandals. Jayadevan is ready to face it but Geetha makes him understand and watches from far as Jayadevan is felicitated by many.

The film begins with Town Hall brimming with people gathered for the felicitation of Jayadevan for winning Jnanpith. News suddenly breaks out that he has been hospitalised after suffering a heart attack on his way to the function. He is admitted to ICU. Menon arrives at the hospital. Geetha follows later. Bharathi is informed but stays back home. Through the recollections of these three people, we get to know the story. Later, Geetha leaves the hospital, visits Bharathi and tells her about the abuse long back, that Geetha had stolen Jayadevan in his prime; Geetha explains that she found Jayadevan when he was on the street, bought him back to glory and wants nothing more. She requests Bharathi to go to the hospital. When she reaches the hospital, Menon informs her that Jayadevan has died and had asked for Bharathi towards the last. The body is kept for public mourning at Town Hall with Bharathi crying beside the body and Geetha watching from far. The body is covered with wreaths and flowers. After the body and the gathering leave the hall, Geetha walks to the stage, finds a frame of flowers where the body was laid and touches the spot where Jayadevan's feet was.

== Cast ==
- Mammootty as Jayadevan
- Bharath Gopi as V. P. Menon
- Seema as Geetha
- Suhasini as Bharathi
- Sankaradi as Writer Kumaran
- Charuhasan as Doctor
- Prathapachandran as Editor Varghese
- Janardanan as Theatre Artist Babujose
- Nellikode Bhaskaran as Krishnan Nair
- Sabitha Anand as Nalini

== Release ==
The film released on 9 March 1984.

== Soundtrack ==
The music was composed by Shyam.

No.	Song	Singers	Lyrics	Length (m:ss)
1	"Alasathaa Vilasitham"	S. Janaki, Unni Menon, Chorus	O. N. V. Kurup	
2	"Karutha Thonikkaara"	S. Janaki, P. Jayachandran	O. N. V. Kurup	
3	"Oru Manjuthulliyil"	K. J. Yesudas	O. N. V. Kurup	
4	"Thozhuthu Madangum"	Unni Menon	O. N. V. Kurup	
