= Manivathoorile Aayiram Sivarathrikal =

- Poster designed by P. N. Menon
- Directed by: Fazil
- Screenplay by: Fazil; Jagadish (dialogues)
- Story by: G. Omana Gangadharan
- Produced by: Appachan
- Starring: Mammootty; Suhasini; M. G. Soman; Devan; Anila
- Cinematography: Anandakuttan
- Edited by: T. R. Shekhar
- Music by: M. B. Sreenivasan
- Production company: Swargachithra
- Distributed by: Gandhimathi Films
- Release date: 4 September 1987
- Running time: 135 minutes
- Country: India
- Language: Malayalam

Manivathoorile Aayiram Sivarathrikal (English: The 1000 Sivarathries of Manivathoor) is 1987 Malayalam film, starring Mammootty and directed by Fazil. It was the last film of the eminent music director M. B. Sreenivasan, who died less than a year after the film was released.

== Plot ==
Thirteen-year-old Vineetha and her father, Dr. Vinayachandran go to visit her grandfather, John Samuel, in Ooty on the death anniversary of Vineetha's mother Neena, who died in an accident. The movie flashes back to when Vinay met Neena at a church service and fell in love. Both the families, despite belonging to different religions, consented to the couple marrying. After the wedding, Vinay takes Neena to his home back in Manivathoor to meet his mother (played by Sukhumari). Neena accidentally tips over the sacred deepam, which is seen as an omen that they would not have a long married life.

== Cast ==
- Mammootty as Dr. Vinayachandran
- Suhasini as Neena
- M. G. Soman as John Samuel
- Devan as Josephkutty
- Sukumari as Lakshmi, Vinayachandran's mother
- Lizy as Rani
- Adoor Bhasi as Stephen, Neena's uncle
- Jagadish as Baby, Neena's cousin
- Anila as Vineetha
- Fahad Faasil as kid at the party

== Soundtrack ==
All lyrics are written by O. N. V. Kurup; all music is composed by M. B. Sreenivasan.

No.	Title	Artist(s)	Length
1.	"Aadiyil Edanil"	M. G. Sreekumar
2.	"Ambili Choodunna"	K. S. Chithra
3.	"Ambili Choodunna" (Female)	K. S. Chithra, Choir
4.	"Ambili Choodunna" (Male)	M. G. Sreekumar
5.	"Ithirippoovinte"	K. J. Yesudas, K. S. Chithra
6.	"Muthe Muthe" (Ithirippoovinte)	K. S. Chithra
7.	"Nettiyil Poovulla" (Female)	K. S. Chithra
8.	"Nettiyil Poovulla" (Male)	K. J. Yesudas
9.	"Oro Poovilum"	M. G Sreekumar
10.	"Oro Poovilum" (Ormathan)	K. J. Yesudas

== Box office ==
The film was one of the biggest hits of 1987 and was a blockbuster at the box office.
