= Isabella (1988 film) =

- Poster designed by P. N. Menon
- Directed by: Mohan
- Written by: Ipe Paramel; Kallikkadu Ramachandran (dialogues)
- Screenplay by: Mohan
- Produced by: GoodKnight Films
- Starring: Sumalatha; Balachandra Menon; Nedumudi Venu
- Cinematography: Saroj Padi
- Edited by: G. Murali
- Music by: Johnson; O. N. V. Kurup (Lyrics)
- Production company: Good Knight Films
- Distributed by: Good Knight Films
- Release date: 1 July 1988
- Country: India
- Language: Malayalam

Isabella is a 1988 Malayalam–language romantic drama film, directed by Mohan and starring Sumalatha in the lead, who played Isabella, a tour guide. It also stars Balachandra Menon, Nedumudi Venu, etc. The film contains evergreen love songs which are still topping charts.

== Plot ==
Isabella, a tour guide, who falls in love with Unnikrishnan, one of her customers. Unni has spent all his Singapore earned wealth for the wellbeing of his sister and family and a bachelor even in his 40s. Isabella has several family problems as her father (Alby) is dead, her mother (Maggy) has become a drunkard and her brother (Tony) is autistic. She has to be the sole breadwinner of her family. Her mentor and well-wisher is one who introduced her to Unnikrishnan.

Bella, fed up with the agony of solitude, family problems and abandonment, decides to exit from life. Unni knows the saddest news from her mentor, her only well-wisher and Unni picks his crutches once again which he threw away in hope of reunion with Bella, and leaves for his lone journey remaining and visuals fade to scrolling last cards.

== Cast ==
- Sumalatha as Isabella
- Balachandra Menon as Unnikrishna Menon
- Nedumudi Venu as a Tourist Guide
- Anand Mahadevan as Ananthu
- Ajay Menon as the receptionist
- Vettukili Prakash as Tony
- K. P. A. C. Sunny as Alby
- Asha Jayaram as Devi
- Valsala Menon
- Nanditha Bose
- Jayalalita

== Soundtrack ==
The music was composed by Johnson and the lyrics were written by O. N. V. Kurup. The song "Isabella..." has turned to a cult song and remains top rated even among today's younger generation.

No.	Song	Singers	Lyrics	Length (m:ss)
1	"Isabella"	K. J. Yesudas	O. N. V. Kurup	
2	"Mangalya Yaamam"	K. J. Yesudas, Chorus, Sethu Parvathi	O. N. V. Kurup	
3	"Neram Mangiya Neram"	K. J. Yesudas	O. N. V. Kurup	
4	"Thalir Munthiri"	S. Janaki	O. N. V. Kurup	
