= Kaattum Mazhayum =

Unreleased Indian film

- Directed by: Hari Kumar
- Screenplay by: Santhosh Aechikkanam
- Story by: Hari Kumar
- Produced by: M. C. Arun; Sudeep Karakkat
- Starring: Unni Mukundan; Lal
- Cinematography: M. J. Radhakrishnan
- Edited by: Vijaya Shankar
- Music by: M. Jayachandran
- Production company: Line of Colours
- Release date: December 2015 (IFFK)
- Running time: 118 minutes
- Country: India
- Language: Malayalam

Kaattum Mazhayum (transl. Wind and rain) is an unreleased Indian Malayalam-language drama film directed by Hari Kumar and written by Santhosh Aechikkanam. The film stars Lal and Unni Mukundan, with Meera Nandan, Irshad, Praveena, Mamukoya, Sudheesh, Balachandran Chulllikkad, Maala Parvathi, and Swasika in supporting roles. Music was composed by M. Jayachandran.

== Plot ==
Jayanarayanan is a Brahmin boy from a financially poor family. On the other hand, Haajiyar is a Muslim man from a higher financial background who is suffering from kidney failure and is in need of a kidney transplant. Jayanarayanan is in need of money for his marriage and agrees to sell his kidney. However, Lal's relatives don't want him to get the kidney transplant, as they will get his property and money after his death.

The relatives delay the transplantation by saying that an organ from a Brahmin boy cannot be taken by a Muslim, as it is not religiously correct. They ask Jayanarayanan to become Muslim in order to give the organ. Jayanarayanan agrees on the conversion, as he badly needs money for the marriage.

In the end, Lal is no longer alive when Jayanarayanan comes to Lal's home soon after converting to Islam. However, in a twist, it is shown that before Lal died, he had already given a cheque to his servant to hand over to Jayanarayanan for the financial toll his marriage took.

== Cast ==
- Unni Mukundan as Jayanarayanan
- Lal as Haajiyar
- Meera Nandan as Anjali
- Praveena as Deepa
- Irshad
- Mamukoya
- Sudheesh
- Swasika
- Balachandran Chulllikad
- Maala Parvathi
- Master Kashi

== Accolades ==
Kerala State Film Award

- 2016: Best Story - Hari Kumar

11th Habitat International Film Festival, New Delhi

- 2016: Screening

International Film Festival of Kerala

- 2015: Screening

== Plagiarism allegation ==
In 2016, Hari Kumar won the Kerala State Film Award for Best Story. However, following the award announcement, screenwriter Najeem Koya alleged that Kumar had plagiarized his story, which he had shared with him in 2013. According to Koya, Kumar had signed an agreement to credit him and provide ₹25,000 as remuneration after a complaint was filed with FEFKA. Kumar denied the allegations, asserting that the story was "101 percent" his own. He acknowledged that Koya had shared a "gist" with him during a brief encounter lasting two minutes. Kumar added that "we reached a compromise and I promised that I would give him the concept credit. Is it possible for a person to narrate a story in one minute?".
