= Ruby Jubilee Award =

Indian film award

The Ruby Jubilee Award is one of the annual awards given at the Kerala Film Critics Association Awards. It was instituted in 2016 to commemorate the 40th year of the awards and is given to honour overall contributions to Malayalam cinema.

== Winners ==
Year	Recipient	Ref.
2016	Adoor Gopalakrishnan	
2017	Indrans	
2018	—	
2019	Mammootty	
2020	Harikumar	
2021	Suresh Gopi	
2022	Kamal Haasan	
2023	Rajasenan	
2024	Jagadish	

== See also ==
- Chalachitra Ratnam Award
- Chalachitra Prathibha Award
