= Paranju Theeratha Visheshangal =

- Directed by: Harikumar
- Written by: Kaloor Dennis
- Story by: E. V. Sreedharan
- Produced by: Sheni Asok
- Starring: Suresh Gopi; Lakshmi Gopalaswamy; Janardhanan; Manya; Jagathy Sreekumar; Sukumari
- Cinematography: Sanjeev Sankar
- Edited by: B. Ajith
- Music by: M Jayachandran
- Distributed by: Sree Bhadra
- Release date: 2007
- Running time: 97 minutes
- Country: India
- Language: Malayalam

Paranju Theeratha Visheshangal is a Malayalam language film starring Suresh Gopi & Lakshmi Gopalaswamy in the lead roles. It was released in 2007.

== Cast ==
- Suresh Gopi as Rajeevan
- Lakshmi Gopalaswamy as Vijayalakshmi
- Janardhanan as Raghavan Nair
- Manya as Anjana Menon
- Jagathy Sreekumar as Samuel
- Sukumari as Rajeevan's mother

== Soundtrack ==
The soundtrack of the film was composed by M. Jayachandran, with lyrics penned by Yusufali Kechery and Gireesh Puthenchery. Sujatha Mohan won the Kerala Film Critics Association Award for Best Female Playback Singer for the song "Padaanum."

#	Song	Lyrics	Singers
1	"Kannante Chundil"	Yusufali Kechery	K. S. Chithra
2	"Manasse Paadu Nee"	Yusufali Kechery	B. Arundhathi
3	"Manasse Paadu Nee"	Yusufali Kechery	K. J. Yesudas
4	"Padaanum"	Gireesh Puthenchery	Sujatha Mohan
