= Yathrakarude Sradhakku =

- Directed by: Sathyan Anthikad
- Written by: Sreenivasan
- Produced by: Milan Jaleel
- Starring: Jayaram; Soundarya; Innocent
- Cinematography: Vipin Mohan
- Edited by: K. Rajagopal
- Music by: Johnson
- Release date: 20 December 2002
- Country: India
- Language: Malayalam

Yathrakarude Sradhakku (transl. Attention all passengers) is a 2002 Indian Malayalam-language comedy drama film directed by Sathyan Anthikad and written by Sreenivasan, starring Jayaram, Soundarya (in her Malayalam debut) and Innocent in pivotal roles and produce by Milan Jaleel under his banner Galaxy Films. The film depicts the relationship between Ramanujan and Jyothi, who meet on a train journey and on arriving in Chennai they disguise themselves as married couple to share the same apartment in quarters for families. The film features music composed by Johnson. The film was a commercial success at the box office.

== Plot ==
Ramanujan meets a software engineer named Jyothi on the train returning to Chennai. She has been engaged to Dr. Pradeep for many years. After they arrive in Chennai, Ramanujan asks his best friend Paul to find Jyothi a home for rent. Since Jyothi is not married, when she receives a home from Paul she lies to the owner that she is married to Ramanujan.

When she has to leave the home, because of the lie told by them, she stays at Ramanujan's house. They convince the neighbors that they are a couple. Ramanujan falls in love with Jyothi, but he understands that she is already engaged. She returns to Kerala for her marriage, and Ramanujan and Paul both attend the marriage. Paul gets drunk and tells everyone that Ramanujan and Jyothi were living in a single home together in Chennai, ending Jyothi's relationship and forcing her to marry Ramanujan.

Upon returning to Chennai, Jyothi stops talking to Ramanujan despite his best attempts to please her. When his mother meets with an accident she demands to meet Ramanujan & his new bride for one last time. Jyoti refuses to accompany Ramanujan. He returns to Kerala, one day and Paul informs her that Ramanujan's mother has died. Jyoti starts feeling guilty for not fulfilling Ramanujan's mother's last wish. And when Ramanujan goes missing post the last rites of his mother she starts worrying for him. Ramanujan brings Dr. Pradeep to Chennai, saying that Dr. Pradeep and Jyothi can start a new life together if they wish. Jyothi understands Ramanujan's real love and pardons him, choosing to continue her life with him.

== Cast ==
- Jayaram as Ramanujan
- Soundarya as Jyothi Menon (voiceover by Bhagyalakshmi)
- Innocent as Paul
- Sreenivasan as Gopinathan/Gopi
- Nedumudi Venu as Viswanathan
- Maya Menon as Lakshmi
- Oduvil Unnikrishnan as K.G. Nambiar
- T. P. Madhavan as K.K. Karthikeyan
- Siddique as Dr. Pradeep, Jyothi's Fiancée
- C. I. Paul as Sukumaran, Pradeep's Father
- V. K. Sreeraman as Isaac
- Mamukkoya as Kunjahammed
- Vettukili Prakash as Office boy
- Arun as Singer in the Song
- Shabnam as Singer in the Song

== Soundtrack ==
Yathrakarude Sradhakku

Soundtrack album by Johnson
- Genre: Film
- Language: Malayalam

The film features songs composed by Johnson and written by Kaithapram.

Song title	Singer
"Nombarakkoottile"	Madhu Balakrishnan
"Onnu Thodanullil"	P. Jayachandran
"Onnu Thodanullil" (F)	Jyotsna
"Vattayilappanthalittu"	K. S. Chithra, P. Jayachandran

== Release ==
=== Critical reception ===
The film mostly received positive reviews. Veena Pradeep of the Deccan Herald said, "A new theme, good performances, Sreenivasan's and Innocent's comic interludes and some good music keep the audience engaged throughout the film."

=== Box office ===
The film became commercial success at the box office.
