= Ormakalil Oru Manjukaalam =

- Directed by: Antony Abraham
- Written by: Antony Abraham
- Produced by: M. N. Thattoth
- Starring: Jagadish, Janardhanan,
- Edited by: Abi Chander G
- Music by: Antony Abraham
- Production company: Galary Creations
- Distributed by: Mollywood Monster
- Release date: 11 December 2015
- Country: India
- Language: Malayalam

Ormakalil Oru Manjukaalam is a 2015 musical love story. the music of Which is Composed by Antony Abraham. Ormakalil Oru Manjukaalam is produced under the banner of R T E Films by M N Thattot And distributed by Mollywood Monster

== Cast ==
- Alwin
- Deepa Jayan
- Jagadish
- Janardhanan
- Kalabhavan Navas
- Noushad Mundakkayam
- Manoj Guinness
- Indrans
- Mamukkoya
- Vysakh
- Kulappulli Leela
