= Kerala Film Critics Association Award for Best Lyricist =

Annual Indian film award

The Kerala Film Critics Association Award for Best Lyricist is given at the annual Kerala Film Critics Association Awards, honouring the best lyricist in Malayalam cinema.

== Winners ==
Year	Recipient	Film	Ref.
1977	P. Bhaskaran	Guruvayur Kesavan	
1978	Kavalam Narayana Panicker	Vadakakku Oru Hridayam	
1979	Sreekumaran Thampi	Prabhaathasandhya	
1980	Poovachal Khader	Chamaram, Lorry	
1981	Bichu Thirumala	Ahimsa, Thenum Vayambum	
1982	O. N. V. Kurup	Chillu, Olangal	
1983	O. N. V. Kurup	Koodevide, Parasparam	
1984	O. N. V. Kurup	Aalkkoottathil Thaniye	
1985	Mullanezhi	Kaiyum Thlayum Purathidaruthe	
1986	O. N. V. Kurup	Nakhakshathangal, Panchagni	
1987	O. N. V. Kurup	Manivathoorile Aayiram Sivarathrikal	
1988	Yusufali Kechery	Dhwani	
1989	K. Jayakumar	Oru Vadakkan Veeragatha, Varnam	
1990	Kaithapram Damodaran Namboothiri	Innale	
1991	Pazhavila Rameshan	Uncle Bun	
1992	Kaithapram Damodaran Namboothiri	Kudumbasametham, Kamaladalam, Savidham	
1993	Girish Puthenchery	Devaasuram, Maya Mayooram	
1994	K. Jayakumar	Pakshe	
1995	Ezhacherry Ramachandran	Kalyanji Anandji	
1996	Kaithapram Damodaran Namboothiri	Sallapam, Desadanam	
1997	S. Ramesan Nair	Aniyathipraavu, Guru	
1998	Kaithapram Damodaran Namboothiri	Agnisakshi, Ormacheppu	
1999	Yusufali Kechery	Vasanthiyum Lakshmiyum Pinne Njaanum	
2000	Prabha Varma	Nagaravadhu	
2001	O. N. V. Kurup	Meghamalhar, Pularvettam	
2002	Kaithapram Damodaran Namboothiri	Yathrakarude Sradhakku	
2003	Vayalar Sarath Chandra Varma	Mizhi Randilum	
2004	S. Ramesan Nair	Ee Snehatheerathu	
2005	M. D. Rajendran	Thaskaraveeran	
2006	Rajeev Alunkal	Kanaka Simhasanam	
2007	East Coast Vijayan	Novel	
2008	O. N. V. Kurup	Gulmohar, Thalappavu	
2009	Shibu Chakravarthy	Patham Nilayile Theevandi	
2010	Kaithapram Damodaran Namboothiri	Holidays	
2011	Rajeev Alunkal		
2012	Vayalar Sarath Chandra Varma	Ayalum Njanum Thammil	
2013	Prabha Varma, Madhu Vasudevan	Nadan	
2014	B. K. Hari Narayanan	1983, Naku Penda Naku Taka	
2015	Antony Abraham	Ormakalil Oru Manjukaalam	
2016	Vayalar Sarath Chandra Varma	Kochavva Paulo Ayyappa Coelho	
2017	M. G. Sadasivan	Ente Priyathaman	
2018	Rajeev Alunkal	Marubhoomikal, Aanakkallan	
2019	Rafeeq Ahamed	Shyamaragam	
2020	Engandiyoor Chandrasekharan	Randaam Naal	
2021	Jayakumar K. Pavithran	Ente Mazha	
2022	Vinayak Sasikumar	Ini Utharam, My Name is Azhagan, The Teacher, Keedam	

== See also ==
- Kerala Film Critics Association Award for Best Music Director
