= Venkalam =

- VCD cover
- Directed by: Bharathan
- Written by: A. K. Lohithadas
- Produced by: V. V. Babu
- Starring: Murali; Manoj K. Jayan; Urvashi
- Cinematography: Ramachandra Babu
- Edited by: B. Lenin; V. T. Vijayan
- Music by: Songs: Raveendran; Background music: Johnson; Lyrics: P. Bhaskaran
- Production company: Srishti Arts
- Release date: 1993
- Country: India
- Language: Malayalam

Venkalam is a 1993 Indian Malayalam-language film, directed by Bharathan and written by A. K. Lohithadas. It features Murali, Manoj K. Jayan and Urvashi in the lead roles. The film deals with the issue of polyandry, a prevalent tradition among the Kammalar community in Kerala.

== Cast ==
- Murali as Gopalan
- Manoj K. Jayan as Unnikrishnan
- Urvashi as Thankamani
- KPAC Lalitha as Kunjipennu
- Sonia as Sulochana
- Kuthiravattam Pappu
- Mala Aravindan as Ayyappan
- Ragini as Karthyayani
- Philomina as Grandmother
- Priyanka as Nadathara Kanakam
- Nedumudi Venu as Chathukutti
- Innocent as Kandappan
- Seena Antony as Indira
- M. S. Thripunithura as Damodaran Nampoothiri
- Salu Kuttanadu
- Niyas Backer
- Kalabhavan Navas as Singer (cameo)
- Bindu Panicker as Leela (cameo as Gopalan's ex-lover)

== Soundtrack ==
All lyrics are written by P. Bhaskaran; all music is composed by Raveendran.

No.	Title	Artist(s)	Length
1.	"Othiri Othiri"	K. J. Yesudas, Lathika
2.	"Sheeveli Mudangi"	K. J. Yesudas
3.	"Pathu Veluppinu" (Male)	Biju Narayanan
4.	"Aaraattu Kadavinkal"	K. J. Yesudas
5.	"Pathu Veluppinu" (Female)	K. S. Chithra

The male version of the song "Pathu Veluppinu" was included in the music cassettes and CDs although it was not included in the movie. This song earned its singer Biju Narayanan a place in the Malayalam music industry.
