= O. N. V. Kurup =

Indian writer

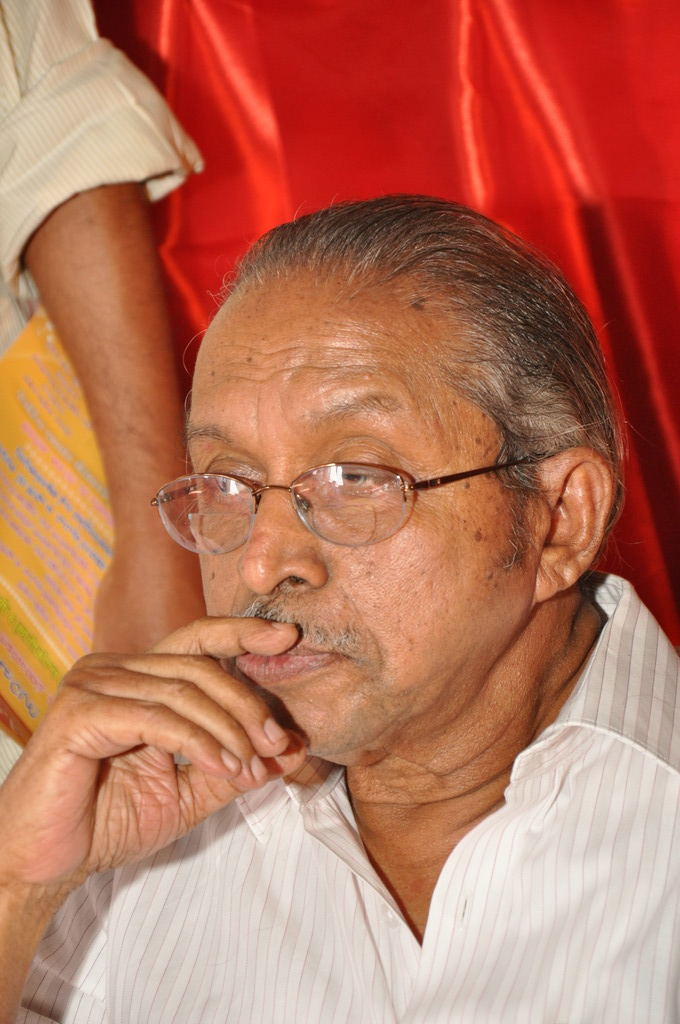
- O. N. V. Kurup
- Born: Ottaplakkal Neelakandan Velu Kurup; 27 May 1931; Chavara, Quilon, Travancore
- Died: 13 February 2016 (aged 84); Thiruvananthapuram, Kerala, India
- Education: Master's
- Alma mater: Government Higher Secondary School, Chavara; University of Travancore, Thiruvananthapuram
- Occupations: Poet, lyricist, professor
- Notable work: Agni Shalabhangal, Aksharam, Uppu, Bhoomikkoru Charamageetham, Ujjayini, Swayamvaram
- Title: Professor; Doctor (2007)
- Spouse: Sarojini
- Children: Rajeevan, Mayadevi
- Parent(s): O. N. Krishna Kurup; K. Lakshmikutty Amma
- Awards: Jnanpith Award; Padma Shri; Padma Vibhushan

Ottaplakkal Neelakandan Velu Kurup (known as O. N. V.; 27 May 1931 – 13 February 2016) was a Malayalam poet and lyricist from Kerala, India, who won the Jnanpith Award, the highest literary award in India for the year 2007. He received the awards Padma Shri in 1998 and Padma Vibhushan in 2011, the fourth and second highest civilian honours from the Government of India. In 2007 he was awarded an Honorary Doctorate by University of Kerala, Trivandrum. O. N. V. was known for his leftist leaning. He was a leader of All India Students Federation (AISF).

== Biography ==
O. N. V. Kurup was born to O. N. Krishna Kurup and K. Lakshmikutty Amma, on 27 May 1931 at Chavara, Kollam (Quilon) in Kerala. He lost his father when he was eight. His childhood days were spent in Chavara, where he attended the government school. After graduating with a bachelor's degree in economics from SN College, Kollam, he moved to Thiruvananthapuram city where he joined Travancore University (now Kerala University) and pursued Master of Arts in Malayalam literature.

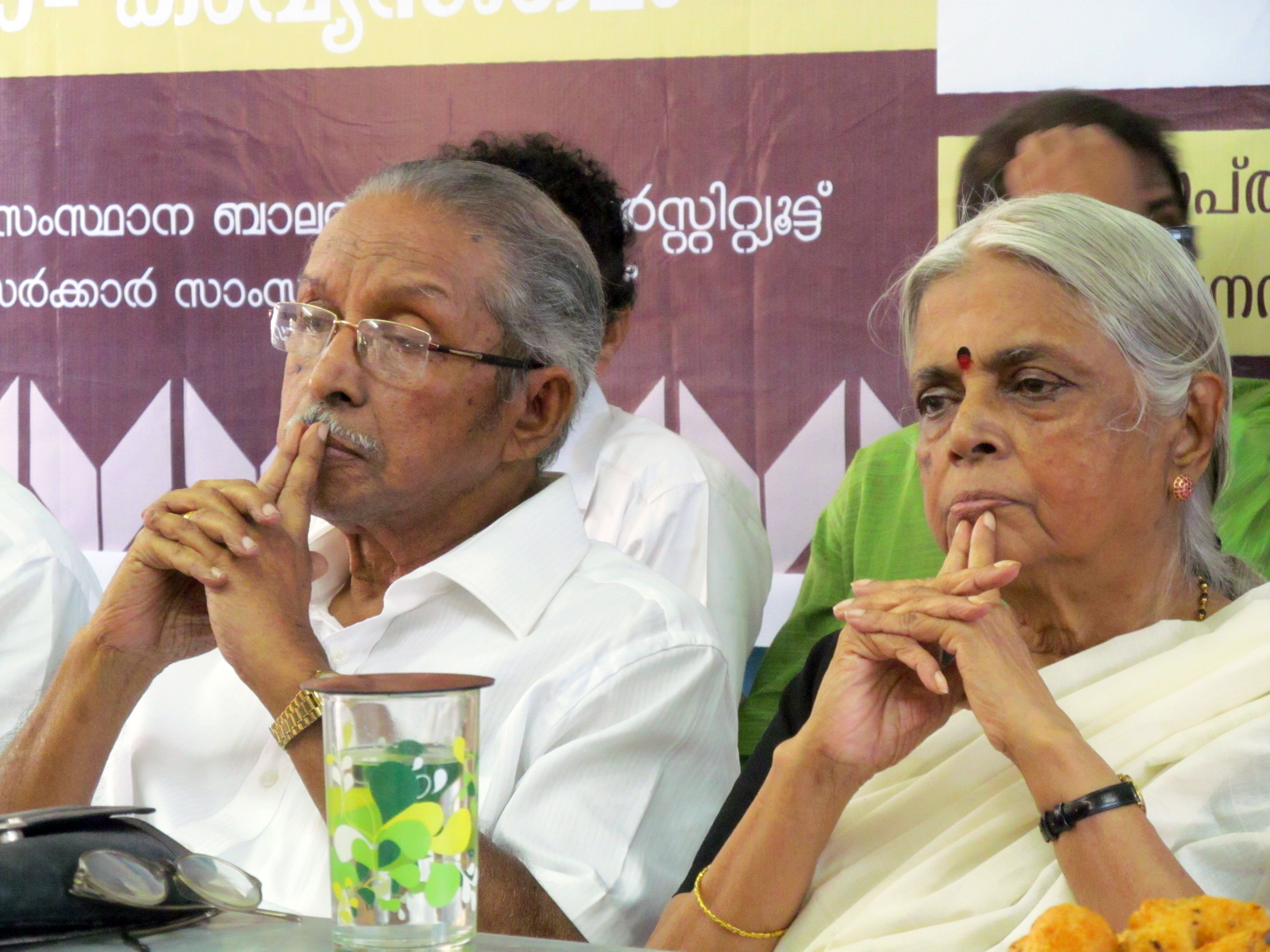
ONV Kurup and Sugathakumari at a program of the Institute of Children's Literature

Kurup was a lecturer at Maharajas College – Ernakulam, University College – Thiruvananthapuram, Arts and Science College – Kozhikode, and Brennen College – Thalassery. He joined Government Women's College – Thiruvananthapuram as the Head of Malayalam Department. He was also a visiting professor at Calicut University. He retired from service in 1986.

He received the Jnanpith Award, India's highest literary award, for the year 2007. He was the fifth Jnanpith laureate from Kerala and the second Malayalam poet to win the award. According to a statement by Bharatiya Jnanpith, the trust which presents the award, Kurup began his career as a "progressive writer and matured into a humanist though he never gave up his commitment to socialist ideology".

He settled at Vazhuthacaud in Thiruvananthapuram, with his wife Sarojini, who was also his student in his early days. O. N. V. Kurup died on 13 February 2016, due to age-related ailments at KIMS Hospital in Thiruvananthapuram. He was 84. He was cremated with full state honours at Thycaud Santhikavadam crematorium. At the time of his cremation, 84 singers represented the 84 years of his life. Led by K. J. Yesudas, they paid homage to him by singing his poems and songs.

== Poetry ==
O. N. V.'s first published poem was 'Munnottu' (Forward) which appeared in a local weekly in 1946. His first poetry collection, Porutunna Soundaryam, came out in 1949. He published a book named Daahikunna Paanapaathram (The Thirsty Chalice) which was a collection of his early poems during 1946–1956.

=== Poetic works ===
List of Poetry by Kurup
#	Name	Translation in English	Year of publishing
1	Daahikunna Paanapaathram	The Thirsty Chalice	1956
2	Marubhoomi	The Desert	
3	Neelakkannukal	Blue Eyes	
4	Mayilpeeli	Peacock Feather	1964
5	Oru Thulli Velicham	A Drop of Light	
6	Agni Shalabhangal	Fire Moths	1971
7	Aksharam	Letter	1974
8	Karutha Pakshiyude Paattu	Song of a Black Bird	1977
9	Uppu	The Salt	1980
10	Bhoomikku Oru Charama Geetham	A Requiem to the Earth	1984
11	Sharangaka Pakshikal	Indian Cuckoo Birds	1987
12	Mrigaya	Hunting	1990
13	Thonnyaksharangal	Nonsense Alphabets	1989
14	Aparahnam	Afternoon	1991
15	Ujjayini	Ujjain	1994
16	Veruthe	Gratis (For Nothing)	
17	Swayamvaram	Swayamvara (matrimony)	1995
18	Bhairavante Thudi	Drum of Bhairavan	
19	Oyenviyude Ganangal *	Songs of O.N.V.	
20	Valappottukal **	Pieces of Bangle	
21	Sooryageetham **	The Song of Sun	

*Collection of 1500 songs. **Poems for children

=== Prose list ===
List of Prose by O. N. V.
#	Name	Translation in English	Year of publishing
1	Kavithayile Samantara Rekhakal	Parallel Lines in Poetry	
2	Kavithayile Pratisandhikal	Crisis in Poetry	
3	Ezhuthachan – Oru Padanam	Ezhuthachan – A Study	
4	Patheyam	Food carried	
5	Kalpanikam	Imaginative	
6	Pushkin – Swatantrya Bodhatinte Durantagatha	Pushkin - The Tragedy of the Sense of Freedom	
7	Pokkuveyil Mannil Ezhuthiyathu	Written on The Dusty Ground (Autobiographical Writings)	

== Lyricist ==
In addition to the valuable contributions, he had given to the Malayalam literature, he was one of the leading lyricists in Malayalam film/drama/album industry. He was the part of many dramas by Kerala People's Arts Club (KPAC) which has a major remark in the revolutionary movements of Kerala. Kalam Marunnu (1956) was his first film which was also the first film by the famous Malayalam composer G. Devarajan. Since then, he has been active in film until his death and was honored with one national award and fourteen state awards (the most by a Malayalee). He has penned about 1000 songs in about 232 films and numerous songs for plays and albums. His partnerships with Salil Chowdhury and M. B. Sreenivasan were so popular in Malayalam film industry. He has made many hit songs with popular music directors, including G. Devarajan, Raveendran, V. Dakshinamoorthy, M. S. Baburaj, M. K. Arjunan, K. Raghavan, Ilaiyaraaja, Shyam, Johnson, Bombay Ravi, Mohan Sithara, M. G. Radhakrishnan, S. P. Venkatesh, Ouseppachan, Vidyadharan and M. Jayachandran.

== Awards ==
=== Civilian honours ===
- 2011 – Padma Vibhushan
- 2007 – Honorary Doctorate by University of Kerala
- 1998 – Padma Shri

=== Literary awards ===
O. N. V. has won numerous awards for his literary works.

- 2015 – Kadammanitta Ramakrishnan Award
- 2015 – Medal of Pushkin
- 2013 – P. Kesavadev Literary Award
- 2011 – Kamala Surayya Award for Dinantham
- 2011 – Thoppil Bhasi Award
- 2010 – COSINE Award
- 2009 – Ramashramam Trust Award
- 2007 – Ezhuthachan Award
- 2007 – Jnanpith Award for his overall contributions to Malayalam literature (Announced on 24 September 2010)
- 2006 – Vallathol Award
- 2003 – Bahrain Keraleeya Samajam Sahitya Award
- 2002 – P. Kunhiraman Nair Award for Ee Purathana Kinnaram
- 2002 – Deviprasadam Trust Award
- 1993 – Aasan Prize
- 1990 – Odakkuzhal Award for Mrigaya
- 1982 – Vayalar Award for Uppu
- 1979 - Pandalam Keralavarma Janmasathabdi Smaraka Award (Poetry)
- 1981 – Soviet Land Nehru Award for Uppu<
- 1975 – Kendra Sahitya Akademi Award (Malayalam) for Aksharam
- 1971 – Kerala Sahitya Akademi Award (Poetry) for Agni Salabhangal

=== Film awards ===
National Film Awards

- 1989 - Best Lyricist – Vaishali

Kerala State Film Awards

O. N. V. Kurup with singer Yesudas

ONV won the Kerala State Film Award for the Best Lyricist fourteen times:

- 2016 – Best Lyricist (Film – Kambhoji)
- 2008 – Best Lyricist (Film – Gulmohar)
- 1990 – Best Lyricist (Film – Radha Madhavam)
- 1989 – Best Lyricist (Film – Oru Sayahnathinte Swapnathil, Purappadu)
- 1988 – Best Lyricist (Film – Vaishali)
- 1987 – Best Lyricist (Film – Manivathoorile Ayiram Sivarathrikal)
- 1986 – Best Lyricist (Film – Nakhakshathangal)
- 1984 – Best Lyricist (Film – Aksharangal, Ethiripoove Chuvannapoove)
- 1983 – Best Lyricist (Film – Adaminte Variyellu)
- 1980 – Best Lyricist (Film – Yagam, Ammayum Makkalum)
- 1979 – Best Lyricist (Film – Ulkkadal)
- 1977 – Best Lyricist (Film – Madanolsavam)
- 1976 – Best Lyricist (Film – Survey Kallu)
- 1973 – Best Lyricist (Film – Swapnam)

Kerala Film Critics Association Awards

ONV won the Kerala Film Critics Association Award for the Best Lyricist seven times:

- 1982 – Best Lyricist – Chillu, Olangal
- 1983 – Best Lyricist – Koodevide, Parasparam
- 1984 – Best Lyricist – Aalkkoottathil Thaniye
- 1986 – Best Lyricist – Nakhakshathangal, Panchagni
- 1987 – Best Lyricist – Manivathoorile Aayiram Sivarathrikal
- 2001 – Best Lyricist – Meghamalhar, Pularvettam
- 2008 – Best Lyricist – Gulmohar, Thalappavu

Filmfare Awards

- 2009 – Best Lyricist Award – Pazhassi Raja
- 2011 – Best Lyricist Award – Paattil Ee Pattil – (Pranayam)

Asianet Film Awards

- 2001 – Best Lyricist Award – Meghamalhar
- 2002 – Best Lyricist Award – Ente Hridayatinte Udama

== See also ==
- O. N. V. Literary Award
