= Chillu =

- Directed by: Lenin Rajendran
- Written by: Lenin Rajendran
- Screenplay by: Lenin Rajendran
- Starring: Rony Vincent; Shanthi Krishna; Venu Nagavally; Sukumari; Jagathy Sreekumar; Adoor Bhasi; Nedumudi Venu
- Cinematography: Vipin Das
- Edited by: Ravi
- Music by: M. B. Sreenivasan
- Production company: Hayyath Movies
- Distributed by: Hayyath Movies
- Release date: 9 July 1982
- Country: India
- Language: Malayalam

Chillu (transl. Glass) is a 1982 Indian Malayalam film, directed by Lenin Rajendran. The film stars Rony Vincent, Shanthi Krishna, Venu Nagavally, Sukumari, Jagathy Sreekumar, Adoor Bhasi and Nedumudi Venu in the lead roles. The film has musical score by M. B. Sreenivasan.

== Plot ==
Annie is in love with her college mate Manu. Manu is a strange character who is a short tempered. Both get in quarrels with each other, but they soon make up. Annie is also in touch with an artist Ananthu, which disturbs Manu. Time goes by and Annie visits a doctor, causing Manu to suspect that she is pregnant. An upset Manu part ways with Annie and decides to marry Lali, another girl. Annie also attends the wedding and cries after the wedding. On the first night, Manu realises his mistake and goes to visit Annie.

== Cast ==
- Rony Vincent as Manu George
- Shanthi Krishna as Annie
- Venu Nagavally as Ananthu
- Sukumari
- Jagathy Sreekumar as James
- Adoor Bhasi
- Nedumudi Venu as Josukutty
- Jalaja as Ananthu's lover
- Kanakalatha as servant
- Anitha

== Soundtrack ==
The music was composed by M. B. Sreenivasan and the lyrics was written by O. N. V. Kurup, Kavalam Narayana Panicker and Edasseri.

No.	Song	Singers	Lyrics	Length (m:ss)
1	"Chaithram Chaayam Chaalichu"	K. J. Yesudas	O. N. V. Kurup	
2	"Mannu"	Venu Nagavally	Kavalam Narayana Panicker	
3	"Oru Vattam Koodiyen"	K. J. Yesudas	O. N. V. Kurup	
4	"Oru Vattam Koodiyen"	S. Janaki	O. N. V. Kurup	
5	"Pokkuveyil Ponnuruki"	K. J. Yesudas	O. N. V. Kurup	
6	"Poothappaattu"	Balachandran Chullikkad	Edasseri	
