= Kerala Film Critics Association Award for Best Music Director =

Annual Indian film award

The Kerala Film Critics Association Award for Best Music Director is given annually at the Kerala Film Critics Association Awards, honouring the best music direction in a Malayalam film released in the previous year.

== Superlatives ==
Wins	Recipient(s)
8	M. Jayachandran
5	Johnson
4	Raveendran
3	G. Devarajan; Vidyasagar
2	Ouseppachan

== Winners ==
Year	Recipient	Film	Ref.
1977	G. Devarajan	Guruvayur Kesavan	
1978	G. Devarajan	Various films	
1979	G. Devarajan	Iniyethra Sandhyakal	
1980	Jerry Amaldev	Manjil Virinja Pookkal	
1981	Shyam	Thrishna	
1982	M. B. Sreenivasan	Chillu	
1983	Johnson	Koodevide	
1984	Raveendran	Aduthaduthu, Ithiri Poove Chuvannapoove	
1985	A. J. Joseph	Ente Kaanakkuyil	
1986	Ravi Bombay	Nakhakshathangal, Panchagni	
1987	Ouseppachan	Kakkothikkavile Appooppan Thaadikal	
1988	Johnson	Isabella, Ponmuttayidunna Tharavu	
1989	Mohan Sithara	Mudra, Chanakyan	
1990	Perumbavoor G. Raveendranath	Innale	
1991	Raveendran	Bharatham	
1992	Johnson	Savidham, Kudumbasammetham	
1993	M. G. Radhakrishnan	Devaasuram, Manichitrathazhu	
1994	Sharreth	Pavithram	
1995	Raveendran	Mazhayethum Munpe	
1996	Johnson	Sallapam, Ee Puzhayum Kadannu	
1997	Kaithapram Damodaran Namboothiri	Ennu Swantham Janakikutty, Kaliyattam	
1998	Vidyasagar	Pranayavarnangal	
1999	Vidyasagar	Chandranudikkunna Dikkil, Niram	
2000	Raveendran	Mazha	
2001	Ramesh Narayan	Meghamalhar	
2002	Vidyasagar	Meesa Madhavan	
2003	M. Jayachandran	Gaurisankaram, Balettan, Kanninum Kannadikkum	
2004	Alphons Joseph	Jalolsavam	
2005	M. Jayachandran	Nottam, Paranju Theeratha Visheshangal	
2006	Alex Paul	Classmates	
2007	M. Jayachandran	Nivedyam	
2008	Johnson	Gulmohar	
2009	Srinivas	Seetha Kalyanam	
2010	M. Jayachandran	Karayilekku Oru Kadal Dooram	
2011	M. G. Sreekumar	Oru Marubhoomikkadha	
2012	M. Jayachandran	Celluloid	
2013	Ratheesh Vega	Orissa	
2014	Gopi Sundar	1983, Naku Penda Naku Taka	
2015	M. Jayachandran	Ennu Ninte Moideen, Nirnayakam	
2016	M. Jayachandran	Kambhoji	
2017	4 Musics	Meezan, Sadrishavakyam 24: 29	
2018	Kailas Menon	Theevandi	
2019	Ouseppachan	Evidey	
2020	M. Jayachandran	Sufiyum Sujatayum	
2021	Hesham Abdul Wahab	Hridayam, Madhuram	
2022	Kavalam Sreekumar	Headmaster	

== See also ==
- Kerala Film Critics Association Award for Best Female Playback Singer
- Kerala Film Critics Association Award for Best Male Playback Singer
