= Kerala Film Critics Association Award for Second Best Film =

Annual Indian film award

The Kerala Film Critics Association Award for Second Best Film is presented annually at the Kerala Film Critics Association Awards of India to the second best film in Malayalam cinema.

== Winners ==
Year	Film	Director	Ref.
1983	Kattathe Kilikkoodu	Bharathan	
1984	Ithiri Poove Chuvannapoove	Bharathan	
1985	Irakal	K. G. George	
1986	Panchagni	Hariharan	
1986	Namukku Parkkan Munthirithoppukal	P. Padmarajan	
1987	Mattoral	K. G. George	
1988	1921	I. V. Sasi	
1988	Isabella	Mohan	
1988	Oru Vadakkan Veeragatha	Hariharan	
1988	Vachanam	Lenin Rajendran	
1990	Amaram	Bharathan	
1991	Yamanam	Bharat Gopy	
1991	Santhwanam	Sibi Malayil	
1992	Daivathinte Vikrithikal	Lenin Rajendran	
1993	Sopanam	Jayaraj	
1993	Maya Mayooram	Sibi Malayil	
1994	Samudhayam	Ambili	
1995	Mazhayethum Munpe	Kamal	
1996	Ee Puzhayum Kadannu	Kamal	
1996	Thooval Kottaram	Sathyan Anthikad	
1997	Bhoothakkannadi	Lohithadas	
1998	Ormacheppu	Lohithadas	
1998	Janani	Rajeevnath	
1999	Veendum Chila Veettukaryangal	Sathyan Anthikad	
1999	Niram	Kamal	
2000	Mazha	Lenin Rajendran	
2001	Kannaki	Jayaraj	
2002	Nammal	Kamal	
2002	Yathrakarude Sradhakku	Sathyan Anthikad	
2003	Kasthooriman	Lohithadas	
2003	Mizhi Randilum	Ranjith	
2004	Akale	Shyamaprasad	
2005	Thanmathra	Blessy	
2005	Paranju Theeratha Visheshangal	Harikumar	
2006	Rathri Mazha	Lenin Rajendran	
2006	Kaiyoppu	Ranjith	
2006	Anandabhairavi	Jayaraj	
2007	Nivedyam	Lohithadas	
2008	Kurukshetra	Major Ravi	
2009	Paleri Manikyam: Oru Pathirakolapathakathinte Katha	Ranjith	
2010	Makaramanju	Lenin Rajendran	
2011	Urumi	Santosh Sivan	
2012	Ozhimuri	Madhupal	
2013	Ayaal	Suresh Unnithan	
2014	Ottamandaram	Vinod Mankara	
2015	Kaattum Mazhayum	Harikumar	
2016	Jacobinte Swargarajyam	Vineeth Sreenivasan	
2017	Aalorukkam	V. C. Abhilash	
2018	Joseph	M. Padmakumar	
2019	Vasanthi	Rahman Brothers	
2020	Vellam	Prajesh Sen	
2021	Minnal Murali	Basil Joseph	
2022	Vettapattikalum Ottakarum	G. Rarish	

== See also ==
- Kerala Film Critics Association Award for Best Film
