= Kerala Film Critics Association Award for Best Female Playback Singer =

Annual Indian film award

The Kerala Film Critics Association Award for Best Female Playback Singer is one of the annual awards given at the Kerala Film Critics Association Awards, honouring the best female playback singer in Malayalam cinema in the previous year.

== Superlatives ==
Wins	Image	Recipient(s)	Years
15		Sujatha Mohan	1988-1993, 1995-1999, 2001, 2003-2005
7		K. S. Chithra	1984-1987, 1994, 2015, 2020
4		S. Janaki	1978, 1981-1983
3		Jyotsna	2009, 2013, 2017
3		Manjari	2006, 2011, 2019
2		P. Madhuri	1977, 1979
2		Vaikom Vijayalakshmi	2012, 2024
2		Aparna Rajeev	2008, 2021

== Winners ==
Year	Recipient	Film	Ref.
1977	P. Madhuri	Various films	
1978	S. Janaki	Various films	
1979	P. Madhuri	Iniyethra Sandhyakal	
1980	Vani Jairam	Various films	
1981	S. Janaki	Thrishna	
1982	S. Janaki	Chillu, Olangal	
1983	S. Janaki	Koodevide	
1984	K. S. Chithra	Nokkethadhoorathu Kannum Nattu	
1985	K. S. Chithra	Various films	
1986	K. S. Chithra	Shyama, Thalavattam, Nakhakshathangal	
1987	K. S. Chithra	Idanazhiyil Oru Kaalocha, Manivathoorile Aayiram Sivarathrikal	
1988	Sujatha Mohan	Chithram	
1989	Sujatha Mohan	Vandanam	
1990	Sujatha Mohan	Malootty	
1991	Sujatha Mohan	Kizhakkunarum Pakshi, Kankettu	
1992	Sujatha Mohan	Ulsavamelam	
1993	Sujatha Mohan	Meleparambil Anveedu, Dhruvam, Chenkol	
1994	K. S. Chithra	—	
1995	Sujatha Mohan	—	
1996	Sujatha Mohan	Azhakiya Ravanan, Desadanam, Ee Puzhayum Kadannu	
1997	Sujatha Mohan	—	
1998	Sujatha Mohan	Pranayavarnangal, Janani	
1999	Sujatha Mohan	Chandranudikkunna Dikkil, Saaphalyam	
2000	Asha G. Menon	Mazha	
2001	Sujatha Mohan	Soothradharan, Pularvettam	
2002	Radhika Thilak	Kunjikoonan	
2003	Sujatha Mohan	Kasthooriman, Vellithira	
2004	Sujatha Mohan	—	
2005	Sujatha Mohan	Paranju Theeratha Visheshangal	
2006	Manjari	Rasathanthram	
2007	Swetha Mohan	Nivedyam, Ore Kadal	
2008	Aparna Rajeev	Mizhikal Sakshi	
2009	Jyotsna Radhakrishnan	Nayanam	
2010	Shreya Ghoshal	Aagathan	
2011	Manjari	—	
2012	Vaikom Vijayalakshmi	Celluloid	
2013	Jyotsna Radhakrishnan	Zachariayude Garbhinikal	
2014	Madhushree Narayan	Ottamandaram	
2015	K. S. Chithra	Ormakalil Oru Manjukaalam	
2016	Varsha Vinu	Marupadi ("Melle Vannupoyi")	
2017	Jyotsna Radhakrishnan	Kaattu	
2018	Resmi Sateesh	Ee Mazhanilavil ("Ee Yathra")	
2019	Manjari	March Randam Vyazham ("Tharapatham Paadum")	
2020	K. S. Chithra	Perfume ("Neelavanam")	
2021	Aparna Rajeev	Thuruthu ("Thira Thodum")	
2022	Nithya Mammen	Headmaster ("Aayiraththiri")	
2023	Mridula Warrier	Kirkkan ("Kalame")	
2024	Vaikom Vijayalakshmi	A.R.M (Angu Vaana Konilu)	
2024	Devananda Girish	Naattinidayana	

== See also ==
- Kerala Film Critics Association Award for Best Male Playback Singer
- Kerala Film Critics Association Award for Best Music Director
