= Kerala Film Critics Association Award for Best Cinematographer =

Annual Indian film award

The Kerala Film Critics Association Award for Best Cinematographer is an annual honor presented at the Kerala Film Critics Association Awards, to recognise excellence in cinematography within Malayalam cinema.

== Winners ==
Year	Recipient	Film	Ref.
1977	U. Rajagopal	Yuddha Kandam	
1978	Shaji N. Karun	Thampu	
1979	Balu Mahendra	Oolkatal	
1980	Ashok Kumar	Manjil Virinja Pookkal	
1981	Ramachandra Babu	Parvathi, Nidra	
1982	Balu Mahendra	Olangal	
1983	Shaji N. Karun	Manju, Koodevide	
1984	Melli Irani	Vellam	
1985	Venu	—	
1986	Shaji N. Karun	Meenamasathile Sooryan, Onnu Muthal Poojyam Vare	
1987	Madhu Ambat	Purushartham, Swathi Thirunal	
1988	Sunny Joseph	Piravi	
1989	Mankada Ravi Varma	Mathilukal	
1990	Santosh Sivan	Perumthachan	
1991	Anandakuttan	Bharatham	
1992	Madhu Ambat	Daivathinte Vikrithikal	
1993	S. Kumar	Paithrukam	
1994	Saloo George	Kashmeeram	
1995	Mankada Ravi Varma	Kathapurushan	
1996	M. J. Radhakrishnan	Desadanam	
1997	S. Kumar	Guru	
1998	Alagappan	Agnisakshi	
1999	Ravi K. Chandran	Punaradhivasam	
2000	K. G. Jayan	Susanna, Kattu Vannu Vilichappol	
2001	M. J. Radhakrishnan	Kannaki, Theerthadanam	
2002	Alagappan	Nandanam	
2003	Tirru	Mullavalliyum Thenmavum	
2004	S. Kumar	Akale	
2005	Santosh Sivan	Anandabhadram	
2006	P. Sukumar	Karutha Pakshikal	
2007	Alagappan	Ore Kadal	
2008	M. J. Radhakrishnan	Thirakkatha	
2009	Ramachandra Babu	Kadaksham	
2010	Madhu Ambat	Adaminte Makan Abu, Gramam	
2011	Santosh Sivan	Urumi	
2012	Arun Kumar Aravind	Ee Adutha Kaalathu	
2013	Udayan Ambaadi	English: An Autumn in London	
2014	Amal Neerad	Iyobinte Pusthakam	
2015	Jomon T. John	Neena, Ennu Ninte Moideen	
2016	Sujith Vaassudev	James & Alice	
2017	Nikhil S. Praveen	Bhayanakam	
2018	Sabu James	Marubhoomikal, Sidharthan Enna Njan	
2019	Girish Gangadharan	Jallikattu	
2020	Amal Neerad	Trance	
2021	Aslam K. Purayil	Salute	
2022	Abraham Joseph	Kumari	
