= Kerala Film Critics Association Awards =

Film award of film critics from Kerala, India

- Awarded for: Best in film
- Country: India
- Presented by: Kerala Film Critics Association
- First award: 1977
- Website: keralafilmcritics.com

The Kerala Film Critics Association Awards are presented annually by the Kerala Film Critics Association to honour both artistic and technical excellence of professionals in the Malayalam language film industry of India. The awards were instituted in 1977.

== History ==
The Kerala Film Critics Association is an organisation of film critics from Kerala, India. It presents the Kerala Film Critics Association Awards each year to honour the finest achievements in e Malayalam cinema.

== Juries and rules ==
The awards are given in several categories. In addition to regular categories, the association occasionally has special awards. The awards include a cash award of Rs. 1 lakh for the best film. The second best film, best director, best actor and best actress will receive Rs. 25,000 each.

== Ceremonies ==
The following is a listing of all Kerala Film Critics Association Awards ceremonies since 2002.

Ceremony	Date	Best Film	Ref
26th Kerala Film Critics Association Awards	27 January 2003	Nammal; Nandanam	
34th Kerala Film Critics Association Awards	26 February 2011	Khaddama	
35th Kerala Film Critics Association Awards	18 May 2012	Pranayam	
37th Kerala Film Critics Association Awards	30 January 2014	Drishyam	
38th Kerala Film Critics Association Awards	15 April 2015	Ottaal; Iyobinte Pusthakam	
39th Kerala Film Critics Association Awards	28 May 2016	Ennu Ninte Moideen	
40th Kerala Film Critics Association Awards	7 March 2017	Oppam	
41st Kerala Film Critics Association Awards	20 April 2018	Thondimuthalum Driksakshiyum	
42nd Kerala Film Critics Association Awards	9 April 2019	Oru Kuprasidha Payyan	
43rd Kerala Film Critics Association Awards	20 October 2020	Jallikattu	
44th Kerala Film Critics Association Awards	13 September 2021	The Great Indian Kitchen	
45th Kerala Film Critics Association Awards	19 October 2022	Aavasavyuham	
46th Kerala Film Critics Association Awards	23 May 2023	Headmaster; B 32 Muthal 44 Vare	
47th Kerala Film Critics Association Awards	12 May 2024	Aattam	
48th Kerala Film Critics Association Awards	15 May 2025	Feminichi Fathima	
49th Kerala Film Critics Association Awards	2 October 2026	Eko	

== Categories ==
=== Main awards ===
- Kerala Film Critics Association Award for Best Film
- Kerala Film Critics Association Award for Best Director
- Kerala Film Critics Association Award for Best Actor
- Kerala Film Critics Association Award for Best Actress
- Kerala Film Critics Association Award for Second Best Film
- Kerala Film Critics Association Award for Best Supporting Actor
- Kerala Film Critics Association Award for Best Supporting Actress
- Kerala Film Critics Association Award for Best Popular Film
- Kerala Film Critics Association Award for Best Debut Actor
- Kerala Film Critics Association Award for Best Debut Actress
- Kerala Film Critics Association Award for Best Actor in Negative Role
- Kerala Film Critics Association Award for Best Actress in Negative Role
- Kerala Film Critics Association Award for Best Screenplay
- Kerala Film Critics Association Award for Best Story
- Kerala Film Critics Association Award for Best Cinematographer
- Kerala Film Critics Association Award for Best Debut Director
- Kerala Film Critics Association Award for Best Art Director
- Kerala Film Critics Association Award for Best Editor
- Kerala Film Critics Association Award for Best Sound Recording
- Kerala Film Critics Association Award for Best Costume Design
- Kerala Film Critics Association Award for Best Music Director
- Kerala Film Critics Association Award for Best Female Playback Singer
- Kerala Film Critics Association Award for Best Male Playback Singer
- Kerala Film Critics Association Award for Best Lyricist
- Kerala Film Critics Association Award for Best Choreographer
- Kerala Film Critics Association Award for Best Make-up Artist
- Kerala Film Critics Association Award for Best Child Artist
- Kerala Film Critics Association Award for Best Children's Film
- Kerala Film Critics Association Award for Special Jury Award

=== Honorary awards ===
- Chalachitra Ratnam Award
- Chalachitra Prathibha Award
- Ruby Jubilee Award
