= Kerala Film Critics Association Award for Best Director =

Annual Indian film award

The Kerala Film Critics Association Award for Best Director is presented annually at the Kerala Film Critics Association Awards of India to the best director in Malayalam cinema.

== Superlatives ==
Wins	Recipient(s)
4	Adoor Gopalakrishnan; Kamal
3	Bharathan; Jayaraj
2	Hariharan; K. G. George; Lenin Rajendran; Mohan; Shaji N. Karun; Shyamaprasad; T. V. Chandran

== Winners ==
Year	Recipient	Film	Ref.
1977	P. Bhaskaran	Jagadguru Aadisankaran	
1978	G. Aravindan	Thampu	
1979	Bharathan	Thakara	
1980	Mohan	Shalini Ente Koottukari	
1981	Mohan	Vida Parayum Munpe	
1982	K. G. George	Yavanika	
1983	P. Padmarajan	Koodevide	
1984	—	—	
1985	K. G. George	Irakal	
1986	Lenin Rajendran	Meenamasathile Sooryan	
1987	Adoor Gopalakrishnan	Anantaram	
1988	I. V. Sasi	1921	
1989	Adoor Gopalakrishnan	Mathilukal	
1990	Bharathan	Amaram	
1991	Sibi Malayil	Bharatham	
1992	Bharathan	Venkalam	
1993	Adoor Gopalakrishnan	Vidheyan	
1994	Harikumar	Sukrutham	
1995	Adoor Gopalakrishnan	Kathapurushan	
1996	Jayaraj	Desadanam	
1997	Hariharan	Ennu Swantham Janakikutty	
1998	Shyamaprasad	Agnisakshi	
1999	Shaji N. Karun	Vanaprastham	
2000	T. V. Chandran	Susanna	
2000	Lenin Rajendran	Mazha	
2001	—	—	
2002	Ranjith	Nandanam	
2003	T. V. Chandran	Padam Onnu Oru Vilapam	
2004	Kamal	Perumazhakkalam	
2005	Santosh Sivan	Anandabhadram	
2006	Kamal	Karutha Pakshikal	
2007	Shyamaprasad	Ore Kadal	
2008	Madhupal	Thalappavu	
2009	Hariharan	Kerala Varma Pazhassi Raja	
2009	Rosshan Andrrews	Evidam Swargamanu	
2010	Kamal	Khaddama	
2011	Blessy	Pranayam	
2012	Kamal	Celluloid	
2013	Jeethu Joseph	Drishyam	
2014	Jayaraj	Ottaal	
2015	R. S. Vimal	Ennu Ninte Moideen	
2016	Priyadarshan	Oppam	
2017	Jayaraj	Bhayanakam	
2018	Shaji N. Karun	Oolu	
2019	Geetu Mohandas	Moothon	
2020	Sidhartha Siva	Ennivar	
2021	Martin Prakkat	Nayattu	
2022	Mahesh Narayanan	Ariyippu	

== See also ==
- Kerala Film Critics Association Award for Best Film
