= Kerala Film Critics Association Award for Best Actor =

Annual Indian film award

The Kerala Film Critics Association Award for Best Actor is presented annually at the Kerala Film Critics Association Awards, honouring the best performances by male actors in Malayalam films released in the previous year.

== Superlatives ==
Wins	Recipient(s)
9	Mohanlal
8	Mammootty
3	Dileep; Prithviraj; Suresh Gopi
2	Bharat Gopy; Biju Menon; Jayaram; Madhu; Manoj K. Jayan; Thilakan

== Winners ==
Year	Recipient	Film	Ref.
1977	Madhu	Yuddha Kandam, Itha Ivide Vare	
1978	Sukumaran	Bandhanam, Randu Penkuttikal	
1979	Madhu	Idavazhiyile Poocha Minda Poocha	
1980	Achankunju	Lorry	
1981	Nedumudi Venu	Vida Parayum Munpe	
1982	Bharat Gopy	Yavanika, Ormakkayi	
1983	Bharat Gopy	Kattathe Kilikkoodu, Rachana	
1984	Mammootty	Aksharangal, Kaanamarayathu	
1985	Mammootty	Anubandham, Nirakkoottu, Kochu Themmadi	
1986	Thilakan	Panchagni, Namukku Parkkan Munthirithoppukal	
1987	Mammootty	Thaniyavarthanam, New Delhi	
1988	Mohanlal	Chithram, Padamudra	
1989	Mammootty	Mathilukal, Oru Vadakkan Veeragatha, Mrugaya	
1990	Thilakan	Perumthachan, Kattukuthira	
1991	Mohanlal	Bharatham, Ulladakkam	
1992	Mammootty	Soorya Manasam, Aayirappara, Pappayude Swantham Appoos	
1993	Suresh Gopi	Ekalavyan, Manichitrathazhu, Ponnuchami	
1994	Mammootty	Sukrutham	
1995	Suresh Gopi	Saadaram, Sindoora Rekha, Sakshyam	
1996	Jayaram	Kaliveedu, Thooval Kottaram	
1997	Suresh Gopi	Kaliyattam	
1998	Murali	Thalolam, Kallu Kondoru Pennu	
1999	Mohanlal	Vanaprastham	
2000	Biju Menon	Madhuranombarakattu, Mazha	
2001	Jayaram	Sesham	
2002	Dileep	Kunjikoonan	
2003	Prithviraj	Meerayude Dukhavum Muthuvinte Swapnavum	
2004	Dileep	Kathavasheshan	
2005	Manoj K. Jayan	Anandabhadram	
2005	Dileep	Chanthupottu	
2006	Mammootty	Karutha Pakshikal, Kaiyoppu	
2007	Mohanlal	Paradesi	
2008	Mohanlal	Kurukshetra, Pakal Nakshatrangal	
2009	Innocent	Patham Nilayile Theevandi	
2010	Mammootty	Pranchiyettan & the Saint	
2011	Mohanlal	Pranayam	
2012	Lal	Ozhimuri	
2013	Mohanlal	Drishyam	
2014	Manoj K. Jayan	Negalukal, Kukkiliyar	
2015	Prithviraj	Ennu Ninte Moideen	
2016	Mohanlal	Oppam	
2017	Fahadh Faasil	Thondimuthalum Driksakshiyum	
2018	Mohanlal	Odiyan	
2019	Nivin Pauly	Moothon	
2020	Prithviraj	Ayyappanum Koshiyum	
2020	Biju Menon	Ayyappanum Koshiyum	
2021	Dulquer Salmaan	Kurup, Salute	
2022	Kunchacko Boban	Nna Thaan Case Kodu	

== See also ==
- Kerala Film Critics Association Award for Best Actress
