= Chalachitra Ratnam Award =

Indian film award

The Chalachitra Ratnam Award is an annual award given at the Kerala Film Critics Association Awards since 1993 for lifetime achievement in Malayalam cinema.

== Winners ==
Year	Recipient	Ref.
1993	Thikkurissy Sukumaran Nair	
1994	Madhu	
1995	P. Bhaskaran	
1996	Aranmula Ponnamma	
1997	Navodaya Appachan	
1998	K. J. Yesudas	
1999	K. Ravindranathan Nair	
2000	Sukumari	
2001	Balachandra Menon	
2002	Bharat Gopy	
2003	Mohanlal	
2004	Mammootty	
2005	Thilakan	
2006	Adoor Gopalakrishnan	
2006	P. V. Gangadharan	
2007	T. E. Vasudevan	
2008	—	
2009	Jagathy Sreekumar	
2010	K. S. Sethumadhavan	
2011	O. N. V. Kurup	
2012	Nedumudi Venu	
2013	K. R. Vijaya	
2014	K. G. George	
2015	Innocent	
2016	Sreekumaran Thampi	
2017	M. K. Arjunan	
2018	Sheela	
2019	Hariharan	
2020	K. G. George	
2021	Joshiy	
2022	K. P. Kumaran	
2023	Sreenivasan	
2024	Vijayakrishnan	

== See also ==
- Chalachitra Prathibha Award
- Ruby Jubilee Award
