= Chalachitra Prathibha Award =

Indian film award

The Chalachitra Prathibha Award has been given at the Kerala Film Critics Association Awards, every year since 1986 for overall contribution to Malayalam cinema.

== Winners ==
Year	Recipients	Ref.
1986	Thikkurissy Sukumaran Nair, M. Krishnan Nair, Kottarakkara Sreedharan Nair, P. Bhaskaran, T. S. Muthaiah, K. Raghavan, Jose Prakash, A. M. Rajah, Vaikom Mani, Kamukara Purushothaman, Vanchiyoor Madhavan Nair, Nagavally R. S. Kurup, Aranmula Ponnamma, P. Leela, Padmini, K. P. Udayabhanu, Santha P. Nair, Krishna Elamon, T. E. Vasudevan, K. Aniyan	
1987	Alleppey Vincent, R. N. Pillai, V. Dakshinamoorthy, Kozhikode Santha Devi, Jagathy N. K. Achary, C. S. Radhadevi, K. Gopinath	
1988	Devaki Bhai, T. N. Gopinathan Nair, P. A. Thomas	
1989	Ponkunnam Varkey, Abhayadev, Kalaikkal Kumaran, Adoor Pankajam, C. O. Anto	
1990	Pankajavalli, P. K. Sarangapani, Kaviyoor Revamma, T. K. Balachandran, A. Vincent, J. D. Thottan	
1991	K. T. Muhammed, E. N. C. Nair, Prem Nawas, Crossbelt Mani, Sreelatha	
1992	Neyyattinkara Komalam, G. Vivekanandan, G. K. Pillai, K. P. Kottarakkara, U. Rajagopal	
1993	P. Ramdas, V. Karunakaran, R.S. Prabhu, Adoor Bhavani	
1994	—	
1995	K. S. Sethumadhavan, K. G. Jayan, Sobhana Parameswaran Nair, M. O. Devasiya, T. R. Omana	
1996	Sankaradi, M. K. Arjunan, Kanmani Babu, Anandavally, P. N. Menon	
1997	Paravoor Bharathan, Pappanamkodu Lakshmanan, E. N. Balakrishnan, Philomina, P. I. A. Kasim	
1998	Vipindas, N. G. John, K. P. Brahmanandan, A. Raghunath	
1999	Pala Thankam, T. N. Krishnankutty Nair, Kaduvakkulam Antony, P. T. Xavier, Dr. Balakrishnan	
2000	B. A. Chidambaranath, C. Ramachandra Menon, P. G. Viswambharan, Mankombu Gopalakrishnan, Khadeeja	
2001	K. P. A. C. Sunny, S. Janaki, Sreekumaran Thampi	
2002	John Sankaramangalam, Kuttyedathi Vilasini, Bharanikkavu Sivakumar, Pappukutty Bhagavathar	
2003	T. P. Madhavan, Latha Raju, Pukazhenthi, K. S. Gopalakrishnan, Hari	
2004	Poovachal Khader, M. G. Radhakrishnan, Vidhubala, M. Ramachandran, Chandramohan	
2005	Srividya, K. G. Markose, Venu, Sankaran Kutty, Sivan	
2006	M. M. Nesan, Guru Gopalakrishnan, L. R. Eswari	
2007	P. K. Nair, Valsala Menon, K. P. Thomas	
2008	E. K. Thyagarajan, Major Stanley, Machad Vasanthi	
2009	Raghavan, Venu Nagavally, Sujatha Mohan	
2010	Jagannatha Varma, Bichu Thirumala, Santhakumari	
2011	Janardhanan, N. L. Balakrishnan, Thodupuzha Vasanthi	
2012	Jerry Amaldev, Poojappura Ravi, Jayabharathi	
2013	T. G. Ravi, Mala Aravindan, A. J. Joseph	
2014	Nilambur Ayisha, Bhagyalakshmi, Perumbavoor G. Raveendranath	
2015	Kaviyoor Sivaprasad, Bichu Thirumala, Mallika Sukumaran	
2016	Fazil, Ramachandra Babu, Shanthi Krishna	
2017	Balu Kiriyath, Devan, Jalaja	
2018	Kaithapram Damodaran, P. Sreekumar, Lalu Alex, Menaka, Bhagyalakshmi	
2019	S. Kumar, Nemam Pushparaj, Sethulakshmi, Kollam Mohan	
2020	Mamukkoya, Sai Kumar, Bindu Panicker	
2021	Revathi, Urvashi, Babu Namboothiri, Kochu Preman	
2022	Shobana, Vijayaraghavan, Vineeth, Gayathri Ashokan, Mohan D. Kurichy	
2023	Mukesh, Prem Kumar, Suhasini, Beena Paul, Kireedam Unni	
2024	Seema, Babu Antony, Vipin Mohan, Jubilee Joy Thomas, Thyagarajan	

== See also ==
- Chalachitra Ratnam Award
- Ruby Jubilee Award
