= Kerala Film Critics Association Award for Best Actress =

Annual Indian film award

The Kerala Film Critics Association Award for Best Actress is presented annually at the Kerala Film Critics Association Awards, honouring the best performances by female actors in Malayalam films.

== Superlatives ==
| Wins | Recipient(s) |
|---|---|
| 3 | Kavya Madhavan; Manju Warrier |
| 2 | Geetu Mohandas; Jayabharathi; Seema; Shobana; Sumalatha; Urvashi |

== Winners ==
| Year | Recipient | Film | Ref. |
|---|---|---|---|
| 1977 | Jayabharathi | Yuddha Kandam, Itha Ivide Vare | |
| 1978 | Jayabharathi | Asthamayam | |
| 1979 | Srividya | Idavazhiyile Poocha Minda Poocha | |
| 1980 | Seema | Kaantha Valayam | |
| 1981 | Jalaja | Venal | |
| 1982 | Madhavi | Ormakkayi, Novemberinte Nashtam | |
| 1983 | Suhasini | Koodevide | |
| 1984 | Nadia Moidu | Nokkethadhoorathu Kannum Nattu | |
| 1985 | Seema | Anubandham | |
| 1986 | Geetha | Panchagni | |
| 1987 | Sumalatha | New Delhi, Thoovanathumbikal | |
| 1988 | Sumalatha | Isabella | |
| 1989 | Rekha | Dasharatham | |
| 1990 | Urvashi | Thalayana Manthram, Thoovalsparsham | |
| 1991 | Urvashi | Mukha Chithram, Kakkathollayiram | |
| 1992 | K. P. A. C. Lalitha | Venkalam, Mukhamudra | |
| 1993 | Shobana | Manichitrathazhu, Meleparambil Anveedu | |
| 1994 | Shanthi Krishna | Chakoram | |
| 1995 | Vani Viswanath | The King, Mannar Mathai Speaking, Mangalam Veettil Manaseswari Gupta | |
| 1996 | Manju Warrier | Sallapam, Ee Puzhayum Kadannu, Thooval Kottaram | |
| 1997 | Jomol | Ennu Swantham Janakikutty | |
| 1998 | Shobana | Agnisakshi | |
| 1999 | Praveena | Vasanthiyum Lakshmiyum Pinne Njaanum | |
| 2000 | Samyuktha Varma | Madhuranombarakattu, Mazha | |
| 2001 | Geetu Mohandas | Sesham | |
| 2002 | Navya Nair | Nandanam, Kunjikoonan | |
| 2003 | Meera Jasmine | Paadam Onnu: Oru Vilapam, Kasthooriman, Gramophone | |
| 2004 | Kavya Madhavan | Perumazhakkalam, Annorikkal | |
| 2004 | Geetu Mohandas | Akale, Oridam | |
| 2005 | Kavya Madhavan | Anandabhadram, Seelabathi | |
| 2006 | Padmapriya | Karutha Pakshikal, Yes Your Honour | |
| 2007 | Lakshmi Gopalaswamy | Thaniye, Paradesi | |
| 2008 | Sukumari | Mizhikal Sakshi | |
| 2009 | Kaniha | Bhagyadevatha | |
| 2010 | Kavya Madhavan | Khaddama | |
| 2011 | Rima Kallingal | Indian Rupee | |
| 2012 | Shwetha Menon | Ozhimuri, Ithramathram | |
| 2013 | Remya Nambeesan | English: An Autumn in London, Nadan | |
| 2014 | Asha Sarath | Varsham | |
| 2015 | Parvathy | Ennu Ninte Moideen, Charlie | |
| 2016 | Nayanthara | Puthiya Niyamam | |
| 2017 | Manju Warrier | Udaharanam Sujatha, C/O Saira Banu | |
| 2018 | Anusree | Aadhi, Aanakkallan | |
| 2019 | Manju Warrier | Prathi Poovankozhi | |
| 2020 | Samyuktha Menon | Aanum Pennum, Vellam, Wolf | |
| 2020 | Surabhi Lakshmi | Jwalamukhi | |
| 2021 | Durga Krishna | Udal | |
| 2022 | Darshana Rajendran | Jaya Jaya Jaya Jaya Hey, Purusha Pretham | |
| 2023 | Nithya Menen | 19(1)(a) | |
| 2024 | Nazriya Nazim | Sookshmadarshini | |
| 2024 | Rima Kallingal | Theatre – The Myth of Reality | |

== See also ==
- Kerala Film Critics Association Award for Best Actress
