= Kerala Film Critics Association Award for Best Male Playback Singer =

Annual Indian film award

The Kerala Film Critics Association Award for Best Male Playback Singer is given annually at the Kerala Film Critics Association Awards, honouring the best male playback singer in Malayalam cinema.

== Superlatives ==
Wins	Recipient(s)
18	K. J. Yesudas
7	M. G. Sreekumar
3	Madhu Balakrishnan; P. Jayachandran
2	G. Venugopal

== Winners ==
Year	Recipient	Film	Ref.
1977	K. J. Yesudas	Various films	
1978	K. J. Yesudas	Various films	
1979	K. J. Yesudas	Various films	
1980	K. J. Yesudas	Various films	
1981	K. J. Yesudas	Various films	
1982	K. J. Yesudas	Various films	
1983	K. J. Yesudas	Various films	
1984	K. J. Yesudas	Various films	
1985	K. J. Yesudas	Various films	
1986	K. J. Yesudas	Various films	
1987	G. Venugopal	Thoovanathumbikal	
1988	P. Jayachandran	Vida Parayan Mathram, Simon Peter Ninakku Vendi	
1989	G. Venugopal	Mazhavilkavadi	
1990	K. J. Yesudas	Amaram	
1991	K. J. Yesudas	Bharatham	
1992	K. J. Yesudas	Kamaladalam, Sargam, Kudumbasammetham	
1993	K. J. Yesudas	Kalippattam, Sarovaram, Chenkol	
1994	K. J. Yesudas	Various films	
1995	K. J. Yesudas	Various films	
1996	K. J. Yesudas	Desadanam, Ee Puzhayum Kadannu, Thooval Kottaram	
1997	K. J. Yesudas	Kaliyattam, Aaraam Thampuran, Krishnagudiyil Oru Pranayakalathu	
1998	M. G. Sreekumar	Kottaram Veettile Apputtan, Punjabi House, Summer in Bethlehem	
1999	M. G. Sreekumar	Megham, Chandranudikkunna Dikkil, Vasanthiyum Lakshmiyum Pinne Njaanum	
2000	M. G. Sreekumar	Kattu Vannu Vilichappol	
2001	M. G. Sreekumar	Achaneyanenikkishtam, Praja	
2002	M. G. Sreekumar	Nandanam	
2003	P. Jayachandran	Gaurisankaram, Mizhi Randilum	
2004	Madhu Balakrishnan	—	
2005	M. G. Sreekumar	Mayookham, Balyam	
2006	M. G. Sreekumar	Keerthi Chakra, Pothan Vava	
2007	Vijay Yesudas	Nivedyam	
2008	Unni Menon	Veruthe Oru Bharya	
2009	Madhu Balakrishnan	Patham Nilayile Theevandi	
2010	Shankar Mahadevan	Holidays ("Indhumukhi Varumo")	
2011	Vidhu Prathap	—	
2012	Sreeram	Celluloid ("Katte Katte")	
2013	Najim Arshad	Drishyam, Immanuel	
2014	Sudeep Kumar	Varsham	
2015	P. Jayachandran	Ennu Ninte Moideen ("Sharadambaram")	
2016	Madhu Balakrishnan	Ottakolam, Kuppivala	
2017	Kallara Gopan	Kinar	
2018	Rakesh Brahmanandan	Pen Masala	
2019	Vijay Yesudas	Pathinettam Padi, Shyamaragam	
2020	P. K. Sunilkumar	Perfume	
2021	Sooraj Santhosh	Madhuram ("Ganamee")	
2022	K. S. Harisankar	Aanandam Paramanandam ("Enthinente Nenjinullile")	
2022	Ravisankar	Maadan ("Mazhayil")	

== See also ==
- Kerala Film Critics Association Award for Best Female Playback Singer
- Kerala Film Critics Association Award for Best Music Director
