= Manalur Assembly constituency =

Constituency of the Kerala legislative assembly in India

Manalur
- Constituency No. 64 for the Kerala Legislative Assembly
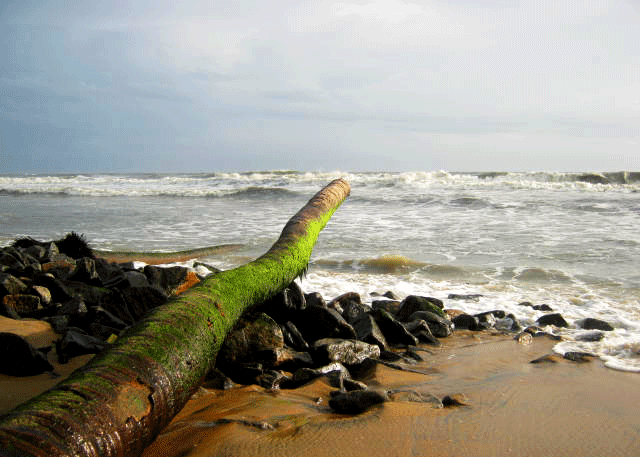
- Vadanappally Beach in Manalur Assembly constituency

Constituency details
- Country: India
- Region: South India
- State: Kerala
- District: Thrissur
- Established: 1957
- Reservation: None

Member of Legislative Assembly
- 16th Kerala Legislative Assembly
- Incumbent C. Raveendranath
- Party: CPIM
- Alliance: LDF
- Elected year: 2026

Manalur State assembly constituency is one of the 140 state legislative assembly constituencies in Kerala. It is also one of the seven state legislative assembly constituencies included in Thrissur Lok Sabha constituency. As of the 2026 Assembly elections, the current MLA is C. Raveendranath of CPI(M).

== Local self-governed segments ==
Thaikkad Gram panchayat, which was included in Manalur Assembly constituency under the 2008 delimitation, was merged with Guruvayur Municipality in 2010.

Manalur Assembly constituency is composed of the following local self-governed segments:

Sl no.	Name	Status (Grama panchayat/Municipality)	Taluk
1	Arimpur	Grama panchayat	Thrissur
2	Manalur	Grama panchayat	Thrissur
3	Guruvayur (Thaikkad region only)	Municipality	Chavakkad
4	Elavally	Grama panchayat	Chavakkad
5	Mullassery	Grama panchayat	Chavakkad
6	Vadanappally	Grama panchayat	Chavakkad
7	Pavaratty	Grama panchayat	Chavakkad
8	Venkitangu	Grama panchayat	Chavakkad
9	Choondal	Grama panchayat	Kunnamkulam
10	Kandanassery	Grama panchayat	Kunnamkulam

== Members of Legislative Assembly ==
The following list contains all members of Kerala Legislative Assembly who have represented the constituency:

Election	Niyama Sabha	Name	Party	Tenure
1957	1st	Joseph Mundassery	Communist Party of India	1957-1960
1960	2nd	Kurur Neelakandan Namboodiripad	Indian National Congress	1960-1965
1967	3rd	N. I. Devassikutty	Indian National Congress	1967 – 1970
1970	4th	N. I. Devassikutty	Indian National Congress	1970 - 1977
1977	5th	N. I. Devassikutty	Indian National Congress	1977-1980
1980	6th	V. M. Sudheeran	Indian National Congress	1980 – 1982
1982	7th	V. M. Sudheeran	Congress	1982 – 1987
1987	8th	V. M. Sudheeran	Indian National Congress	1987 – 1991
1991	9th	V. M. Sudheeran	Indian National Congress	1991 – 1996
1996	10th	Rosamma Chacko	Indian National Congress	1996 – 2001
2001	11th	M. K. Paulson Master	Indian National Congress	2001 – 2006
2006	12th	Murali Perunelly	Communist Party of India	2006 – 2011
2011	13th	P. A. Madhavan	Indian National Congress	2011 – 2016
2016	14th	Murali Perunelly	Communist Party of India	2016 – 2021
2021	15th	Murali Perunelly	Communist Party of India	2021 - 2026
2026	16th	C. Raveendranath	Communist Party of India	2026 -

== Election results ==
=== 2026 ===
2026 Kerala Legislative Assembly election: Manalur
Party	Candidate	Votes	%	±%
CPI(M)	C. Raveendranath	65,337	38.12	▼8.65
INC	T. N. Prathapan	65,211	38.05	▲9.12
BJP	K. K. Aneesh Kumar	38,125	22.24	▲0.41
SDPI	Dileef Abdul Khader	1,031	0.60	▼0.77
AAP	Unnikrishnan C. S.	330	0.19	
Independent	Ravindranath K.	234	0.14	
Independent	Prathapan	184	0.11	
IGP	Sivaprasad Gandhi K. M.	118	0.07	
Independent	P. V. Chandran	71	0.04	
Independent	Sujith K.S	70	0.04	
NOTA	None of the above	676	0.39	▼0.04
Margin of victory		126	0.07	▼17.77
Turnout		1,71,387		
CPI(M) hold		Swing	▼8.65	

=== 2021 ===
2021 Kerala Legislative Assembly election: Manalur
Party	Candidate	Votes	%	±%
CPI(M)	Murali Perunelly	78,337	46.77	▲3.47
INC	Vijay Hari	48,461	28.93	▼2.49
BJP	A. N. Radhakrishnan	36,566	21.83	▼1.34
SDPI	Faisal Ibrahim	2,294	1.37	▲0.46
NOTA	None of the above	712	0.43	▼0.02
Independent	M. K. Devarajan	660	0.39	N/A
BSP	Abhayan.N.A	472	0.28	▼0.08
Margin of victory		29,876	17.84	
Turnout		1,67,502		
CPI(M) hold		Swing		

=== 2016 ===
There were 2,11,930 registered voters in the constituency for the 2016 election.

2016 Kerala Legislative Assembly election: Manalur
Party	Candidate	Votes	%	±%
CPI(M)	Murali Perunelly	70,422	43.30	▼1.57
INC	O. Abdurahiman Kutty	51,097	31.42	▼13.8
BJP	A. N. Radhakrishnan	37,680	23.17	▲15.61
SDPI	Hussain K. K	1,180	0.73	▼0.91
NOTA	None of the above	730	0.45	−
BSP	Abhayan N. A.	588	0.36	▼1.57
PDP	Moidutty Haji	529	0.33	−
Independent	Shaji Kuriyan, Pananghat	262	0.16	▼0.02
Independent	Soman Pillai	132	0.08	−
Margin of victory		19,325	11.88	
Turnout		1,62,620	76.73	
CPI(M) gain from INC		Swing	▼1.57	

=== 2011 ===
There were 1,74,161 registered voters in the constituency for the 2011 election.

2011 Kerala Legislative Assembly election: Manalur
Party	Candidate	Votes	%	±%
INC	P. A. Madhavan	63,077	45.22	
CPI(M)	Baby John	62,596	44.87	
BJP	A. N. Radhakrishnan	10,543	7.56	
SDPI	P. K. Usman	2,293	1.64	
BSP	Suresh Tachapally	594	0.43	
Independent	Aravindakshan M. K.	388	0.28	−
Margin of victory		481	0.35	
Turnout		1,62,620	76.73	
INC gain from CPI(M)		Swing		
