= Jawahar Bal Bhavan Thrissur =

Music, dance and arts school in Kerala

Coordinates: 10.3157°N 76.1368°E

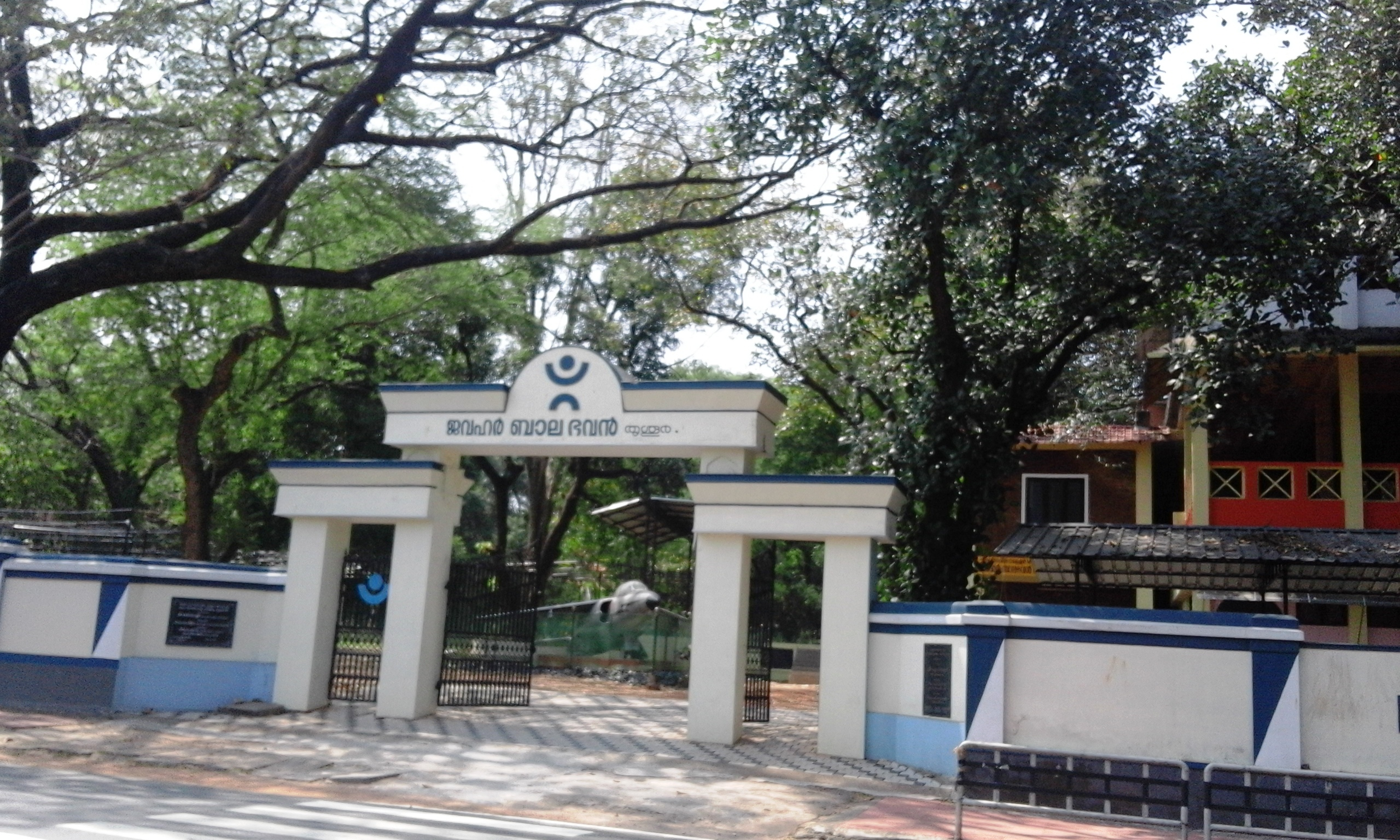
- Jawahar Bal Bhavan, Thrissur
- Type: Music and arts institution
- Established: 1991
- Director: P Krishnankutti Master
- Academic staff: 15
- Students: 300
- Location: Chembukkavu, Thrissur, Kerala, India
- Campus: Urban, nearly 1 acre of wooded land

The Jawahar Bal Bhavan Thrissur (Malayalam: ജവഹര്‍ ബാലഭവന്‍ തൃശൂര്‍, JBB Thrissur) is an autonomous music, dance and arts school in central Kerala and functions under the cultural department of government of Kerala. It is situated at Chembukkavu, in Thrissur (formerly Trichur) district. It was founded in 1991.

JBB Thrissur is a non-residential institute that occupies around 1 acre (0.40 ha) near the Thrissur Public Library and Sangeetha Nataka Academy. The institute has 16 faculties, 300 students, and seven administrative and supporting staff.

== History ==
Sri. Kuroor Neelakandan Nampoothiripadu established Jawahar Bal Bhavan in Thrissur to commemorate Jawaharlal Nehru. Even though the task of constructing a building was given to the Construction Corporation, due to financial constraints on the part of Jawahar Bal Bhavan the contractor did not hand over possession of the building in time. Ultimately, owing to protest by cultural activists, in 1990, the then Minister for Culture Sri. T.K.Ramakrishnan took measures to ensure the possession and ownership of the building in the name of 'Jawahar Bal Bhavan'.

The institution started functioning from 8 April 1991 and was inaugurated by Minister Sri. V.V.Raghavan. Sri. K.Radhakrishnan (former Mayor of Thrissur) was the first executive director of JBB Thrissur. A by-law was approved on 26 August 1992 and the institution was registered as a charitable society as per TC Act 12, 1955.

== Campus ==
The main entrance of JBB Thrissur is at the Chembukkavu Junction. The campus is close to the Thrissur Public Library, Thrissur Museum, Kerala State Financial Enterprises, Ramanilayam, Kerala Sangeetha Nataka Academy, Regional Theatre, Indoor Stadium Sports Complex, Prof Joseph Mundassery Smaraka Mandiram.

The campus is 2 km from the Thrissur Round, 4 km from the Thrissur Junction Railway station, and is connected by buses particularly those going to Ramavarmapuram region and Mannuthy region from North Bus Stand.

The campus is enriched with giant trees, providing scenic beauty and a habitat for birds. Visitors are greeted with a fighter jet which served in the historic Indo-Pak conflict of 1974.

There are two buildings of which one is 2 storied where classes are held for different subjects and the other is a hall.

== Departments ==
Jawahar Bal Bhavan Thrissur offers courses for 15 disciplines:

- Classical Music
- Classical Dance
- Violin
- Mridangam
- Tabla
- Guitar
- Clay Modelling
- Drawing
- Magic
- Judo

== Teachers ==
- Classical Dance: Smt.SreeParvathy.V.S
- Violin: Sri.Ramaprasad,
- Mridangam: Sri.Biju.P.G.
- Tabla: Sri.Mahesh.K.Mon.
- Guitar: Sri. Santhosh kumar
- Clay Modelling: Sri.Sreekumar p
- Judo: Sri. Joy Varghese.K.
- Magic :
- drawing: santhakumari
- classical music:

== Academics ==
[Violin class] Jawahar Bal Bhavan Thrissur offers courses across 16 disciplines in music, dance, arts and martial arts. About 16 faculty members belonging to the above-mentioned fields are engaged in teaching and guiding the students. The institute has 16 departments and regular classes (from June to March) are conducted on all days except on Mondays and Tuesdays. On weekends, classes begins at 8:00AM and ends at 1.30PM while on other working days the class hours are between 4.00PM and 6.00PM. Each student can take at most three subjects of their choice and can attend the classes in their assigned slots.

== Other academic activities ==
- Venalkoodaram

Venalkoodaram, a two-month-long summer camp for children up to the age of 17, is an initiative from JBB Thrissur. Over 1,500 students from the state attend the camp to explore traditional arts, dances, music and martial arts. This camp allows children to interact with students from different regions of the state. Bal bhavan offers two more extra subjects during Sargolsavam. Except on Sundays, classes are held on all other days. Bal bhavan organizes tour trips, snake show, elephant show, residential camp and lectures and demonstrations for the students in Venalkoodaram. The Venalkoodaram ends with the 'Annual Day Celebrations' during the last week of May.

- Annual Day

The Annual Day celebrations are held in the last week of May every year. The two months long Sargolsavam ends with this. For non-performing subjects like crafts, clay modelling, drawing, tailoring, computer arts etc., there is an exhibition at Bal Bhavan during the first two days of annual day where paintings, models etc. are displayed for the general public. The second part of annual day is usually held at Thrissur Public Library (sometimes at Regional Theatre) during the last two days. There are programs in music, dance, instrumental music, and martial arts. Events like Julgalbandhi, dance, violin, and performance by teachers and old students are held.

- Balshree Award

The Balshree Award is given by the President of India to students who come top in Creative Writing (CW), Creative Arts (CA), Creative Performance (CP), and Creative Science and Innovation (CS) each year. There are district level, zonal level and all India level competition. Since there are no National Jawahar Bal Bhavan in northern kerala, aspiring students from Kozhikode, Malappuram, Kannur, Kasargode come to JBB Thrissur for the local selections. The all India competition is held at Delhi Bal Bhavan during the last week of December. The winners are given the Balshree award by the president of India.

== Venalkoodaram 2012 - main events ==
- 1349 students attended
- Inaugurated under the chairmanship of Mayor I.P. Paul by MLA Therambil Ramakrishnan on 2 April
- 7 April: Kochu TV recorded performances of students of JBB Thrissur.
- 9 April: Cine Fame Reeja Venugopal (Mallika) visited.
- 10–12 April: Eye Test Camp conducted by Dr.Jyothi. It was coordinated by Eye Vision. Over 600 students were tested.
- 13 April: Vishu celebrations. Thrissur corporation arranged biscuits for students.
- 17 April: Cine Fame Sreejith Ravi visited.
- 26 April: Talk about elephants by Dr. Giridhas and female elephant named 'Lakshmi' of Thiruvambady Devaswom was also brought to JBB Thrissur campus. On the same day, students of JBB Thrissur performed in the Thrissur Pooram Exhibition stage.
- 27–28 April: Educational tour to Peechi Dam forest and Kothakulam beach.
- 4 May: Talk about Snakes by Xavier.
- 8 May: Mimicry show by comedian Nandakishore.
- 10 May: Dr. Aravindan Vallachira organised a movie show.
- 11–12 May: Residential Camp for students who are above 2nd standard. Around 90 students and 35 staffs participated.
- 14 May: Interactive session between MLA's and student. Ollur MLA Mr.M. P. Vincent and Manalur MLA Mr.P. A. Madhavan shared their experiences with students.
- 15–17 May: Talk conducted by IMA Blood Bank.
- 27–28 May: 21st annual day celebrations at Thrissur Town Hall and closing ceremony of Venalkoodaram 2012.
- 29–30 May: Clay modelling, painting, craft exhibition at JBB Thrissur.

== Executive directors ==
- K Radhakarishnan (22.02.1991 - 06.10.2005)
- C R Das (26.02.2007 - 08.08.2011)
- P Krishnankutti mastar (30.11.2017-present

== Principals ==
- K Raghavankutty (05.04.1991 - 13.08.1993)
- N Radha Bai (04.06.1994 - 06.07.1994)
- N.P.Parukkutty (15.10.1994 - 31.05.1999)
- P.N.Bhaskaran (11.07.1999 - 09.06.2011)
- P.R.Jacob (13.10.2011-13.08.2016)
- R.V.Ramaprasad(14.8.2016-30.1.2018)
- N. Narayani (1.2.2018-
