= Holidays (2010 film) =

- Film poster
- Directed by: M M Ramachandran (Atlas Ramachandran)
- Written by: Mohan Thomas
- Produced by: T. Satheesh Babu
- Starring: Kalabhavan Mani; Vinu Mohan; Muktha; Priya Lal; Rejith Menon
- Cinematography: Ulpal V Nayanar
- Edited by: K. Rajagopal
- Music by: Alex Paul
- Distributed by: Cinema Factory Release
- Release date: 12 November 2010
- Country: India
- Language: Malayalam

Holidays is 2010 Malayalam film directed by M M Ramachandran (Atlas Ramachandran), starring Kalabhavan Mani, Vinu Mohan, Rejith Menon, Muktha and Priya Lal in the lead roles. The film is about a few IT professionals, who arrive at Kochi and get entangled in a web of problems.

== Plot ==
The story involves a bunch of youngsters Alby (Vinu Mohan), Janet (Muktha), Riya (Priya Lal), Soumitran (Rejith), Sudhi (Sudheesh) and a few others who are planning the elopement of Sudhi and his lover, since Sudhi's lover is about to get engaged to Commisinoer Vinod (Kalabhavan Mani) who is also a tough cop. On the way they rescue a pretty young girl by the name of Lekha (Sruthi Lakshmi) from the hands of a few ruffians, but later find the girl murdered. They flee to a tea estate in Munnar, but the murderer is close at hand.

== Cast ==
- Vinu Mohan as Alby
- Muktha as Janet
- Priya Lal as Riya
- Rejith Menon as Soumitran
- Sudheesh as Sudhi
- Sruthi Lakshmi as Lekha Paul
- Biyon as Rajesh
- Harishree Ashokan as Thangappan
- Kalabhavan Mani as City Police Commissioner Vinod
- Anoop Chandran as Veeramani
- Roopasree Asokan
- Anil Murali
- Karatte Raja
- Devan as Chandrashekaran Varma
- Tony as Rajesh's father
- Urmila Unni as Chandrashekaran Varma's wife
- Ambika Mohan as Vinod's mother
- Mini Arun
- Jolly

== Production ==
The film is produced by T. Satheesh Babu, under the banner of Cinema Factory, and directed by businessman and chairman of Atlas Group, M M Ramachandran (Atlas Ramachandran). It is his first venture as a director, but he has produced certain critically acclaimed films like Vaishali, Dhanam etc., and has acted in films like Arabikatha, Anandabhairavi etc.

== Soundtrack ==
Holidays

Soundtrack album by Alex Paul
- Released: 2010
- Genre: Film soundtrack
- Label: Manorama Music
- Producer: T. Satheesh Babu

The original score and songs were composed by Alex Paul, with lyrics penned by Kaithapram and Santhosh Varma. The soundtrack received mixed responses. Sify's review was negative saying, "Alex Paul's tunes are pretty ordinary". They also commented that "A song pops out every other moment, which is almost always a dream sequence."

#	Song	Artist(s)
1	"Indhumukhi Varumo"	Shankar Mahadevan
2	"Holidays"	Priya Lal, Vidhu Prathap
3	"Pathinathina"	Madhu Balakrishnan, Jyotsna
4	"Thamara Valla"	Vidhu Prathap, Manjari

== Release and reception ==
The movie was released on 12 November 2010, in thirty six theatres by Cinema Factory Release.

The film was met with nearly unanimous negative reviews. Several critics reviewed that the movie lacked a good script and the direction by the businn tycoon was worse than poor. Sify reviewed the film saying, "With a ridiculous plot that has been presented as a thriller, Dr.M M Ramachandran's Holidays is an amateurish attempt, to say the least. The script, visuals, music and the performances doesn't help in making things better either."
