= Atlas Ramachandran =

Indian jeweller, film producer and actor (1942–2022)

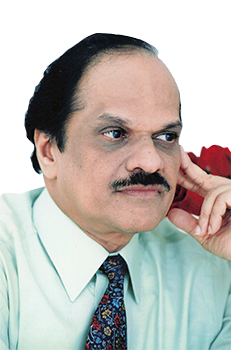
- Born: M. M. Ramachandran; 31 July 1942; Mullassery, Kingdom of Cochin
- Died: 2 October 2022 (aged 80); Dubai, United Arab Emirates
- Education: St. Thomas College, Thrissur, Delhi School of Economics
- Occupations: Jeweller; Director; Film Producer; Actor
- Title: Chairman of Atlas Jewellery
- Spouse: Indira Ramachandran
- Children: 2

M. M. Ramachandran (31 July 1942 – 2 October 2022), better known as Atlas Ramachandran, was an Indian jeweller, film producer and actor. He was the chairman of Atlas Jewellery and is known for the tagline of his jewellery, "Janakodikalude Vishwastha Sthapanam" (transl. "The people's trusted establishment"). He had produced and distributed films under the banner "Chandrakanth Films". Vaisali (1988) and Sukrutham (1994) are the major films that he has produced. He has also acted in a few movies notably in Subhadram (2007) in a lead role.

== Early life & career ==
Ramachandran was born at Mullassery in the Thrissur District of Kerala on 31 July 1942 into a family with a rich cultural and literary background. His father, V. Kamalakara Menon (d. 1995), was a poet, and there were frequent Akshara Shlokam recitation sessions at his home. Ramachandran was the third of the eight children and the second son.

After acquiring his bachelor's degree in commerce from St. Thomas College, Thrissur, he moved to Delhi to begin his professional career as a banker with Canara Bank and then with State Bank of India.

== Career ==
In Delhi, Ramachandran started his career in the banking industry. He joined Canara Bank and completed a post-graduate degree in economics from the Delhi School of Economics. Later on, selected as a probationary officer by the State Bank of India, he moved to the State Bank of Travancore where he was a field officer, accountant and manager. By the time he left the bank, he was the superintendent of over 100 branches.

In 1974, he moved to Kuwait City to work for the Commercial Bank of Kuwait. He assumed the post of Administration Manager of the International Division.

Having been convinced of the immense demand for gold ornaments, he opened the first ATLAS showroom in Souk Al Watya in Kuwait.

Kuwait was looted during the Gulf War and Ramachandran experienced a total loss, so he started over in the United Arab Emirates. He introduced the concept of mega-offers in the regional gold trade. From gold bars to luxurious cars, shoppers won generous prizes. ATLAS served well over a million customers. This led to the coining of the now famous slogan, "ATLAS jewellery-Trusted by Millions", with Ramachandran himself serving as the brand ambassador and lending his face and voice for the advertisements.

== Philanthropy ==
Both in his adopted home in the Persian Gulf and in India, his community initiatives include welfare, education, film, literature and music. He gave scores of gold medals in the UAE schools. He also gave scholarships to deserving students of limited means in Kerala. In the same way, customers of Atlas Jewellery were handed over the ornaments selected by them even if they were short of money. He patronised many competitions including reciting the Quran held by the Islamic organisations in the Persian Gulf region.

== Legal troubles ==
In the United Arab Emirates (as in many Arab countries in the Persian Gulf region), loans are secured with a signed cheque for the entire loan amount. Loan providers could present this cheque at any time. If a cheque cannot be processed because the account holder has insufficient funds this can be escalated into a criminal matter and debtors jailed to recoup debt. This is contrary to most developed countries where there are no security cheques and these types of issues only result in civil cases. In the Middle East, many business owners quietly leave the country when they face liquidity issues. Ramachandran stayed in the country to resolve his business and legal troubles. However, he was detained by the Dubai Police in August 2015. He sought to have his charges suspended but did not receive bail and was then imprisoned three months later by the Dubai Court. While in prison, his hospitals were sold to repay some loans. However, most jewellery shops simply closed and became insolvent. After nearly three years, he was released in June 2018. There was a major amendment made to UAE Federal Law on 2 January 2022 that decriminalised bounced cheques.

== Death ==
Ramachandran died in a hospital in Dubai on 2 October 2022 following a cardiac arrest. He was 80.

== Filmography ==
Ramachandran ventured into film production and distribution. He was known as Vaisali Ramachandran due to the fame of his debut film production Vaisali, an episode from Mahabharata, which was a classic in the Malayalam film industry. He resigned from the Commercial Bank to focus solely on the jewellery business and motion pictures. At the time of his resignation, he was one of the most highly respected and highly paid bank managers in Kuwait. With his new focus, he either produced or distributed the hit films Sukrutham, Dhanam, Kauravar, Chakoram, Vasthuhara, Innale and Venkalam. A number of his films were selected to Indian Panorama, were critically acclaimed, and won prestigious awards.

Year	Title	Director	Role	Notes
1988	Vaisali	Bharathan	Producer	
1990	Anantha Vruthantham	P. Anil	Distributor	
1990	Innale	P. Padmarajan	Distributor	
1991	Vasthuhara	G. Aravindan	Distributor	
1991	Dhanam	Sibi Malayil	Producer	
1992	Kauravar	Joshiy	Distributor	
1993	Venkalam	Bharathan	Distributor	
1994	Sukrutham	Harikumar	Producer	
1994	Chakoram	M. A. Venu	Distributor	
2004	Youth Festival	Jose Thomas	Actor	
2007	Anandabhairavi	Jayaraj	Actor	
2007	Arabikkatha	Lal Jose	Actor	
2007	Subhadram	Sreelal Devaraj	Actor	
2008	Malabar Wedding	Rajesh-Faisal	Actor	
2009	2 Harihar Nagar	Lal	Actor	
2010	Holidays	M. M. Ramachandran	Director	
2010	Thatwamasi	Swami Viswa Chaithanya (Sunil)	Actor	
2010	3 Char Sou Bees	Govindankutty	Actor	
2010	Brahmasthram	V. Somanath	Actor	
2013	Bombay Mittayi	Umer Karikkad	Actor	
2014	Balyakala Sakhi	Pramod Payyannur	Actor	
2016	Daivathinte Kayyoppu	Benny Ashamsa	Actor	
2016	Meghangal (Tele Film)	Shaji Kallur	Actor	
