= JBB (disambiguation) =

JBB refers to Balad Air Base, an Iraqi Air Force base.

JBB may also refer to:

- Notohadinegoro Airport, the IATA code JBB
- JBB Thrissur, an autonomous music, dance and arts school
- a benchmark suite; see Standard Performance Evaluation Corporation § JBB
