= P. A. Madhavan =

Indian politician (1946–2026)

P.A.Madhavan
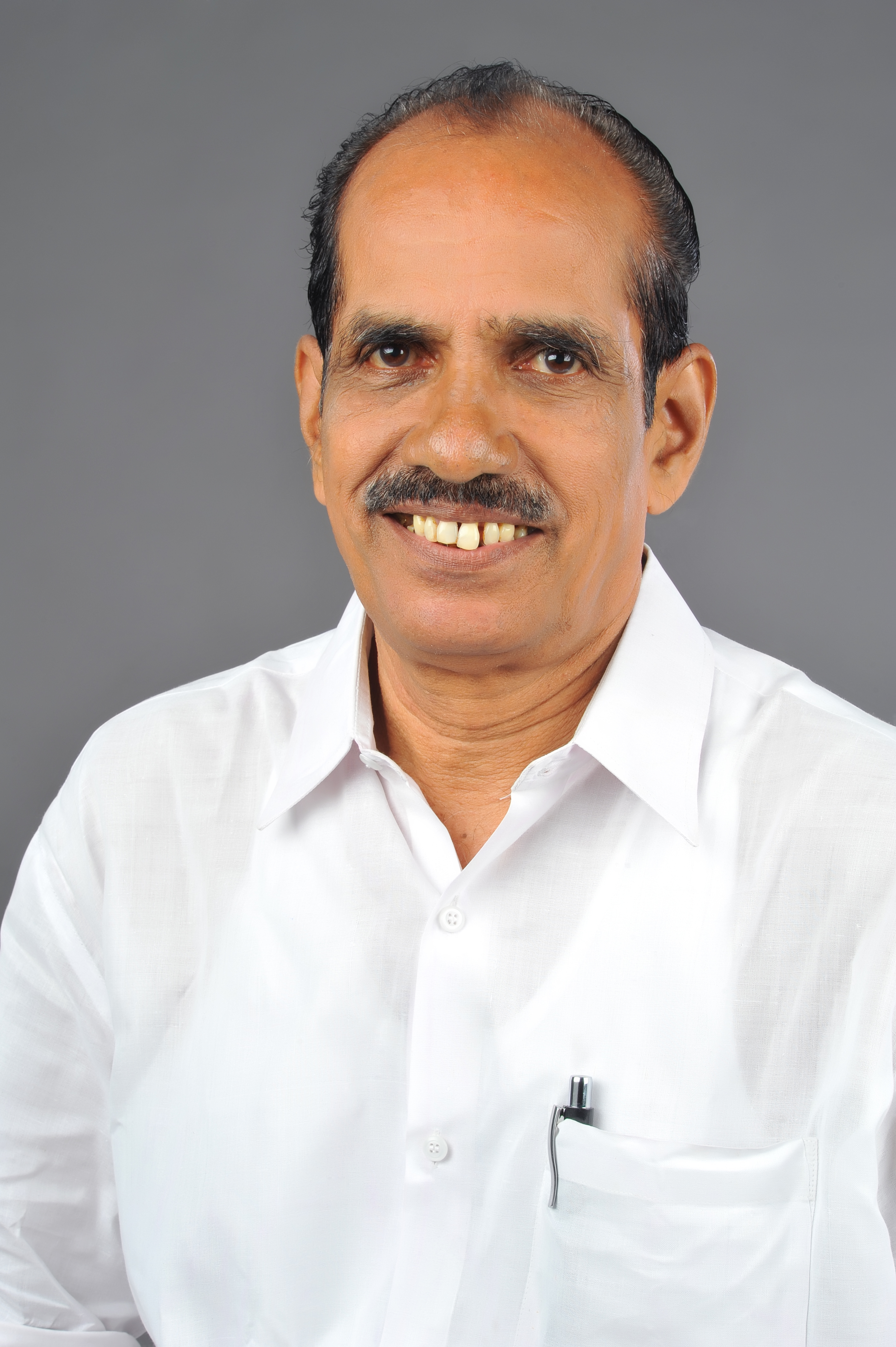

Former Member of the Kerala Legislative Assembly
- In office 2011–2016
- Preceded by: Murali Perunelly
- Succeeded by: Murali Perunelly
- Constituency: Manalur

Personal details
- Born: 14 September 1946 Mundoor, Thrissur, India
- Died: 30 June 2026 (aged 79) Ernakulam, India
- Party: Indian National Congress

P. Achuthan Nair Madhavan (14 September 1946 – 30 June 2026) was an Indian National Congress politician from Thrissur and onetime Member of the Kerala Legislative Assembly from Manaloor Assembly Constituency (2011–2016).

== Life and career ==
Madhavan was born in Mundur, Thrissur on 14 September 1946, to P. Achuthan Nair and Malamelpattiyath Parvathy Amma. He was a licensed document writer since 1967.

As an active socio-political worker from the young age of 13, leading student agitations as part of Vimochana Samaram he held offices of Indian Youth Congress Block President (1968–1969), Indian Youth Congress District Secretary (1969–1972), Indian Youth Congress District General Secretary (1972–1977), and Indian Youth Congress District President (1977–1980).

Kerala Pradesh Congress Committee Executive Member, All India Congress Committee Member 2005–2012, District Congress Committee President 2016–2017, District Congress Committee Vice-President (2006–2011), District Congress Committee General Secretary (1980–2006), United Democratic Front (Kerala) District Chairman (2006–2008); Thrissur District Panchayat Leader of Opposition (2000–2005).

Sitaram Spinning and Weaving Mills Director (1980–1983); Mala Co-operative Spinning Mills Chairman (1996-2002); Malsya Vilpana Thozhilali Sahakarana Sangham, Thrissur District President (since 1994).

President, National Textile Corporation Show-Room Employees (Kerala), Kerala Laxmi Mills Pullazhi Employees Union, Railway Goods –Shed Workers Union, Thrissur, Municipal Corporation Electricity Employees Union, Thrissur, KSEB Thozhilali Union, Thrissur and Pharmaceutical Corporation Employees Union.

Madhavan died at Renai Medicity in Ernakulam, on the night of 30 June 2026, due to the complications caused by a road collision in February of that year. He was survived by his wife, Savithri, and a son, Sameer.
