= Chittaattukara =

Chittattukara
- Market
- Location in Kerala, India Chittattukara (India)
- Coordinates: 10°34′0″N 76°5′0″E
- Country: India
- State: Kerala
- District: Thrissur

Population (2001)
  - Total: 11,665

Languages
  - Official: Malayalam, English
- Time zone: UTC+5:30 (IST)
- PIN: 680511
- Vehicle registration: KL-8
- Nearest city: Guruvayur
- Literacy: 100%
- Lok Sabha constituency: Thrissur
- Vidhan Sabha constituency: Manalur
- Climate: hot (Köppen)

Chittattukara is a town in Elavally village in Thrissur district in the state of Kerala, India. The Elavally Panchayath Office and the Village Office are situated there. All commodities are sold there. The Market area of Chittattukara is covered by a kilometre. Most of the buildings in that market are as old as over 300 years.

== Cultural heritage ==
There are three Catholic Syrian Churches in Chittattukara from East to West and the market is dominated by the Christians since many centuries. There are three major schools:

- The Church School.
- Vidya Vihar Central School.
- Sree Gokulam Public School

Professor P.K. Koru, the 20th century Astronomer, Mathematician was from Chittattukara of the Elavally village, who wrote a Malayalam commentary to Puthumana Somayaji's Karanapaddhati, is a mathematical treatise in Sanskrit, which had printed in Malayalam script. As an independent political leader he represented Guruvayur Constituency to the Kerala Legislative Assembly between 1957 and 1959. Nakshatra Dipika, Malayalam Technical Lexicon, Jyotisha Balabodhini are his other major works. Also see the link:

== Facilities ==
Ayurvedic Medical Shops, Allopathic Medical Shops, Rice Mills, Oil Mills, Petrol Pump, Stationery shops, Grocery shops, Vegetable Markets, Bakery, Fish Markets, Meat Markets etc. are available here.
