= Neha Ratnakaran =

Indian actress and model

- Born: Neha Ratnakaran; 24 March 1997 (age 29); Kannur, Kerala, India
- Education: Graduate
- Occupations: Actress, Model
- Years active: 2014–present
- Title: Miss Malabar 2013 (1st runner up)

Neha Ratnakaran is an Indian actress and model. She participated in Miss Malabar 2013 and was crowned 1st runner up.

She has appeared in Tamil, Malayalam and Telugu films. She made her acting debut in the Tamil film Ivanuku Thannila Gandam (2015).

== Early life and education ==
Neha Ratnakaran was born and brought up in Kannur, Kerala. She has an elder sister and an elder brother. She attended K. V. Kannur and K. V. Keltron Nagar thereafter. She started her modelling career while she was in high school. During her stint as a Beauty pageant, she was the 1st runner up in Miss Malabar 2013 competition. Before coming to movies she has done commercials for Colombo umbrella, Atlas Jewellery. She is a B.Com. graduate .

== Career ==
She started her career in 2014 with a Tamil movie, but it was not released. She made her acting debut in the Tamil film, Ivanuku Thannila Gandam (2015).

== Filmography ==
Year	Film	Role	Language	Notes
2015	Ivanuku Thannila Gandam	Deepika	Tamil	Debut
2016	Uchathula Shiva	Vidya/Nila	Tamil	
2018	Ondikatta		Tamil	
2017	Chicken Kokaachi	Smitha	Malayalam	
2018	Lalijo Lalijo		Telugu	
2019	Old is Gold	Kalyani	Malayalam	
