= Jordan Investment Commission =

Investment promotion agency of Jordan

Coordinates: 31°57′53″N 35°53′5″E

Hashemite Kingdom of Jordan Jordan Investment Commission (JIC)
- هيئة الاستثمار -Jordan Investment Commission

Agency overview
- Headquarters: Amman (Jordan)
- Agency executives: Hatem Al Halawani, Chairman; Thabit elwir, Acting CEO
- Website: www.jic.gov.jo

Jordan Investment Commission (JIC), previously Jordan Investment Board, is the national investment promotion agency of the Hashemite Kingdom of Jordan.

== History ==
The Jordan Investment Board was founded in 2014, the year the Investment Promotion Law was introduced.

In 2014, to fight off the corruption factors facing foreign investors, Abdullah II of Jordan passed a new investment law that unified all bodies concerned with investment in the newly formed Jordan Investment Commission. In September 2015, the Kingdom signed a $7 billion investment deal agreement with China, and put the JIC in charge of fully enabling those investments in Jordan.

In September 2017, the Abdullah II of Jordan visited the JIC and reminded its strategic role in the Jordan Economic Growth Plan 2018-2022. In October 2017, the JIC signed a cooperation deal with the UAE's Ministry of economy for a protocol on technical cooperation regarding company registration.

== Activity ==
JIB Headquarters, Amman

=== Services ===
The Jordan Investment Commission is responsible for acquiring and providing professional consulting services to foreign and domestic investors who want to invest in the growing economy of Jordan. One of the main targets is to distribute the benefits of investment among the population and geographically across the governorates by promoting sectors of strategic importance through incentives to investors. The promotion strategy includes targeted trade and promotion missions abroad and in Jordan, as well as participation in international conferences and forums. JIB also provides information about Jordan as a business location, assists in licensing and registration, and advises companies on all relevant issues:

- Incentives to projects falling under strategic sectors, investment related information.
- Liaison between investors and both the Jordanian public and private sectors.
- Grant financial exemptions (exemptions from customs fee and sales taxes).
- Provide after-care services.
- Policy advocacy through surveying any challenges faced by investors.

The JIC invests the following markets: Industry/manufacturing, agriculture, hotels, hospitals, maritime, transport & railways, leisure and recreational compounds, convention and exhibition centers, transport and distribution of water, gas and oil, call and contact centers, research and development centers.

JIB has offices in China, USA, Qatar, UAE and Kuwait.

=== Jordan Investment Map ===
The Investment Map Project is an initiative that provides investors with 150 project ideas, and pre-feasibility studies for 75 of them in thirteen sectors including: Agriculture, Apparel and Textiles, Chemicals, Construction, Education, Energy and Utilities, Food and Beverage, Health, Information and Communication Technology, Mining and Processing, Pharmaceutical products, and Tourism.

Project concepts were derived from an extensive study of more than 30 sectors and sub sectors of Jordan during an analysis of the country's economy. Thirteen sectors were then selected and assessed, followed with an integrated selection framework to choose the most promising sectors in terms of growth, sustainability and potential returns. Project concepts were born from a value chain analysis and workshops with industry experts and leaders.

=== One-Stop-Shop ===
Once an investor decides to proceed with their investment they could visit JIB's One-Stop-Shop, an approach to full service assistance for investors consisting of licensing and registration services. Through this service an investor can register and license his/her project in Jordan at one place within 14 days.

Investments Benefiting from the Investment Promotion Law

=== Development Zones ===
In order to encourage investors to focus on areas which should serve as enabling platforms for specific sectors the several so called “Business/Development Zones” were created. These areas offer particular advantages from industry specific infrastructure; proximity to necessary human resources, as well was raw materials and attractive tax breaks. By enacting these laws the Government of Jordan provides the robust legal foundation to ensure a business friendly investment and operating environment.

- King Hussein Bin Talal Development Area KHBTDA (Mafraq)
- Ma'an Development Area
- Irbid Development Area
- The Dead Sea Development Zone
- The Jabal Ajloun Development Area
- The Business Park in Dabouq

== Figures ==
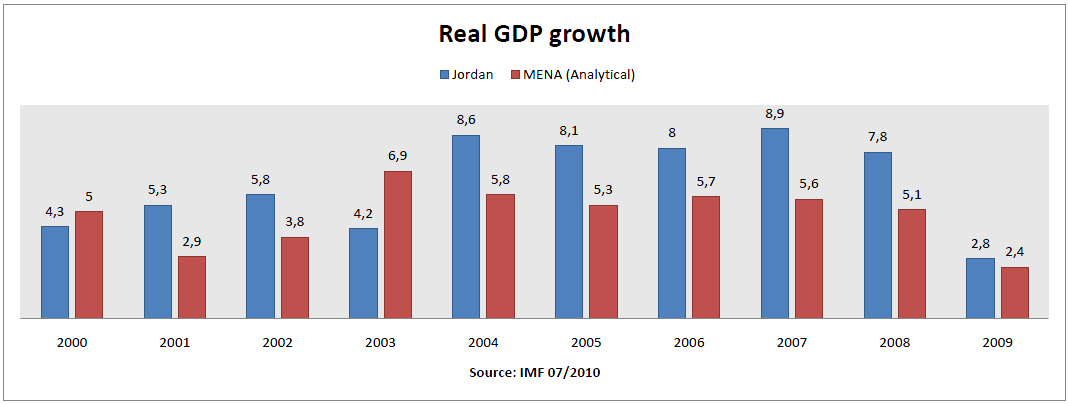
Real GDP growth

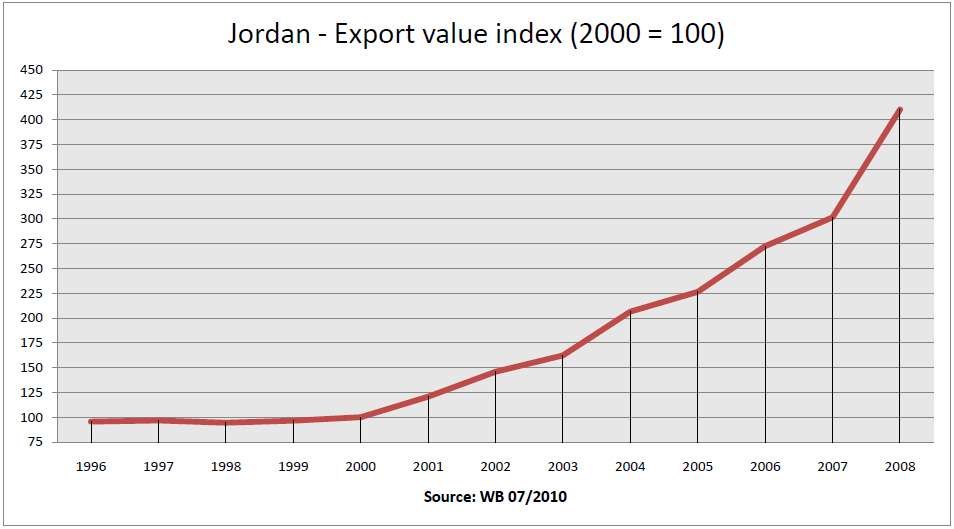
Foreign direct investment, net inflows (BoP, current US$)

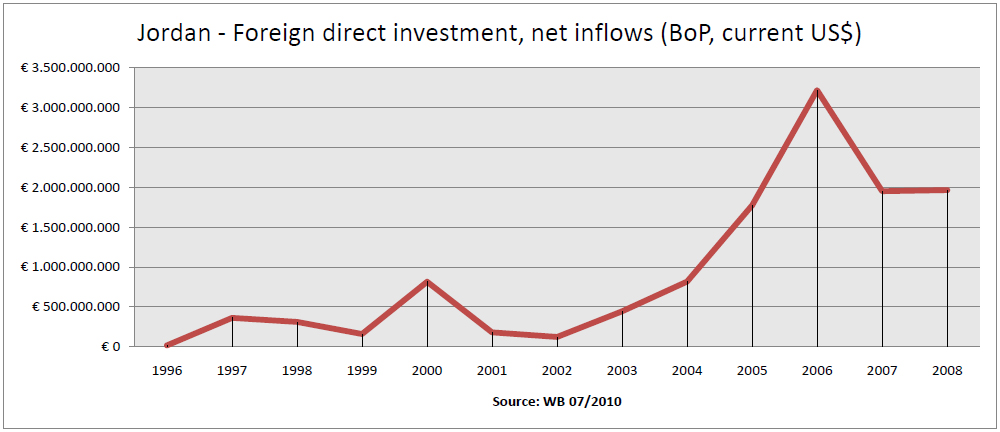
Export value index (2000 = 100)
