= Murali Perunelly =

Indian politician

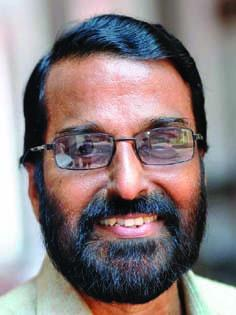

Member of the Kerala Legislative Assembly
- In office 2016–2026
- Constituency: Manalur

Personal details
- Born: 19 June 1950 (age 76) Oorakam

Murali Raghavan Perunelly is an Indian politician who was a member of the Kerala Legislative Assembly from Manalur constituency, representing Communist Party of India (Marxist). He was born at Oorakam, Thrissur on 19 June 1950. His parents were T. Raghavan Nair, a freedom fighter and P. Malathy Amma. He is a Secretariat member of CPI (M) District Committee, Thrissur and Kerala Karshaka Sangam Working Committee. He has a bachelor's degree in science and is an agriculturist. He married Mallika and they have a daughter.

He served as a Vice President of Mullassery Grama Panchayat, President of Annakara Service Sangham, Advisory Board member of Viyoor Central Jail, DYFI Thrissur District Committee Member, Vice President of Thrissur Toddy Workers Union and Secretary of CPI (M) Manalur Area Committee.
