= United Arab Emirates corporate law =

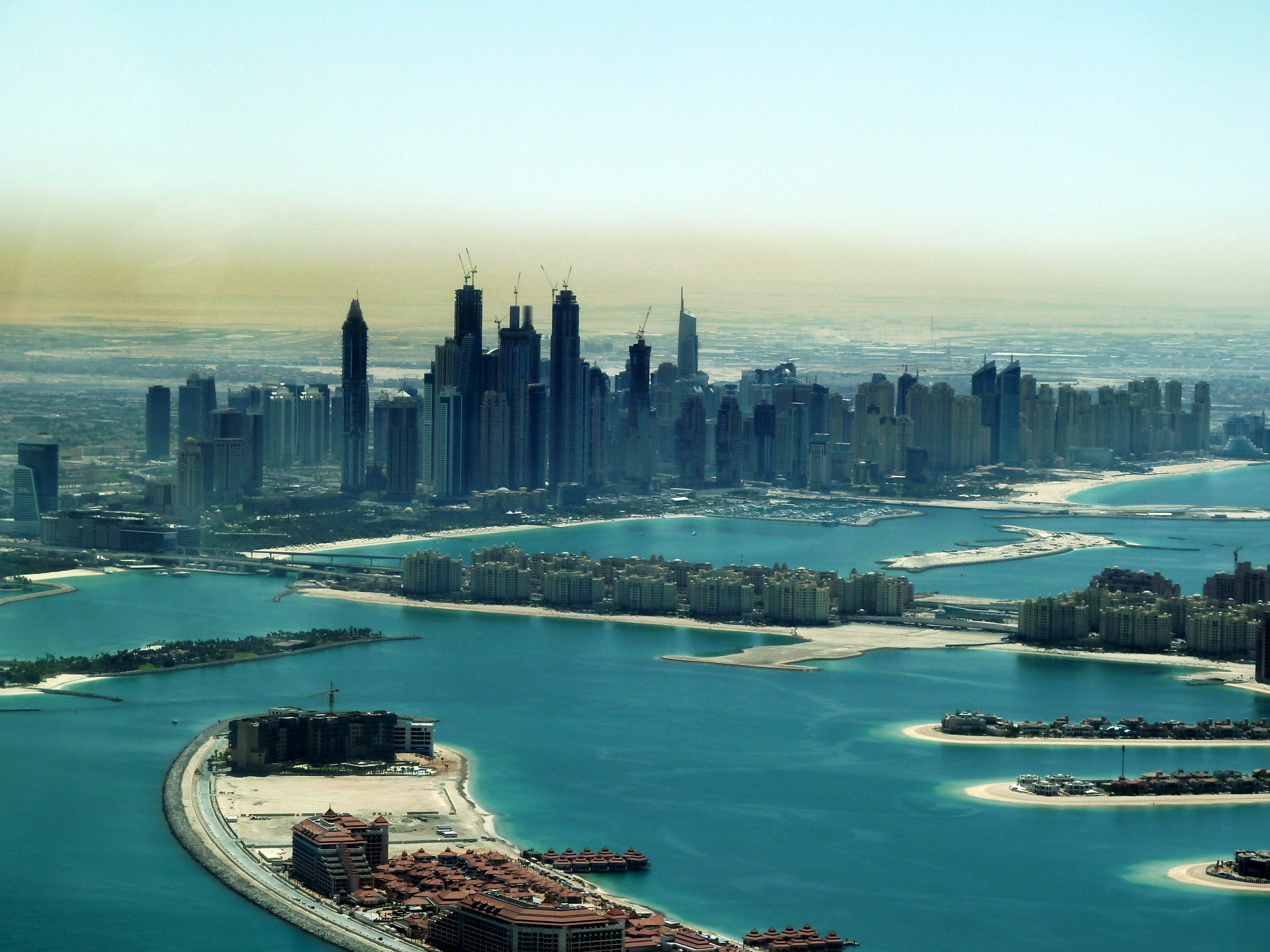
Panoramic view of Dubai

United Arab Emirates corporate law regulates the governance, finance and power of corporations in the United Arab Emirates (UAE) through UAE law. Every emirate has its own basic corporate code.

== History of Corporate Law in the UAE ==
The United Arab Emirates was established in 1971, and many of the laws that the country currently has were established then, with the exception of some that were overhauled to reflect the progress of the country. Prior to becoming the UAE, the emirates were called the Trucial States. These Trucial States had developed their legal systems in various ways prior to becoming the UAE. However, because each emirate developed under Islamic law, they had that in common. Islamic law was the main similarity between each emirates' legal system, though other forces caused similarities, such as major world events, tribal law in shared areas, and decrees by high ranking officials. Islamic law is partially incorporated into UAE law, with sharia law being the most dominant type of Islamic law. The UAE constitution gives each emirate the right to govern as they see fit in areas that are not already outlined by the constitution. When the UAE was first established, corporate law and regulations were largely left up to the individual emirates. Until the federal government began to take more control of corporate law in 1979, the regulation of business was very informal in the emirates and varied on a case-by-case basis. However, the federal government of the UAE has codified many laws pertaining to business and corporate life, making corporate law significantly more standardized.

== Types of Business License ==
The types of business licenses issued in the UAE are professional, commercial, industrial and tourism. The professional license covers services offered by professionals, artisans and craftsmen; the commercial license covers all trading and commercial activities performed with an intention of making profit, the industrial license covers all industrial and manufacturing activities, and the tourism license covers all activities related to hospitality & tourism. The type of license depends on the business activity of the company or enterprise.

== Jurisdiction of the Company ==
In the UAE, a company can be formed in any of the following three jurisdictions: Mainland, Free Zone and Offshore. The licensing authority in the mainland jurisdiction is the Department of Economic Development of the respective emirate. In Free Zones, the relevant Free Zone Authority will be the licensing authority and respective Offshore Authority in the case of an Offshore jurisdiction.

=== Mainland Company ===
A mainland company is an onshore company. A license to establish the entity is issued by the Department of Economic Development (DED) of the respective emirate. A mainland business is allowed to do business in the local UAE market as well as outside the UAE without any restrictions. It is necessary to understand the term "Mainland" as per DED's definition in order for an entrepreneur to make a decision to register a Mainland Company in the UAE. Different types of licenses under mainland jurisdiction are:

- Professional license
- Commercial license
- Industrial license
- Tourism license

For all licenses, the UAE now allows 100% of shares to be owned by those from other countries, but residing in the UAE, as indicated in the latest decree.

Following are the facts about Mainland Companies in UAE:

1. These companies are regulated under Federal Law No. 2 of 2015, which came in to effect on 1 July 2015.
2. Individuals who are from other countries, but reside in the UAE can now own 100% of the shares in any commercial limited liability company (LLC) located in the mainland areas. Previously, non-UAE citizens were only allowed to own 49% of a business's shares.
3. A GCC national can own 100% shares in any company.
4. GCC companies or an individual GCC national can create a partnership with a UAE national.
5. For certain business activities, as per law, only a UAE national can own 100% of the shares.
6. Business activities covered under professional category can be 100% owned by people from other countries living in the UAE or foreigners, but it is mandatory to have a UAE national as a service agent.
7. A mainland company is considered an on shore business entity in the UAE

=== Free Zone Company ===
Establishing a business entity in one of the UAE's many Free trade zones (FTZs) can be an attractive option for foreign investors. The UAE has over 35 FTZs, more than 20 of which are located in Dubai. The main attraction for setting up a company in a free zone is that there is no requirement to have a UAE national as a partner in the business. All free zones in UAE offer the following incentives:

- 100% foreign ownership of the enterprises
- 100% import and export tax exemptions
- 100% repatriation of capital and profits
- No currency restrictions
- Corporate tax exemption for 15 years, renewable for an additional 15 years
- No personal income taxes

UAE Free Zone companies can only operate within the free zone boundaries and are often limited to performing solely the activities listed in their license(s).

It is mandatory for every company registered in the Free Zone to lease the minimum amount of office space within that particular Free Zone. If the number of employees are few, then the company can lease a co-working space located within the free zone. However, if the number of employees are higher, they would be required to lease a dedicated office space within the free zone. A Free Zone Company can obtain UAE residence visas for the director, shareholder and also employees of the company through the Free Zone where it is registered.

=== Offshore Company ===
A UAE Offshore company registration is a popular method of doing business in the Middle East region. In the UAE there are three offshore jurisdictions: Dubai (Jebel Ali Offshore Company), Ras Al Khaimah, and Ajman. They offer similar services but serve different strategic goals of offshore company registration. The Jebel Ali Offshore Company is an International Business Crown, and holds the only offshore vehicle that is permitted to own or hold real estate in the Emirate of Dubai. JAFZA Offshore operates under the JAFZA Free zone.

The RAK Offshore and the RAK International Company (RAKICC) are International Business Companies. They provide services to foreign investors to register an offshore company in UAE without needing a physical presence in the UAE. RAKICC is also allowed to hold the freehold property in Dubai.

UAE Offshore companies offer the following benefits:

- No Corporate tax
- 100% foreign ownership
- 100% Capital and Profit Repatriation
- UAE Bank Account
- International Invoicing
- Limited Liability Company
- No Tax Information Exchange Agreements (TIEAs)
- Absolute Privacy and Confidentiality
- Ability to maintain multi-currency bank accounts in the UAE
- Virtual office facilities available in the UAE

== Legal Forms of Business ==
The common legal forms of business in Mainland, Free zone and Offshore formation in the UAE are:

- Sole proprietorship
- Civil Company
- Limited Liability Company (LLC)
- Partnership
- Private Share Holding Company
- Public Share Holding Company
- Branch of Foreign Companies/Representative Office
- Branch of GCC companies
- Branch of Free zone company
- Branch of Dubai based companies
- Branch of UAE based companies

Under the law of the UAE, there are five types of business establishments applicable to foreign entities interested in establishing their presence in the UAE. The UAE government has implemented a wide range of economic and administrative policies, which has made the UAE an attractive business destination.

A company can create a permanent establishment, create an entity in any of the UAE free zones, enter into a commercial agency agreement, establish a branch office, or create a civil company (currently possible to establish a company in Dubai, Sharjah and Ajman).

=== Limited Liability Company ===
A Limited Liability Company (LLC) is the most common type of registration in the UAE and is recommended when the purpose of the entity is to make sales within the region.

In accordance with Article (218) of the CCL a Limited Liability Company can be formed by a minimum of 1 (as per Article 8 of the Federal Commercial Company Law of 2015) and a maximum of 50 shareholders whose liability is limited to their shares in the capital of the company. Recent amendments to Article (217) of the CCL that came into force in June 2009 removed the requirement for minimum share capital (previously AED 300,000 in Dubai and AED 150,000 in other Emirates) allowing founders of a limited liability company the freedom to determine the company’s share capital which could be less than the earlier prescribed bottom line.

A LLC must appoint a minimum of one manager and up to a maximum of five managers for the business. Managers must be appointed by a Memorandum of Association or by a management contract, for a fixed term or an unlimited term. Unless the Memorandum of Association states otherwise, the manager has full powers of administration and management of the LLC. LLC is not allowed to practice its activities in the UAE without a Trade License and Commercial Registration Certificate.

=== Branch / Representative Office ===
A branch office has the same legal identity as its parent company and conducts business under the name of its parent company. A branch office may only be engaged in activities similar to those of its parent company but it is not permitted to carry on the business of importing the products of its parent company, a function reserved for local trade agents. In some cases the Branch of a foreign company are required to obtain an additional license from UAE Ministry of Economy.

Representative office, on the other hand, is limited to promoting its parent company’s activities i.e. gathering information and soliciting orders and projects to be performed by the company’s head office.

A UAE national must be appointed as a ‘service agent’ for the branch or representative office.

=== Civil Company ===
A civil company is a business partnership for professionals like doctors, lawyers, engineers and accountants. A civil company is 100% owned by the professional partners (except for an engineering civil company); however, a UAE National Local Service Agent is normally required. A foreign company can be a partner in a civil company, as long as the foreign company is in the same field as the civil company.

== Economic Substance Requirements ==
In 2019, the UAE implemented economic substance requirements for mainland and Free Trade Zone companies engaged in specific "relevant activities" as outlined in the UAE Cabinet of Ministers Resolution No. 57 of 10 August 2020. These activities include banking, insurance, investment fund management, lease-finance, headquarters, shipping, holding company, intellectual property, and distribution and service center businesses.

To comply, companies must demonstrate substantial economic presence within the UAE, including conducting core income-generating activities locally, being directed and managed within the country, and maintaining adequate employees, operating expenditure, and physical assets in the UAE.

=== Reporting for Economic Substance ===
UAE companies must annually notify the competent authority about their relevant activities, income, and financial year details, with a submission deadline of 30 June for the preceding year. This requirement applies to all companies, including those exempt from the economic substance obligations, such as investment funds, certain tax residents outside the UAE, and entities conducting business solely within the UAE.

Additionally, companies subject to these requirements must submit an Economic Substance Report within 12 months of their financial year-end, detailing their relevant activities, income, expenses, assets, employees, and confirming compliance with the economic substance test.

== Complementary Punishments ==
There are several kinds of complementary punishments in UAE corporate law. A complementary punishment is an addition to the consequence that comes with being convicted of the crime, and the type of punishment depends on the severity of the crime. The three main types of complementary punishments are those that permanently affect the ability of the business to stay running, those that temporarily affect their ability to stay running, and those that affect how the business runs.

Complementary punishments that permanently affect the business' ability to stay running often involve the dissolution of the company. The dissolution of a company involves the complete and total shutdown of all operations. The company essentially no longer exists. All operations that were affiliated with the company in any way must be stopped and the company no longer legally exists.

Complementary punishments that temporarily affect the business's ability to function often involve confiscation. Confiscation occurs when the government takes the assets of a business or person. What the government does with it is up to their discretion, though the money is generally dealt with in one of three ways: by getting rid of it altogether, destroying it in some way, or placing it into the treasury.

== See also ==
- Judicial system in the United Arab Emirates
- Legal system of the United Arab Emirates
- LLC company in Dubai
- How to Open a Company in Dubai Free Zone? A Complete Guide RichMan Associate.ae
- "Dubai mainland vs free zone (UAE business setup overview)". Henry Club UAE.
