= Kurur Neelakandan Namboodiripad =

Indian politician

- Constituency: Manaloor

Personal details
- Born: 1 January 1896 Adat, Ambalamkavu, Thrissur city, Kerala
- Died: 31 August 1981 (aged 85) Thrissur city, Kerala
- Party: Kerala Pradesh Congress Committee, Indian National Congress

Kurur Neelakandan Namboodiripad was a freedom fighter and disciple of Mahatma Gandhi. He took part in Quit India Movement, Salt March, Guruvayur Satyagraha, Vaikom Satyagraha and Swadeshi movement.

== Political life ==
Kurur Neelakandan Namboodiripad was born in Adat Kurur Mana in Thrissur District in 1896. He was one of the first few leaders in Kingdom of Cochin and in Thrissur District to form Indian National Congress. In 1920, he met Mahatma Gandhi in Kozhikode and asked for permission to join the Indian independence movement. When Jawaharlal Nehru and Indira Gandhi first came to Thrissur, Kurur was the host. Indira Gandhi later on said that she and her father valued the opinions of Kurur.

He was the President of Thrissur District Congress Committee; Member of All India Congress Committee (1922–32) and Secretary, Kerala Khadi Board. Kurur was one of the founder directors of Mathrubhumi daily. Kurur was one of the early foot soldiers of Khādī in Kerala. On 15 August 1959 Kurur was attacked by a group when he was travelling in a car in Eravakkad. He was brutally beaten and was left to die in the road. But alert citizens found him and shifted to hospital. Kurur also lost his right ear in a lathicharge in Central Prison, Kannur.

== Lokamanayan ==
Namboodiripad with P. W. Sebastian started Lokamanayan newspaper in Thrissur city for creating more awareness of the Indian independence movement. Namboodiripad, was the Editor-in-Chief and Sebastian was the printer and publisher.
