= Ivanuku Thannila Gandam =

2015 Indian film by S. N. Sakthevel

- Directed by: S. N. Sakthevel
- Written by: S. N. Sakthevel
- Produced by: V. Venkatraj
- Starring: Deepak Dinkar; Neha Ratnakaran; Rajendran
- Cinematography: R. Venkatesan
- Edited by: A. L. Ramesh
- Music by: A7
- Release date: 13 March 2015
- Country: India
- Language: Tamil

Ivanuku Thannila Gandam (transl. He Has Bad Luck With Water / He Has Problems With Liquor) is a 2015 Indian Tamil language comedy film written and directed by S. N. Sakthevel in his debut and produced by V. Venkatraj. The film stars Deepak Dinkar and Neha Ratnakaran (making her debut), while Rajendran essays a supporting role. The film released on 13 March 2015.

== Plot ==
Saravana Perumal is a television anchor experiencing hard times in both his professional and personal life. He is being bested at his workplace by a colleague, harassed by a loan shark, and fears that his girlfriend Deepika is having an affair. Saravanan goes to a party with his friends, where he becomes intoxicated. While drunk, he unknowingly tells hitman Mark of his troubles who takes pity on him and offers to kill his competitor at work, the loan shark, and Deepika. When he wakes the following morning, he finds that his colleague and the loan shark are dead, and a call from Mark informs him of their conversation the previous night. Saravanan tries to prevent Mark from killing Deepika. While attempting to murder Deepika, Mark falls from a ledge and dies, without Saravanan knowing his true identity as he was drunk when he met Mark. Towards the end, it is revealed that Mark's targets all died by accident before Mark could kill them. Saravanan is unaware of Mark's death and when he later marries Deepika, he becomes paranoid that every man who meets Deepika is secretly the hitman trying to kill her.

== Cast ==
- Deepak Dinkar as Saravana Perumal "Saravanan"
- Neha Ratnakaran as Deepika
- Rajendran as Mark
- Sentrayan as Milk Pandi
- Elango Kumaravel as James
- Pandiarajan as Thirupathi
- Manobala as Dr. Markandeyan
- M. S. Bhaskar as Ponvandu
- Swaminathan as Kuzhandaivel
- T. M. Karthik as Kasinathan
- Subbu Panchu Arunachalam as Channel CEO
- Yogi Babu as Man in hospital
- Gana Bala
- George Maryan
- Sandy as Maika Mahesh
- Boxer Arumugam as Soodu Baskar
- Telephone Mani as Mani
- V. Venkatraj
- Moses
- Arunachalam
- Easwar

== Production ==
Filming was completed in October 2014.

== Music ==
Ivanuku Thannila Gandam

Soundtrack album by A7
- Genre: Film soundtrack
- Length: 21:04
- Language: Tamil
- Label: Divo
- Producer: A7

The soundtrack was composed by A7, and the audio was officially released online on 2 March 2015.

Track listing
No.	Title	Lyrics	Singer(s)	Length
1.	"Mappilla Mappilla"	Yugabharathi	Vijay Yesudas, Sooraj Santhosh	4:48
2.	"Epavumey Vathadhuda"	Gana Bala	Gana Bala	4:02
3.	"Love Vandha"	Yugabharathi	Hariharasudhan	4:16
4.	"Yaarada"	Kannan & A7	Andrea Jeremiah	3:39
5.	"The Po Mashup"	Mc Sai, Snigdha Chandra	Gana Bala, Mc Sai, A7	4:05
Total length:				21:04

== Release ==
The film released on 13 March 2015. The satellite rights of the film were sold to Polimer.

== Reception ==
Ivanuku Thannila Gandam opened to negative reviews, but they singled out Rajendran as the highlight of the film. Sify rated the film as average. They appreciated Rajendran's comic acting stating "the film belongs to Rajendran". However they felt scenes not involving him showed that the filmmakers "tried too hard to make the film as a laughathon". The soundtrack of the film was described as "passable". Tamilstar reviewer Kumaresun gave the film two out of five stars. He pointed to Rajendran's comic role as "the high point" of the film. However he felt the "movie is amateurish, and ends up nowhere". M. Suganth of The Times of India rated the film two out of five stars and stated "It is a film where amateurishness is passed for attitude, and silliness, and crass dialogues... for comedy".
