= Sukrutham =

- Poster
- Directed by: Hari Kumar
- Written by: M. T. Vasudevan Nair
- Produced by: M. M. Ramachandran
- Starring: Mammootty; Gautami; Shanthi Krishna; Manoj K. Jayan
- Cinematography: Venu
- Edited by: G. Murali
- Music by: Bombay Ravi (songs); Johnson (score)
- Distributed by: Chandrakanth Release
- Release date: 25 December 1994
- Running time: 148 minutes
- Country: India
- Language: Malayalam

Sukrutham (transl. Good deed) is a 1994 Malayalam-language film directed by Hari Kumar and written by M. T. Vasudevan Nair. It stars Mammootty, Shanthi Krishna, Gautami, and Manoj K. Jayan. Bombay Ravi had composed the songs while the background music was provided by Johnson. The film won two national awards/; National Film Award for Best Feature Film in Malayalam and the National Film Award for Best Music Direction.

== Plot summary ==
Ravishankar is a journalist, who is a victim of blood cancer. The knowledge of his disease and the death on its way hugely disappoints him and he loses all his hope in life. He tries to arrange things in and around so that the people he cares for suffer the least due to his death. In an unheard-of gesture, he even pressures his (initially horrified) wife, Malini, to get involved with their friend, Rajendran, so that she won't be alone after Ravi's death. Ravi goes back to his village to spend his last days with his aunt, where his childhood sweetheart and cousin, Durga, who is still unmarried, starts taking care of him.

Meanwhile, a doctor who is a friend of Ravishankar convinces him to undergo holistic treatment at his centre. The centre is driven by a theme that each and every cell in our body has a mind which decides whether the body it belongs to should live or die. The treatment does wonders for Ravi and he is on his way to recovery. The final checkups confirm that his blood count is normal. Ravi is delighted to come back to his life, but everything in his hope and joy of life is squandered when he realises that his death was more awaited than his recovery. Everybody, including the relatives, finds it awkward to move on now that he is going to live rather than die, foiling all earlier plans. Ravi gets a lethal blow when even Durga, who clearly had no worldly motives, confesses that her affection was directed at a dying man, and is not available anymore as he was going to live, and rejects his (borderline romantic) overtures as she clearly doesn't want to become a concubine. Back at his home, he gets his final blow when he realises that his recovery is met adversely by even his wife, since Rajendran has by now started sleeping with her.

Ravi finally composes his own obituary in his office and commits suicide. The final line to the audience is the old message that "death is the ultimate truth, an inevitable part of life" with an addendum that it can even be, "in its own way, a moment to rejoice".

== Cast ==
- Mammootty as Ravishankar
- Shanthi Krishna as Durga (Voice by Bhagyalekshmi)
- Gautami as Malini (Voice by Anandavally)
- Manoj K. Jayan as Rajendran
- Kaviyoor Ponnamma as Cheriyamma
- Shivaji
- Narendra Prasad as Doctor Unni
- Oduvil Unnikrishnan as Cheriyachan
- Kuttyedathi Vilasini as Durga's Mother
- Krishna Kumar as Ajayan
- V. K. Sreeraman as Doctor Rahim
- Krishna Prasad

== Music ==
Bombay Ravi won the National Film Award for Best Music Direction in 1995 along with Parinayam. The background score was composed by Johnson who won the second National Film Award for Best Music Direction in 1995. The lyrics were penned by O. N. V. Kurup.

Song	Singer(s)
"Bandhangale"	K. S. Chithra
"Kadalinnagaadhamaam Neelimayil"	K. J. Yesudas, K. S. Chithra
"Om Poorna"	K. J. Yesudas
"Poroo" (Ennodothunarunna Pularikale)	K. J. Yesudas
"Sahasradalasam"	K. J. Yesudas, Chorus

== Release ==
=== Reception ===
Reviewing the film at the Indian Panorama section of the International Film Festival of India, S. R. Ashok Kumar of The Hindu wrote that "Venu's cinematography and Bombay Ravi's music are plus points for this film". The film got the 1995 National Film Awards for best feature film in Malayalam and best background score.

== Awards ==
- 1994 : Filmfare Award for Best Film - Malayalam - M. M. Ramachandran (Film Producer)
- 1994 : Ramu Kaaryatt Award for Best Actress - Malayalam - Gautami
