= Anandabhairavi (film) =

- Directed by: Jayaraj
- Written by: Mahesh Rajiv
- Produced by: Jayaraj
- Starring: Sai Kumar; Master Devdas; K. P. A. C. Lalitha; Babu Namboothiri; Sreebala; Atlas Ramachandran
- Music by: Veena Parthasarathy
- Release date: 27 April 2007
- Country: India
- Language: Malayalam

Anandabhairavi is a 2007 Indian Malayalam-language film by Jayaraj starring Sai Kumar and Devdas. Sai Kumar won the Kerala State Film Award for second best actor for this film. The film tells the story of a highly talented, but ailing boy, with extraordinary musical talent.

== Plot ==
Jayaraj's Anandabhairavi depicts the life of Vasudeva Panicker, a Kathakali artist, and his son who is a child prodigy.

== Cast ==
Actor	Role
Sai Kumar	Vasudeva Panicker
Devdas	Appu
K. P. A. C. Lalitha	
Babu Namboothiri	
Sreebala	
M. M. Ramachandran	

== Soundtrack ==
Track #	Song	Singer(s)	Duration	Composer	Raga
1	"Vuyyalaloogavayya"	Arjun B. Krishna	04:37	Tyagaraja	Nilambari
2	"Raja Raja Radhite"	Arjun B. Krishna	01:36	Muthiah Bhagavatar	Niroshta
3	"Swarangal"	Arjun B. Krishna	02:31	N/A	N/A
4	"Karuna Cheyvan"	Arjun B. Krishna	06:46	Irayimman Thampi	Sri Ragam
5	"Thulaseedala"	Arjun B. Krishna	02:29	Tyagaraja	Mayamalavagowla
6	"Hantha Hanumane"	Kottakkal Madhu	02:15	Traditional Kathakali music	N/A
7	"Sare Jahan Se"	Arjun B. Krishna	12:52	Ravi Shankar	N/A
8	"Arul Seyya Vendum"	Arjun B. Krishna	01:29	Koteeswara Iyer	Rasikapriya
9	"Jagadananda"	Arjun B. Krishna	08:09	Tyagaraja	Nattai
10	"Samajavaragamana"	Arjun B. Krishna	01:59	Tyagaraja	Hindolam
11	"Ajitha Hare Jaya"	Kottakkal Madhu	05:00	Traditional Kathakali music	Sri Ragam
12	"Kalavati Kamalasana Yuvati"	Arjun B. Krishna	01:08	Muthuswami Dikshitar	Kalavati
13	"Sukhamo Devi"	Kottakkal Madhu	03:32	Traditional Kathakali music	Nattakurinji
