= Elavally =

- village
- Location in Kerala, India Elavally (India)
- Coordinates: 10°34′8.86″N 76°5′22.029″E
- Country: India
- State: Kerala
- District: Thrissur

Area
  - Total: 12 km^{2} (4.6 sq mi)

Population (2011)
  - Total: 12,819
  - Density: 1,100/km^{2} (2,800/sq mi)

Languages
  - Official: Malayalam, English
- Time zone: UTC+5:30 (IST)
- PIN: 680511
- Telephone code: 04885,0487
- Vehicle registration: KL-46
- Nearest city: Chittaattukara at Elavally
- Lok Sabha constituency: Thrissur
- Vidhan Sabha constituency: Manalur
- Climate: hot, humid (Köppen)

Elavally is a village in Thrissur district in the state of Kerala, India. The village is a part of Elavally Grama Panchayat and Mullassery Block Panchayat.

It includes the places of:

- Elavally North, is lying in between Kadavalloor on the north, Parakad on the east, Elavally South on the south and Chittaattukara on the west. It is occupied with an excellent Durga Temple, having self installed growing granite statue.
- Cheloor, is north eastern part of Parakad, is a hilly area. ചേലൂർക്കുന്ന്, alias चेलपुराचलः or the Cheloor hills is occupied with an excellent Ayyappa Temple.
- Parakad, is dominant with rice fields and hilly area.
- Vaaka, is coming south to Cheluur and south-east to Parakad having rice fields and vegetative lands.
- Elavally South, is surrounded by Peruvalloor, Elavally North, Vaka and Pandarakad.
- Pandarakad, is surrounded with Elavally North, Thaamarappilli, Elavally and kadavalloor

Elavally is famous for skilled sculptors. Late ivory sculptor Elavally Naryanan Achari, Wood sculptor Nandakumar Elavally were among them.

Elavally Kavu temple, also known as Elavally Durga Devi Temple and St Sebastian's Church, Chittatukara is located in this village.

Elavally Panchayath was awarded for second best panchayath of Kerala in 2022.

== Demographics ==
As of 2011 India census, Elavally had a population of 12819 with 5969 males and 6850 females.
