= Uchathula Shiva =

2016 Indian film by Jaypee

- Theatrical release poster
- Directed by: Jaypee
- Produced by: Devi Karan
- Starring: Karan; Neha Ratnakaran
- Cinematography: Harmugg
- Edited by: V. J. Sabu Joseph
- Music by: Vidyasagar
- Production company: K Entertainments
- Distributed by: Dream Factory
- Release date: 16 September 2016
- Country: India
- Language: Tamil

Uchathula Shiva (transl. Shiva on top) is a 2016 Indian Tamil-language action film which was directed by Jaypee, starring Karan and Neha Ratnakaran in the leading roles. Featuring music composed by Vidyasagar, the film is produced by Karan's wife, Devi Karan and marks the actor's first home production. The film had a theatrical release on 16 September 2016 to mixed reviews. The film also marked the last featured film for the actor Karan, in leading roles and further retirement from the film industry.

== Plot ==
An easy-going taxi driver named Shiva (Karan) gives out advice on hygiene and the need to be "professional" to an idli vendor on street, thus establishing himself as someone with a humanitarian side, in the very first scene. Further, his conversation with a passenger (G. Gnanasambandam) in a car and the way he talks to his over-concerned mother over phone (Kovai Sarala's voice) brings him closer to the audience. However, within no time, things go haywire when the story actually kicks off. Nila (Neha Ratnakaran) is being chased by a prominent drug dealer named Albert (Aadukalam Naren) in the town, and Shiva comes to her rescue and offers a lift. He tries to contact people who are close to her to ensure safety. Little does he know that he is inviting trouble, as things start going beyond his control. What follows is an unexpected series of incidents.

== Cast ==
- Karan as Shiva
- Neha Ratnakaran as Vidya/Nila
- Aadukalam Naren as Albert
- Ilavarasu as V. Ondipuli
- Ramesh Khanna as Sundarajan
- G. Gnanasambandam as Passenger
- Sangili Murugan as Accused
- Ashwin Raja as Accused
- Madhan Bob
- Poovilangu Mohan
- Mahanadi Shankar
- Yogiram
- Kovai Sarala (voice) as Shiva's mother
- Kanal Kannan as Special appearance

== Production ==
The film became Karan's first home production, with the actor revealing that he chose to do a "light-hearted entertainer" rather than a serious film. Yashmith was initially considered to feature in the flashback portions, but he was replaced by Sriram Karthik.

== Music ==
The music and background score for the film were composed by Vidyasagar and lyrics written by Vairamuthu. Director Dharani made his debut as playback singer with this film.

Track listing
No.	Title	Singer(s)	Length
1.	"Tharu Maru"	Tippu, Dharani, Karan, JP	4:20
2.	"Pesu Pesu"	Balaram, Indulekha Warrier	4:58
3.	"Uchathula Shiva Theme"	Vidyasagar	2:17
4.	"Uchathula Shivan Da"	V. M. Mahalingam	2:17
Total length:			13:12

== Release and reception ==
The film had a theatrical release across Tamil Nadu on 16 September 2016. A critic from The Times of India wrote "a few scenes appear wacky, as the filmmaker seems to be confused about whether to approach these sequences in a serious or comical manner" and "as a result, the audience, too, are left confused".
