= Parampanthali Sree Mahadeva Temple =

Temple in India

- Parampanthali Sree Mahadeva Temple, Mullassery, Thrissur, Kerala

Religion
- Affiliation: Hinduism
- District: Thrissur
- Deity: Shiva
- Festival: Maha Shivaratri

Location
- Location: Mullassery
- State: Kerala
- Country: India
- Interactive map of Parampanthali Sree Mahadeva Temple
- Coordinates: 10.5402°N 76.0906°E

Architecture
- Type: Architecture of Kerala

Specifications
- Temple: One
- Elevation: 50.87 m (167 ft)

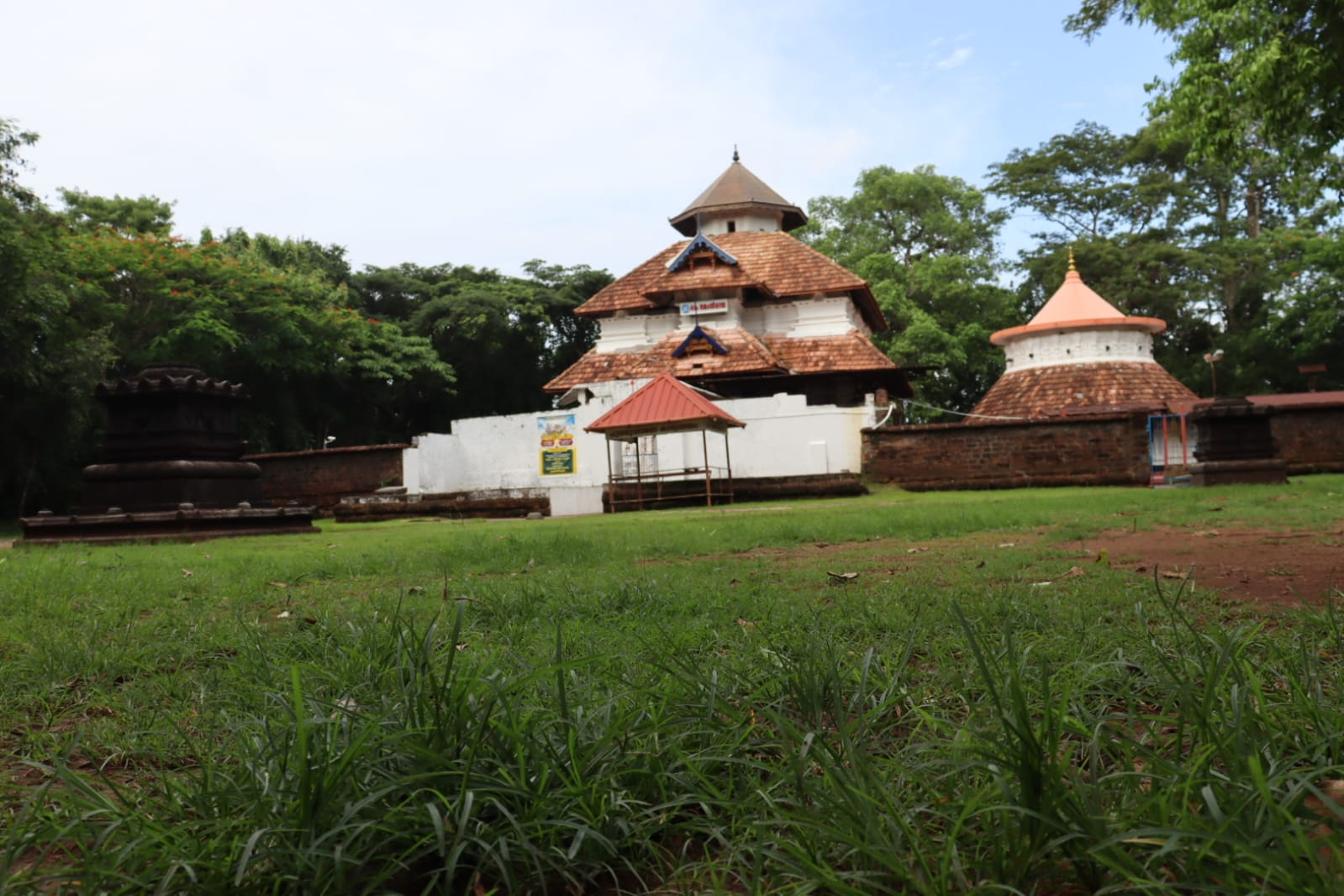
Parambanthaly Shiva Kshethram, Mullassery

Parampanthali Sree Mahadeva Temple is located at Mullassery, Thrissur district of Kerala state, India. It is 5 kilometres (3.1 miles) from National Highway 17, and 20 kilometres from Thrissur city on the way to Guruvayur via Kanjany.

It is believed that this temple is one among the 108 Shiva temples established by Parashurama, an incarnation of Lord Vishnu.

Mahashivratri and Parampanthali Shasti are the famous festivals celebrated in the temple. Various Desam Committees conduct Kavadi Procession accompanied by Nadaswara Melam, Caparisoned elephants and Kettukazhca are some of the major attractions of this festival. Mullassery Center Shasthi Agosha Committee, Kannan Kadu, Elanjikavu, Achante Ambalam, Ayyappakudam, Shaolin Gramam, Swamide Ambalam are some the prominent Desam Committee organizing the festival.
