= Thrissur Public Library =

Public library in Kerala, India

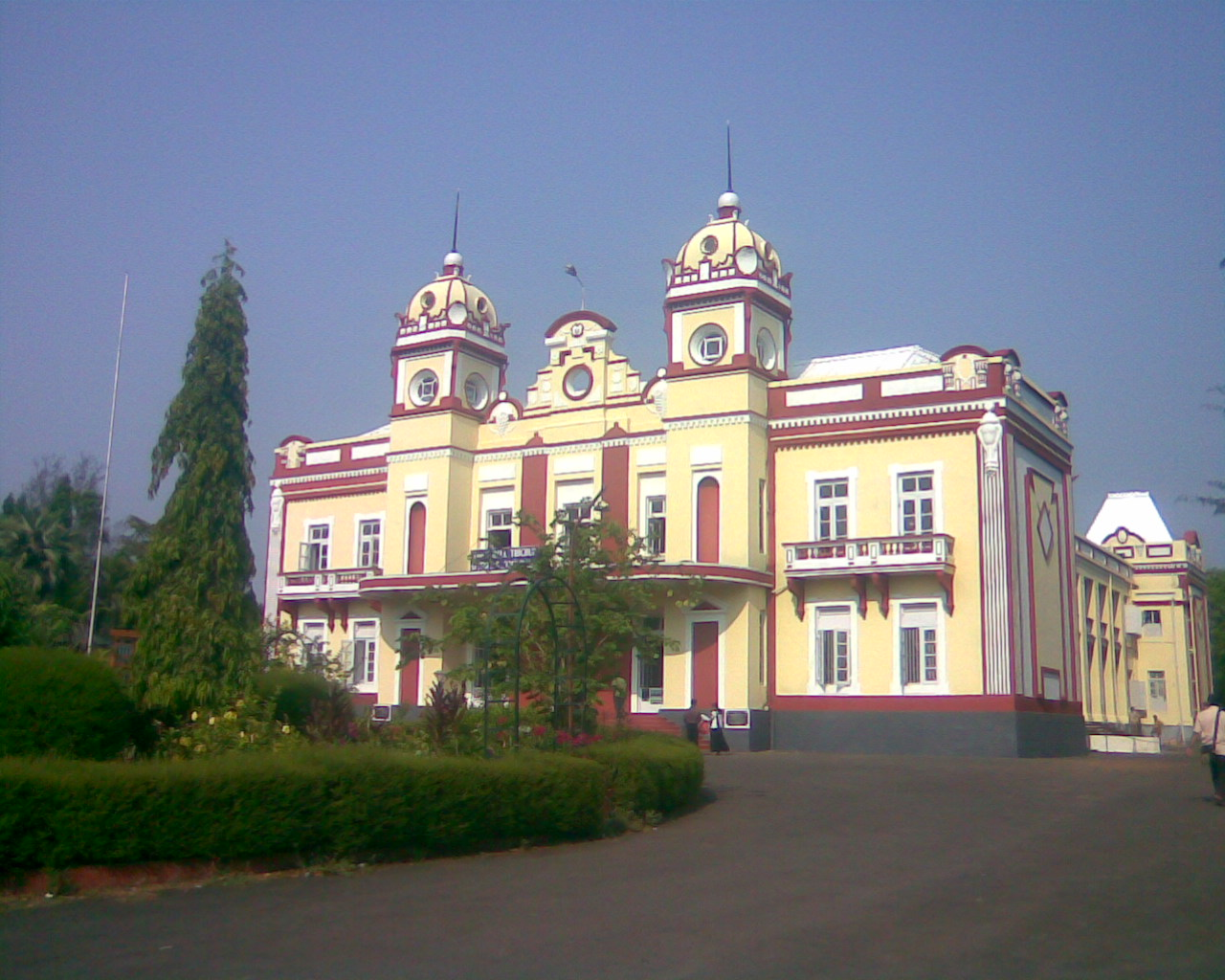
- Front portion of the library
- Location: Thrissur City, Kerala, India
- Type: Public library
- Established: 1872 AD

Collection
- Items collected: Books, journals, newspapers, magazines, maps, prints and manuscripts

Access and use
- Access requirements: Open to anyone with a genuine need to use the collection

Thrissur Public Library is also known as Public Library of Thrissur. It was formed in 1872 in Thrissur city, Kerala, India.

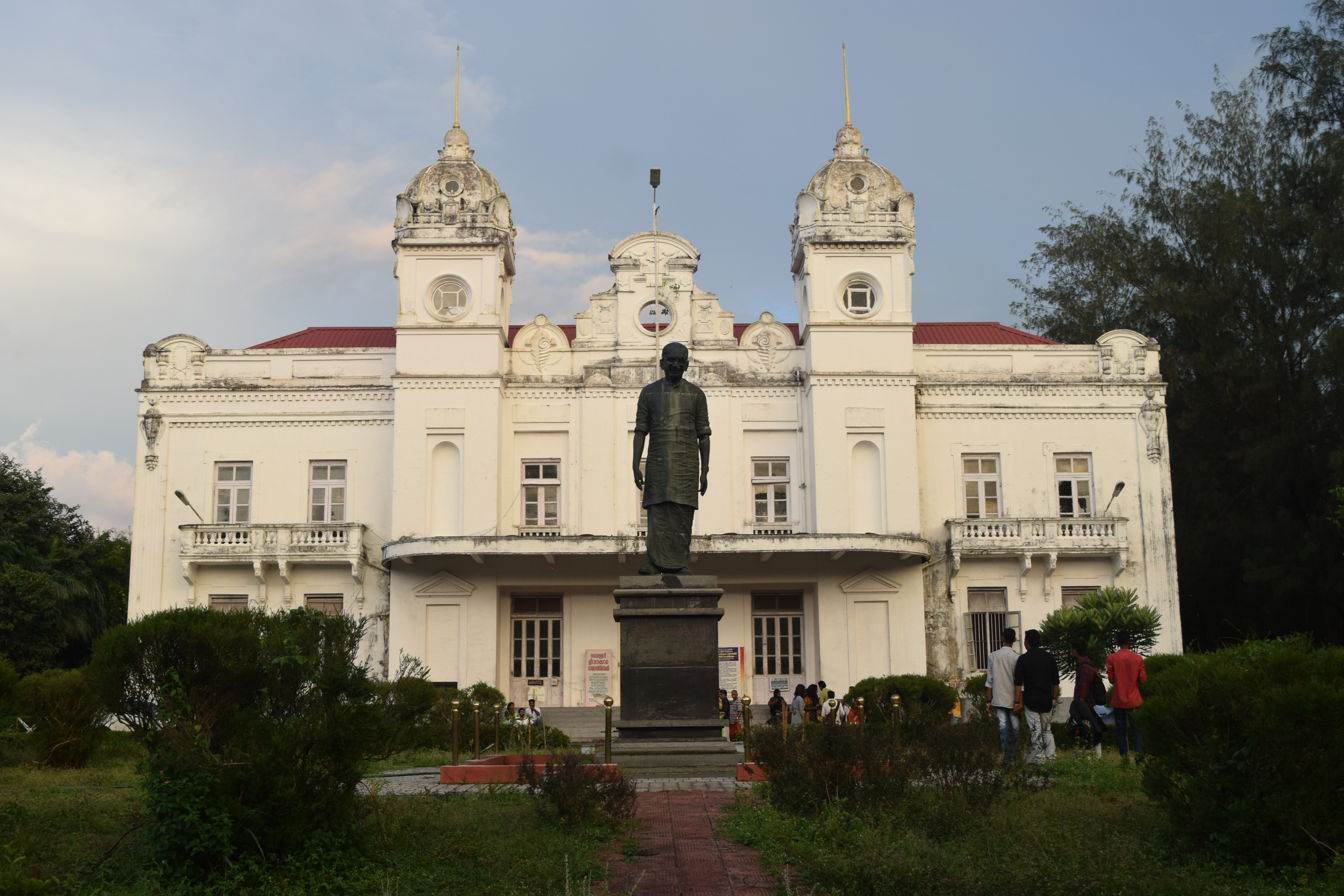

== History ==
The library was started by Diwan A Sankara Iyer in 1872. The library first started functioning at St. Mary's College, Thrissur library. Later it was shifted to the first floor of the Thrissur Town Hall in 1939. The library have 1,200 square feet space. It is the first computerised public library in Kerala in 1996.
