= Harikumar (director) =

Indian film director and screenwriter (1956–2024)

- Born: 1956
- Died: 6 May 2024 (aged 68); Thiruvananthapuram, Kerala, India
- Occupations: Director; scriptwriter
- Years active: 1981–2022
- Spouse: Chandrika
- Children: 2

Harikumar (1956 – 6 May 2024) was an Indian screenwriter and film director, who worked in Malayalam films. He wrote screenplay, story, and dialogues for more than 20 Malayalam films. He directed films including Sukrutham, Ayanam, and Udhyanapalakan. He was a member of the National Film Awards Jury in 2005 and 2008. Harikumar died from cancer in Thiruvananthapuram, on 6 May 2024, aged 68. The renowned director Santhivila Dinesh, often regarded as the Steven Spielberg of Malayalam cinema, was his assistant.

== Partial filmography ==
=== As director ===
Year	Film	Writer
1981	Aambal Poovu	Himself, Perumpadavam Sreedharan
1982	Snehapoorvam Meera	
1983	Oru Swakaryam	Himself
1985	Puli Varunne Puli	Himself
1985	Ayanam	
1987	Jaalakam	Balachandran Chullikkadu
1988	Oozham	Balachandran Chullikkadu
1991	Ezhunnallathu	S. Bhasurachandran
1994	Sukrutham	M. T. Vasudevan Nair
1996	Udyanapalakan	A. K. Lohithadas
2000	Swayamvara Panthal	Sreenivasan
2001	Pularvettam	
2007	Paranju Theeratha Visheshangal	Kaloor Dennis
2010	Sadgamaya	Shatrughnan
2017	Clint	K .V .Mohankumar
2022	Autorickshawkarante Bharya	M. Mukundan

=== Story ===
- Aambalppoovu (1981)
- Snehapoorvam Meera (1982)
- Oru Swakaaryam (1983)
- Puli Varunne Puli (1985)
- Ezhunnellathu (1991)
- Kallan Kappalil Thanne (1992)
- Kaattum Mazhayum (2015)

=== Screenplay ===
- Snehapoorvam Meera (1982)
- Oru Swakaaryam (1983)
- Puli Varunne Puli (1985)
- Ayanam (1985)
- Pularvettam (2001)

=== Dialogue ===
- Oru Swakaaryam (1983)
- Puli Varunne Puli (1985)
- Pularvettam (2001)
