= Thaikkad =

- Census town
- Location in Kerala, India
- Coordinates: 10.600063°N 76.058082°E
- Country: India
- State: Kerala
- District: Thrissur

Population (2001)
  - Total: 7,749

Languages
  - Official: Malayalam, English
- Time zone: UTC+5:30 (IST)

Thaikkad is a census town in Thrissur district in the Indian state of Kerala.

== Demographics ==
As of 2001 India census, Thaikkad had a population of 7749. Males constitute 47% of the population and females 53%. Thaikkad has an average literacy rate of 86%, higher than the national average of 59.5%: male literacy is 86%, and female literacy is 86%. In Thaikkad, 10% of the population is under 6 years of age.
