= Mullassery =

- Village
- Location in Kerala, India Mullassery (India)
- Coordinates: 10°32′0″N 76°5′0″E
- Country: India
- State: Kerala
- District: Thrissur

Government
  - Type: Panchayati raj (India)
  - Body: Mullassery Grama panchayath

Population (2011)
  - Total: 12,165

Languages
  - Official: Malayalam, English
- Time zone: UTC+5:30 (IST)
- PIN: 680509
- Vehicle registration: KL 46-
- Nearest city: Thrissur

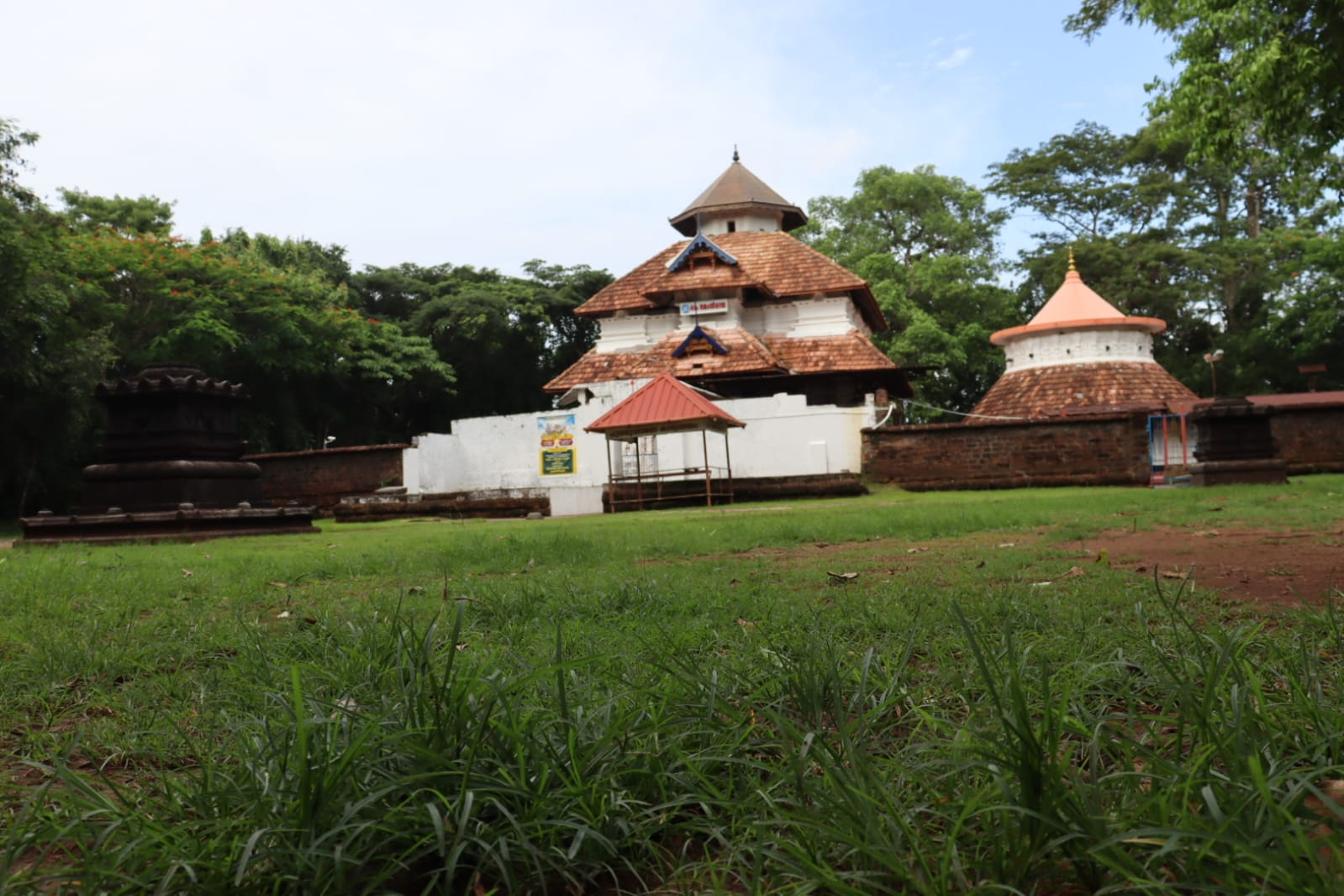
Parambanthally Shiva Kshetram, Mullassery

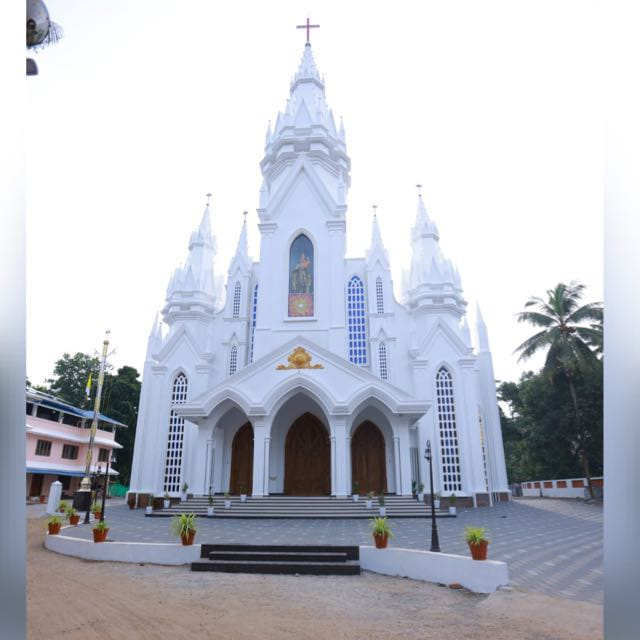
Our Lady of Mount Carmel Church, Mullassery

Mullassery is a village in Thrissur district in the state of Kerala, India. It is located 20 km (12 mi) west of District Headquarters Thrissur and 278 km (173 mi) from the state capital Thiruvanathapuram. It houses Parambanthali Mahadeva temple, Hanuman Kavu, Good Shepherd's Church and Our Lady of Mount Carmel Church (Pudukkad North). The nearest railheads are at Guruvayoor and Thrissur. Nearby airports are Cochin International Airport and Calicut Airport. Mullassery has a wetland ecosystem which is known as Kole lands. These Kole lands are considered rice granaries. Mullassery is an agricultural village however, today majority of youth of this village are UAE expatriates. The Pincode of Mullassery is 680509 and its postal head office located in Mullassery Centre.

== History ==
The name of the village is derived from the words "Mullai and "Cheri". "Mullai" means "Wealth and "Cheri" means "Part of a place". It is said that the combination of these two words made the name of the village as Mullaichery which is now known as Mullassery. The name symbolizes the richness of this agriculturally important land. Mullassery was included in the Kingdom of Cochin. Later it came under the control of Zamorins. The area was conquered by the British as a result of the Treaty with Tipu. During Indian freedom struggle, Kasturba Gandhi, Kamala Devi, Chatobadhya Sadhashirao visited this village. Jawaharlal club was the first club and library established in the village in 1930.

There are many traditional ancient houses located in this village and these houses are known as " Tharavadu"

== Important personalities ==
Mithavadi Krishnan, Indian journalist and social reformer was born in this village.

Murali Cheeroth - chairman, Kerala Lalithakala Academy

Atlas Ramachandran, Indian Jeweller, Film Producer and actor.

Murali Perunelly-Indian Politician

Mohan Sithara-Indian Music

== Festivals ==
Parambanthali Shashti is a famous festival celebrated in the village. Various Desam Committees conduct "Kavadi procession accompanied by Nadaswara melam is the major attractive event of this festival. Mullassery Centre Shashti Agosha Committee, Achante Ambalam, Kannan Kadu, Erinjikavu, Ayyanpankudam, Shaolin gramam, Swamide Ambalm etc. were some the prominent Desam committee organizing this festival.

== Educational institutions near Mullassery ==
Hindu Upper Primary School, Mullassery-The first school of Mullassery

Government Higher Secondary School, Mullassery

Vanivilasm UP School, Padoor

Aleemul Islam Higher Secondary School, Padoor.

Good Shepherd Central School, Mullassery.

== Government amenities ==
Community Health Centre, Mullassey

== Demographics ==
As of 2011 India census, Mullassery had a population of 12165 with 5551 males and 6614 females.

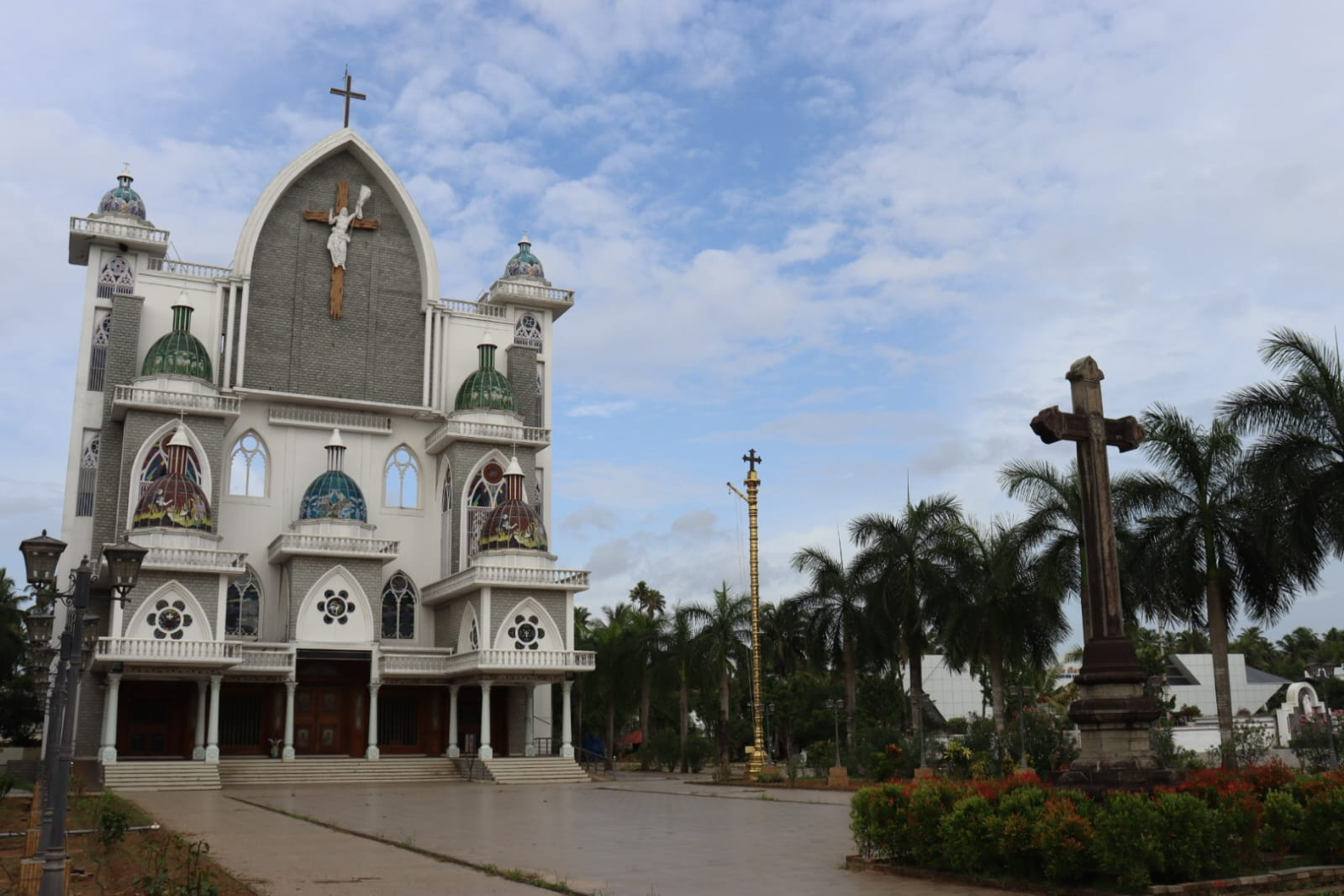
Good Sheperd Church Mullassery
