= Arabikkatha =

- DVD cover
- Directed by: Lal Jose
- Written by: Iqbal Kuttippuram
- Produced by: Hassan Sainullabdeen
- Starring: Sreenivasan; Indrajith Sukumaran; Jayasurya; Atlas Ramachandran
- Cinematography: Manoj Pillai
- Edited by: Ranjan Abraham
- Music by: Bijibal
- Distributed by: Balaji Movies; Sagar Release
- Release date: 5 July 2007
- Running time: 150 minutes
- Country: India
- Language: Malayalam

Arabikkatha (lit. 'Arabian tale') is a 2007 Indian Malayalam-language survival satirical-drama film directed by Lal Jose and written by Ikbal Kuttipuram. The film was a critical and commercial success in India and the United Arab Emirates. It deals with differences within the Communist movement, and was produced against a background of real-life splits in the ruling Communist Party in Kerala state, India. In the film, Mukundan, a hardcore communist, exposes the atrocities of Karunan, a cunning and corrupt politician.

== Plot ==
The film narrates the story of "Cuba" Mukundan. He is a staunch leftist who lives for the movement. Machinations of a corrupt politician, Karunan, who perceives Mukundan as a threat to his political career force Mukundan to take up a job in Dubai. Even in Dubai, he finds that Kunjunni Muthalali who was in league with Karunan, is exploiting the helpless labourers who migrate to the Persian Gulf region, performing menial jobs and physical labor in order to support their families back home. He has always had a soft corner for People's Republic of China as a result of his leftist leanings. When he meets Zhang Chu Min, a Chinese girl, she quickly finds a special place in his heart as she symbolizes China to him. Later, even after realising that she is an anti-communist and is there to make money for the treatment of her boyfriend who fought against the Chinese Government, he gives her his earnings saying a communist never keeps money more than his requirements. Along with the help of his friends Anwar, Maya, Karim and Abbas, Mukundan exposes the machinations of Karunan and Kunjunni Muthalali. Finally, Mukundan returns home to work for the political cause which has been his life and love. The movie depicts Mukundan who lives in rural Kerala being catapulted into Dubai, the gleaming world of commerce and industry that gives employment opportunity to workers from Kerala. Mukundan who finds himself in present society where sticking to any ideology without any compromises is perceived as something of an anachronism.

== Cast ==
- Sreenivasan as Cuba Mukundan, a staunch follower of communism
  - Balu Varghese as Young Mukundan
- Indrajith Sukumaran as Anwar, Mukundan's friend
- Jayasurya as Sidharthan
- Zhang Chu Mi as Shu Min
- Samvrutha Sunil as Maya
- Salim Kumar as Karim
- Sadiq as Abbas, Mukundan's friend
- K. T. C. Abdullah as Abdullah, Karim's father-in-law
- Shivaji Guruvayoor as Karunan, Sidharthan's uncle
- Jagathy Sreekumar as Kunjunni Muthalali
- Nedumudi Venu as Society Gopalan, Mukundan's father and a veteran communist leader
- Suraj Venjaramood as James
- Anil Panachooran as Poet
- Moideen Koya as Vishwam Kathalikkadu
- Atlas Ramachandran as Coat Nambiar
- Kozhikode Narayanan Nair as Ravunni
- Assim Jamal as Labour
- Augustine as Varghese
- Satheesh Menon as Pakistani Supervisor
- Manikandan Pattambi as Ayyappankutty

== Soundtrack ==
Arabikkatha's songs and background score are composed by Bijibal, who made his debut through this film. The lyrics were written by Anil Panachooran, also a debutant. The music album has seven songs:

Track	Song title	Singer(s)
1	"Thirike Njan"	Dr. K. J. Yesudas
2	"Tharakaramalarukal"	Vineeth Sreenivasan, Sujatha Mohan
3	"Thaane Paadum Veene"	Rajeev Kodampally, Soumya Ramakrishnan
4	"Chora Veena"	Anil Panachooran

== Box office ==
The film was both a commercial and a critical success.
