= Kottakkal Madhu =

Indian singer

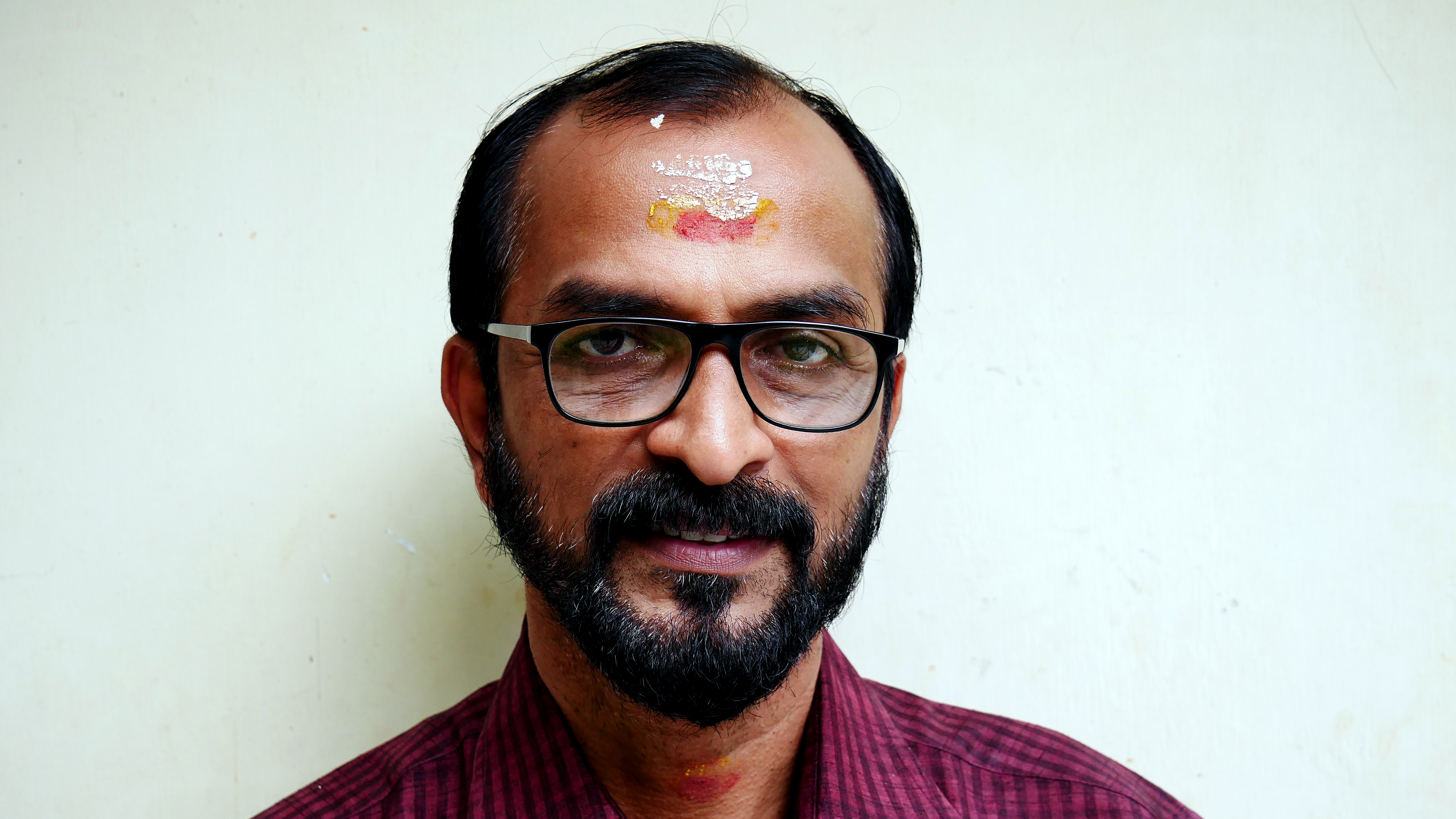
Kottakkal Madhu

Kottakkal Madhu (born 26 October 1968) is a prominent Kathakali Musician, Playback singer and Composer from Kottakkal, Kerala, India who specializes in Kathakali music. He works as kathakali music instructor in PSV Natyasangham(c/o Arya Vaidya Sala, Kottakkal). He received the Kerala Sangeetha Nataka Akademi Award in 2016.
