= Atlas Jewellery =

Indian jewelry company headquartered in Dubai

- Industry: Jewellery
- Founded: 1981; 44 years ago in Kuwait
- Founder: Dr. M. M. Ramachandran
- Headquarters: Dubai, United Arab Emirates
- Areas served: UAE; Oman; Qatar; Bahrain; Saudi Arabia; Kuwait; India
- Key people: Dr. M. M. Ramachandran
- Products: Gold, Diamond, Pearl, Gemstone
- Services: Retail Jewellery
- Owner: Dr. M. M. Ramachandran
- Website: jewellery.atlasera.com

Atlas Jewellery is an Indian owned jewellery retailer headquartered in Dubai, with 41 stores across the Middle East, in the UAE, Oman, Qatar, Bahrain, Saudi Arabia, Kuwait and India. The company's stores have a large range of jewellery in the gold, diamond, pearl, and gemstone categories. Founded by Dr. M. M. Ramachandran in 1981, the first Atlas Jewellery store was established in Kuwait.

== Products ==
Atlas Jewellery stores display a wide range of jewellery in gold, diamond, pearl and gemstones.
