= Thrissur Town Hall =

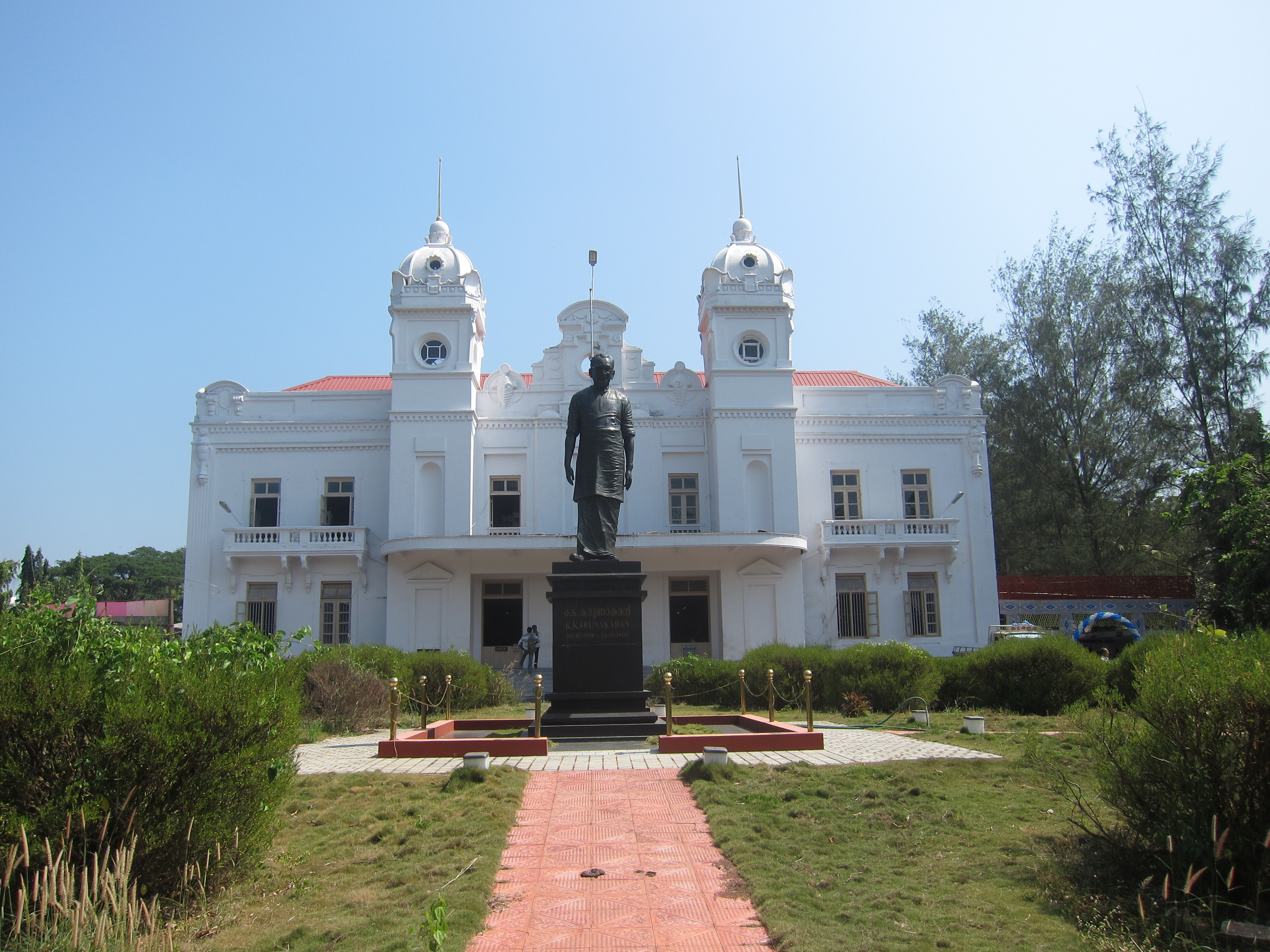
- Imposing structure of Thrissur Town Hall

General information
- Type: Town hall
- Architectural style: Indo-Saracenic
- Location: Thrissur; Kerala; India, Palace Road, Thrissur; Kerala
- Owner: Thrissur Municipal Corporation

Design and construction
- Architect: V.K. Aravindaksha Menon

The Thrissur Town Hall is a museum building situated in Thrissur city, Kerala state, India. It was constructed during the Dewanship of RK Shanmughom Chetti and contains the Archaeological Museum and Picture Gallery, where mural paintings from all parts of the Kerala are copied and exhibited. The must see in this museum is the collection of the old manuscripts, written on palm leaves and called olagrandhangal. The Town Hall was built in honour of the then Emperor of India, King George, for his silver jubilee. The architecture is in the Victorian style with a lawn and garden in front.

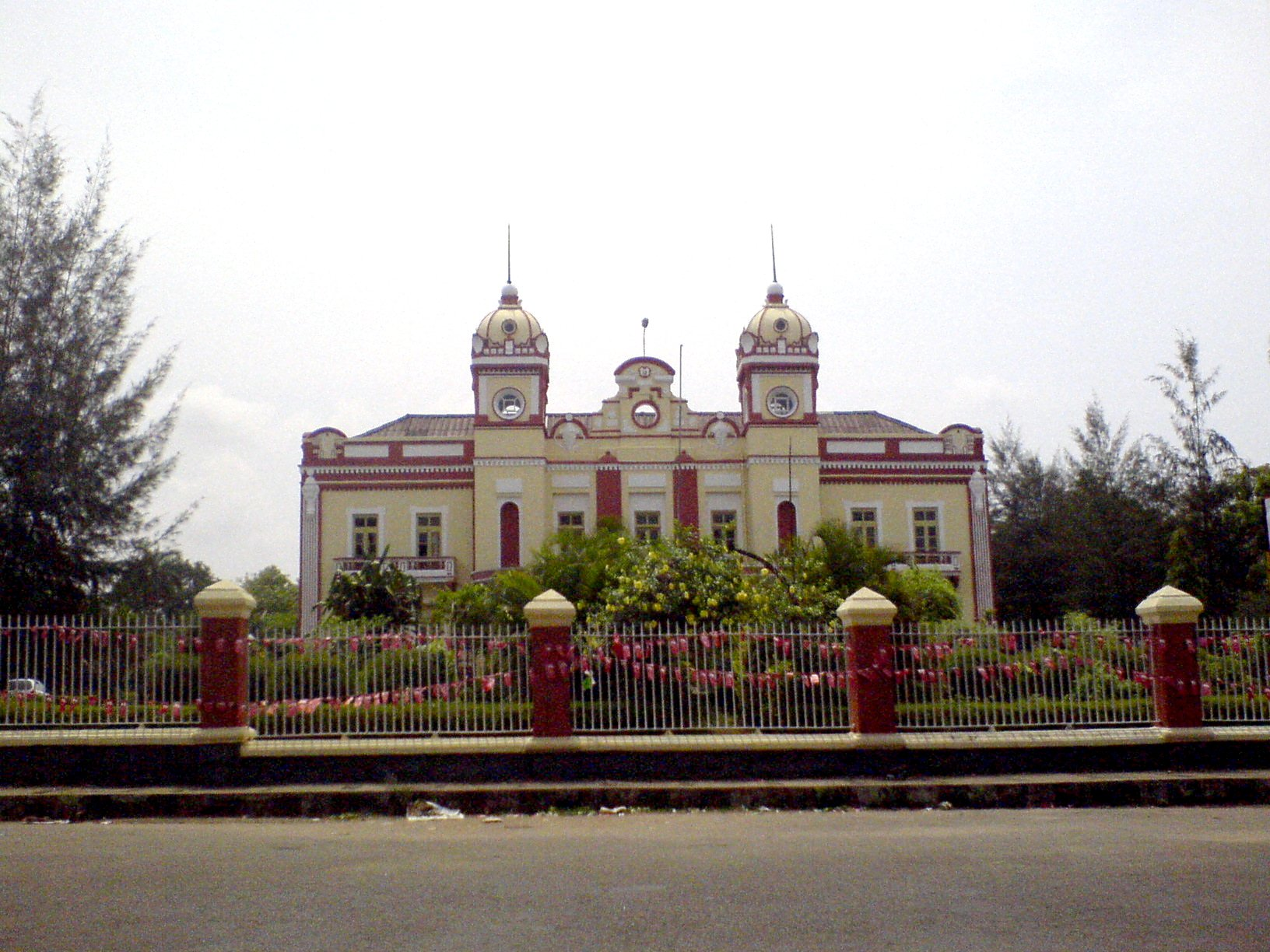
Thrissur Town Hall in 2007
