= Judicial system of the United Arab Emirates =

National judicial system

The judicial system of the United Arab Emirates is divided into federal courts and local courts. The federal justice system is defined in the Constitution of the United Arab Emirates, with the Federal Supreme Court based at Abu Dhabi. As of 2023, only the emirates of Abu Dhabi, Dubai and Ras Al Khaimah have local court systems, while all other emirates use the federal court system for all legal proceedings.

The UAE is a civil law jurisdiction, hence unlike common law jurisdictions, legal proceedings in the UAE do not rely on precedents, although sometimes the judgments of higher courts can be applied by lower courts in cases with similar facts. The emirates of Abu Dhabi and Dubai also have common law courts that adjudicate commercial cases in financial free zones, with both emirates allowing local businesses to opt-in to the jurisdiction of the common law courts for business contracts.

Both local and federal courts have Sharia courts, which have exclusive jurisdiction in matters of Muslim marriage, family law and inheritance matters. Non-Muslims family law, marriage and inheritance are governed by civil law. Since 2020, Article 1 of the Federal Penal Code was amended to state that Islamic Law applies only to retribution and blood money punishments; previously the article stated that "provisions of the Islamic Law shall apply to the crimes of doctrinal punishment, punitive punishment and blood money."

== History ==
Prior to the founding of the UAE in 1971, the Trucial States were known as a protectorate of the British Empire established through a number of treaties. During that period, most disputes were handled by the rulers of the emirates, heads of local tribes, and unofficial judges following customary law. The primary source of law was Islam along with the unwritten social conventions or "urf". Sharia judges specialized in family disputes while customary law judges handled criminal assaults and personal disputes. In the inland Bedouin communities, disputes were usually over livestock and water resources. Disputes in coastal cities were normally related to trade and commercial relations, particularly the pearl trade. After the 1853 truce, disputes pertaining to pearl diving were handled directly by the British political resident in the Persian Gulf.

== Legal system in the Constitution ==
The Constitution of the United Arab Emirates, which came into effect on 2 December 1971, dedicates its entire fifth section for the federal legal system. Article 94 of the Constitution stipulates that "justice is the basis of authority."

== Federal judiciary ==
=== Federal Supreme Court ===
Despite being the highest judicial authority in the UAE, the Federal Supreme Court does not have jurisdiction on local matters in emirates with independent judiciaries. The Federal Judiciary falls under the authority of the Ministry of Justice.

Article 96 of the UAE Constitution reads as follows "The Supreme Court of the Union shall consist of a president and a number of judges, not exceeding five in all, who shall be appointed by decree, issued by the President of the Union after approval by the Supreme Council." The Constitution also divides courts in the country into two types, federal courts and local courts. The president and the members of the Supreme Court can by no means be removed from their offices, except in the following cases: Death, resignation, completion of term or secondment, retirement, permanent disability that prevent a judge from undertaking their duties, disciplinary discharge and finally "appointment to other offices, with their agreement." The judgments of the Emirati Supreme Court cover matters like disputes raising between the emirates, law constitutionality, constitutional interpretation, interrogation of senior federal officials and crimes threatening national interests. Article 101 of the Constitution stipulates that "The judgements of the Supreme Court of the Union shall be final and binding upon all." The first president of the Federal Supreme Court is Judge Abdul Wahab Abdul (incumbent).

=== Federal Courts of Appeal ===
Federal Courts of Appeal are the second tier of the federal judiciary of the United Arab Emirates, and hear appeals from Federal Courts of First Instance. Judgments by federal courts of appeal can only be appealed to the Federal Supreme Court.

=== Federal Courts of First Instance ===
Federal Courts of First Instance consider "cases, authentications and all urgent matters related to disputes among the people as well as the safeguard of their rights, security and safety. It also undertakes forcible judicial execution for execution deed stipulated by law, as well as executions by deputation or reference." These courts are the lowest level of the federal judiciary, courts are divided into criminal, civil and personal status (Sharia) courts, which only handle personal status matters of Muslims. Civil courts accept all legal cases that do not fall under the jurisdiction of the criminal or Sharia courts, including personal status matters of non-Muslims.

== Local court systems ==
Dubai and Ras Al Khaimah have two independent legal systems. For instance, Dubai's court system three stages: The Court of First Instance, the Court of Appeal, and the Court of Cassation. Generally speaking, Dubai and Ras Al Khaimah courts consider local disputes concerning property and domestic disputes. However, it can also enforce foreign judgments, arbitration awards, and awards from other tribunals such as the dispute resolution bodies within the Free Zones & Special Economic Zones. The legal systems of the two emirates are different from one another at several levels, but there is at least one important similarity which that of being independent from the federal system, and from the authority of the federal Supreme Court

The Dubai court system follows Sharia law principles in matters of marriages, divorces, succession and personal status. The Dubai courts have also stated that non-Muslims are "required to respect Sharia law in Dubai."

In 2016, Ras Al Khaimah courts would now accept English language judgements in dispute resolution services, specifically aimed at business and investments in the region. Non-Muslim expats without a will may have their assets passed on to relatives via Sharia law in the UAE however may opt-out of Sharia law in both Dubai and Ras Al Kaimah in the case of succession and wills.

=== Common law courts ===
==== Dubai International Financial Centre Courts ====
The Dubai International Financial Centre (DIFC) Courts are an independent English language common law judiciary, with jurisdiction governing civil and commercial disputes nationally, regionally and worldwide. The Courts began operation in 2006.

Originally, the jurisdiction of the DIFC Courts was limited to the geographical area of the DIFC. In October 2011, the signing of Dubai Law No 16.^{[1]} allowed the DIFC Courts to hear any local or international cases and to resolve commercial disputes with the consent of all parties. The DIFC Courts have no jurisdiction in criminal matters.

==== Abu Dhabi Global Market Courts ====
Established in accordance with Abu Dhabi Law No (4) of 2013, Abu Dhabi Global Market Courts are broadly modelled on the English judicial system. The common law of England, including the principles and rules of equity, apply and form part of the law of the Abu Dhabi Global Market (ADGM). The Regulations for ADGM Courts were also drawn from Scots and Australian Federal law and have been tailored specifically to meet the requirements of ADGM Courts. The direct application of English law makes ADGM the first jurisdiction in the Middle East to adopt a similar approach to that of Singapore and Hong Kong. The ADGM courts have no jurisdiction in criminal matters.

== Alternative dispute resolution ==
Various alternative dispute resolution mechanisms are available for individuals and business in the UAE.

=== Arbitration ===
Arbitration has long been recognized as a dispute resolution mechanism in the region, and one that has been quoted in Islamic religious texts. There has been numerous initiatives in the UAE to build up a strong presence in international commercial arbitration, including the codification of modern arbitration rules in federal and other laws.

==== Dubai International Arbitration Centre (DIAC) ====
First created in 1994 as the "Centre for Commercial Conciliation and Arbitration," the current DIAC is non-profit institution located in the Dubai Chamber of Commerce & Industry (DCCI).

==== DIFC/LCIA Arbitration Centre ====
A joint venture between the Dubai International Financial Centre (DIFC) and the London Court of International Arbitration (LCIA). The arbitration rules for the center are closely modeled on the LCIA's own rules with some modifications.

==== International Islamic Centre for Reconciliation and Arbitration ====
The International Islamic Centre for Reconciliation and Arbitration (IICRA) is an international, independent, non-profit organization supporting the Islamic finance industry. The center settles all financial and commercial disputes that arise between financial or business institutions that choose to apply the provisions of Islamic law, Sharia principles, in resolving disputes that arise between these institutions and their clients or between them and third parties through reconciliation or arbitration.

=== Mediation ===
==== Employment disputes ====
Under the UAE Federal Labor Law, all unresolved employment disputes must be lodged first at the Ministry of Labour office where a settlement is negotiated between employers and workers. If the negotiations fail, either party may take up the matter at court. Since there are no trade unions in the UAE, collective disputes are handled by a special committee composed of the Minister of Labour, a Supreme Court Judge, and one expert. In Dubai, individuals can also refer to a similar service provided by the General Directorate of Residency and Foreigners Affairs as a first step before going to court. In 2015, a new department dedicated to resolving disputes between domestic helpers and sponsors has opened at the General Directorate of Residency and Foreigners Affairs (GDRFA) branch in Al Aweer. The department, a sub-branch of the Follow up on Illegals and Foreigners Sector, handles complaints from domestic helpers in Dubai.

In Dubai, the General Department of Human Rights at Dubai Police receives individual and collective complaints filed by workers against their employers. Complaints would be related to living conditions, wages, and security and safety of labour accommodations and this service is accessible online.

As to civil servants in Dubai, employment complaints can be filed at the office of the Ruler of Dubai, which will attempt to find an agreement between the two parties. If it fails, it will issue the employee a letter addressed to the Dubai courts regarding the complaint. In 2015, the Crown Prince of Dubai has approved the establishment of the Dubai government staff central grievances committee. Members of the committee include a representative from the General Secretariat of the Executive Council of the Emirate of Dubai, the higher legislation committee and the department of human resources.

==== Dubai Courts Centre for Amicable Dispute Resolution ====
Disputes that fall under the jurisdiction of the centre are not registered at the courts unless they are submitted first and a referral is issued. Claims are handled by experienced mediators under the supervision of a judge. Once a settlement is reached, the legally enforceable agreement will be signed by the parties and attested by a judge.

==== Dubai Rental Disputes Center ====
Established pursuant to Local Decree No.26 of 2013, the Rental Disputes Center (RDC) has almost exclusive jurisdiction to settle disputes arising between landlords and tenants in Dubai, as per Dubai Law No.26 of 2007 Regulating Relationship between Landlords and Tenants in the Emirate of Dubai.

==== Family Guidance Department ====
The Family Guidance Department forms an essential part of the family court. All divorce applications are handled first through the department where experienced mediators work to resolve the issues between couples and family members. The department was established in 1998, and provides family counselling, both legal and religious, as well as marriage disputes and disputes surrounding the prevention of marriage of a woman by her guardian.

In 2018, during a television interview lawyer Mukhtar Ghareeb called for an amendment of the law noting that it was "too easy for women to file for divorce."

In 2017, an update was published on the UAE government website stating that all divorce cases in the UAE for Muslim couples would be governed by Sharia law, as well as those in the case where the husband is Muslim and the woman a non-Muslim.

==== Commercial Compliance and Consumer Protection ====
Commercial Compliance and Consumer Protection (CCCP) is part of Dubai's Department of Economic Development. Consumers can approach CCCP by phone, email or fax to lodge their complaints (and soon through dedicated counters at all retail outlets). Upon receiving a complaint, CCCP will contact each person involved to try and find a satisfactory resolution. The aim is to resolve most complaints within 30 days.

==== Dubai Chamber of Commerce ====
Mediation is one of the legal services provided by the Chamber. The value of mediation cases which were settled by the chamber during 2015 reached Dh18.3 million ($4.9 million). The first mediation smart app in the Middle East was announced in 2015.

==== Mediation at DIFC Courts ====
The Small Claims Tribunal (SCT) of the DIFC Courts, features a formal session of mediation as part of its procedure. Approximately 90% of applications before the SCT settle at the "consultation" phase which is a mandatory court–guided mediation session. Only if the parties are unable to reach a settlement will a judge of the DIFC Courts go on to hold a hearing and deliver a Court judgment. SCT proceedings are confidential and parties are not normally legally represented.

== Judicial Studies and legal profession ==
Since early years following its independence, the UAE has tried to build its judicial framework. To achieve this goal, the UAE has worked on several levels. Training people who would be judges, lawyers, clerks and others was one very important level.

=== Institute of Training and Judicial Studies (ITJS) ===
The Institute of Training and Judicial Studies (ITJS) based in Abu Dhabi was established on December 14, 1992. The Cabinet issued Resolution N 14 of 1992 that officially establishes this institute. In 2004, a federal law confirmed the federal status of the institute.

Institute of Training and Judicial Studies (ITJS) undertakes several missions:

- Preparation of and qualification of Sharia and Law Schools to hold
- Organization of courses for judiciary members
- Organization of specialized courses for people like judicial aides and lawyers
- Scientific research
- Training personnel of governmental bodies.

=== Dubai Judicial Institute ===
Dubai Judicial Institute is a public institute established in 1996 by virtue of law No 1 of 1996, amended by law No 27 of 2009. This institute undertakes its missions under the supervision the Cabinet of the Ruler of Dubai.

=== Abu Dhabi Judicial Academy ===
Abu Dhabi Judicial Academy was established under Decision No (16) of 2007 issued by His Highness Sheikh Mansour Bin Zayed Al Nahyan, the Chairman of the Judicial Department, the academy is an institution of higher education and specialized training that trains the Judicial Authority members on all branches of law and judicial majors.

=== Academy of Law (DIFC) ===
The DIFC Dispute Resolution Authority Academy (Academy of Law) was established in 2015 as an independent entity to provide quality services to the UAE legal community. Its core functions include training and regulating lawyers, publishing, hosting events for the legal community, and providing free legal advice for people in need. The academy offers comprehensive training to UAE legal professionals from all backgrounds and levels, from experienced English language Common Law practitioners through to newly qualified lawyers and those currently operating in the Arabic speaking civil system. The training faculty includes senior practicing barristers from Dubai and London with extensive experience of training advocates in England and other jurisdictions.

=== Chartered Institute of Arbitrators (CIArb) ===
Established in 2005, the UAE Branch of CIArb is part of the network of CIArb branches across the world. It offers arbitration related training, education (both in Arabic and English), as well as networking events for legal professionals and arbitrators.

=== Maktoum Bin Mohammed Initiatives for Legal Excellence ===
The Initiatives aim at enhancing the capacities of individuals engaged in the judicial field, and motivating pioneering in legal work. The project consists of a number of programs including the moot court competition, legal scientific research competition, legal scholarships program, program for legal and judicial conferences, and the Dubai International Financial Centre (DIFC) Courts Academy.

== Human rights controversies ==
The UAE judicial system has faced criticism by human rights advocates, including cases where detainees convicted during mass trials linked to political affiliation have been held in prisons arbitrarily beyond the end of their sentences.
