= Manaloor =

Manaloor Manalur
- Town
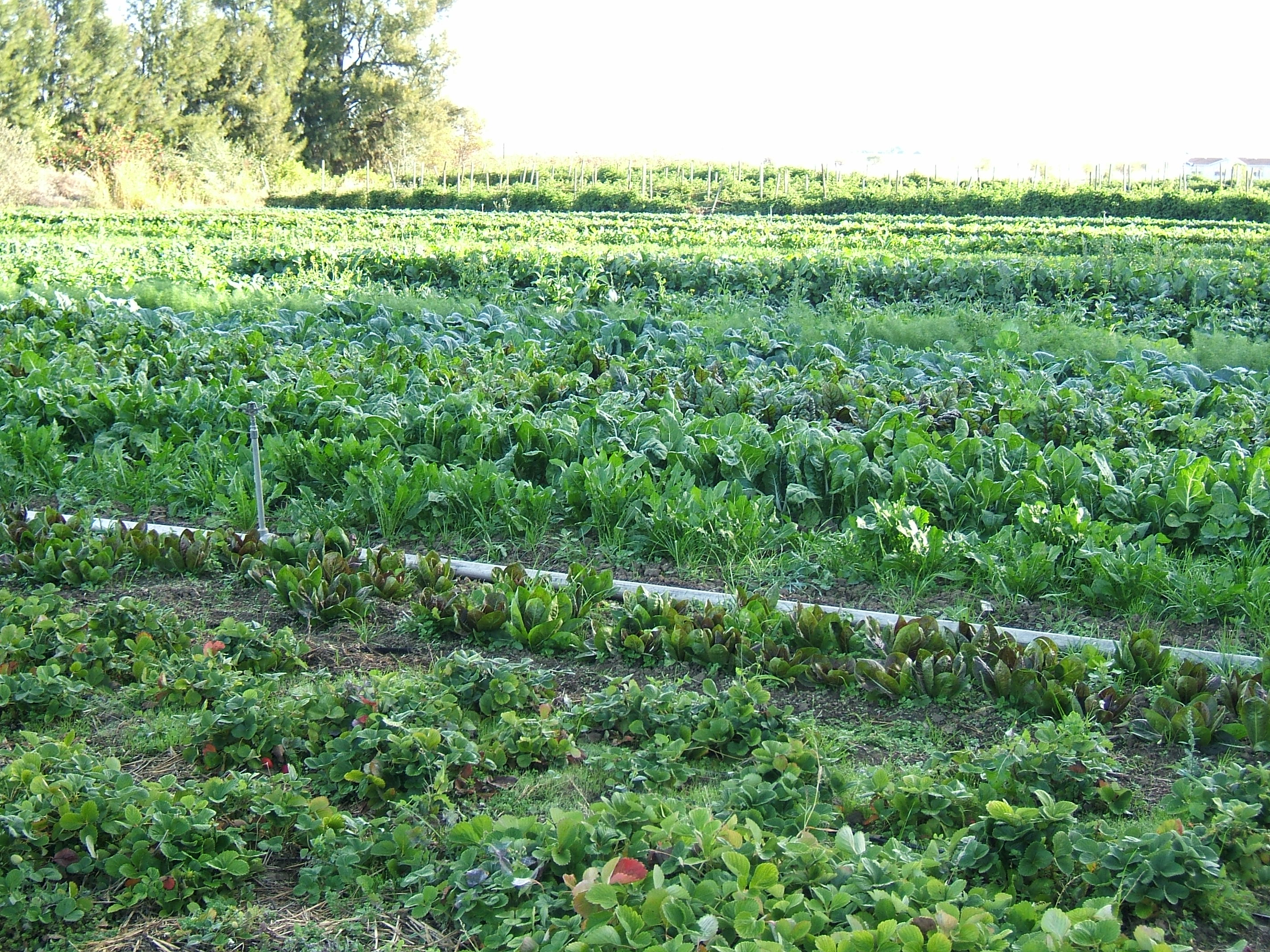
- Organic farming is popular in Manalur
- Interactive map of Manaloor
- Coordinates: 10°29′45″N 76°6′0″E
- Country: India
- State: Kerala
- District: Thrissur

Population (2011)
  - Total: 17,757

Languages
  - Official: Malayalam, English
- Time zone: UTC+5:30 (IST)
- Postal code: 680617
- Vehicle registration: KL-08

Manalur is a small village in Thrissur district of Kerala state, south India. It is one of the constituencies in Thrissur district.

== Demographics ==
As of 2011 India census, Manalur had a population of 17757 with 8442 males and 9315 females.

Social composition in Manaloor (2011)
Community	Percent
Thiyyar	50.19%
Other Hindu	21.88%
Islam	0.50%
Christianity	27.28%

== Manalur- Enamavu Steel Bridge ==
A 117 meters long steel Bridge was constructed across the Enamavu lake connecting Manalur and Enamavu. It was built by Kerala Electrical and Allied Engineering (KEL), and inaugurated on 9 December 2018. 2 crore rupees was allocated from MP, C N Jayadevan's local area development fund year 2015-16.

== Politics ==
Manalur assembly constituency is part of Trichur (Lok Sabha constituency).

== Organic Farming ==
Manalur is famous for organic farming. When the Indian prime minister visited Manalur in 2016, food for 3,000 strong audience was prepared in Manalur using organic farming techniques.

== Famous Personalities ==
VM Sudheeran- Indian Politician

CN Jayadevan-Indian Politician

Late Krishnan Kaniyaparambil-Indian Politician

== Personages ==
Colonel Sreeghanlal P. Raman, First Senior Indian Army officer and pilot from the area, belongs to Manalur panchayat. He commanded 94 Charwa Regiment during Operations Meghdoot, Rakshak and Vijay; also created history in highest battle field in the world, by psycho-conditioning the regiment to engage on multiple fronts and battle field of −40 °C (−40 °F).

Krishnan Kaniyamparambil- An Indian politician and Kerala Minister of Agriculture from 9 June 1997 to 13 May 2001.
