= Keralapuram =

- Town
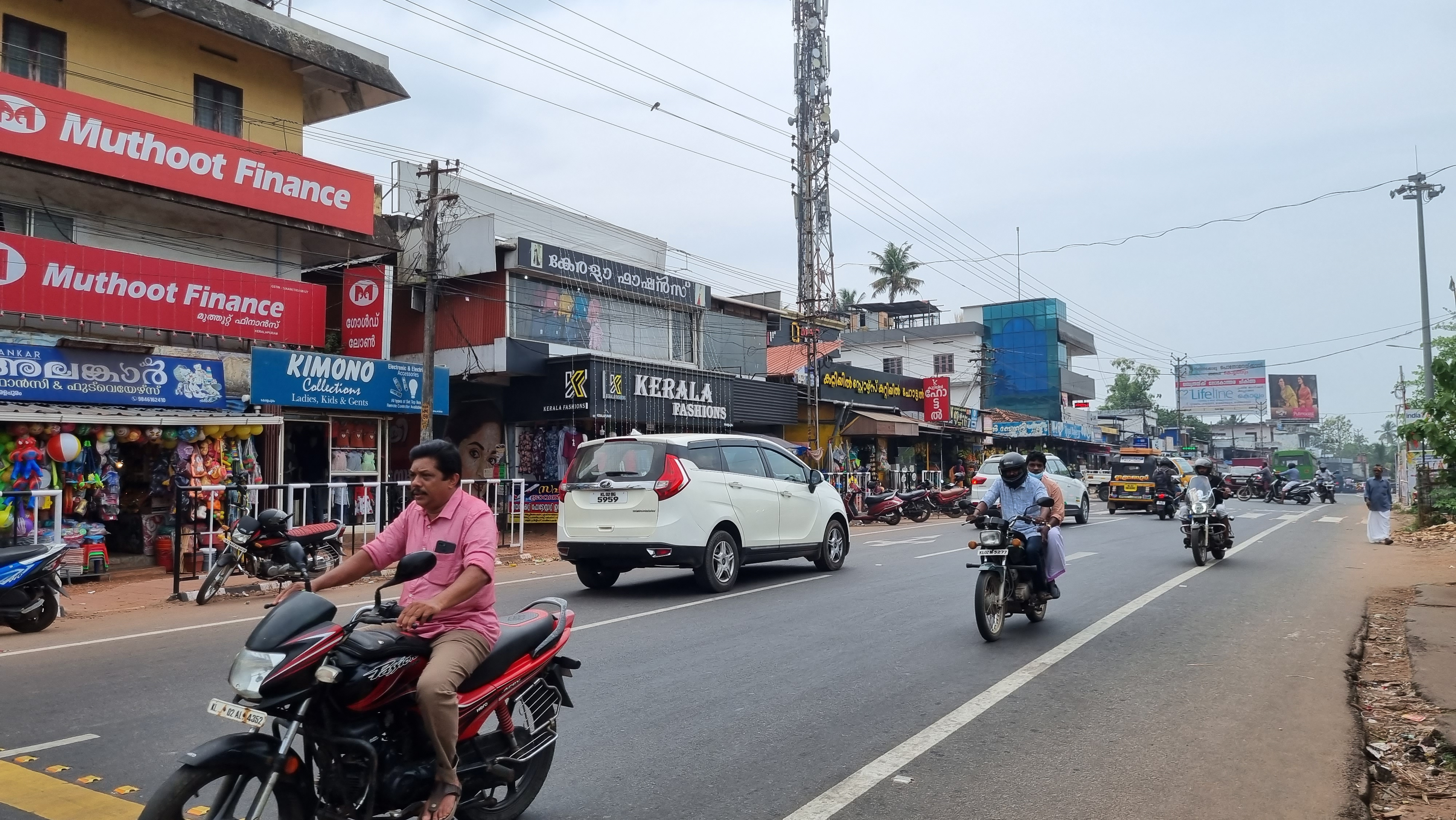
- Keralapuram
- Interactive map of Keralapuram
- Coordinates: 8°56′27″N 76°39′26″E
- Country: India
- State: Kerala
- District: Kollam

Government
  - Type: Panchayath
  - Body: Kottamkara Panchayath, Perinad Panchayath

Languages
  - Official: Malayalam, English
- Time zone: UTC+5:30 (IST)
- PIN: 691014, 691504, 691577,691511
- Telephone code: 0474
- Vehicle registration: KL-02
- State Assembly constituency: Kundara
- Lok Sabha Constituency: Kollam

Keralapuram is a suburban area in Kollam District of Kerala, India and a part of Kollam City. Keralapuram is famous for numerous cashew factories in the region. It is split into Kottamkara Panchayath and Perinad Panchayath by the National Highway. In Kerala state legislative assembly elections, Keralapuram votes for Kundara Assembly constituency.

== History ==
Keralapuram lies in between Kollam City, and the historic trade hub Kundara. The Kundara Proclamation by Velu Thampi Dalawa in the year 1809, which is considered to be one of the first events of freedom fight against the British Raj in Kerala, happened at a distance of 3 kilometers from the present day Keralapuram. First industries in Keralapuram are from the cashew industry boom of Kollam.

Keralapuram has a Government High School that established in the year 1946 and a Public Library established in the year 1948. Another piece of history is the famous restaurant Ezhuthanikada Hotel, started by Meeran Saheb in 1948, which is now a local landmark. The vettu cake of this restaurant is very popular across the state of Kerala and among the Malayali diaspora in Middle East.

== Location ==
Keralapuram is located on Kollam Tirumangalam National Highway at a distance of 10.5 km away from Kollam city and 3 km away from Kundara. A sizeable portion of the town falls on Kottamkara Panchayath on the East side of the highway, and remaining portion on Perinad Panchayath on the west side. It is also the junction where Ayoor Road, Mampuzha Road and Edavattom Road meets NH 744.

Thangal Kunju Musaliar College of Engineering (TKMCE), one of the premiere engineering institutes in Kerala, is located 4.3 kilometres from here at Karicode.

== Education ==
- Keralapuram Government High School
- Peniel Public School
- St. Vincent's ICSE School

== Hospitals ==
- ESIC Hospital
- Devans Hospital
- SSR Hospital

== Banks / financial institutions ==
- State Bank of India, Keralapuram Branch
- Indian Bank, Keralapuram Branch
- KSFE Keralapuram
- Kottamkara Service Cooperative Bank

== Places of worship ==
Keralapuram has numerous places of worship, some of them are listed.

- Varattuchira Temple
- Keralapuram Juma Masjid
- Poojappura Temple
- Puthankulangara Temple
- St. Vincent's Convent and Church

== Major industries ==
Keralapuram had several major cashew factories during the cashew boom of Kollam District. Some of them are still in operation, even though a lot of cashew factories are closed down due to declining cahshew production in Kerala in the 21st century.

== Prominent persons ==
Some of the prominent persons hailing from the area include

- J. Mercykutty Amma, Former Minister for Fisheries, Harbour Engineering & Cashew Industries
- Kainakary Thankaraj, Prominent movie actor, play director and play actor.
- Keralapuram Kalam, Prominent play director and actor. Two of his dramas became movies.

== See also ==
- Keralapura, Karnataka state.
- Keralapuram in Diglipur Tehsil of Andaman and Nicobar Islands
