= Vellimon =

Village in Kerala, India

Vellimon is a village situated in Perinad panchayath of Kollam district in Kerala, India. It is situated around 13 km away from district headquarters. Vellimon is a peninsular landmass of laterite soil that is protruding into Ashtamudi lake the peninsula is having a 20 metre high nearly continuous cliff facing backwaters. Farming, fishing and coir manufacturing are major activity in Vellimon. Chief cropping in the area is coconut. The population is overwhelmingly Hindus and there is visible lack of entrepreneurship and organised activities in the area. There were two resorts that came up in Vellimon namely Snehatheeram and Cambay Palm Lagoon. Due to lack of co-operation and anti social activities from local communities both were forced to shut down. Cambay Palm Lagoon was situated in the scenic laterite cliff that overlooks Munroe Island this resort is currently vandalised by miscreants.

The major institution in the area is The Institute of Fashion Technology Kerala.

== History ==
Vellimon is having a place in history because of the legend of Vellimon Kottaram temple. Today nobody will find a Kottaram or Palace in Vellimon despite people referring to a place in Vellimon as Kottaram. In Unnuneeli Sandesam there is mentioning about Vellimon. The place is referred to as Murithitta in the work. This was confirmed by oriental historian Late Mr. K. Raghavan Pillai.

== Politics ==
Vellimon is part of Kundara legislative assembly constituencies in the district of Kollam. P. C. Vishnunadh is the current elected member from Kundara constituency Vellimon is part of Kollam Lok Sabha Constituency. Vellimon area has strong presence of CPIM.

== Transport ==
Kundara is the nearest railway station which is 6.5 km away.

Major transportation is road ways. Public transportation is handled by Kerala State Road Transport Corporation and Private buses. KSRTC connects Vellimon with Kollam and Trivandrum. Private buses connects Vellimon with Kotiyam, Kundara, Anchalummodu and Kollam.

There are boat jetties in Vellimon but no formal boat services. There is a countryboat (kadathuvellam) between Vellimon and Perumon on demand.

The nearest airport is Trivandrum International Airport.
