= Perinad Mutiny =

The Perinad Mutiny was a riot against upper castes in Perinad, Kollam district, in October 1915. The Perinad Riot is seen as the beginning of the Kallamaala Samaram.

== History ==
Women belonging to the untouchable caste were not allowed to cover their breasts. Insteads, they had to wear crude 'stones and necklaces' (kalla and maala). To protest against this and to demand the freedom to abandon the stones and necklaces and wear garments with dignity, a meeting was held at Cherumoodu, Perinad on Sunday, October 24, 1915. Thousands of Pulaya men and women attended the meeting. Gopala Dasan was the chairman of the meeting. During the meeting, one of the leaders was beaten with an iron rod by the upper castes and confronted by the Pulayas who were standing nearby, which led to conflict and riots. Fearing violence, the untouchable castes fled their homes and villages in droves.

Since it was one of the struggles that started in the year 1090, this too can be included in the group of 'Ninety-Year Uprisings'. Then, to end the rebellion peacefully, Ayyankali organized another meeting at the Kollam Peerangi Maidan on 19 December 1915, and at the meeting, thousands of women broke the primitive 'stone and necklace' they were wearing and declared their freedom to wear outer garments. This is known as the Kallamaala Samaram.
