= Kundara Assembly constituency =

Constituency of the Kerala legislative assembly in India

Kundara
- Constituency No. 123 for the Kerala Legislative Assembly
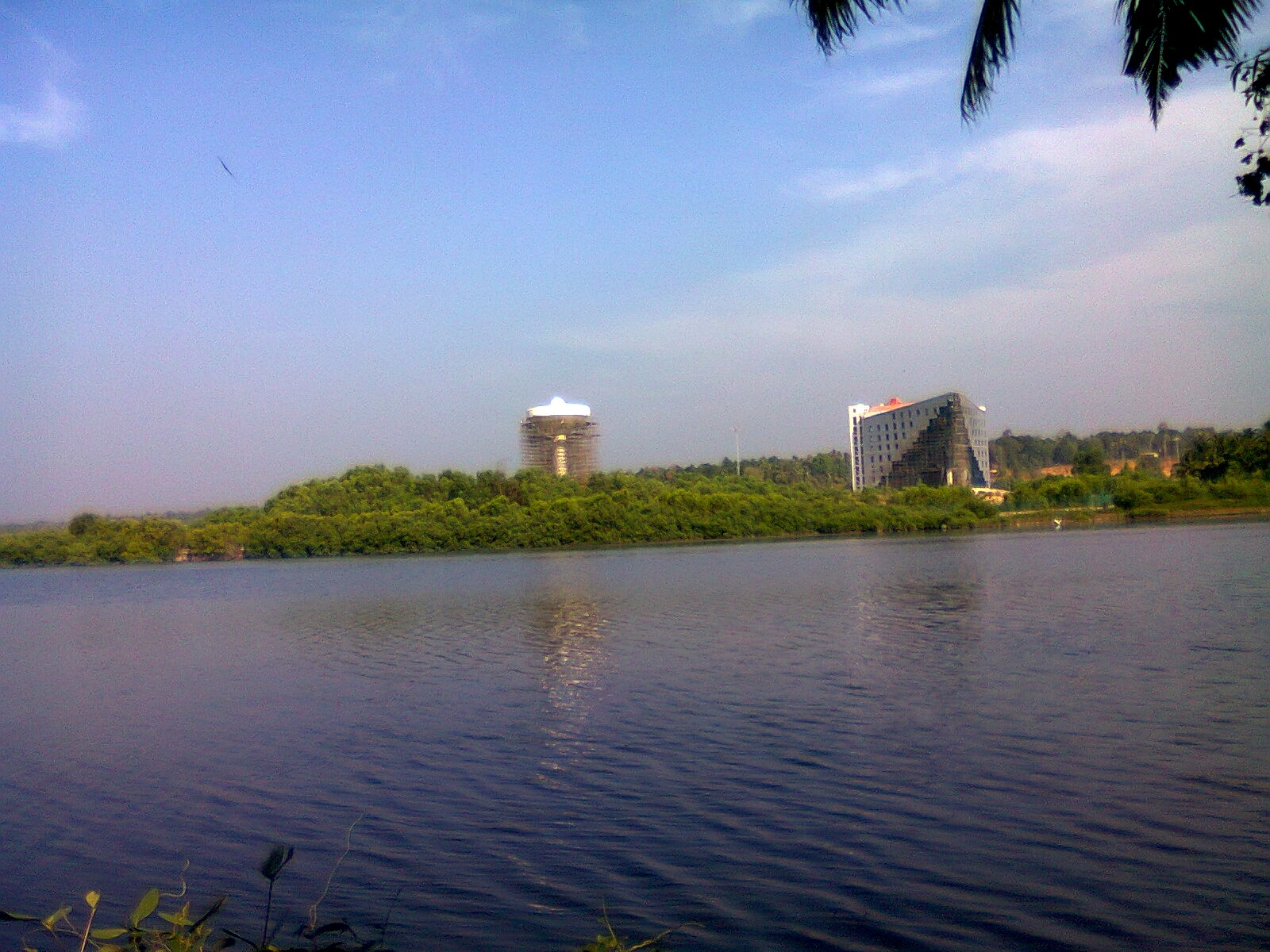
- Kollam Technopark in Kundara

Constituency details
- Country: India
- Region: South India
- State: Kerala
- District: Kollam
- Established: 1967
- Total electors: 2,00,163 (2016)
- Reservation: None

Member of Legislative Assembly
- 16th Kerala Legislative Assembly
- Incumbent P. C. Vishnunath
- Party: INC
- Alliance: UDF
- Elected year: 2026

Kundara is a legislative assembly constituency in Kollam district of Kerala, India. It is one among the 11 assembly constituencies in Kollam district. As of the 2026 Assembly elections, the current MLA is P. C. Vishnunath of the INC.

== History ==
The constituency was previously named Perinad Assembly constituency. In 1957, it was dissolved and Thrikkadavoor Assembly constituency was established. During the election of 1960, Thrikkadavur was a two-member constituency. In 1967, Kundara Assembly constituency was formed by dissolving Thrikkadavur. After the general assembly election held in 1967, P. K. Sukumaran of CPI(M) became the first elected member from Kundara Assembly constituency.

Kadavoor Sivadasan and J. Mercykutty Amma were ministers in the state cabinet while representing the constituency.

== Structure ==
As per the recent changes on Assembly constituency delimitations, Kundara Assembly constituency consists of seven panchayaths from Kollam taluk including Elampalloor, Kottamkara, Kundara, Nedumpana, Perayam, Perinad and Thrikkovilvattom.

In 2021, 47.8% of the voters were males and 52.2% females. The Scheduled Caste voters comprise 13.45% of the vote base.

== Major institutions in the constituency ==
- Railway stations: 4 (Kundara, Kundara East, Perinad, Chandanattop)
- Medical college hospital: 1 (Azeezia Medical College, Meeyannoor)
- Government hospitals: 1 (Govt. Taluk Hospital, Kundara)
- Technopark, Kollam

== Members of the Legislative Assembly ==
Election	Niyama Sabha	Member	Party	Tenure
1967	3rd	Dr. P. K. Sukumaran	Communist Party of India	1967–1970
1970	4th	A. A. Rahim	Indian National Congress	1970–1977
1977	5th	A. A. Rahim	Indian National Congress	1977–1980
1980	6th	V. V. Joseph	Communist Party of India	1980–1982
1982	7th	Thoppil Ravi	Indian National Congress	1982–1987
1987	8th	J. Mercykutty Amma	Communist Party of India	1987–1991
1991	9th	Alphonsa John	Indian National Congress	1991–1996
1996	10th	J. Mercykutty Amma	Communist Party of India	1996–2001
2001	11th	Kadavoor Sivadasan	Indian National Congress	2001–2006
2006	12th	M. A. Baby	Communist Party of India	2006–2011
2011	13th	M. A. Baby	Communist Party of India	2011–2016
2016	14th	J. Mercykutty Amma	Communist Party of India	2016 - 2021
2021	15th	P. C. Vishnunadh	Indian National Congress	2021 – 2026
2026	16th	P. C. Vishnunadh	Indian National Congress	2026 – present

== Election results ==
Percentage change (±%) denotes the change in the number of votes from the immediate previous election.

=== 2026 ===
2026 Kerala Legislative Assembly election: Kundara
Party	Candidate	Votes	%	±%
INC	P. C. Vishnunadh	87,862	53.44	▲4.59
CPI(M)	S L Sajikumar	55,298	33.63	▼12.33
BJP	Dr. Robin Radhakrishnan	18,996	11.55	▲7.65
BSP	Lathika Balakrishnan	572	0.35	
SUCI(C)	Rahul R	269	0.16	▼0.13
NOTA	None of the Above	695	0.42	▼.03
Independent	Riyas Kannanalloor	722	0.44	
Margin of victory		32,564	19.81	▲16.92
Turnout		1,64,414		
INC hold		Swing		

=== 2021 ===
There were 2,05,947 registered voters in the constituency for the 2021 Kerala Legislative Assembly election.

2021 Kerala Legislative Assembly election: Kundara
Party	Candidate	Votes	%	±%
INC	P. C. Vishnunadh	76,405	48.85	▲17.0
CPI(M)	J. Mercykutty Amma	71,882	45.96	▼5.85
BDJS	Vanaja Vidhyadharan	6,100	3.9	−
RJD	Vinod Bahuleyan	172	0.11	−
DSJP	Shiju M Varghese	186	0.12	−
Anna DHRM	Sibu Karamcodu	229	0.15	−
NOTA	None of the above	710	0.45	
Independent	Santhosh Adooran	260	0.17	
SUCI(C)	R. Rahul	457	0.29	▲0.08
Margin of victory		4,523	2.89	▼17.07
Turnout		1,56,401	75.94	▼0.28
INC gain from CPI(M)		Swing		

=== 2016 ===
There were 2,00,163 registered voters in the constituency for the 2016 Kerala Assembly election.

2016 Kerala Legislative Assembly election: Kundara
Party	Candidate	Votes	%	±%
CPI(M)	J. Mercykutty Amma	79,047	51.81	▼0.67
INC	Rajmohan Unnithan	48,587	31.85	▼9.07
BJP	M. S. Shyam Kumar	20,257	13.28	▲8.60
SDPI	Sharafath Mallam	1,325	0.87	
PDP	Kabeer Kutty I. Puthezham	1,132	0.74	−
BSP	S. M. Jaber	698	0.46	▼0.18
NOTA	None of the above	687	0.45	
Independent	Vijayakumar	485	0.32	
SUCI(C)	V. Anthony	340	0.22	▼0.21
Margin of victory		30,460	19.96	▲9.73
Turnout		1,52,558	76.22	▲4.75
CPI(M) hold		Swing	▼0.67	

=== 2011 ===
There were 1,78,990 registered voters in the constituency for the 2011 election.

2011 Kerala Legislative Assembly election: Kundara
Party	Candidate	Votes	%	±%
CPI(M)	M. A. Baby	67,135	52.48	
INC	P. Jermias	52,342	40.92	
BJP	Vellimon Dileep	5,990	4.68	
Independent	Sandhya Pallimon	957	0.75	
BSP	Suseela Mohan	947	0.74	
SUCI(C)	Anthony Vincent	553	0.43	
Margin of victory		14,703	11.56	
Turnout		1,27,924	71.47	
CPI(M) hold		Swing		

=== 2006 ===
2006 Kerala Legislative Assembly election: Kundara
Party	Candidate	Votes	%	±%
CPI(M)	M. A. Baby	50,320	55.00	
INC	Kadavoor Sivadasan	35,451	38.75	
BJP	Kallada Sunilkumar	3,263	3.56	
Margin of victory		14,869	16.25	
Turnout		91,476		
CPI(M) gain from INC		Swing		

=== 2001 ===
There were 1,39,675 registered voters in the constituency for the 2001 election.

2001 Kerala Legislative Assembly election: Kundara
Party	Candidate	Votes	%	±%
INC	Kadavoor Sivadasan	50,875	51.60	
CPI(M)	J. Mercykutty Amma	46,408	47.07	
Margin of victory		4,467	4.53	
Turnout		98,589	70.61	
INC gain from CPI(M)		Swing		

=== 1996 ===
There were 1,30,808 registered voters in the constituency for the 1996 election.

1996 Kerala Legislative Assembly election: Kundara
Party	Candidate	Votes	%	±%
CPI(M)	J. Mercykutty Amma	46,322	50.41	
INC	Alphonsa John	39,846	43.37	
Margin of victory		6,476	7.04	
Turnout		91,883	71.78	
CPI(M) gain from INC		Swing		

=== 1991 ===
There were 1,24,255 registered voters in the constituency for the 1991 election.

1991 Kerala Legislative Assembly election: Kundara
Party	Candidate	Votes	%	±%
INC	Alphonsa John	46,447	49.22	
CPI(M)	J. Mercykutty Amma	45,075	47.77	
BJP	C Rajendran	2,036	2.16	
Margin of victory		1,372	1.45	
Turnout		94,358	76.88	
INC gain from CPI(M)		Swing		
