= Kerala Film Critics Association Awards 2020 =

Annual Indian film awards ceremony

The 44th Kerala Film Critics Association Awards, recognising excellence in Malayalam-language films released in 2020, were announced in September 2021.

== Winners ==
=== Main awards ===
- Best Film: The Great Indian Kitchen
- Best Actor: Prithviraj Sukumaran and Biju Menon - Ayyappanum Koshiyum
- Best Actress: Surabhi Lakshmi - Jwalamukhi and Samyuktha Menon - Aanum Pennum, Vellam, Wolf
- Best Director: Sidhartha Siva - Ennivar
- Second Best Film: Vellam
- Second Best Director: Prajesh Sen - Vellam
- Best Supporting Actor: Sudheesh - Ennivar
- Best Supporting Actress: Mamitha Baiju - Kho-Kho
- Best Child Artiste Male: Master Sidhartha - Bonamy
- Best Child Artiste Female: Baby Krishna Sree - Kanthi
- Best Screenplay: Sachy - Ayyappanum Koshiyum
- Best Music Director: M. Jayachandran - Sufiyum Sujatayum
- Best Lyricist: Engandiyoor Chandrasekharan - Randam Naal
- Best Male Playback Singer: P. K. Sunilkumar - Sheriyathu from the movie Perfume
- Best Female Playback Singer: K. S. Chithra - Neelavanam from the movie Perfume
- Best Cinematographer: Amal Neerad - Trance
- Best Film Editor: Naufal Abdullah - Sameer
- Best Sound Designer: Resul Pookutty - Trance
- Best Art Director: Deepu Joseph - Sufiyum Sujatayum
- Best Makeup Artist: Sudhi Surendran - Ek Din
- Best Costumer: Mashar Hamsa - Trance
- Best Popular Film: Sufiyum Sujatayum
- Best Biopic Film: Visudha Chavara Achan
- Best Children's Film: Bonamy
- Best Ecological Film: Orilathanalil
- Best Performing Artist Film: Pacha Thappu and Uriyattu
- Best Sanskrit Film: Bhagavaddajjukam
- Best Debutant Actor: Anand Roshan - Sameer
- Best Debutant Actress: Afsana - Velutha Madhuram
- Best Debutant Director: Viyaan Vishnu - Ek Din

=== Special Jury Awards ===
- Best Director: Zeenath - Randu Naal and Jinoy Jebit - Kozhipporu
- Best Lyricist: Anilkumar - Leika
- Socially Relevant Best Film: Kho-Kho, Sameer and Article-21

=== Honorary Awards ===
- Chalachitra Ratnam Award: K. G. George
- Ruby Jubilee Award: Harikumar
- Chalachitra Prathibha Award: Mamukkoya, Sai Kumar, Bindu Panicker
