= Palpu Pushpangadan =

Indian botanist (1944–2025)

- Born: 23 January 1944; Prakkulam, Kollam, Kerala, India
- Died: 19 December 2025 (aged 81); Thiruvananthapuram, Kerala, India
- Citizenship: India
- Known for: Development of Jeevani drug
- Awards: Padma Shri; Borlaug Award; Dingra Memorial Award; John W. Harshberger Medal; UN-Equator Initiative Prize; Ayurved Gaurav Award; Dr. A P J Abdul Kalam Memorial -NABS -Life time achievement Award
- Scientific career
- Fields: Botany
- Workplaces: Tropical Botanical Garden and Research Institute; National Botanical Research Institute; Rajiv Gandhi Centre for Biotechnology

Palpu Pushpangadan (23 January 1944 – 19 December 2025) was an Indian ethnobiologist and botanist, who was a director of the National Botanical Research Institute (NBRI), Lucknow. He was also the director of the Tropical Botanical Garden and Research Institute (TBGRI), Palode, Kerala., Rajiv Gandhi Centre for Biotechnology (RGCB), Thiruvananthapuram and Central Institute for Medicinal and Aromatic Plants (CIMAP), Lucknow.

A Fellow of the National Academy of Sciences, India and National Academy of Agricultural Sciences, He was known for the development of Jeevani, a formulation developed from the medicinal plant, Arogyapacha (Trichopus zeylanicus), which was found to enhance immunity in humans and the 'TBGRI-Kani Model' of Benefit sharing. He received the Padmashri Award from the Government of India in 2010.

== Life and career ==
Born on 23 January 1944 at Prakkulam in Kollam district in Travancore, Pushpangadan was known for his contribution to plant sciences. He was educated at SNDP High School, Neeravil (1961), Sree Narayana College Kollam (1962-65), Aligarh Muslim University (1966-75) and started career at Regional Research Laboratory (renamed IIIM in 2007), Jammu (1969-1990) He got multidisciplinary training in cytogenetics, plant breeding, bioprospecting, biotechnology, conservation biology, ethnobiology, ethnopharmacology and pharmacognosy.

Pushpangadan published about 515 research papers/articles in various national and international journals, authored/edited 26 books, contributed 41 chapters in books in taxonomy, plant breeding, conservation biology, biotechnology, ethnobiology, ethnopharmacology and Intellectual property, etc. Filed/Awarded 232 patents in herbal drugs/products jointly with other scientists. 15 of his patented products are already commercialized. He was a recipient of several awards and honors which include Dingra Memorial Award (1980, 1983), Borlaug Award (1998), John W. Harshberger Medal (2001), UN-Equator Initiative Prize (2002), Ayurved Gaurav Award (2009), and Dr. A P J Abdul Kalam Memorial -NABS -Life time achievement award (2020).

Pushpangadan died on 19 December 2025, at the age of 81.

== Eponymy ==
Garcinia pushpangadaniana T.Sabu, N.Mohanan, Krishnaraj & Shareef (Clusiaceae), Heptapleurum pushpangadanii (Chakrab.) G.M.Plunkett & Lowry (Araliaceae), Ischaemum pushpangadanii Ravi, N.Mohanan & Kiran Raj (Poaceae), Meliola pushpangadanii Hosag. & T.K.Abraham (Meliolaceae), Myristica pushpangadaniana M.G.Govind & Dan ex Kottaim.(Myristicaceae), Pedicularis pushpangadanii T.Husain & Arti Garg (Orobanchaceae), Schefflera pushpangadanii Chakrab. (Araliaceae),
