= Kuzhimathicadu =

Village in Kollam District, Kerala, India

Kuzhimathicadu is a small village near Kundara, Kollam, India. It is located two km (1.2 miles) south of Arumurikkada. Kuzhimathicadu is the downtown area for nearby places. It is part of Kareepra Gram Panchayat, with its postal services delivered through Kuzhimathicaud SO, PIN 691509 Kuzhimathicadu is situated near regional transport routes and is served by bus services that connect it to nearby towns, including Kottarakkara and Kollam. Kuzhimathicadu lies roughly about 17 km from Kollam city by road, making it relatively accessible from the district headquarters. Kuzhimathicadu is one of the wards in the Kareepra Panchayat and serves as a local hub within the rural community It has a government higher secondary school that was established in 1915..There are also smaller schools like G.L.P.S. Kuzhimathicadu (local primary school). The Kuzhimathicadu Playground is a popular open space used for sports (football/cricket) and community events, indicating local recreational life. There are also temples, churches, mosques and other community facilities serving the population.
