= M. A. Baby =

Indian politician

Comrade M. A. Baby
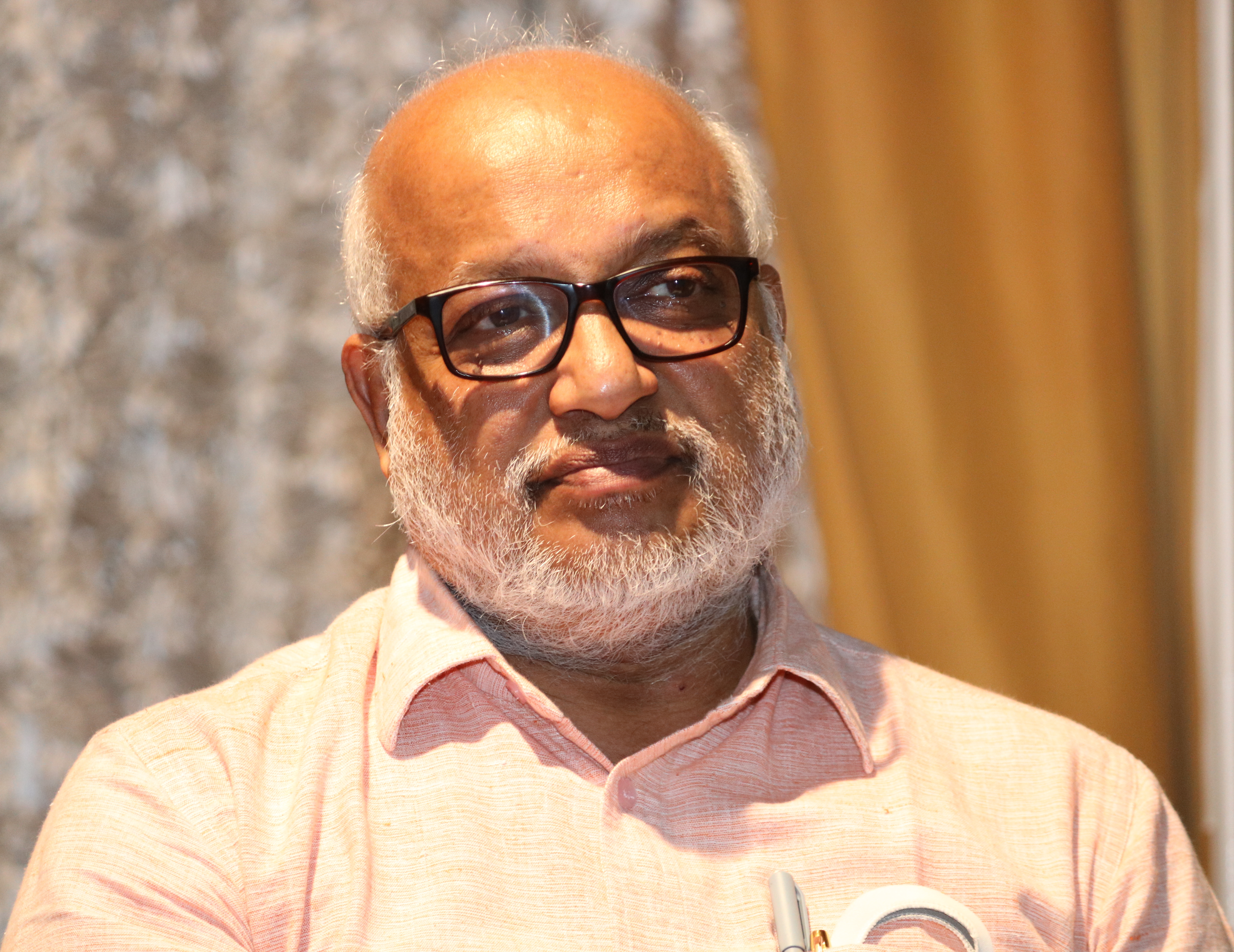
- M. A. Baby at Kollam on 23 April 2022

General Secretary of the Communist Party of India (Marxist)
- Incumbent
- Assumed office 6 April 2025
- Preceded by: Sitaram Yechury

Member of the Polit Bureau of the Communist Party of India (Marxist)
- Incumbent
- Assumed office April 2012

Member of Kerala Legislative assembly
- In office 11 May 2006 – 19 May 2016
- Preceded by: Kadavoor Sivadasan
- Succeeded by: J. Mercykutty Amma
- Constituency: Kundara

Minister of Education, Government of Kerala
- In office 18 May 2006 – 14 May 2011
- Preceded by: E. T. Mohammed Basheer
- Succeeded by: P. K. Abdu Rabb

Member of Parliament, Rajya Sabha
- In office 1986–1998
- Constituency: Kerala

Personal details
- Born: 5 April 1954 (age 72) Prakkulam, Kerala, India
- Party: Communist Party of India (Marxist)
- Spouse: Betty Louis
- Website: http://www.cpim.org/leadership

Marian Alexander Baby is an Indian Marxist politician who is currently serving as the General Secretary of the Communist Party of India (Marxist). He has served as a member of both the Rajya Sabha and the Kerala Legislative Assembly, and held the position of Minister for Education and Cultural Affairs in the Government of Kerala from 2006 to 2011. He was elected to the Politburo of CPI(M) in the 20th Congress held at Kozhikode, Kerala, in 2012, and is currently the general secretary of the Central Committee, the party's highest decision-making body. Baby is known for his contributions to the public education system in Kerala.

== Political life ==
M.A. Baby joined Kerala Students Federation, the predecessor of Students Federation of India, while he was studying at NSS high school, Prakkulam in Kollam district. He has held many responsible positions in the Students Federation of India, the Democratic Youth Federation of India, and the Communist Party of India (Marxist). Currently he is a Politburo member of CPI(M).

He served as a Member of Parliament from Rajya Sabha from 1986 to 1998.

He was the Minister of Education in Kerala from 2006 until 2011.

He unsuccessfully contested from Kollam against N. K. Premachandran of Revolutionary Socialist Party during the 2014 Indian general elections. He was elected as the General Secretary of the CPI(M) from the 24th Party Congress at Madurai on 6 April 2025.

He met Arvind kejriwal in September 2026 as opposition parties discussed coordination over concerns surrounding the functioning of the Election Commission of India and the Special Intensive Revision (SIR) of electoral rolls. The meeting followed Baby's letter to INDIA bloc and other non-NDA parties seeking a joint discussion on developments related to the SIR exercise. He also held discussions with Trinamool Congress leader Mamata Banerjee, who agreed on the need for coordinated action.

On October 10, 2026, he was detained during the 2026 anti-CEC protests in Delhi.

== Personal life ==
M. A. Baby was born to Latin rite Christian parents P. M. Alexander and Lilly Alexander on 5 April 1954 at Prakkulam in Kollam district of Kerala. Baby did his schooling from Prakkulam Lower Primary School and Prakkulam NSS High School & also served as an altar-boy at the local St. Elizabeth's Church in Prakkulam in the diocese of Kollam. It was during his high school days where he was first acquainted with politics. After completing basic schooling, Baby went to Sree Narayan College, Kollam for pre-degree. Later, Baby joined for BA in Political Science in SN College itself. However, he was unable to finish his bachelor's degree.

He is married to Betty Louis and has a son named Ashok Betty Nelson.

== Electoral performance ==
Election	Year	Party	Constituency	Result	Margin	Vote Share(%)
Kerala Legislative Assembly	2006	CPI(M)	Kundara	Won	14,869	55.00%
Kerala Legislative Assembly	2011	CPI(M)	Kundara	Won	14,703	52.48%
Lok Sabha	2014	CPI(M)	Kollam	Lost	37,649	42.2%
