= J. Mercykutty Amma =

Indian politician

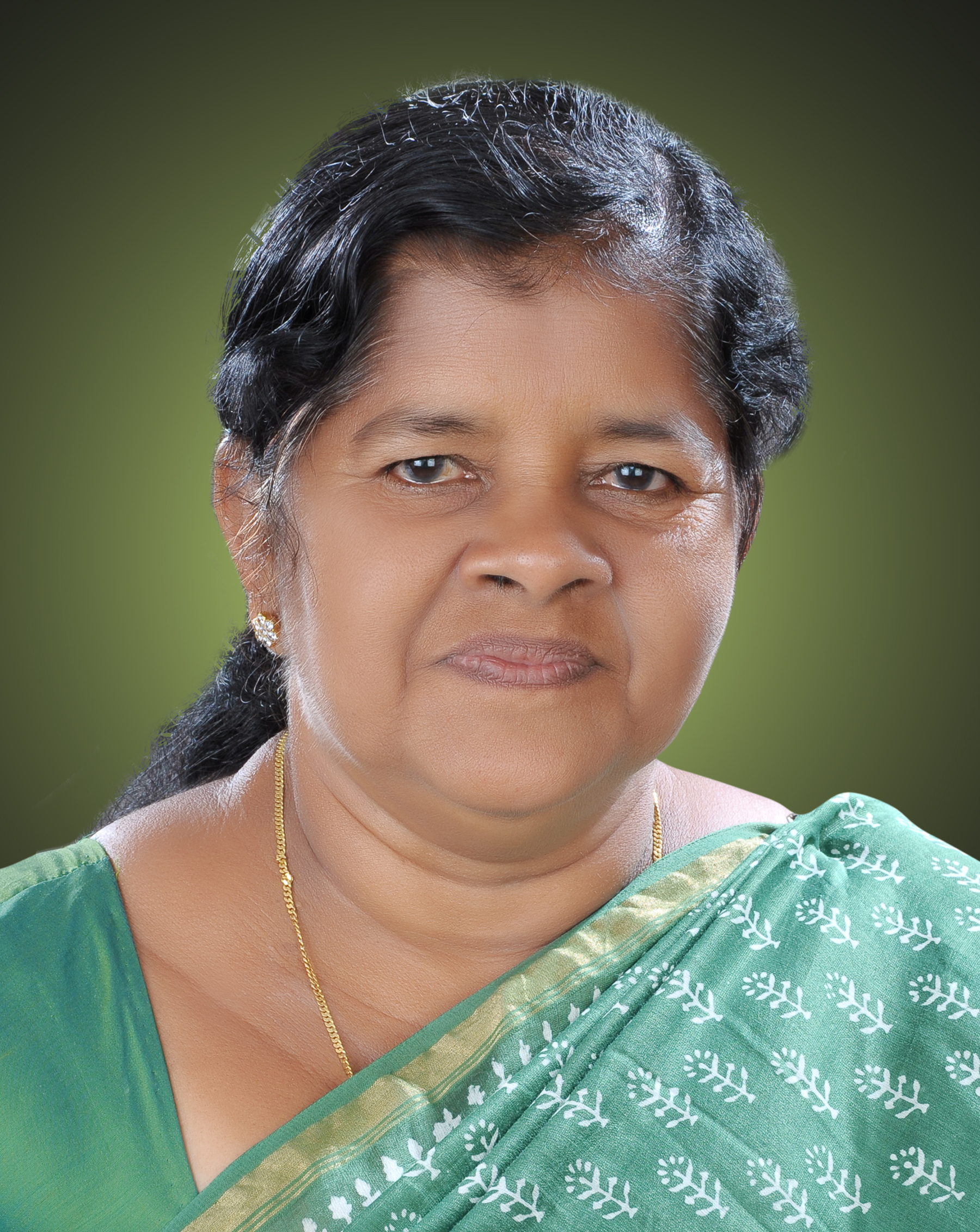

Minister for Fisheries, Harbour Engineering, Cashew Industries, Pro-Chancellor of Kerala Fisheries University
- In office 25 May 2016 – 3 May 2021
- Succeeded by: Saji Cherian

Member of the Kerala Legislative Assembly
- In office 2016–2021
- Preceded by: M. A. Baby
- Succeeded by: P. C. Vishnunath
- Constituency: Kundara
- In office 1996–2001
- Preceded by: Alphonsa John
- Succeeded by: Kadavoor Sivadasan
- Constituency: Kundara
- In office 1987–1991
- Preceded by: Thoppil Ravi
- Succeeded by: Alphonsa John
- Constituency: Kundara

Personal details
- Born: 30 September 1955 (age 70) Kollam, Kerala, India
- Party: Communist Party of India (Marxist)
- Spouse: B. Thulaseedhara Kurup
- Children: 2
- Parents: Francis; Jainamma

J. Mercykutty Amma (born 30 September 1955) is an Indian politician who was the Minister for Fisheries, Harbour Engineering, Cashew Industry & Fisheries University, Government of Kerala from 2016 to 2021. She represented Kundara constituency three times in her political career.

== Personal life ==
J. Mercykutty Amma was born to Jainamma and Francis at Munrothuruthu on 30 September 1955. She is married to B. Thulaseedhara Kurup, the President, Centre of Indian Trade Unions, Kollam. She resides at Keralapuram, Kollam.

== Education ==
Mercykutty Amma is a postgraduate in Malayalam and has completed LL.B. course.

== Political career ==
Mercykutty Amma occupied her seat after a long journey in left wing politics beginning as a student activist. She entered politics as an activist of Students Federation of India (SFI) during 1974. She was SFI office bearer at Fatima Matha National College, Kollam and Sree Narayana College, Kollam. She served as SFI State Vice President and All India Vice President up to 1985.

She held various positions in CITU and in Communist Party of India (Marxist). Smt. Mercykutty Amma was the District Committee President of Matsyathozhilali (Fishermen) Federation, Kollam up to 2012 and was the State Vice President during 1987 to 2005. She was also the District treasurer of Coir Workers Union, Kollam up to 1989 and the President of Khadi Workers Federation. She was also the Chairperson of Kerala State Co-operative Federation for Fisheries Development Ltd. (Matsyafed).

Now, Member, State Committee CPI (M); All India Vice President and State Secretary, CITU; Vice President, Kerala Cashew Workers Centre.

She was first elected to Kerala Legislative Assembly in 1987 (26 March 1987 – 17 June 1991). She was again elected to Kerala Legislative Assembly in 1996 (20 May 1996 – 13 May 2001). Mercykutty Amma was elected to the Kerala Legislative Assembly third time in 2016 and became Minister in charge of the portfolios of Fisheries, Harbour Engineering and Cashew Industry.

She had contested the 2021 Kerala Legislative Assembly election from Kundara assembly constituency and was defeated by P. C. Vishnunath of Indian National Congress by 4,454 votes.
