= Seethakali =

Seethakali (Malayalam: സീതക്കളി) is a subaltern folk dance-drama from Kerala, India. Believed to have originated around 150 years ago in the village of Perinad in the Kollam district. This was historically performed by Dalit artists belonging to the Vedar, Pulayar, and Kuravar communities. The ritualistic art form is deeply intertwined with the agrarian culture of Kerala and was traditionally performed during the annual Onam harvest festival.

Unlike mainstream renditions of the Indian epic Ramayana, Seethakali is distinct because it frames the narrative primarily from the perspective of Sita. The songs of Seethakali were not written down but were passed on orally.

Seethakali

Seethakali is a traditional art form native to the Desinganad region, believed to have originated centuries ago. From the time when myths and epics began to spread, various art forms were created based on their stories and themes.

In ancient times, some of these art forms were performed as folk songs and dances passed down orally, serving as forms of entertainment, while others were presented as ritualistic art forms.

Based on the Indian epic Ramayana, Seethakali was organized and structured by traditional teachers (Aashans) and passed down through generations by word of mouth. However, this art form disappeared about four and a half decades ago.

Seethakali was traditionally performed as an Onam-season folk art. It began in the evenings and continued until dawn, during the period from Atham to the 28th day of Onam in the month of Chingam.

In earlier times, Seethakali was performed by marginalized communities who were engaged in agricultural work, particularly in paddy fields and other farming activities.

The props used in Seethakali, such as bows, arrows, crowns, and other accessories, were made from natural materials including bamboo, reeds, areca palm, and palm leaves.

The performers painted their faces and bodies and wore colorful costumes to give themselves a divine appearance as they portrayed various mythological characters.

When members of these communities came to the courtyards of households where they had previously been prohibited from entering, they were welcomed by the residents with a traditional oil lamp (nilavilakku) and nirapara (a ceremonial measure filled with rice). The families also presented them with rice and clothes as gifts.

The stories performed in Seethakali ranged from Rama's journey into the forest in the Adhyatma Ramayana Kilippattu to the disappearance of Goddess Sita in the Uttara Ramayana. These episodes were sung in the form of songs, accompanied by rhythmic music and dance movements, as the performers went from house to house.

Although Seethakali was performed in rural areas of Kollam and Pathanamthitta districts, it remained particularly popular for a long period in the Perinad region.

A group of young people based in Perinad, Kollam, formed an organization called the “Kollam Seethakali Academy” with the aim of reviving this traditional heritage art form.

After its revival, the art form began to be taught to the younger generation and is now being performed on various stages.

Sri. Aji Iverala is an artist who has made a commendable contribution to the historical study, documentation, and revival of Seethakali. He is also the recipient of the 2023 Kerala Folklore Academy Award.

The Kollam Seethakali Academy aims to rediscover and revive this art form, which was traditionally performed by marginalized communities, while preserving its antiquity and authenticity and transforming it into a people's art form that transcends social discrimination and is accessible to everyone.

Aji Iverkala, Seethakali Artist (Kerala folklore academy Award Winner 2023)
