= Kainakary Thankaraj =

Indian actor (1946–2022)

- Born: 18 October 1946; Kainakary, Travancore present day Alappuzha district, Kerala, India
- Died: 3 April 2022 (aged 75); Keralapuram, Kerala, India
- Other name: Kainakari Thankaraj
- Occupation: Actor
- Years active: 1977–2022

Kainakary Thankaraj (18 October 1946 – 3 April 2022) was an Indian actor, who worked in the Malayalam movie industry and Malayalam Drama Theater Industry.

== Biography ==
Thankaraj, son of playwright Krishnankutty Bhagavathar, was born on 18 October 1946 in Kainakary, Travancore. He began acting at 13 and worked with several theater committees, including Kerala People's Arts Club. His film debut was in Aanappaachan (1978) alongside Prem Nazir, leading to roles in over 35 films.

Thankaraj started acting in plays while in school, becoming a popular face in amateur theatre alongside Nedumudi Venu, Fazil and Alleppey Ashraf. His first professional play was Changanasserry Geetha. He was part of many professional theatre collectives, including Kottayam National Theaters, Chalakkuddy Saradhi and KPAC. In 1995, he founded Kainakary Theaters and later formed a theatre troupe named Ambalappuzha Aksharajwala with late actor Thilakan.

Kainakary Thankaraj died on 3 April 2022 at his home in Velamkonam, Keralapuram, after prolonged suffering with liver-related issues. He was 75.

== Selected filmography ==
Year	Title	Role	Notes
1977	Achaaram Ammini Osharam Omana	Police officer	
1978	Aanappaachan	Shankaran	
1980	Agni Kshethram		
2008	Annan Thambi		
2013	Amen	Chali Pappan	
2014	Iyobinte Pusthakam		
2018	Ee.Ma.Yau.	Valiyathuparambil Vavachan Mesthiri	
2018	Iblis	Great Grandfather	
2019	Lucifer	Sakhaavu Nedumpally Krishnan	
2019	Ishq	Murugan	
2019	Vaarikkuzhiyile Kolapathakam	Kattuthara Vakkachan	
2021	Home	Appachan	
2021	Orilathanalil		
2021	Mohan Kumar Fans		
2022	Padavettu		
2023	Nanpakal Nerathu Mayakkam		
