= The Kerala Ceramics Limited =

Indian ceramics products manufacturing company

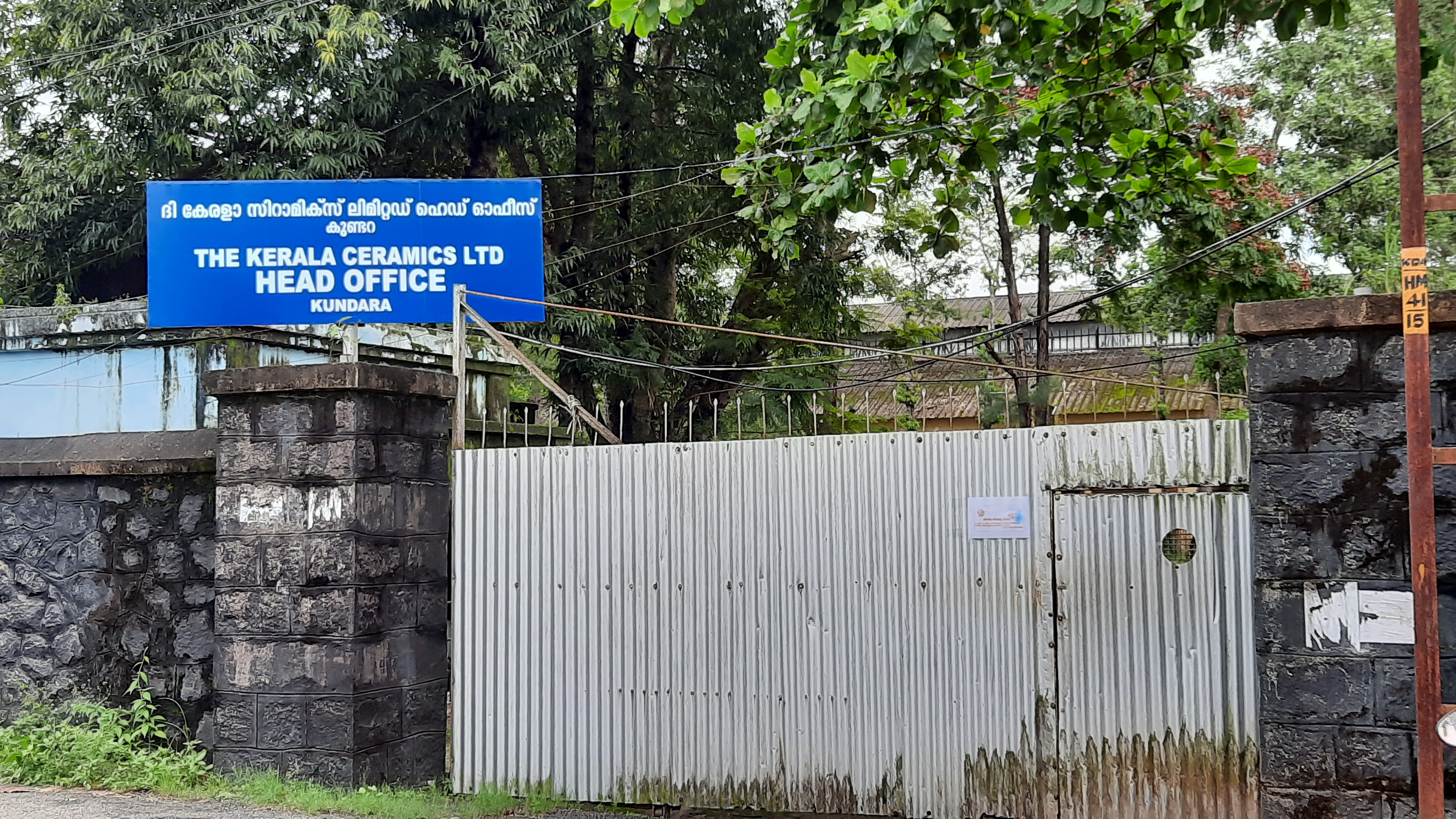
- Company type: Public Sector
- Industry: Manufacturing
- Founded: 1963; 63 years ago
- Headquarters: Kundara, Kollam, India
- Key people: Managing Director: Syamala. S; Manager(Personnel & Administration)i/c: Divin George
- Products: Spray dried Kaolin; Earthenware
- Revenue: ▲₹9.81 crore (US$1.0 million) (2020-21)
- Website: www.keralaceramics.com

The Kerala Ceramics Limited is a fully owned Government of Kerala ceramics products manufacturing company, situated at Kundara in Kollam city, India. The company produce earthenware and spray dried coating grade, as well as filler grade Kaolin for paint, paper manufacturing industries.

== History ==
The company was actually started operations in 1937 during the reign of Chithira Thirunal Balarama Varma as the King of Travancore. A mining and refining unit and a porcelain wares manufacturing unit were started. In 1963, the Government of Kerala led by Chief Minister R. Sankar incorporated the facility, as 'The Kerala Ceramics Limited' under Companies Act with its registered Office at Kundara, Kollam by amalgamating these two units.

The units in Kerala Ceramics have a capacity to manufacture 18000 tonnes of Kaolin. Kaolex and Kaofil are the two major types of Kaolin produced at Kundara plant. In 2017, the Kerala Government under the leadership of Pinarayi Vijayan started revival of Kerala Ceramics Limited and has registered operational profit in the financial year 2018–19, after a long journey of operational loss.

== Renovation ==
In 2017, Pinarayi Vijayan led LDF Government in Kerala commissioned a temporary LPG plant. This helped to reduce the production cost from ₹8,500 to ₹5,000-₹5,500. This enabled the company to generate $70 million in annual sales from a loss-making past. The newly renovated refining and filter pass plants will be inaugurated by Chief Minister Pinarayi Vijayan on 22 September 2020.
