= Techno-lodge =

Type of business park in India

A Techno-lodge is a small Information Technology park established by Government of Kerala in a small town or a village in Kerala. Techno-lodges constitute the third tier of the IT infrastructure in Kerala after the three hubs at Thiruvananthapuram (Technopark), Kochi (InfoPark) and Kozhikode (Cyberpark) and the secondary spokes in other major cities and towns. The Government has approved the setting up of two such parks in Kadakkal and Perinad Grama Panchayats in Kollam District.

== Objectives ==
The objective of the Techno-lodges scheme is to encourage IT-enabled Services and Business Process Outsourcing companies to operate from low cost rural centres and thereby to create employment in rural areas. The Techno-Lodge centres will be set up in old unused government buildings, buildings belonging to government organizations, panchayaths or other local bodies.

== Implementing agency ==
Kerala State IT Infrastructure Limited (KSITIL) is the main implementing agency for this scheme.

== See also ==
- Technopark, Trivandrum
- InfoPark, Kochi
- Technopark, Kollam
