= Orilathanalil =

- Directed by: Asok. R. Nath
- Written by: Sajith Raj
- Produced by: Sandeep. R
- Starring: Sreedharan Kaani; Arun Kumar; Kainakari Thankaraj; Shylaja. P. Ambu; Veronica Medeiros; Sabu Praudeen; Madhu Baalan; Dr. Asif Shah
- Cinematography: Sunil Prem L. S
- Edited by: Vipin Mannoor
- Music by: Anil
- Production company: Sahasrara Cinemas
- Release date: 23 April 2021
- Country: India
- Language: Malayalam

Orilathanalil is a 2021 Malayalam-language social drama film from India. It was produced by Sandeep. R under the banner Sahasrara Cinemas and directed by Asok. R. Nath who previously directed movies like Saphalam, December, Mizhikal Sakshi, Ven Shankhu Pol etc. Orilathanalil was one of the official entries at the Durban International Film Festival and Sacramento International Film Festival. The plot of the movie revolves around the survival of Achuthan, a physically disabled farmer played by Sreedharan Kaani, who has lost his hands in real life also and later became famous for winning the special award from the Kerala State Department of Agriculture as a role model and representative of the farmer community who has overcome their physical disabilities. The film is a journey through Sreedharan's real life too. It received great critical acclaim for the screenplay, direction, & the social issue discussed in the film among the critics subsequently winning Kerala Film Critics Award 2020 for Best Environmental Film.

== Cast ==
- Sreedharan Kaani as Achuthan
- Kainakary Thankaraj
- Arun Kumar
- Shylaja. P. Ambu
- Veronica Medeiros
- Sabu Praudeen
- Madhu Balan
- Dr. Asif Shah

== Production ==
The film was completely shot around the rural backdrop of Vellayani and Vellayani Lake in the suburbs of Thiruvananthapuram. The movie was produced as well as distributed by Sandeep. R under the banner Sahasrara Cinemas, Sunil Prem L. S did the Cinematography, Vipin Mannoor was the Editor, Harshvardhan Kumar did the Art Direction and Anil did the Background Score for this songless movie. The production of the movie was finished during the later months of 2020.

Apart from winning the Kerala Film Critics Award 2020 for Best Environmental Film. Orilathanalil has been successfully nominated on multiple other awards category too and also got the official entry for screening at numerous National and International Film Festivals like the prestigious Sacramento International Film Festival 2021 and Durban International Film Festival 2021.

== Release ==
The film was officially released on 23 April 2021 through the OTT platform 'First Shows'.

== Awards ==
- Best Environmental Film - Kerala Film Critics Award 2020
- J C Daniel Foundation Film Awards 2020
- Best Make-up: Lal Karamana
- Special Jury Mention: Sreedharan Kani
