= Technopark, Kollam =

Technopark Kollam
- Company type: Government owned
- Industry: Information Technology Business Park
- Genre: Infrastructure Service Provider
- Founded: July 1990 Dedicated to nation in November 1995
- Headquarters: Kundara, Kerala, India
- Area served: 0.1 Million sq.ft.
- Key people: Col Sanjeev Nair (Retd), CEO
- Owner: Government of Kerala
- Number of employees: 500 (2019)
- Website: www.technopark.org

Technopark, Kollam is an industrial park in Kundara, Kollam, It is a satellite park of Technopark that is situated 63 km away from the Trivandrum Campus. This is the first district level IT Park established in Kerala. The Technopark Kollam is situated in 44.47 acres (18.00 ha) of land beside Kanjiracode Lake. This park is developed as a Special Economic Zone.

Technopark Kollam houses domestic firms, mainly startups and MNC's engaged in a wide variety of activities, which include software development, mobile app development, enterprise solutions, business analytics, embedded system, internet of things, cloud computing, medical transcription and business process outsourcing.

== History ==
The plan for setting up the first district IT park in Kerala at Kollam was announced in January 2009. Foundation stone for park was laid by Chief minister of Kerala, Shri. V. S. Achuthanandan in February 2009. The park was set up expecting employment to the tune of 20,000 and investments of 800 crores. The land for the project was acquired by Kerala State Information Technology Infrastructure Ltd to set up Hub-and-spoke model of IT industry in Kerala.

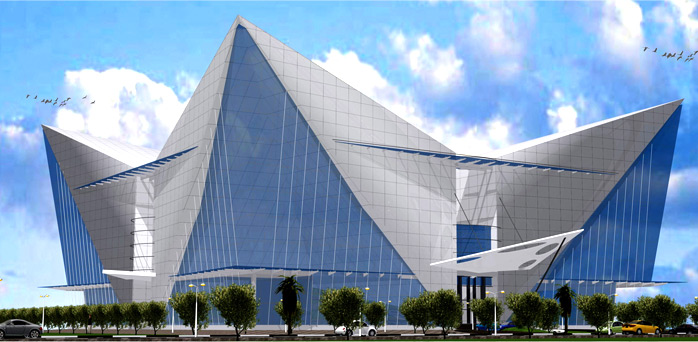
Design of Kollam Technopark after completion of Phase 2

The first phase of park was inaugurated by V. S. Achuthanandan on 15 February 2011. The park area was declared as Special Economic Zone. The park holds unique distinction of water-transport connectivity.

The park was showcased in GITEX Expo 2012 at Dubai.

On 1 February 2014, the first company in the park, Twixt Technologies, started operations.

In March 2014, Comptroller and Auditor General of India in his report criticized KSITIL and its hub, noting that the land acquired for the IT park had been poorly utilized.

== Accessibility and facilities ==
This technological park is accessible by road, rail and water modes of transport. Kundara railway station in Kollam–Sengottai Line is the nearest railway station. National Highway 183 (India) passes through near the park and National Highway 744 (India) passes through nearby town of Kundara.The Ashtamudi Lake adjoining the park has Kerala State Water Transport Department's boat services.

The Taluk Hospital Kundara under Health department is situated near the park entrance. Kerala Fire And Rescue Services facility is also available near the campus.

The nearest airport is Trivandrum International Airport which is 70 km away.

== Infrastructure ==
Phase 1 of the park is now complete with Ashtamudi building a seven-storey office building with 100,000 sq.ft space. Further phases are in planning stage.

== See also ==
- Technopark, Trivandrum
- Techno-lodge
- Kundara
