= Kadavoor Sivadasan =

Indian politician (1932–2019)

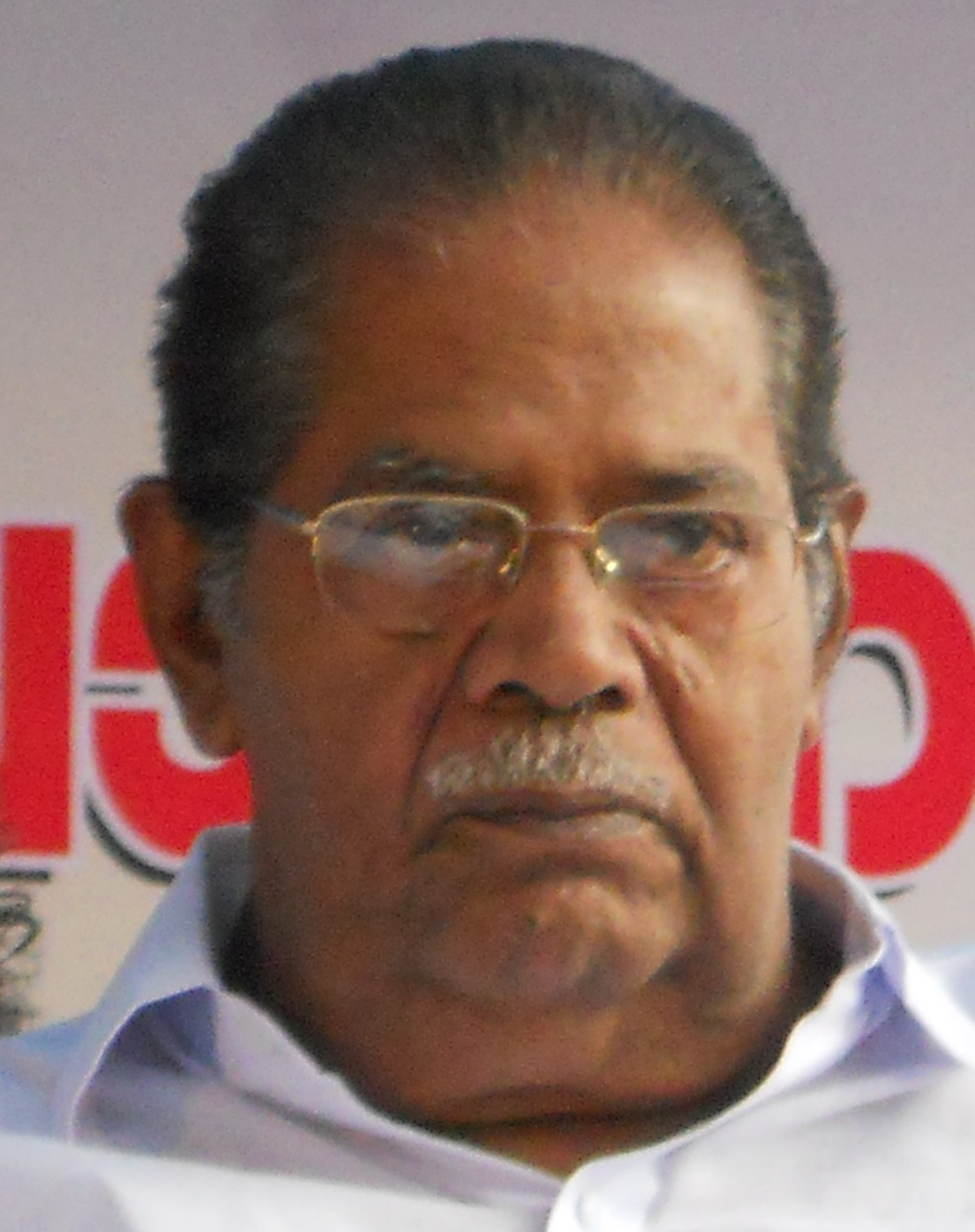

Minister Of Health & Family welfare , Government of Kerala
- In office 11 February 2004 - 29 August 2004
- Preceded by: P. Sankaran
- Succeeded by: K. K. Ramachandran Master

Minister of Electricity , Government of Kerala
- In office 26 May 2001 - 11 February 2004
- Preceded by: S. Sarma
- Succeeded by: K. Muraleedharan
- In office 26 June 2004 - 29 August 2004
- Preceded by: K. Muraleedharan
- Succeeded by: Aryadan Muhammed

Minister For Forest, Wildlife Protection and Rural Development , Government of Kerala
- In office 20 April 1995 to 9 May 1996
- Preceded by: K. P. Viswanathan (Minister For Forest and Wildlife Protection) K. Karunakaran
- Succeeded by: P. R. Kurup

Minister Of Labour ,Government of Kerala
- In office 24 May 1982 – 25 March 1987
- Another Departments: Minister For Excise
- Preceded by: Kadavoor Sivadasan; N. Sreenivasan (Minister For Excise)
- Succeeded by: K. Pankajakshan
- In office 28 December 1981 to 17 March 1982
- Preceded by: Aryadan Muhammed
- Succeeded by: Kadavoor Sivadasan

Personal details
- Born: 11 March 1932 Kadavoor, Kollam
- Died: 17 May 2019 (aged 87) Thiruvananthapuram, Kerala, India
- Party: Indian National Congress (19?? - 2019)
- Occupation: Politician
- Profession: Advocate, political worker, trade unionist

Kadavoor Sivadasan (also known as K. Sivadasan) (11 March 1932 – 17 May 2019) was a Minister in the Indian state of Kerala, Political leader, a noted advocate, and trade unionist from Kerala, India.

== Political career ==
Entering politics through students movements, he became the president of Progressive Students Union (PSU) in 1958. Later he enrolled as an advocate in Kollam Bar and was in active practice.

Sivadasan got elected to the Kerala Legislative Assembly for first time in 1980 contesting as an RSP candidate. He became elected in 1982 too as an RSP member. In 1991, 1996 and 2001 he got elected again, contesting as a candidate of the Indian National Congress.

Sivadasan was the minister for labour from 28 December 1981 to 17 March 1982 and minister for labour and excise during 1982–87 in the ministries headed by K. Karunakaran.

He served as Minister for Forests and Wildlife from 20 April 1995 to 9 May 1996 in the Ministry headed by A. K. Antony; again he was the Minister for Electricity from 26 May 2001 to 11 February 2004 and held the portfolios of health and family welfare from 11 February 2004 to 29 August 2004 in the ministry, also headed by A. K. Antony. Sivadasan was a senior congress leader and also served as DCC president of Kollam district, Kerala.

An active trade unionist, Sivadasan served as Secretary of Kerala Provisional United Trade Union Congress in 1977, and participated in the International Labour Organization (ILO) conference in Geneva representing Central Government in 1985. He also visited Italy, Switzerland, France, Germany and United Arab Emirates in various capacities.

== Assembly election candidature history ==
Year	Constituency	Opponent	Result	Margin
1980	Quilon	C. V. Padmarajan (INC)	Won	2,414
1982	Quilon	S. Thyagarajan (RSP)	Won	5,802
1987	Quilon	Babu Divakaran (RSP)	Lost	12,722
1991	Quilon	Babu Divakaran (RSP)	Won	4,476
1996	Quilon	Babu Divakaran (RSP)	Lost	6,298
2001	Kundara	J. Mercykutty Amma (CPI(M))	Won	4,467
2006	Kundara	M.A. Baby (CPI(M))	Lost	14,869

== Death ==
He died on 17 May 2019 due to age-related illness.
