= Kundara East railway station =

Railway station in Kerala, India

Kundara East
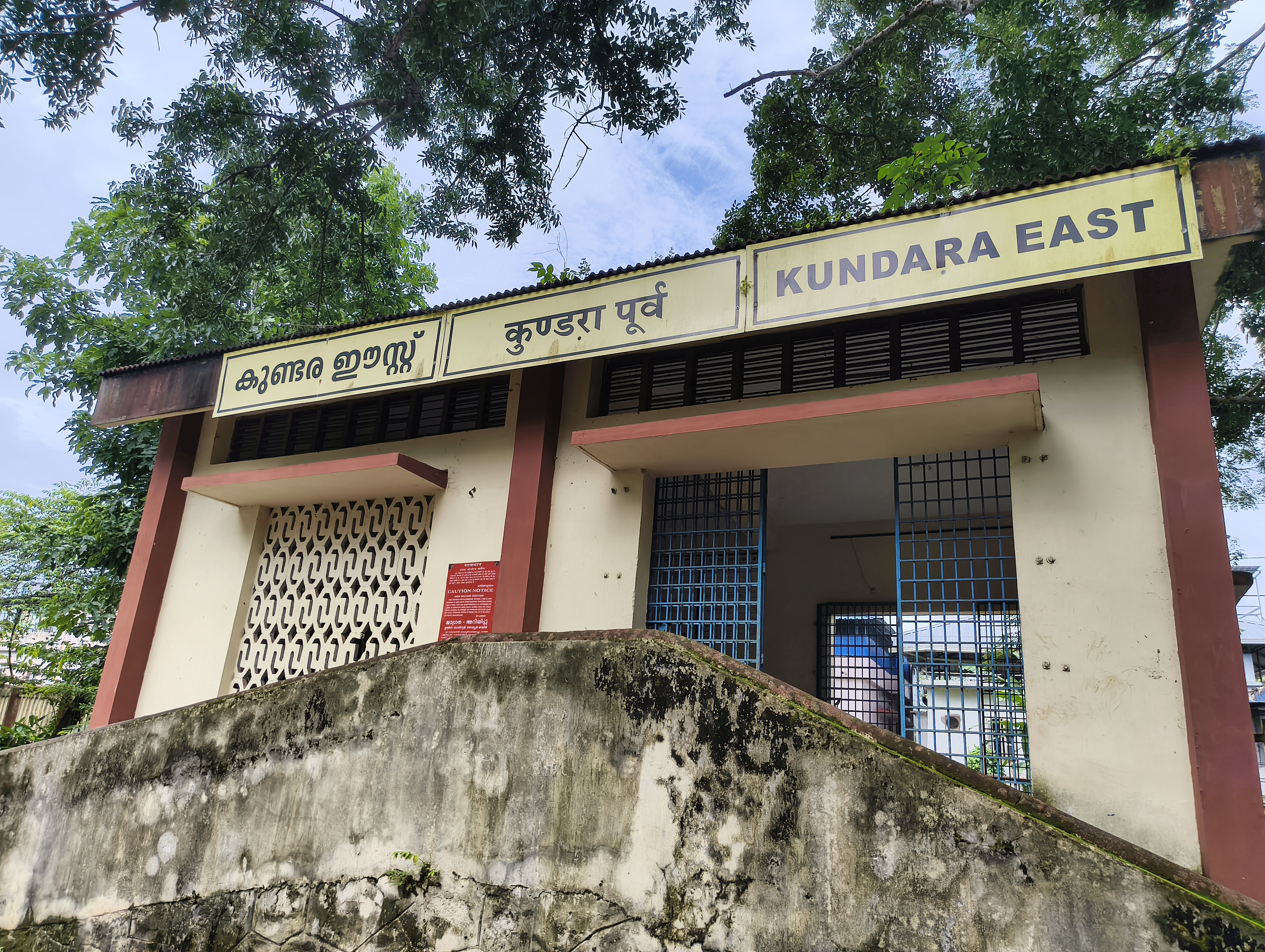
- Kundara East Railway Station

General information
- Location: Pallimukku, Kundara, Kollam, Kerala; India
- Coordinates: 8.969263°N 76.690209°E
- System: Regional rail, Light rail & Commuter rail station
- Owner: Indian Railways
- Operator: Southern Railway zone
- Line: Kollam–Sengottai branch line
- Platforms: 1
- Tracks: 1

Construction
- Structure type: At–grade
- Parking: Available

Other information
- Status: Functioning
- Station code: KFV
- Zone(s): Southern Railway zone
- Division(s): Madurai
- Fare zone: Indian Railways

History
- Opened: 1904; 122 years ago
Route map
Location
- Location within India Location within Kerala

Kundara East railway station (Code: KFV) is a railway station situated in Kundara town in Kollam, Kerala. Kundara East railway station falls under the Madurai railway division of the Southern Railway zone, Indian Railways. The station is one of two railway stations in the industrial town of Kundara. Other one is Kundara railway station.

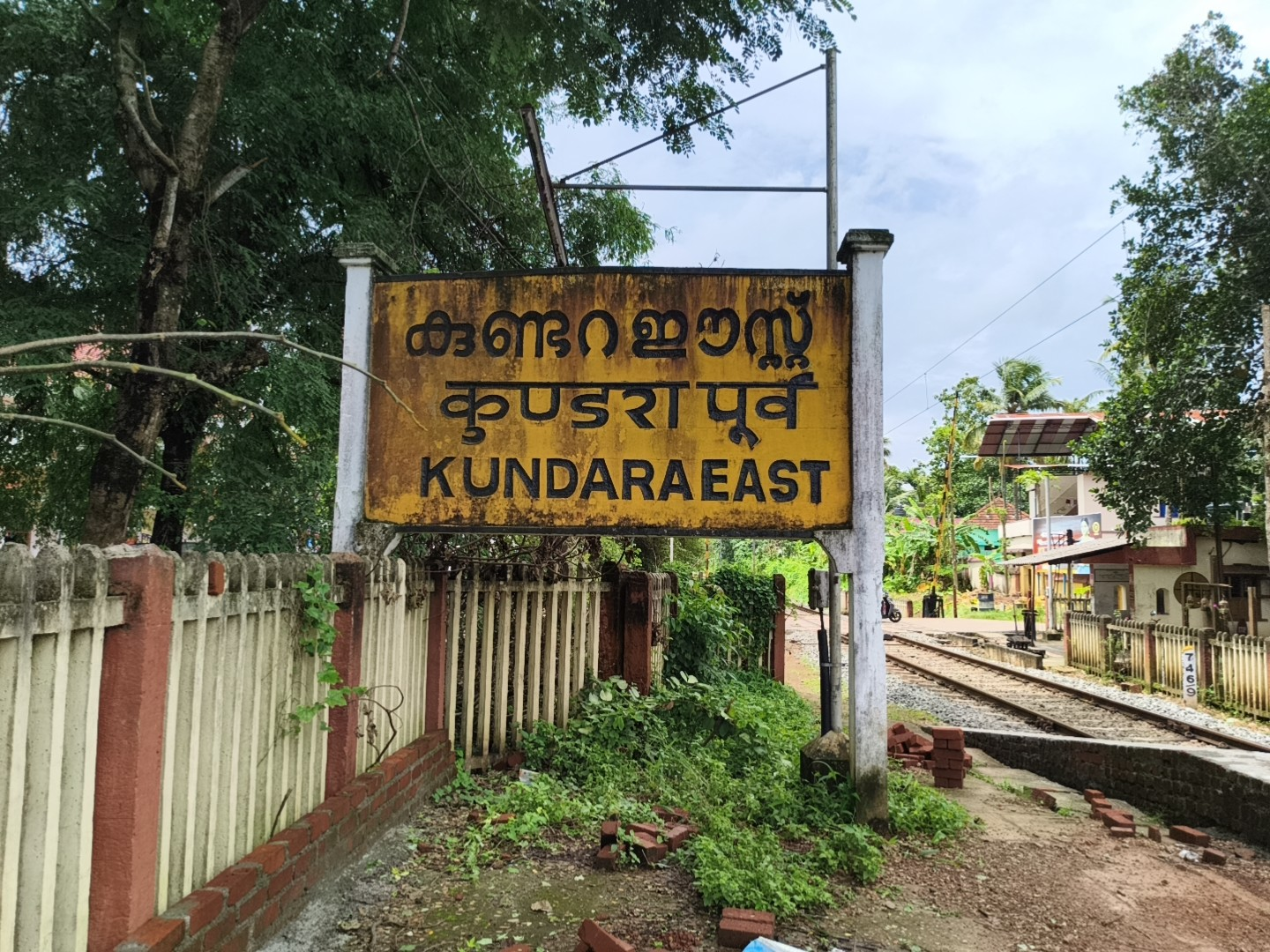
Kundara East Sign Board

== Services ==
Train number	Source	Destination	Name/Type
56332	Kollam Junction	Punalur	Passenger
56331	Punalur	Kollam Junction	Passenger
56334	Kollam Junction	Punalur	Passenger
56700	Madurai	Punalur	Passenger
56333	Punalur	Kollam Junction	Passenger
56336	Kollam Junction	Punalur	Passenger
56335	Punalur	Kollam Junction	Passenger
56701	Punalur	Madurai	Passenger
56338	Kollam Junction	Punalur	Passenger
56337	Punalur	Kollam Junction	Passenger

== See also ==
- Kundara railway station
- Kollam Junction railway station
- Paravur railway station
- Punalur railway station
- Kottarakara railway station
