= Kallamaala Samaram =

1915 social unrest in Kollam district, India

Kallamaala Samaram (transl. Stone Necklace Protest) (Not Kallumaala Samaram) is a period of social revolution by the Pulayar community that took place at Perinad and nearby villages such as Cherumoodu, Kanjavely in Kollam district on 24 October 1915.

It is at the climax of Perinad Lahala or Perinad Mutiny.

== History ==
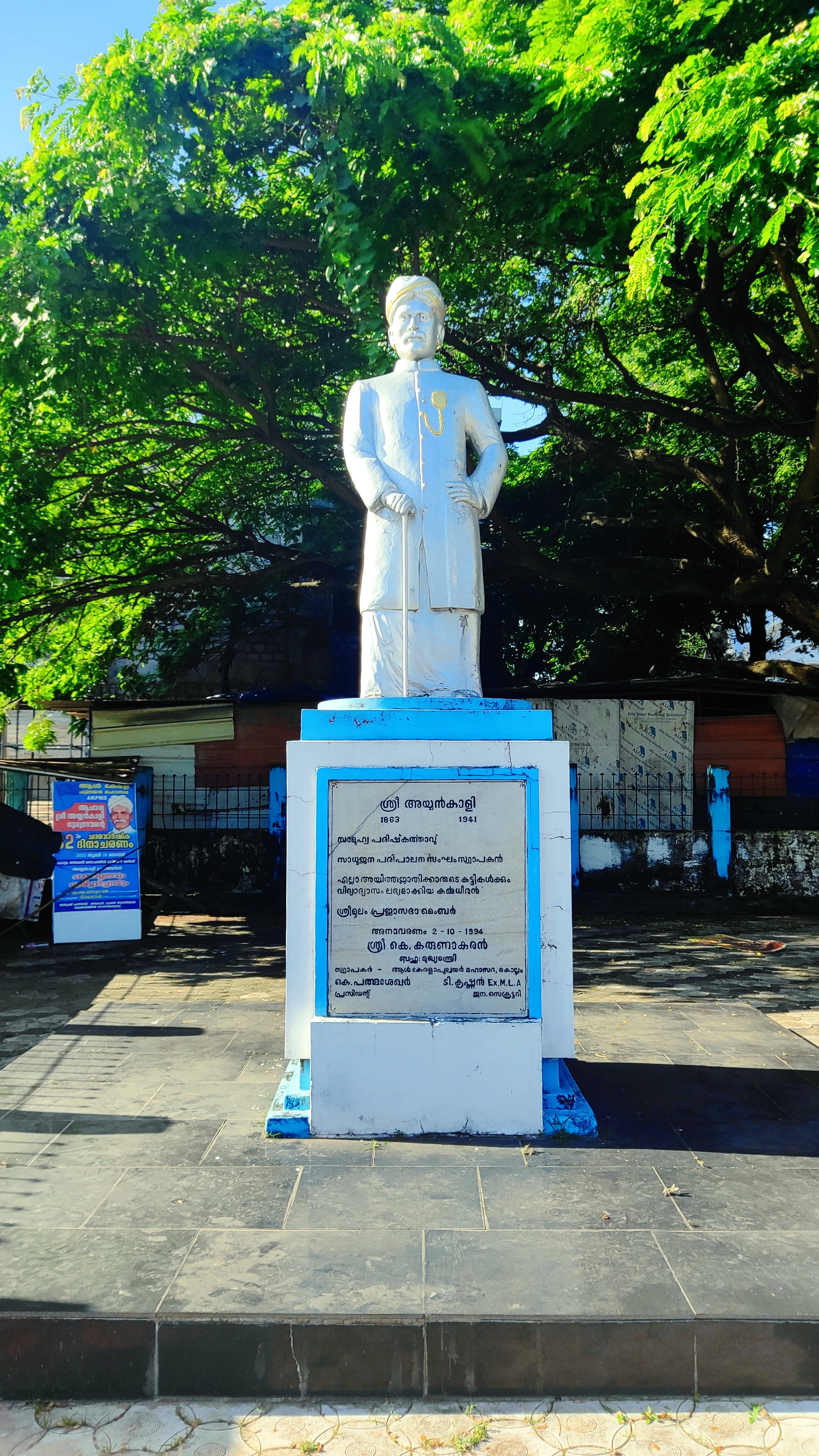
Memorial at Cantonment ground, Kollam

Kallamaala Samaram was a sudden uprising against the upper class's dictum of the minority castes to not use the public road, wear good dresses, use umbrellas, receive education, enter temples, take days off from labor, and wear gold or metal ornaments.

There was a naattukoottam organised to discuss these issues but the landlord class rejected the proposals from Pulayas.The unrest intensified following this and the lower caste communities decided to convene a large meeting at Plavilapurayidom, Cherumoodu, near Perinad on 24 October 1915. On the day of meeting a group of nair landlords under leadership of Koori Maathu and Kannan Pillai attacked and injured many who have gathered at the meeting place. There was violent clashes between both the groups and arson ensuing this incident.

At the end by December, a meeting was convened under the chair of Ayyankali, Changanassery Parameswaran Pillai and British officials on 21 December 1915 at Peeranki Maidan bringing together both the conflicting groups. In this meeting, women belonging to Pulaya community threw away the Kallamaala (ornaments made out of stone and woods) and proclaimed that they will only use gold or metal ornaments. Kallamaalas were chains of beads worn by their ladies as a symbol of slavery and inferior caste status.

During pre-independence era, several rules were imposed on women from lower castes in Kerala There were strict diktats regarding dress codes and ornaments and there were taxes to be paid to erstwhile Travancore kings for covering their breasts.

Once the unrest was over, there were many cases and counter cases that were filed before the magistrate. The advocate Elanjikkal John Vakil represented the cases for Dalits. In lieu of the lawyer's fees, he asked the accused to contribute labour to build a pond for public use at Kollam. This pond named Kamman kulam still exist near the Kollam district panchayath office, Thevally.

== See also ==
- Caste system in India
- Ayyankali
- Caste system in Kerala
- Channar revolt
- Ooruttambalam
