= Sacramento Film Festival =

The Sacramento International Film Festival ("SFF") is an arts organization with year-round activities, culminating in an annual film celebration each year in late March and continuing to early April

== Mission ==
Combining parties, live speakers, events and film screenings, the festival has come to be regarded as a centerpiece for the film scene in Sacramento, California, United States, though it has inspired or supported several similar events (i.e. French and Jewish fests). The festival only screens films that have not previously shown in or near Sacramento.

== History ==
The Sacramento Film Festival started its life as the Sacramento Festival of Cinema, making it the oldest concurrently running all-genre film screening event in the Sacramento region. The Festival of Cinema began in 1995 under the guidance of Founder and Director Kenneth Segura Knoll. In 1998 Mr. Knoll transferred management of the event to Access Sacramento, a Public, educational, and government access (PEG) cable TV station which had been a supporting partner to the festival since its beginning. Access Sacramento's Executive Director, Ron Cooper, assigned managing director duties to his outreach coordinator, Martin Anaya.

In 2004, due to budget and staffing cuts Access Sacramento management decided to forgo the larger Festival in favor of one of its components, the highly successful "Place Called Sacramento" local film incubation program, started by Mr. Cooper and Anaya. Not wanting many of the other festival programs to suffer, Martin Anaya asked for and received Access Sacramento's blessing to continue the Festival of Cinema separately under the new banner "The Sacramento Film Festival".

== Goal ==
The stated goal of the festival is to serve and promote the Sacramento community as a cultural center for film arts.
