= Kilikollur railway station =

Railway station in Kerala, India

Kilikollur
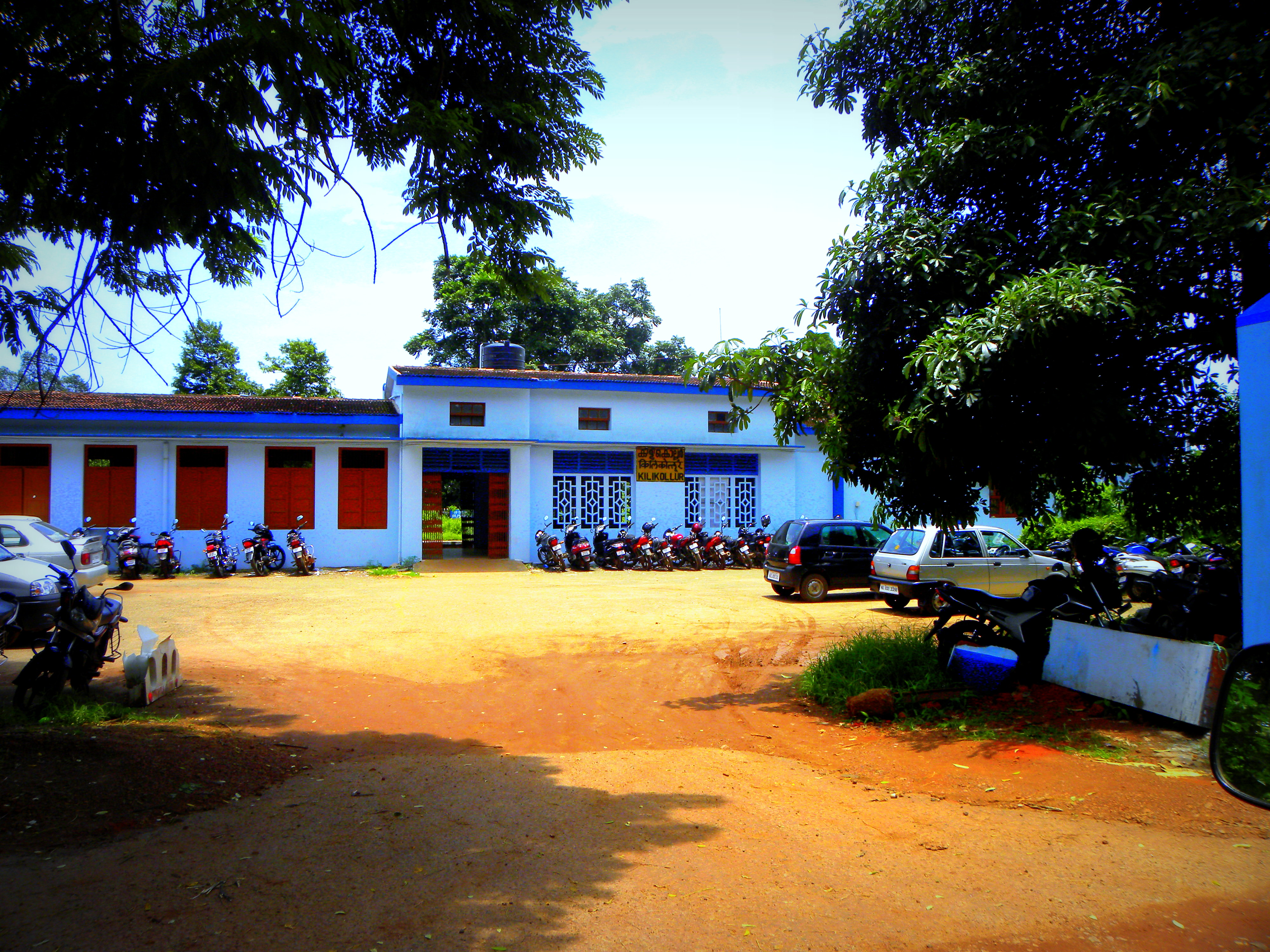
- Kilikollur railway station building

General information
- Location: Karicode, Kollam, Kerala; India
- Coordinates: 8.9179°N 76.6326°E
- System: Regional rail, Light rail & Commuter rail station
- Owner: Indian Railways
- Operator: Southern Railway zone
- Line: Kollam–Sengottai branch line
- Platforms: 2
- Tracks: 2

Construction
- Structure type: At–grade
- Parking: Available

Other information
- Status: Functioning
- Station code: KLQ
- Zone(s): Southern Railway zone
- Division(s): Madurai
- Fare zone: Indian Railways

History
- Opened: 1904; 122 years ago

Passengers
- 2022–23: 666 per day 242,966 per year
Route map
Location
- Location within India Location within Kerala

Kilikollur railway station (station code:KLQ) is an NSG–6 category Indian railway station in Madurai railway division of Southern Railway zone, serving the city of Kollam. The station is located on Kollam–Punalur section in Kollam district of the Indian state of Kerala. The station is one among the four railway stations serving the city of Kollam. Other railway stations in the city are Kollam Junction railway station, Kundara railway station and Eravipuram railway station. All the trains passing through have halt in this station, except the Tambaram–Kollam Special Express running on the newly commissioned Punalur–Sengottai line.

== Performance and earnings ==
For the FY 2022–23, the annual earnings of the station was ₹3,216,903 (US$33,000) and daily earnings was ₹8,813 (US$92). For the same financial year, the annual passenger count was 242,966 and daily count was 666. While, the footfall per day was recorded as 980.

== See also ==
- List of railway stations in India
