= Institute of Fashion Technology Kerala =

Fashion school in Vellimon, India

Institute of Fashion Technology Kerala (IFTK)
- An Institute of Excellence under the aegis of Centre For Continuing Education Kerala (CCEK)
- Established: 4 April 2010
- Mission: Providing a common platform for fashion education, research and training
- Focus: Fashion Design
- Principal: P. Lakshmana Kanth
- Owner: Government of Kerala
- Address: Vellimon West PO, Kundara
- Location: Vellimon, Kollam, Kerala, India
- Coordinates: 8.960303°N 76.643081°E
- Interactive map of Institute of Fashion Technology Kerala (IFTK)
- Website: http://www.iftk.ac.in/index.php

The Institute of Fashion Technology Kerala or IFTK-Kollam is a fashion technology institute located at Vellimon in Kollam, India. IFTK-Kollam is first and one of its kind, established by Government of Kerala with the intention of developing professionals for taking up leadership positions in fashion business in the emerging global scenario. IFTK-Kollam is inaugurated by the then honorable Chief Minister Sri.V.S Achuthanandan on 5 April 2010. The academy is in technical collaboration with the National Institute of Fashion Technology (NIFT), Ministry of Textiles, Government of India. The Institute aims at providing a common platform for fashion education, research and training.

== Courses ==
- Bachelor of Design (B.Des) – Fashion Design

== Facilities ==
- Smart classrooms equipped with most modern facilities
- Industrial Visits
- Laboratories
- Resource Center
- Canteen
- Hostel facilities
