= Kanjavely =

Kanjavely Kanjavelly
- village
- Location in Kerala, India Kanjavely (India)
- Coordinates: 8.944661°N 76.593944°E
- Country: India
- State: Kerala
- District: Kollam

Languages
  - Official: Malayalam, English
- Time zone: UTC+5:30 (IST)
- PIN: 691602
- Telephone code: 0474
- Vehicle registration: KL-02
- Nearest city: kollam
- Climate: climate is very pleseant here (Köppen)

Kanjavely is a village in the Thrikkaruva panchayat of Kollam district in Kerala, India.
