= Kundara =

Kundara Kundara
- Satellite Town
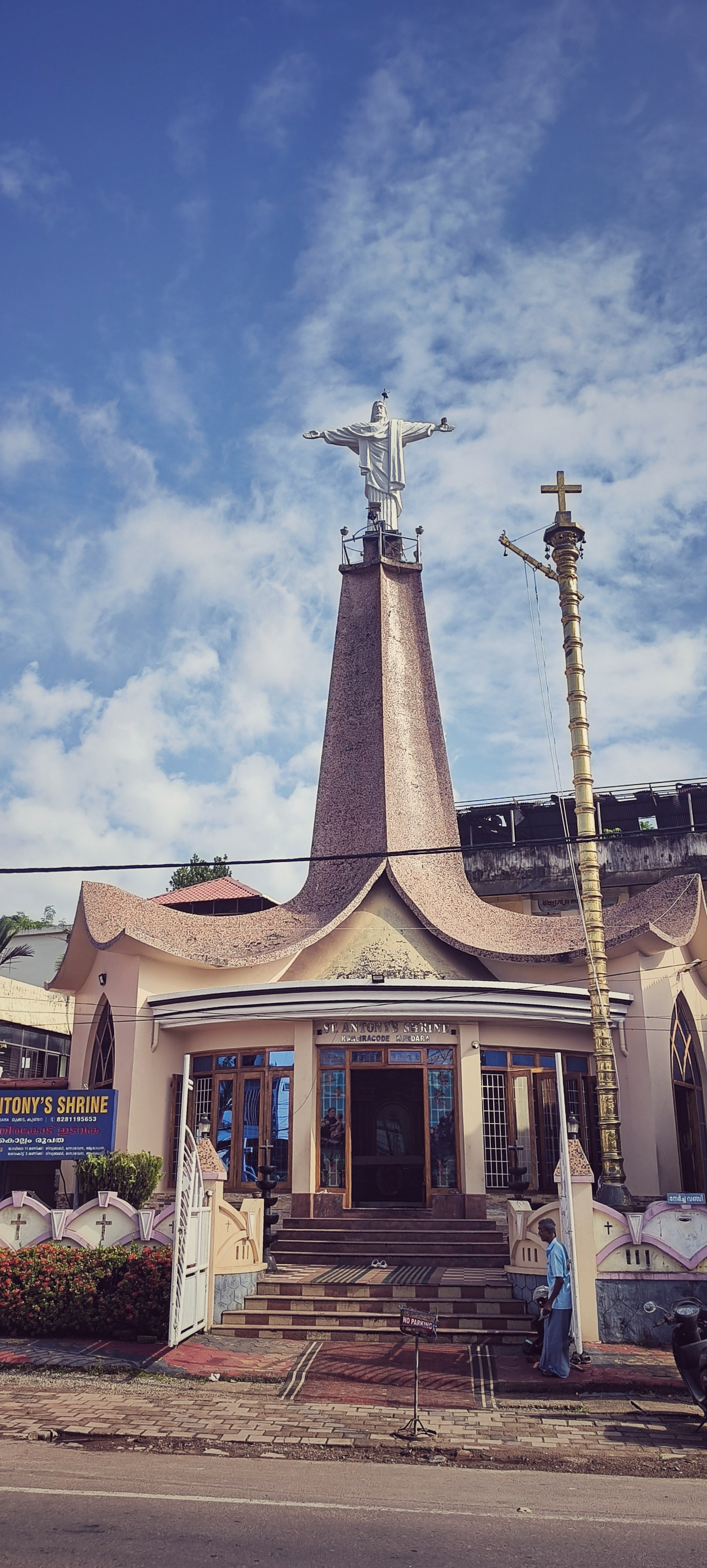
- St. Antony's Shrine, Mukkada
- Interactive map of Kundara
- Coordinates: 8°57′26.1″N 76°40′23.3″E
- Country: India
- State: Kerala
- District: Kollam

Government
  - Type: Panchayati Raj (India)
  - Body: Kollam Municipal Corporation Kilikollur zone, Kundara Grama Panchayat, Perinad Grama Panchayat, Elampalloor Grama Panchayat, Kottamkara Grama Panchayat

Area
  - Total: 11.07 km^{2} (4.27 sq mi)
- Elevation: 37 m (121 ft)

Population (2011)
  - Total: 14,651
  - Density: 1,323/km^{2} (3,428/sq mi)

Languages
  - Official: Malayalam, English
- Time zone: UTC+5:30 (IST)
- PIN: 691501
- Telephone code: +91 (0)474
- ISO 3166 code: IN-KL
- Vehicle registration: KL-02
- Nearest city: Kollam (13 km)
- Sex ratio: 1096 ♂/♀
- Literacy: 93.999%
- Civic agency: Kundara Panchayat
- Climate: Am/Aw (Köppen)
- Avg. annual temperature: 27.2 °C (81.0 °F)
- Avg. summer temperature: 35 °C (95 °F)
- Avg. winter temperature: 24.4 °C (75.9 °F)

Kundara is a satellite town in Kerala and is part of the Kollam Metropolitan Area, India. Kundara is situated at the eastern end of Kollam city. Kundara is significant for its historic involvement in the Indian independence movement.

Kundara was once the industrial hub of Southern Kerala, which was the home to prominent industrial companies including Kerala Electrical and Allied Engineering Company, The Aluminium Industries Limited, Kundara(commonly known as ALIND), The Kerala Ceramics Limited and the Lakshmi Starch company. Many of these companies have closed down or turned into sick industries. Kundara is attempting to revive this industrial tradition and glory of bygone era now by developing Technopark Kollam and The Kerala Ceramics Limited.

Kundara is also famous for backwater fishing since it is located on the shores of Kanjiracode Lake, a branch of Ashtamudi Lake. This lake recently received Marine Stewardship council recognition for sustainable fishing..

== History ==
Kundara has a prominent place in the history of Kerala and the independence struggle of India. The place witnessed the historic Kundara proclamation made by then Dalava of Travancore, Velu Thampi Dalawa on 1809 January 11.

=== Kundara Proclamation ===
Velu Thambi Dalawa, the Prime Minister/Diwan (Dalava) to King Balarama Varma of Travancore in present-day Kerala was one of the earliest opponents of British rule. Velu Thampi dalawa in January 1809 made a proclamation known as the Kundara Proclamation. It was an open call to arms, exhorting the common people to rise up against the British and to overthrow them. There was a massive response to his rallying call. Dalawa had to commit suicide on exile later at Mannadi near Adoor.

In the year 2007, the then Education Minister of Kerala, Shri. M A Baby, unveiled the 'Kundara Vilambaram' memorial at Ellampallor from where the proclamation was made two centuries ago.

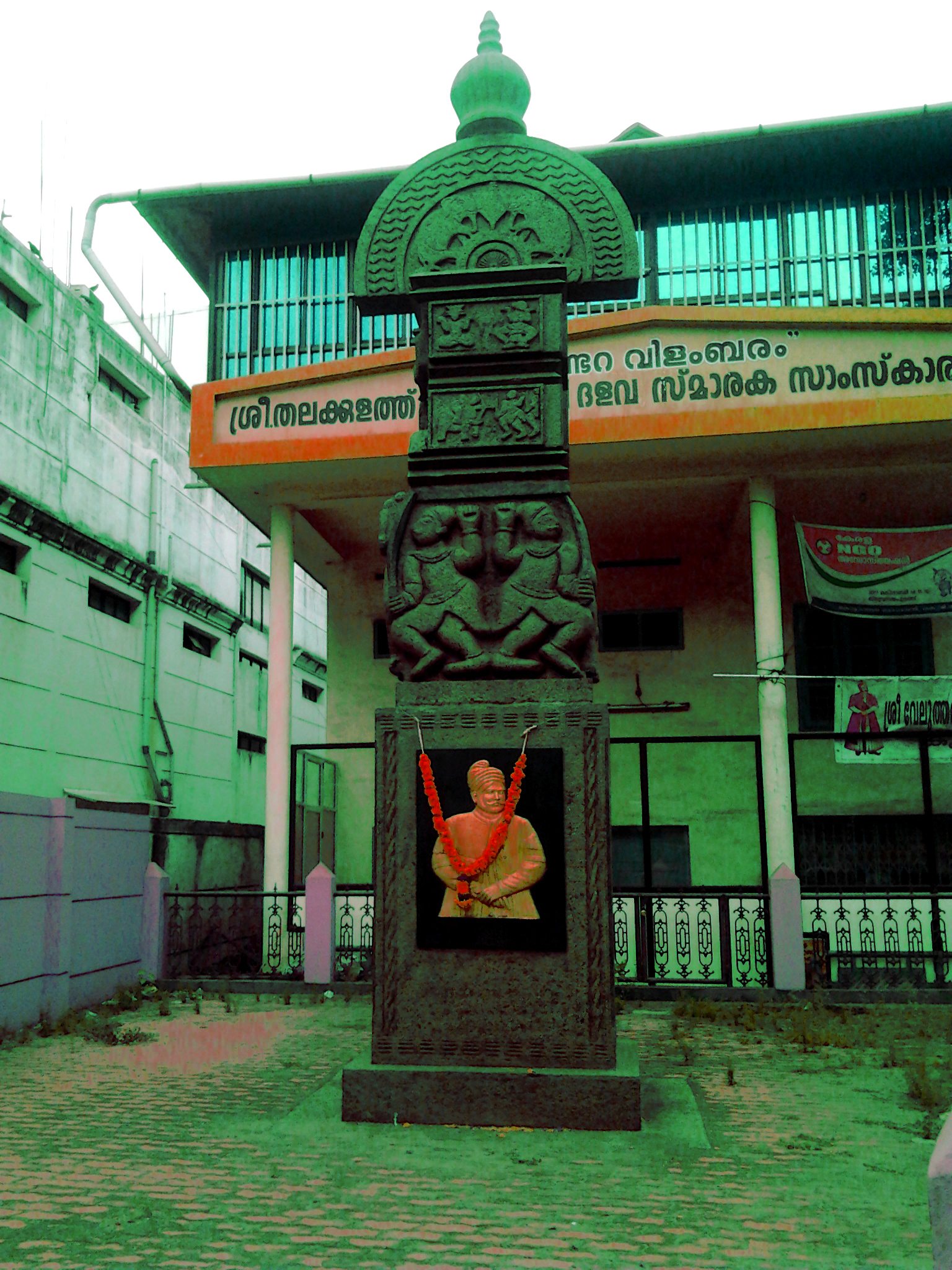
The memorial of Kundara Proclamation near Elamballoor, Kundara

=== Industrial history ===
Since early days Kundara developed as a market place for trade due to 21 feet wide Quilon Sengotta Road that connected Travancore to Madras Presidency and proximity to water transport through Ashtamudi Lake. In 1904 the Kollam-Sengottai rail line opened up through Kundara. This development facilitated ease of transportation of man, machine and raw material for industrial production to Kollam through rail line from Madras.

In the 1920s Cashew industry boomed in and around Kollam. This gave the first taste of modern industry to Kundara and adjoining areas.

Kundara had abundant reserves of China-clay the key raw material for Ceramic and Porcelain. In 1937 during reign of Chithira Thirunal Balarama Varma the clay processing industry was started in Kundara. In the 1960s this developed into The Kerala Ceramics Limited.

The backbone of modern industrialisation of Kundara was setting up of a 66kV Electrical substation at Kundara on 3 May 1940 which complemented the Pallivasal project, the first hydroelectric project in Kerala. This was part of the network of first eight substations established in Travancore between Thrissur and Trivandrum in order to transmit hydroelectricity generated to households towns and industries. The Kundara substation was later upgraded to 220kV capacity and today it is vital in providing electricity to Kollam City and Kollam–Thiruvananthapuram trunk line of Southern Railways.

The power of availability of cheap hydroelectricity in Kundara then was such that, it prompted the famous Nobel Laureate, C. V. Raman and his close associate, P. Krishnamurti to set up the first ever unit of their newly formed company, Travancore Chemical & Manufacturing Company Ltd (TCM Ltd) at Kundara in 1943. The unit produced Potassium chlorate an ingredient used in Safety match. This unit once existed near Elampalloor Masjid on present day NH 183 and today it no longer exist

The setting up of substation also helped start Aluminium Industry in Kundara. On the invitation of C. P. Ramaswami Iyer the Diwan of travancore, on 2 January 1946, Seshasayee Brothers Group of Madras started the famous ALIND, Kundara. The company was pioneers in aluminium electrical cable manufacturing in the region and has manufactured cables more than 1 crore km in length. The company slipped into crisis in the late 1980s due to labour issues and poor management.

The industrial prowess of Kundara lead to establishment of Kerala Electrical and Allied Engineering Company unit in Kundara for manufacturing train lighting alternator in 1964.

After two lost decades the industrial sector in Kundara received a renewed attention since the early 2010s. The setting up of Technopark Kollam at Kundara in February 2011 and renewed emphasis on revival of ALIND KEL and Kerala Ceramics since 2016 are currently happening.

=== Kallumala Samaram ===
Kallumala Samaram a historic event in Renaissance in Kerala also took place in Perinad near Kundara.

== Demographics ==
Religion in Kundara
Religion	Percentage
Hinduism	63%
Islam	18%
Christianity	18%
Others	1%
Distribution of religions †Includes Not Stated, Sikhs (<0.01%), Buddhists (<0.01%).

As of the 2011 Census of India, Kundara is a census town in Kollam District in the state of Kerala with a total population of 33,959. The population of children aged 0–6 is 3243, representing 9.55% of the total population of Kundara. The female sex ratio is 1096 per 1000 males, against state average of 1084 and the child sex ratio is 993 females per 1000 males, compared to the Kerala state average of 964. Kundara's literacy rate is 93.99%, lower than the state average of 95%. The male literacy is 96.42% and the female literacy rate is 91.80%.

== Politics ==
Kundara is one among the 11 legislative assembly constituencies in the district of Kollam. P. C. Vishnunadh is the current elected member from Kundara constituency is also a cabinet Minister for Tourism, Culture and Cinema.

== Transport ==
=== Railways ===
Kundara, Kilikollur, Kundara East and Chandanattop are the railway stations in Kundara town. In Kerala it is very rare to have more than one railway station in a town. These stations are part of the Kollam–Sengottai branch line.

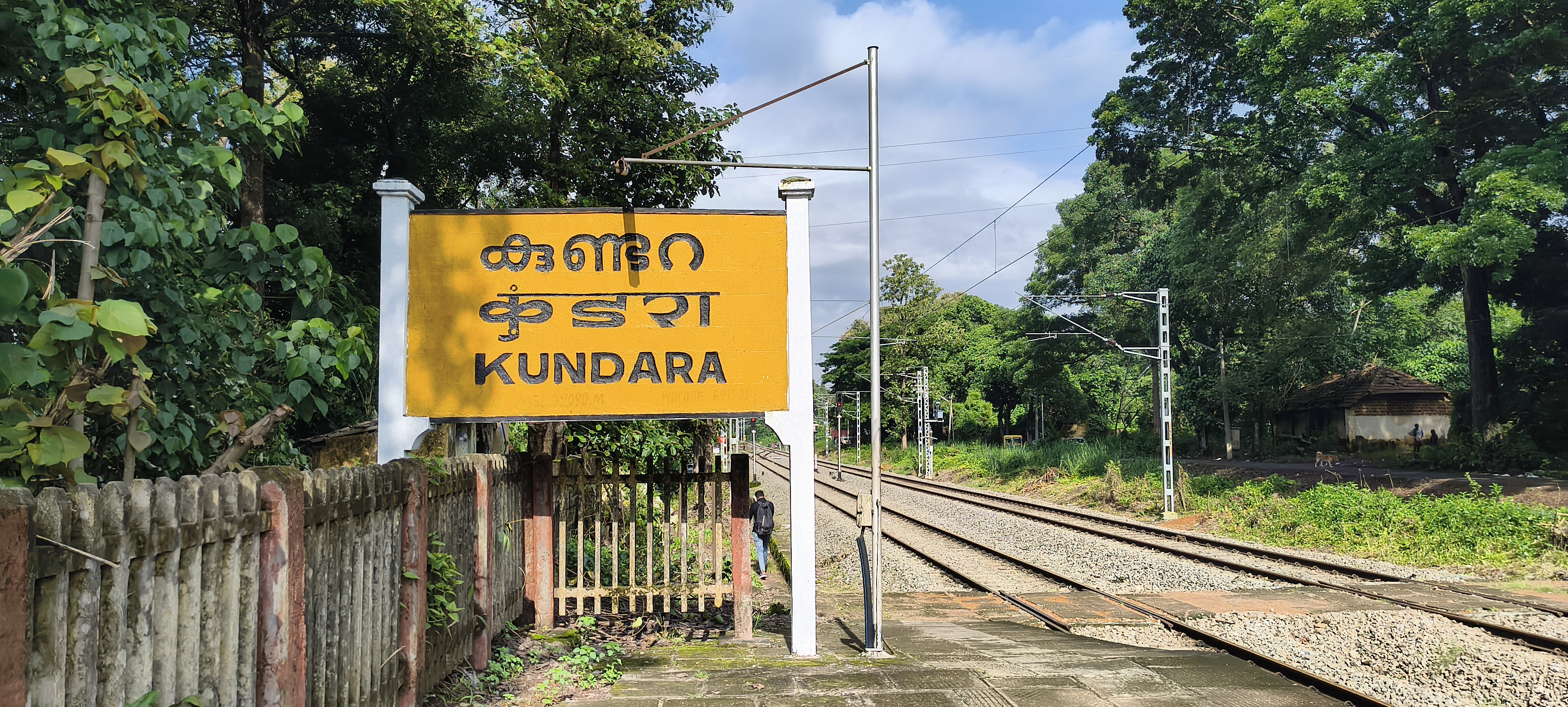
Kundara railway station Sign Board

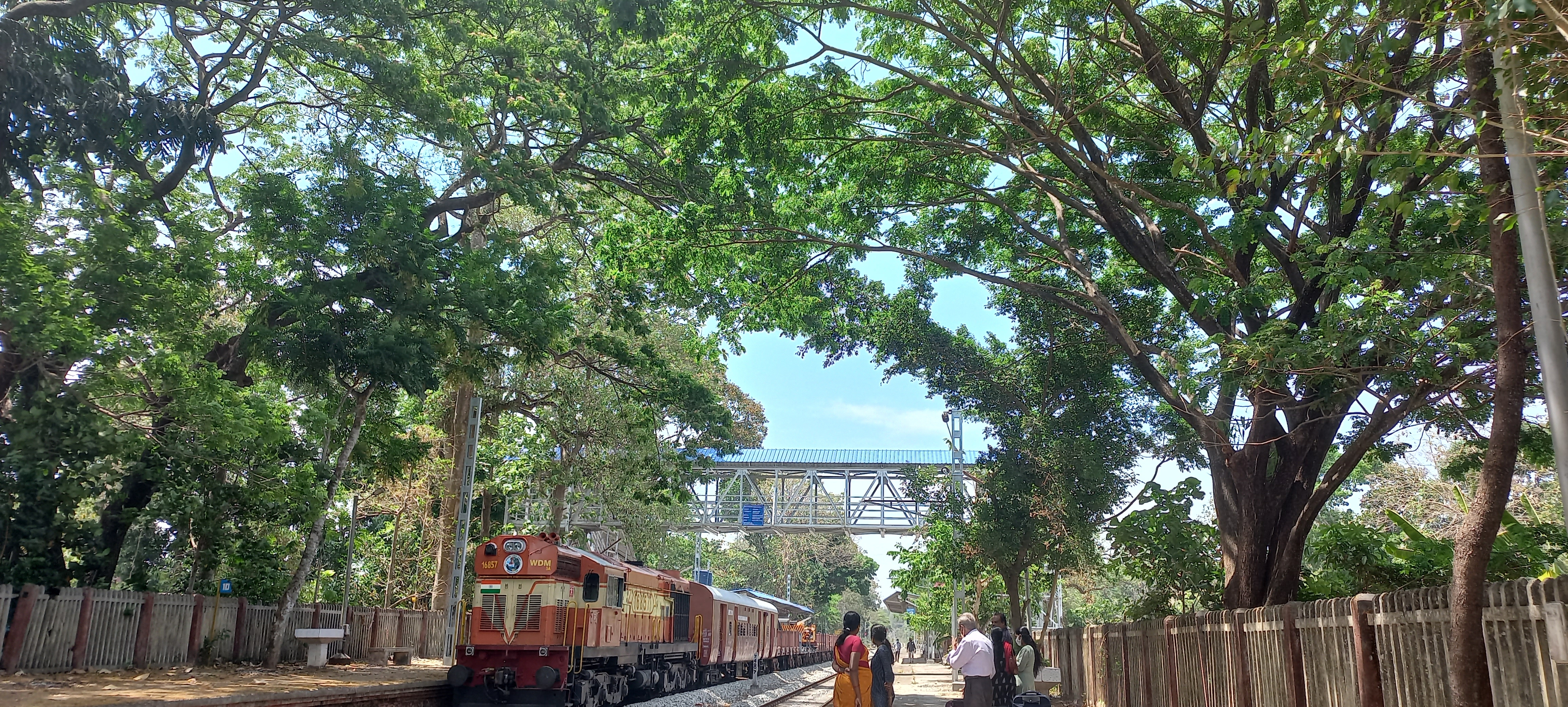
Kundara Railway Station (KUV)

Roadways

The National Highway 744 (India) and National Highway 183 (India) connect the city of Kollam with places in Tamil Nadu such as Madurai and Theni, pass through Kundara.

The nearest airport is Trivandrum International Airport which is 67 km by road.
