= Prakkulam =

- Village
- Kerala, India Prakkulam (India)
- Coordinates: 8.9391°N 76.5821°E
- Country: India
- State: Kerala
- District: Kollam District

Languages
  - Official: Malayalam, English
- Time zone: UTC+5:30 (IST)

Prakkulam is a village in Thrikkaruva Grama Panchayat, Kollam district in the south west Indian state of Kerala, 12 km from Kollam junction railway station.

== See also ==
- Kollam
- List of villages in India
