= Perinad =

- Census Town
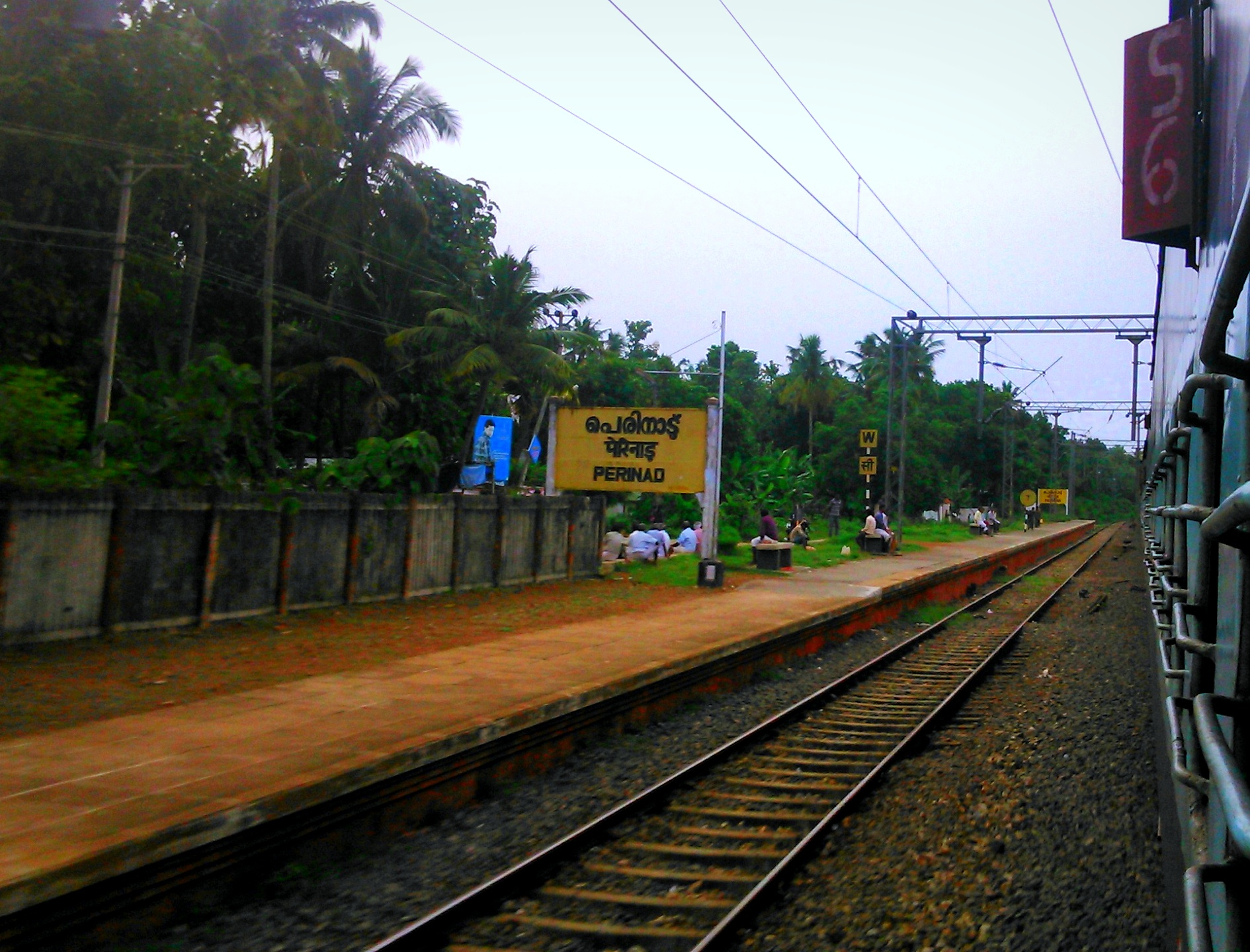
- Railway Station

- Location in Kerala, India Perinad (India)
- Coordinates: 8.956280°N 76.640020°E
- Country: India
- State: Kerala
- District: Kollam

Government
  - Body: Gram Panchayat

Area
  - Total: 13.86 km^{2} (5.35 sq mi)

Population (2011)
  - Total: 35,173
  - Density: 2,538/km^{2} (6,573/sq mi)

Languages
  - Official: Malayalam, English
- Time zone: UTC+5:30 (IST)
- Vehicle registration: KL-02
- Nearest city: Kollam (13 km)
- Lok Sabha constituency: Kollam
- Vidhan Sabha constituency: Kundara

Perinad is a census town in Kollam district in the state of Kerala, India. As of 2011 India census, Perinad had a population of 35,173 with 17,046 males and 18,127 females.

Perinad is a fast-growing village at the outskirts of Kollam city. National Highway 183 (India) connects Perinad region with Kollam, Kundara, Chengannur, etc.

Perinad is situated on the shores of Ashtamudi lake.

The Perinad panchayath office is about 13 km away from Kollam City center. The important towns in the Panchayath are Cherumoodu, Vellimon and Chemmakadu. The panchayath office is located at Chemmakadu. The first boxing academy in the state started by a local body is at Perinad.

The panchayat is witnessing a flurry of developmental activities with the advent of technical and educational institutions like the Fashion Technology Institute, Kerala Institute of Management, the Techno-lodgeRural IT park, and the College of Engineering, Perumon are some of them apart from the private sector educational institutions.

Perinad was once a centre of Coir industry in Kollam which flourished along the backwater shores of the region. The renowned Ashtamudi and Mangad variant of coir are from this region.

== History and Culture ==
Perinad enjoys a significant position in the history of Kerala due to Kallumala Samaram a historic lower caste social revolution movement that took place here in October 1915 under the leadership of Ayyankali.

Perinad is considered as the birthplace of an art form named Seethakali. It is a subaltern rendition of Ramayana which was popular in Kollam - Pathanamthitta district among Vedar and Pulayar community. The art was performed widely during the month of Onam and the revival efforts done on this art form has support of Kerala Folklore Academy.

== Landmarks ==
- Kerala State Institute of Design, Chnathanathope P.O Kollam
- Perinad Techno Lodge (Rural IT Park), Cherumoodu - 13 km away from Kollam City
- Kerala Institute of Management, Chemmakadu - 12 km away from Kollam City
- College of Engineering, Perumon - 13 km away from Kollam City
- Perinad Railway Station - 9 km away from Kollam city (Rail distance)
- Kollam Techno Park, Mulavana, Kundara - 5 km away from Cherumoodu and 18 km away from Kollam city
- Laxmi Starch Factory, Vellimon - 15 km from Kollam City
- Institute of Fashion Technology Kerala, Vellimon - 14.5 km from Kollam City
- Government Higher Secondary School Perinad
- Kuzhiyathu Kavu temple

== Institutions ==
=== KSID ===
The Kerala State Institute of Design (KSID) was established for the purpose of creating a vibrant design community in Kerala through synergistic partnership between artisan community, professional designers and general public. The institute was later merged with Kerala Academy for Skills Excellence (KASE) on 1 April 2014. KASE is the apex agency for all skill development activities in the state of Kerala. One of the most important objectives of KSID is to promote design education. To realise this objective, KSID is supported by National Institute of Design Ahmedabad. NID support includes creation of a comprehensive roadmap for KSID through systematic plan of action to develop and strengthen the organisation, faculty development and offering courses developed by NID.

Institutional Objectives Education: To provide design education and develop professionals excelling in confluence of Design, Technology and Management Skills, who will cater to Public & Private sectors, NGOs as well as small and large scale enterprises functioning throughout the Nation.

Training: To provide outreach programs and Design training in various crafts clusters, MSMEs and other industries as well as to promote local crafts and heritage of the state.

Services: To provide design consultancy services to various Government and Private Institutions and add value to their efforts.

Research: To conduct research in various domains of Design and Allied fields. Documentation & Publication: To periodically document and publish results, in order to generate a Knowledge Repository for Design. Collaboration: To collaborate with Government, Indigenous Industry and to promote Design exchange programmes at national and international level with other Educational Institutes. Awareness: To promote Design sensitivity in the community and impart values of Good Design in all sectors of the society, by organizing and participating in seminars, fairs & workshops and also, to reach out to students of various schools and colleges to create Design Awareness.

=== Techno Lodge ===
A Techno-lodge is a small Information Technology park established by Government of Kerala in a small town or a village in Kerala. Techno-lodges constitute the third tier of the IT infrastructure in Kerala. The Government has set up two such parks in Perinad and Kadakkal Grama Panchayats in Kollam District.

The objective of the Techno-lodges scheme is to encourage IT-enabled Services and Business Process Outsourcing companies to operate from low-cost rural centres and thereby to create employment in rural areas. The Techno-Lodge centres are set up in old unused government buildings, buildings belonging to government organizations, panchayaths or other local bodies.

KSITIL is the main implementing agency for this scheme. The techno-lodge at Perinad is currently not in operation and is closed.

=== Fashion Technology Institute ===
The Centre for Continuing Education Kerala, as part of its key objective on employability enhancement of the youth of the State proposed to offer courses in the field of Fashion Technology, with the technical support of the NIFT by establishing the Institute of Fashion Technology Kerala [IFTK] at Vellimon, Perinad, Kundara in Kollam District. The Perinad Grama Panchayat has transferred a land area of 1.05 acres (4,200 m^{2}) for establishing the institute.

The Centre in consultation with NIFT has devised the following Short Term Courses, for the first phase of its establishment of the Institute of Fashion Technology Kerala.

i) PG Diploma in Fashion Designing – 2 years

ii) PG Diploma in Apparel Production – 2 years

iii) Certificate in Retail, Marketing and Merchandising – 1 year

iv) Certificate in Portfolio Management – 6 months

v) Certificate in Menswear / Womenswear Pattern Making – 6 months

== See also ==
- Anchalumoodu (nearby village)
- Kureepuzha (Perinad)
- Kundara (nearby town)
- Chandanathope (nearby town)
- Vellimon
