= Kundara railway station =

Railway station in Kerala, India

Kundara
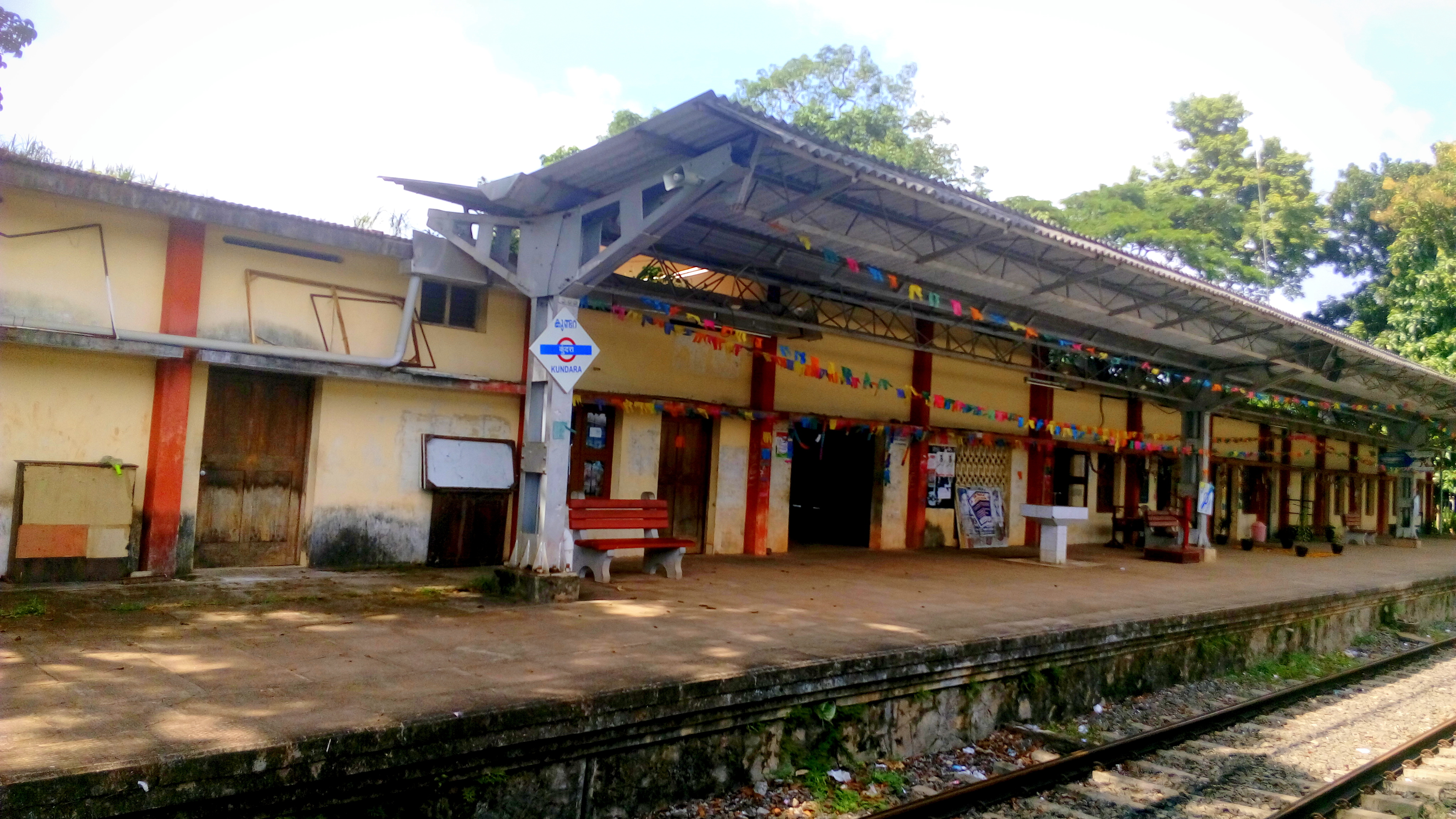

General information
- Location: Elampalloor, Kundara, Kollam, Kerala; India
- Coordinates: 8.96029°N 76.67821°E
- System: Indian Railways station
- Owner: Indian Railways
- Operator: Southern Railway zone
- Line: Kollam–Sengottai branch line
- Platforms: 2
- Tracks: 2

Construction
- Structure type: At–grade
- Parking: Available

Other information
- Status: Functioning
- Station code: KUV
- Zone(s): Southern Railway zone
- Division(s): Madurai
- Fare zone: Indian Railways

History
- Opened: 1904; 122 years ago

Passengers
- 2022–23: 259,448 per year 711 per day
Route map
Location
- Location within India Location within Kerala

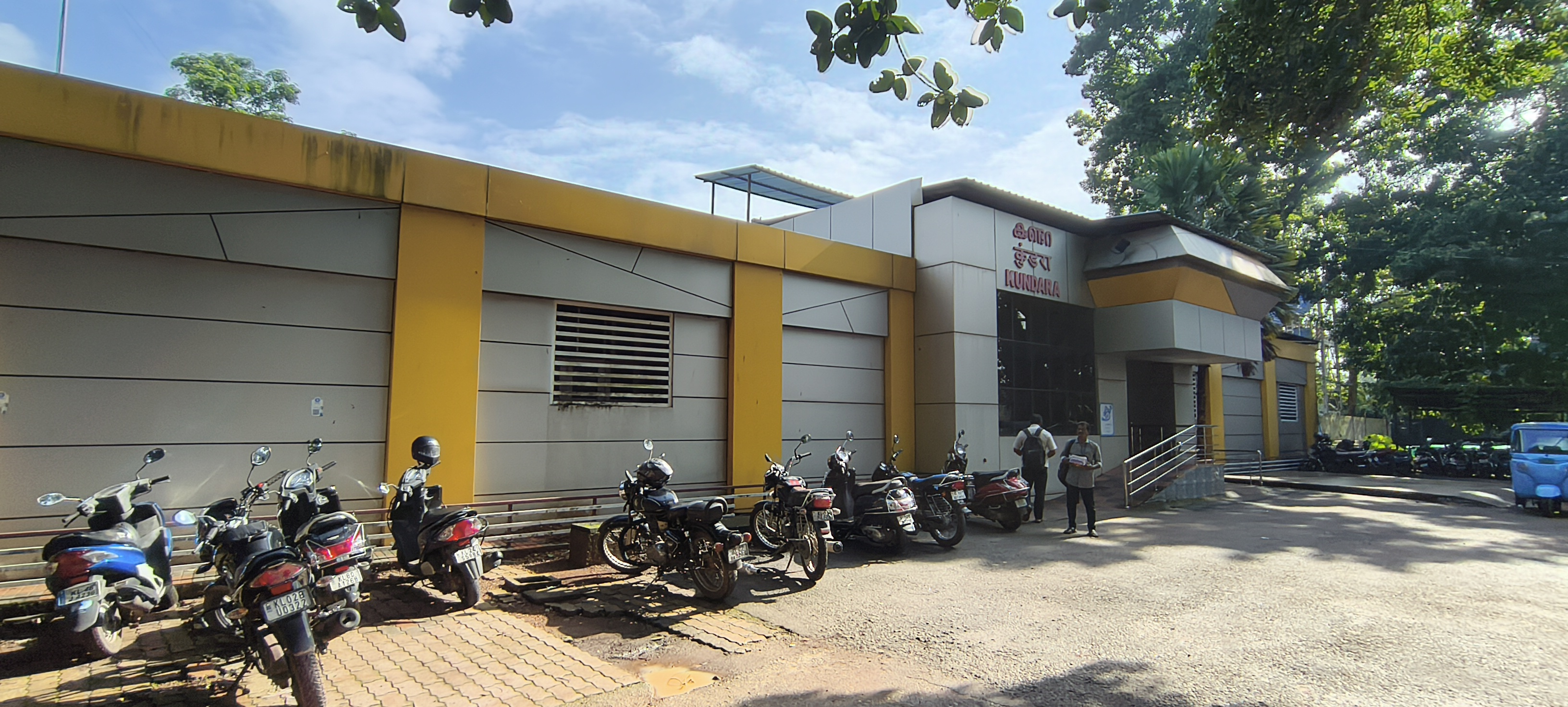
Front view of Kundara railway station

Kundara railway station (station code:KUV) is an NSG–6 category Indian railway station in Madurai railway division of Southern Railway zone, serving the city of Kollam. It serves Kundara, located in Kollam district of the Indian state of Kerala. The station is one among the four railway stations serving the city of Kollam. Other railway stations in the city are Kollam Junction railway station, Kilikollur railway station and Eravipuram railway station.

== Significance ==
Kundara railway station has gained significance because of proximity to Kundara Ceramics Limited, Kollam Technopark, Aluminium Industries Limited (ALIND), Kerala Electrical and Allied Engineering Co. Ltd. (KEL), Lakshmi Starch Ltd., etc. All the trains passing through stop at the station.

== Performance and earnings ==
For the FY 2022–23, the annual earnings of the station were ₹6,613,959 (US$69,000) and daily earnings were ₹18,120 (US$190). For the same financial year, the annual passenger count was 259,448 and daily count was 711. While the footfall per day was recorded as 1005.

== Services ==
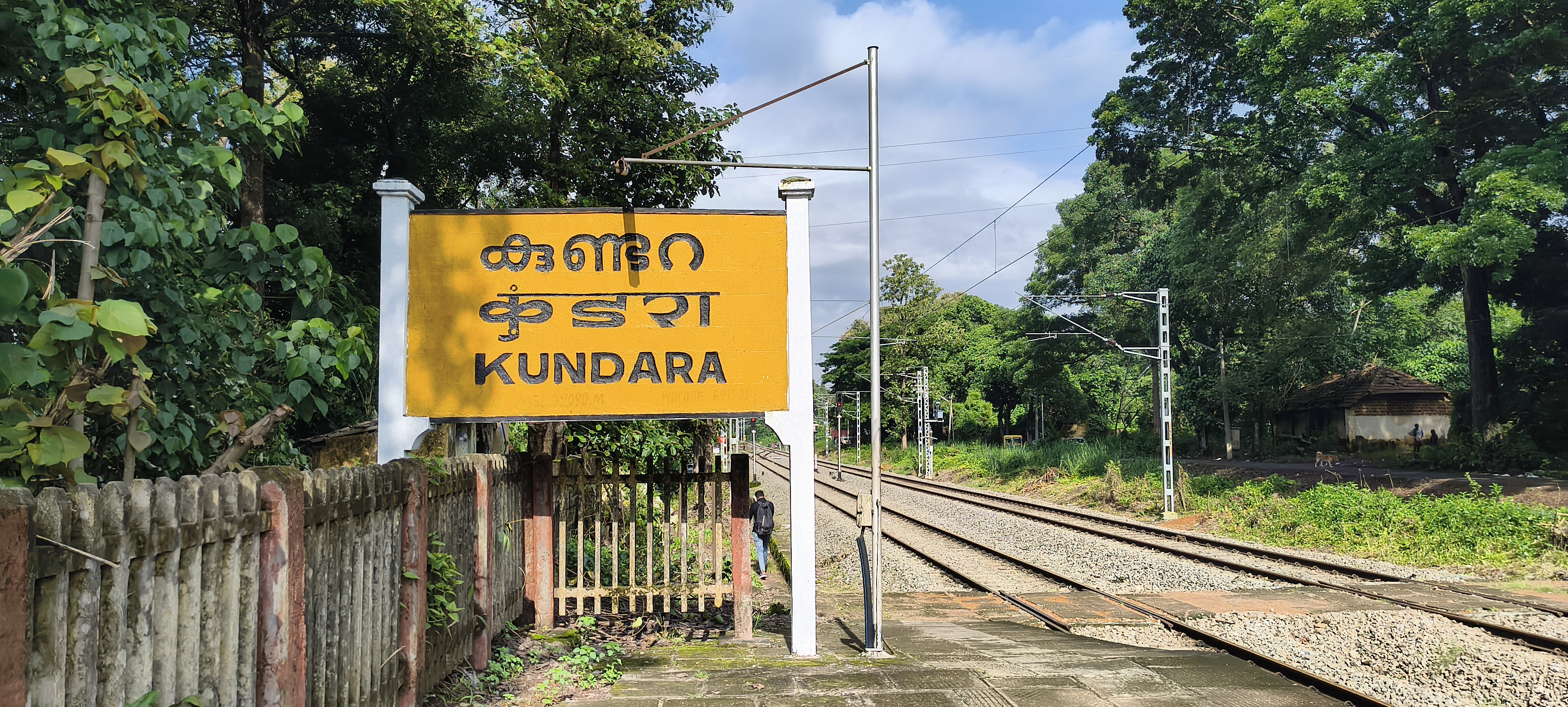
Kundara railway station Sign Board

All 18 passing through trains have a halt at Kundara railway station. Five of these are long distance express trains.

Major express trains on this route -

- Palaruvi Express
- Kollam Mail Express
- Ernakulam–Velankanni Express
- Ernakulam–Velankanni Express via Thanjavur
- Madurai Express
- Madurai - Guruvayur Express
- Punalur - Kanniyakumari Express

These services connect Chennai, Ernakulam, Palakkad, Madurai, Velankanni, Nagarcoil, Kanniyakumari, Thanjavur and Tuticorin cities with Kundara.

== See also ==
- List of railway stations in India
