= Kerala Film Critics Association Awards 2022 =

Annual Indian film awards ceremony

46th Kerala Film Critics Association Awards
- Organized by: Kerala Film Critics Association

The 46th Kerala Film Critics Association Awards, recognising excellence in the Malayalam films released in 2022, were announced in May 2023.

== Winners ==
=== Main awards ===
- Best Film: Headmaster (Rajeevnath), B 32 Muthal 44 Vare (Shruthi Sharanyam)
- Best Actor: Kunchacko Boban - Nna Thaan Case Kodu
- Best Actress: Darshana Rajendran - Jaya Jaya Jaya Jaya Hey, Purusha Pretham
- Best Director: Mahesh Narayanan - Ariyippu
- Second Best Film: Vettapattikalum Ottakarum
- Best Popular Film: Nna Thaan Case Kodu, Malikappuram
- Best Supporting Actor: Thampy Antony (Headmaster), Alencier Ley Lopez (Appan)
- Best Supporting Actress: Hannah Reji Koshy (Kooman), Garggi Ananthan (Ekan Anekan)
- Best Screenplay: Shihabuddin Poythumkadavu and Sunny Joseph (Bhoomiyude Uppu), Shruthi Sharanyam (B 32 Muthal 44 Vare)
- Best Story: M. Mukundan (Mahaveeryar)
- Best Music Director: Kavalam Sreekumar (Headmaster)
- Best Lyricist: Vinayak Sasikumar (Ini Utharam, My Name is Azhagan, The Teacher, Keedam)
- Best Background Score: Ronnie Raphael (Headmaster)
- Best Male Playback Singer: K. S. Harisankar - "Enthinente Nenjinullile" from Aanandam Paramanandam, Ravisankar - "Mazhayil" from Maadan
- Best Female Playback Singer: Nithya Mammen - "Aayiraththiri" from Headmaster
- Best Cinematographer: Abraham Joseph (Kumari)
- Best Editor: Sreejith Sarang (Jana Gana Mana)
- Best Child Artist: Master Akash Raj (Headmaster), Baby Deva Nandha (Malikappuram)
- Best Art Director: Jotish Shankar (Ariyippu, Malayankunju)
- Best Sound Recording: Vishnu Govind (Malayankunju)
- Best Makeup Artist: Amal Chandran (Kumari)
- Best Costume Design: Dhanya Balakrishnan (Pathonpatham Noottandu)
- Best Children's Film: 5 Seeds, Standard V-B
- Best Film on National Integration: Saudi Vellakka
- Best Biographical Film: Ayisha
- Best Historical Film: (Pathonpatham Noottandu)
- Best Film on Environment: Vellarikka Pattanam, Akkuvinte Padachon
- Best Non-Malayalam Film: Ponniyin Selvan: I

=== Honorary awards ===
- Chalachitra Ratnam Award: K. P. Kumaran
- Ruby Jubilee Award: Kamal Haasan
- Chalachitra Prathibha Award: Shobana, Vijayaraghavan, Vineeth, Gayathri Ashokan, Mohan D. Kurichy
