= Headmaster (2022 film) =

2022 Indian Malayalam language film

- Directed by: T. Rajeevnath
- Written by: T. Rajeevnath; K. B. Venu
- Story by: Karoor Neelakanta Pillai
- Produced by: Sreelal Devaraj
- Starring: Thampy Antony; Babu Antony; Manju Pillai
- Cinematography: Praveen Panicker
- Edited by: Beena Paul
- Music by: Kavalam Sreekumar
- Production company: Channel Five Media
- Release date: 29 July 2022
- Country: India
- Language: Malayalam

Headmaster is a 2022 Indian Malayalam-language drama film directed by T. Rajeevnath and written by K. B. Venu and Rajeevnath, based on the short story "Pothichoru" by Malayalam writer Karoor Neelakanta Pillai. The film stars Thampy Antony in the title role, alongside Babu Antony, Akash Raj, Jagadish, Manju Pillai and Devi. Produced by Sreelal Devaraj under the banner of Channel Five Media, the film was released in theatres on 29 July 2022. In the Kerala Film Critics Association Awards 2022, it received awards for Best Film, Best Director, Best Supporting Actor, Best Child Artist, Best Music Director, Best Background Score and Best Female Playback Singer.

== Development ==
The film is based on "Pothichoru", a short story by Malayalam writer Karoor Neelakanta Pillai. The film is set in a period when poverty and hunger were widespread in Kerala, consumerism was largely unknown, and teachers received low salaries and sometimes upaid for long but continued in their profession out of dedication.

In the story, there is a letter written by the headmaster to the school manager with regret after he steals and eat a child's food due to hunger. Rajeevnath created the character Sreedharan from the name of his son mentioned in it and developed the story into a feature film with screenwriter K. B. Venu, by adapting the original narrative by introducing Sreedharan, the headmaster's son, as a central character and presenting the events partly through his childhood memories. The character of the headmaster's wife, who has only a brief presence in the original story, was also given a more prominent role in the film.

After preliminary discussions, filming of Headmaster began in early 2022 and was completed in a single schedule over a short period. The shooting, which started on January 15, 2022, in Thiruvananthapuram and its surroundings was completed on January 23.

The screenplay, originally titled "Onnam Sir", was written by Rajeevnath and K. B. Venu several years before the film was announced. Mohanlal had initially agreed to play the headmaster after expressing interest in the story, but the project did not progress due to technical issues and later Indrans was considered for the role, but that version also did not progressed.

The film is produced by Sreelal Devaraj and is produced under the banner of Channel Five. Praveen Panicker handled cinematography and Beena Paul served as the editor.

== Music ==
The film features music composed by Kavalam Sreekumar, son of poet and theatre personality Kavalam Narayana Panicker. It was his debut as a film music composer. The lyrics were written by Prabha Varma, and the songs were sung by P. Jayachandran and Nithya Mammen.

== Plot ==
The film depicts a headmaster's struggle against adverse circumstances to promote education in the Kerala during the 1950s.

The film follows a headmaster who, unable to bear his hunger, steals and eats a student's wrapped lunch. The story unfolds through the memories of Sreedharan, his son, who later becomes a senior official at the United Nations and a human rights activist. Through his recollections, the film depicts his father's struggles with poverty, the hardships he endured during his childhood and the guilt that eventually led him to take his own life.

== Cast ==
- Thampy Antony as K. Ramakrishna Menon, the headmaster
- Babu Antony as R. Sreedharan Menon, the headmaster's son
- Akash Raj as young Sreedharan Menon
- Manju Pillai as Meenakshi
- Jagadish as Karunakaran
- Madhupal as Pramod
- Shankar Ramakrishnan as Shibu
- Sanju Sivaram as Madhusoodhanan Kurup
- Prem Kumar as Shashankan
- Balaji Sarma as Sugunan
- Sethu Lakshmi as Sreedharan's grandmother
- Devi Nair as Diya
- Mini K. S. as Dakshayani Amma

== Release ==
Headmaster was released in theatres on 29 July 2022. The film's makers intended it to be watched by all students, teachers and families across Kerala. As part of this initiative, the first screening on the opening day was made free of charge to the public.

== Reception ==
In her review in The Hindu, Saraswathy Nagarajan noted that the film's moving storyline was its strength, although it worked only in parts. Writing for Mathrubhumi, Ratheesh Babu described Headmaster as a story of a father defeated by fate and a son who overcame it, and noted that the film will leave a lasting emotional impact on viewers.

In his review for ManoramaOnline, Sreekumar K., who had been involved in the production of eight feature films as a partner of Fifth Element Films, described Headmaster as a "class film". In another review for ManoramaOnline, former Doordarshan director Baiju Chandran described Headmaster as a film that recalled the golden age of Malayalam cinema, when literary adaptations played a significant role. He praised the choice of Karoor Neelakanta Pillai's short story "Pothichoru" and noted that the film retained the emotional intensity of the original story. He also highlighted the performances of Thampy Antony, Babu Antony and Manju Pillai, and described the film as a tribute to Karoor and a reminder of the hardships faced by teachers during that period.

== Awards and honours ==
At the 46th Kerala Film Critics Association Awards 2022, Headmaster received seven awards, including Best Film, Best Director (Rajeevnath), Best Supporting Actor (Thampy Antony), Best Child Artist (Akash Raj), Best Music Director (Kavalam Sreekumar), Best Background Score (Ronnie Raphael) and Best Female Playback Singer (Nithya Mammen).
