= Sufiyum Sujatayum (soundtrack) =

Soundtrack album by M. Jayachandran
- Released: 4 July 2020
- Recorded: 2020
- Genre: Feature film soundtrack
- Length: 31:33
- Languages: Malayalam; Hindi
- Label: Friday Music Company
- Producer: M. Jayachandran

M. Jayachandran chronology
Mamangam (2019)	Sufiyum Sujatayum (2020)	Pathonpatham Noottandu (2022)

Sufiyum Sujatayum is the soundtrack to the 2020 Malayalam-language romantic drama film of the same name directed by Naranipuzha Shanavas and produced by Friday Film House, starring Jayasurya. The film's soundtrack consisted of 10 songs composed by M. Jayachandran with lyrics written by B. K. Harinarayanan, Manoj Yadav and Kollam Shafi. It was released by Friday Music Company on 4 July 2020.

== Development ==
M. Jayachandran had an exposure to Sufi music, having listened to the qawwali and ghazals of Nusrat Fateh Ali Khan, Sabri brothers, Aziz Mian, Begum Akhtar and Ghulam Ali in his childhood, and wanted to do a film which had scope for Sufi music, as it had its Arabic and Middle Eastern-influences. When Shanavas approached him for composing the music, he eventually agreed as the film's script had its scope for implementing the genre. During pre-production, Jayachandran read the script to understand each situations of the songs and the mood of the story, before curating the album. Shanavas marked certain instances where the film need musical interludes and were recorded even before the film began production. According to Jayachandran, the film had "lot of passages where there are no dialogues" which are eventually constructed by the music. He listened to compositions from Turkish ensemble and Arabic composers, curated by Shanavas, to have an understanding in Sufi music.

Jayachandran collaborated with musicians from Istanbul for recording the score, which he described it as the first time he had worked with international musicians and called it as "an unforgettable experience". After recording the song "Vathikkalu Vellaripravu", Jayachandran had no idea on whom would be suitable for recording the vocals but felt that it should be a newcomer. Nithya Mammen and Arjun Krishna were brought on board to perform the song, after being suggested by fellow singer Ravisankar. The song was penned by B. K. Harinarayanan with Urdu chants written by Kollam Shafi and performed by Zia-Ul-Haq. All the songs in the film were written and composed simultaneously.

== Release ==
On 26 June 2020, the music video of "Vathikkalu Vellaripravu" was released by Dulquer Salmaan, Nani and Karthi through their social media handles before uploading it to YouTube. Jayachandran described it as "a poignant song that brings out the innocence and endearment of new-found love and companionship". Picturised on the romantic relationship between Mohan and Hydari's characters, the song was released as a digital single the same day. The second song "Alhamdulillah" was released as a single on 30 June 2020, with an accompanying music video. The film's soundtrack, featuring four musical numbers with three instrumental themes used the background score and three instrumental versions from the film's songs were released under the production house's subsidiary music label, Friday Music Company on 4 July 2020, after the film.

== Track listing ==
No.	Title	Lyrics	Singer(s)	Length
1.	"Vathikkalu Vellaripravu"	B. K. Harinarayanan, Kollam Shafi	Nithya Mammen, Arjun Krishna, Zia-Ul-Haq	4:13
2.	"Alhamdulillah"	B. K. Harinarayanan	Sudeep Palanad, Amrutha Suresh	5:05
3.	"Doorie"	Manoj Yadav	Madhuvanthi Narayanan	2:30
4.	"Azan The Light – Allahu Akbar"	Traditional	Zia-Ul-Haq	1:55
5.	"Clarinet Theme"	—	M. Jayachandran	1:15
6.	"Bus Theme"	—	M. Jayachandran	2:20
7.	"End Title Theme"	—	M. Jayachandran	2:31
8.	"Vathikkalu Vellaripravu" (Instrumental)	—	M. Jayachandran	4:06
9.	"Alhamdulillah" (Instrumental)	—	M. Jayachandran	5:05
10.	"Doorie" (Instrumental)	—	M. Jayachandran	2:30
Total length:				19:51

== Reception ==
Sanjith Sridharan of The Times of India wrote that Jayachandran's music "doesn't just complement but enhances the narrative". Lalithaa Krishnan of The Hindu felt that the film's music "recreates an age of innocence with emotive intensity". Karthik Kumar of Hindustan Times described the music as "soul-stirring". Nitya Punnackal of Manorama Online called that Jayachandran's "soulful music" is interwoven with the visuals and in sync with the narrative. Sowmya Rajendran of The News Minute praised Jayachandran's compositions as they "uplift the film" but felt that the background score is being "repetitive". Sarath Ramesh Kuniyl of The Week called the music being the film's "saving grace" with "M. Jayachandran has invoked the Sufi spirit admirably"; he also admitted the background score is reminiscent of that of Gopi Sundar's work in Ennu Ninte Moideen (2015). Divya Nair of Rediff.com called Jayachandran's music being "noteworthy" and the lyrics "mesmerizing", whereas Shubhra Gupta of The Indian Express described that the music "works in parts".

== Accolades ==
Award (Note: Awards, festivals and organizations are in alphabetical order.)	Date of ceremony (Note: Date is linked to the article about the awards held that year, wherever possible.)	Category	Recipient(s)	Result	Ref.
Filmfare Awards South	9 October 2022	Best Music Director – Malayalam	M. Jayachandran	Won	
Filmfare Awards South	9 October 2022	Best Female Playback Singer – Malayalam	Nithya Mammen – ("Vaathikkalu Vellarippravu")	Nominated	
J. C. Daniel Film Award	15 November 2021	Best Music Director	M. Jayachandran	Won	
Kerala Film Critics Association Awards	13 September 2021	Best Music Director	M. Jayachandran	Won	
Kerala State Film Awards	16 October 2021	Best Music Director – Songs	M. Jayachandran	Won	
Kerala State Film Awards	16 October 2021	Best Music Director – Score	M. Jayachandran	Won	
Kerala State Film Awards	16 October 2021	Best Female Playback Singer	Nithya Mammen – ("Vaathikkalu Vellarippravu")	Won	
South Indian International Movie Awards	18–19 September 2021	Best Lyricist – Malayalam	B. K. Harinarayanan – ("Vathikkalu Vellaripravu")	Nominated	
South Indian International Movie Awards	18–19 September 2021	Best Male Playback Singer – Malayalam	Sudeep Palanad – ("Alhamdulillah")	Nominated	
South Indian International Movie Awards	18–19 September 2021	Best Female Playback Singer – Malayalam	Nithya Mammen – ("Vaathikkalu Vellarippravu")	Won	
