= Phoenix (2023 film) =

2023 Indian film

- Theatrical release poster
- Directed by: Vishnu Bharathan
- Screenplay by: Midhun Manuel Thomas
- Story by: Vishnu Bharathan; Bigil Balakrishnan (story concept)
- Produced by: Rinish K. N.
- Starring: Chandhunadh; Aju Varghese; Anoop Menon
- Cinematography: Alby
- Edited by: Nithish K. T. R.
- Music by: Sam C. S.
- Production company: Front Row Productions
- Distributed by: Central Pictures
- Release date: 17 November 2023
- Running time: 132 minutes
- Country: India
- Language: Malayalam

Phoenix is a 2023 Indian Malayalam-language romantic horror film directed by Vishnu Bharathan in his directorial debut and written by Midhun Manuel Thomas from a story by Vishnu. It stars Chandhunadh, Aju Varghese and Anoop Menon, alongside Bhagath Manuel, Abhirami Bose, Asha Aravind and Aji John in supporting roles. The music was composed by Sam C. S. Set in the 1990s, it narrates the unusual circumstances faced by Advocate. John Williams and his family when they start living in a mysterious house.

Principal photography commenced in May 2023 in Mahe and wrapped up in June 2023.

== Plot ==
In the 1990s, Adv. John Williams moves to a house by the sea in Thuruthikkadavu with his wife Daisy and their three children due to some personal reasons. After starting to live there, John receives several letters written to a person named Freddy from an unknown address and experiences some strange things. When John discusses the matter with his friend Amir, Amir tells him to immediately vacate the house and to go meet Thomas, the house owner, to get back the rent paid in advance.

John learns from Thomas's servant that the house in which they now live is built in a place that was formerly used as a graveyard. Along with his wife and children, John temporarily moves to Amir's house and while staying there, he receives another letter and decides to go back to find out who Freddy is. One night, after returning home, John's children are frightened by something and the youngest child, Tittu, later suffers from fever. Upon Daisy's request, John meets Fr. Geo Kuttikkadan to inquire about Freddy and requests that he come to his house to pray for the cure of Tittu's fever.

A doctor informs Fr. Geo Kuttikkadan that Tittu has symptoms of cholera and that it is not advisable to visit John's house. Later, Fr. Geo Kuttikkadan finds out that Freddy was mentioned as the groom in the betrothal invitation of a girl named Margaret in 1971 and informs John about her. John and Amir meet Margaret, a doctor at present, and learn that Freddy didn't marry her and that she is married to a doctor named Rajeev. With the help of Peter, a parish clerk, John and Amir meet Fr. Francis, who came back from Rome after being diagnosed with blood cancer. When John shows one of the letters he received, Fr. Francis recognises it as Anna Rose George's letter and narrates her and Freddy's story.

In the 1970s, Freddy, a PhD student who is the son of a wealthy person named Mathew, falls in love with Anna Rose George, an orphan brought up by a priory in Kochi. With her savings, Anna starts a homestay in Thuruthikkadavu, while Freddy's family arranges a marriage proposal for him with Margaret, an MBBS student. Anna loses her place at the priory after the priory learns about her relationship with Freddy. Soon, Freddy leaves his house and starts living with Anna in her homestay. Upon his father's advice, Freddy goes to Madras to submit the dissertation and to defend viva. When Margaret arrives in Madras to do her post-graduation, Freddy starts a relationship with her.

Cholera begins to spread in Thuruthikkadavu and Anna dies after contracting the disease from one of her guests. With believers accusing Anna of defying the church's rules, Fr. Francis buries her body near her homestay instead of the common graveyard. The next morning, when Fr. Francis opens Anna's grave, he finds scratches on the coffin and realises that she was not actually dead and that she died due to the rain and the wet mud flooding the coffin, thereby drowning her.

With Fr. Francis's help, John and Amir arrive at Freddy's house and give Anna's letters to Freddy's mother. After John returns home, Anna's soul enters the body of Mariya, John's elder daughter, and she asks about Freddy. Freddy arrives there and tells Anna that he didn't intentionally avoid her, but suddenly, Anna leaves Mariya's body. John and his family later move to a new house, while Freddy stays there with the hope that Anna will someday forgive him and talk to him once again.

== Cast ==
- Chandhunadh as Freddy Matthew
- Aju Varghese as Advocate. John Williams
- Anoop Menon as Fr. Francis
- Bhagath Manuel as Ameer, John's Friend
- Abhirami Bose as Anna Rose George, Freddy's love interest
- Nilja K. Baby as Daisy John
- Baby Aavni as Mariya
- Jess Sweejan as Lidiya
- Abram Ratheesh as Tittu
- Asha Aravind as Sister Aneetta
- Aji John as Mathew, Freddy's Father
- Sini Abraham as Freddy's Mother
- Devendranath as Dr. Tharakan
- Aradhya Ann as Margaret
- Ranjini as Margaret's Mother
- Rajan Pootharakkal as Peter Kapyar
- Zhinz Shan as Fr. Geo Kuttikadan
- Paul D. Joseph as Kapyar
- Premananandan as Kadakkaran
- Aroop Sivadas as Broker
- Rahul Nair R. as Thomas
- Favor Francis as Adv. Ibrahim
- Anju as Ameer's wife

== Production ==
The film was officially announced in April 2023. Produced by Front Row Productions, it was their second production after Twenty One Gms (2022). Directed by debutant Vishnu Bharathan, Midhun Manuel Thomas wrote the screenplay for this film.

Principal photography commenced in May 2023 in Mahe. It was also shot in Kannur and Thalasserry. Filming was wrapped up in June 2023.

== Release ==
The film was released on 17 November 2023. Amazon Prime Video bought the digital rights and began streaming it on 22 December 2023.

== Reception ==
=== Critical response ===
The film received mixed to positive reviews from critics and audiences.

Anandu Suresh of The Indian Express gave 3.5 out of 5 stars and wrote, "Phoenix has adeptly established a new standard for Malayalam horror movies, which is still haunted by the ghosts of their past." Sajin Shrijith of Cinema Express gave 2.5 out of 5 stars and wrote, "Phoenix is yet another case of plot revelations overshadowing the performances and storytelling."

Princy Alexander of Onmanorama wrote, "Phoenix leaves us emotionally shaken, yet yearning for the tension and the fear that gripped us in the first half." Sanjith Sidhardhan of OTTPlay gave 4 out of 5 stars and wrote, "Phoenix steers clear of the usual cliches that accompany a horror film, and this investment of both time and layered writing, pays off brilliantly." A critic of Times Now gave 3 out of 5 stars and wrote, "Phoenix is a sure-shot hit, generating heightened expectations and excitement among audiences for this unique cinematic experience."
