= Optica (journal) =

- Discipline: Optical science, photonics
- Language: English
- Edited by: Prem Kumar

Publication details
- History: 2014–present
- Publisher: Optica
- Frequency: Monthly
- Open access: Yes
- Impact factor: 8.5 (2024)

Standard abbreviations
- ISO 4: Optica

Indexing
- ISSN: 2334-2536
- OCLC no.: 1843247545

Links
- Journal homepage; Online access; Online archive

Optica is a monthly peer-reviewed open access scientific journal published by Optica. It covers the entire spectrum of theoretical and applied optics and photonics. It was established in July 2014. The founding editor-in-chief was Alexander Gaeta (Columbia University).

In 2020, the editor-in-chief became Prem Kumar (Northwestern University, USA), assisted by an extended team of Deputy Editors: Thomas Krauss (University of York, England), Curtis Menyuk (University of Maryland, Baltimore County, USA), Irina Novikova (College of William & Mary, USA), Nathalie Picqué (Max Planck Institute of Quantum Optics, Germany) and Eric Potma (University of California, Irvine, USA).

== Abstracting and indexing ==
The journal is abstracted and indexed in:

- Chemical Abstracts Service
- Current Contents/Physical, Chemical & Earth Sciences
- Science Citation Index Expanded

According to the Journal Citation Reports, the journal has a 2023 impact factor of 8.5.
