= Michal Lipson =

American physicist (born 1970)

- Born: 1970 (age 55–56)
- Education: University of São Paulo; Technion (BSc, MSc, PhD)
- Spouse: Alexander Gaeta
- Scientific career
- Workplaces: Columbia University; Cornell University; MIT
- Doctoral students: Amy C. Foster; Sasikanth Manipatruni

Michal Lipson (born 1970) is an American-Israeli-Brazilian physicist known for her work on silicon photonics. A member of the National Academy of Sciences since 2019 and the National Academy of Engineering since 2025, Lipson was named a 2010 MacArthur Fellow for contributions to silicon photonics especially towards enabling GHz silicon active devices. Until 2014, she was the Given Foundation Professor of Engineering at Cornell University in the school of electrical and computer engineering and a member of the Kavli Institute for Nanoscience at Cornell. She is now the Eugene Higgins Professor of Electrical Engineering at Columbia University. In 2009 she co-founded the company PicoLuz, which develops and commercializes silicon nanophotonics technologies. In 2019, she co-founded Voyant Photonics, which develops next generation lidar technology based on silicon photonics. In 2022, Lipson was a co-founder of Xscape photonics to accelerate AI, ML, and simulation hardware. In 2020 Lipson was elected the 2021 vice president of Optica (formerly the Optical Society), and she served as the Optica president in 2023.

== Education ==
Lipson was born in Haifa, Israel. After spending two years as an undergraduate student at the Instituto de Física at the University of São Paulo, she continued at the Technion – Israel Institute of Technology, where she earned a BSc in physics in 1992, followed by an MSc in 1994 and a PhD in 1998, both also in physics. Her doctoral research focused on "Coupled Exciton-Photon Modes in Semiconductor Optical Microcavities". Lipson then spent 2 years as a postdoctoral associate with Lionel Kimerling at MIT, and then accepted a position at Cornell University in 2001.

== Career and research ==
Lipson is best known for her work on silicon photonics. She developed (along with other researchers around the world at IBM, Intel, Ghent University) silicon photonic components such as waveguide couplers, ring resonators, modulators, detectors, WDM wavelength sources and sensors on silicon platform. She published the first paper on a class of versatile waveguides known as Slot-waveguides in 2004, which has since been cited over one thousand times. In all her work has been cited 32,373 times (as of January 18, 2018). She was also the first to demonstrate optical parametric gain in silicon, which was considered an important step towards building optical amplifiers in silicon.

Lipson's McArthur fellowship citation mentions her work in ring modulators (circular waveguides) as the key contribution of Lipson via the continued refinement of both opto-electronic and purely optical circuits for smaller size, increased efficiency, and accelerated switching speed The resulting silicon-based photonic integrated circuits have the potential to improve signal transmission and processing dramatically.

Lipson has received numerous honors, including being the recipient of a Fulbright Fellowship and an National Science Foundation CAREER Award. She is also an elected fellow of Optica. Her current research interests include optical metamaterials, low-power and compact optical modulators, and slot waveguides. Her work has appeared in Nature, Nature Photonics, and other journals.

== Awards and honors ==
- 2005: National Science Foundation Career Award
- 2008: Optical Society fellow
- 2010: Blavatnik Award
- 2010: MacArthur Fellow
- 2013: Fellow of the Institute of Electrical and Electronics Engineers "For contributions to design and applications of nanoscale photonic devices"
- 2015: Thomson Reuters top 1 percent highly cited researcher in the field of Physics
- 2017: R. W. Wood Prize – Optica
- 2018: Awarded an honorary Doctor of Science (Sc.D.) by Trinity College Dublin
- 2019: IEEE Photonics Award
- 2019: NAS Comstock Prize in Physics
- 2019: Elected member of the National Academy of Sciences
- 2021: OSA John Tyndall Award in recognition of her fundamental and technological advances in integrated photonic devices
- 2025: Elected member of the National Academy of Engineering

== Selected works ==
- Slot waveguides:
  - V. R. Almeida; Qianfan Xu; C. A. Barrios; M. Lipson (2004). "Guiding and Confining Light in Void Nanostructure". Optics Letters. 29 (11): 1209–11. Bibcode:2004OptL...29.1209A. doi:10.1364/OL.29.001209. PMID 15209249.
  - Chen, L., Shakya, J. and Lipson, M. (2006). "Subwavelength confinement in an integrated metal slot waveguide on silicon". Optics Letters. 31 (14): 2133–2135. Bibcode:2006OptL...31.2133C. doi:10.1364/OL.31.002133. PMID 16794703.
- Frequency combs
  - J. S. Levy, A. Gondarenko, M. A. Foster, A. C. Turner-Foster, A. L. Gaeta, M. Lipson, "CMOS-compatible multiple-wavelength oscillator for on-chip optical interconnects." Nature Photonics 4, 37–40 (2010).
  - B. Stern, X. Ji, Y. Okawachi, A. L. Gaeta, M. Lipson, "Battery-operated integrated frequency comb generator". Nature. 562, 401 (2018).
  - A. Dutt, C. Joshi, X. Ji, J. Cardenas, Y. Okawachi, K. Luke, A. L. Gaeta, M. Lipson, "On-chip dual-comb source for spectroscopy". Science Advances 4, e1701858 (2018).
- Ultralow-loss silicon and silicon nitride
  - J. Cardenas, C. B. Poitras, J. T. Robinson, K. Preston, L. Chen, M. Lipson, "Low loss etchless silicon photonic waveguides". Optics Express. 17, 4752–4757 (2009).
  - K. Luke, A. Dutt, C. B. Poitras, M. Lipson, "Overcoming Si3N4 film stress limitations for high quality factor ring resonators". Optics Express. 21, 22829–22833 (2013).
  - A. Griffith, J. Cardenas, C. B. Poitras, M. Lipson, "High quality factor and high confinement silicon resonators using etchless process". Optics Express, 20, 21341–21345 (2012).
  - X. Ji, F. A. S. Barbosa, S. P. Roberts, A. Dutt, J. Cardenas, Y. Okawachi, A. Bryant, A. L. Gaeta, M. Lipson, "Ultra-low-loss on-chip resonators with sub-milliwatt parametric oscillation threshold". Optica, 4, 619–624 (2017).
- Nonlinear optics in silicon
  - Foster, M.A., Turner, A.C., Sharping, J.E., Schmidt, B.S., Lipson, M. and Gaeta, A.L. (2006). "Broadband Optical Parametric Gain on a Silicon Photonic Chip". Nature. 441 (7096): 960–3. Bibcode:2006Natur.441..960F. doi:10.1038/nature04932. PMID 16791190. S2CID 205210957.
  - Foster, M.A., Salem, R., Geraghty, D.F., Turner-Foster, A.C., Lipson, M. and Gaeta, A.L. (2008). "Silicon-chip-based ultrafast optical oscilloscope". Nature. 456 (7218): 81–84. Bibcode:2008Natur.456...81F. doi:10.1038/nature07430. PMID 18987739. S2CID 205215220.
- Modulation in silicon
  - Almeida, V. R., Barrios, C. A., Panepucci, R. R., Lipson, M. (2004). "All-optical control of light on a silicon chip". Nature. 431 (7012): 1081–1084. Bibcode:2004Natur.431.1081A. doi:10.1038/nature02921. PMID 15510144. S2CID 4404067.
  - Xu, Q., Schmidt, B., Pradhan, S. and Lipson, M. (2005). "Micrometre-scale silicon electro-optic modulator". Nature. 435 (7040): 325–327. Bibcode:2005Natur.435..325X. doi:10.1038/nature03569. PMID 15902253. S2CID 4302523.
  - Manipatruni S; Preston, K.; Chen, L.; Lipson, M. (2010). "Ultra-low voltage, ultra-small mode volume silicon microring modulator". Optics Express. 18 (17): 18235–18242. Bibcode:2010OExpr..1818235M. doi:10.1364/OE.18.018235. PMID 20721214.
  - Manipatruni S, Lipson, M. and Young, I.A., 2013. Device scaling considerations for nanophotonic CMOS global interconnects. IEEE Journal of Selected Topics in Quantum Electronics, 19(2), pp. 8200109-8200109.
