= 180 (soundtrack) =

Soundtrack album by Sharreth
- Released: 14 April 2011 (Tamil); 21 April 2011 (Telugu)
- Recorded: 2010–2011
- Genre: Feature film soundtrack
- Length: 31:37
- Language: Telugu; Tamil
- Label: Think Music
- Producer: Sharreth

Sharreth chronology
Kushti (2010)	180 (2011)	Thalsamayam Oru Penkutty (2012)

180 is the soundtrack to the 2011 film of the same name starring Siddharth, Nithya Menen, Priya Anand and directed by Jayendra Panchapakesan in his feature directorial debut. The film featured music composed by Sharreth, and had seven songs written by Madhan Karky and Viveka in Tamil, and Vanamali in Telugu. The soundtrack, which was distributed by Think Music, a subsidiary of the Indian multiplex chain Sathyam Cinemas (which was one of the film's producers), released on 14 April 2011 at a launch event in Chennai, while the Telugu version was unveiled a week later. The soundtrack met with positive response from critics and audience, particularly the song "Nee Korinaal", receiving nominations for Best Lyricist for Karky, and Best Female Playback Singer for Shweta Mohan at the 59th Filmfare Awards South.

== Development ==
The film marked Sharreth's third Tamil film after Magic Magic 3D (2003) and June R (2006), and his second in Telugu after Kalavaramaye Madilo (2009). Due to his consecutive collaborations with Jayendra in advertisements, where he would share a great rapport with the latter, he had agreed to be part of the project. Sharreth recalled that he had almost composed over 180 songs for the film as he could give several ideas and options for the music. Jayendra claimed that the songs on the film were based on the concepts, which created the lyrics and transformed the visuals calling the music being a "treat to watch". Each songs were conceived for specific situations.

Sharreth was asked to compose the film in tune with the slow-paced visuals of the films. Despite his rapport with Jayendra, he found it difficult it to satisfy him owing to his straightforwardness, admitting that "every time, when I compose a song thinking that it would be a great tune, Jayendra would call it a thrash after listening to it." He noted that he had to change tunes for numerous times at Jayendra's insistence or when he had changed the concept of the song. Throughout composing and recomposing, he found himself with "a kitty full of tunes, enough to last [him] quite a while".

The song "Rules Kidayathu" was shot with the Phantom Flex camera, upon Jayendra's insistence, by slowing down the visuals; Jayendra said the "speaks about the little moments in life which we fail to enjoy." The film also featured a Portuguese number entitled "Continua" which was initially planned to be included in the soundtrack but was later omitted. Sharreth and Jayendra decided to record the track in Portugal for the authenticity, but due to time constraints, they brought in Brazilian singer Eliabe D Freitas to perform the track. Karky used an online translating tool to write the lyrics in Portuguese as he was unfamiliar with the language. He then cross-checked the lyrics with a Portuguese person, who claimed that the lyrics were "wonderful" and that Jayendra had to modify only 15 per cent of the film, for grammatical errors. Jayendra also said that the song plays an integral part in the film's events as "the film has a Portuguese connection and the song fits the film’s context quite well".

== Release ==
The soundtrack for the Tamil version of the film was intended to be launched on 31 March 2011, but instead the album was released on the occasion of Tamil New Year (14 April 2011) at Sathyam Cinemas, with director Mani Ratnam, cinematographer P. C. Sreeram, actors Arya, Jayam Ravi and Shiva and the film crew felicitating the event. The soundtrack for the Telugu version was launched on 21 April 2011 at Prasad Labs in Hyderabad, with the presence of Ram, Shruti Hassan, Sunil, producer Allu Aravind, Shyam Prasad Reddy, Daggubati Suresh Babu, director B. V. Nandini Reddy.

As a part of the promotions, Swaroop Reddy, the CEO of Think Music launched an e-store for the label, where the tracks could be purchased for the price that customers quote, a new concept for the Indian music industry. The songs were made available on the store upon its release.

== Track listing ==
=== Tamil ===
All lyrics are written by Madhan Karky, except where noted.

No.	Title	Singer(s)	Length
1.	"Rules Kidaiyathu"	Tippu	4:54
2.	"AJ"	Vidhu Prathap, Ramya Sundaresan Kapadia	4:45
3.	"Santhikkadha Kangalil Inbangal"	K. S. Chithra, S. Sowmya, Unni Menon	3:38
4.	"Rathe Rathe Bajan"	Ramya Sundaresan Kapadia, Ravisankar	1:37
5.	"Nyaayam Thana" (lyricist: Viveka)	Sharreth	4:16
6.	"Nee Korinaal"	Karthik, Shweta Mohan	5:06
7.	"Siru Siru Kanavugal"	S. Vidhyashankar, Master Aswath, P. Ajith, Master Sharath	3:04
8.	"Continua"	Eliabe D Freitas	4:17
Total length:			31:37

=== Telugu ===
All lyrics are written by Vanamali.

No.	Title	Singer(s)	Length
1.	"Ee Vayasika Raadhu"	Tippu	4:54
2.	"AJ"	Vidhu Prathap, Ramya S. Kapadia	4:45
3.	"Ninna Leni"	K. S. Chithra, S. Sowmya, Anand Aravindakshan	3:38
4.	"Radhe Radhe"	Ramya S. Kapadia, Ravisankar	1:37
5.	"Moonnaalle"	Sharreth	4:16
6.	"Nee Maatalo"	Karthik, Shweta Mohan	5:06
7.	"Padha Padhamandhi"	S Vidhyashankar, Master Aswath, P. Ajith, Master Sharath	3:04
8.	"Continua"	Eliabe D Freitas	4:17
Total length:			31:37

== Critical reception ==
The soundtrack received positive reviews. Pavithra Srinivasan of Rediff gave the album a score of three stars out of five and quoted "Sharreth seems to be a music composer who doesn't play by the rules; he veers this way and that in his songs, which actually provides spice and makes for an interesting listening experience." Karthik Srinivasan of Milliblog reviewed the film being "unconventional in every way, right from the title to all its songs" and called the music as "enchanting". Vipin Nair of Music Aloud rated the album 8.5/10, calling it as "one of Sharreth’s best works in recent times that sees him in fabulous touch."

N. Venkateswaran of The Times of India wrote "Sharreth makes a buzzing entry into Kollywood, coaxing even the much-reviled vuvuzela to sound musical in 'Rules kidayathu' (Tipu). The music director, a household name in Kerala, proves that he does not play by the rules by coming up with a motley mix of songs in 'Sandhikaadha kangalil inbangal' (Chithra, S Sowmya and Unni Menon) and 'Nee korinal' (Karthik and Swetha Menon), which are based on classical ragas, and the melodious 'AJ' (Ramya S Kapadia and Vidhu Prathap), which is interspersed with Spanish lyrics." Reviewer based at CNN-IBN wrote "Sharreth's music is imaginative. The songs 'AJ' and 'Ne Korinal' are noteworthy." Karthik Subramanian of The Hindu stated "The music by Sharreth passes muster." Mihir Fadnavis of Daily News and Analysis found the music to be "overly dramatic".

== Accolades ==
Award	Date of ceremony (Note: Date is linked to the article about the awards held that year, wherever possible.)	Category	Recipient(s) and nominee(s)	Result	Ref.
Filmfare Awards South	7 July 2012	Best Female Playback Singer – Tamil	Shweta Mohan for "Nee Korinaal"	Nominated	
Filmfare Awards South	7 July 2012	Best Lyricist – Tamil	Madhan Karky for "Nee Korinaal"	Nominated	
Mirchi Music Awards South	4 August 2012	Listener's Choice Award − Song	"Nee Korinaal"	Won (3rd place)	
Vijay Awards	16 June 2012	Best Music Director	Sharreth	Nominated	
Vijay Awards	16 June 2012	Best Female Playback Singer	Shweta Mohan for "Nee Korinaal"	Nominated	
