= Anu Mohan =

Anu Mohan may refer to:

- Anu Mohan (Malayalam actor) (born 1990), Indian actor who works in Malayalam films
- Anu Mohan (Tamil actor) (born 1957), Indian actor and director who has worked in Tamil language films
