= Ravi Shankar (disambiguation) =

Ravi Shankar (1920–2012) was an Indian musician and sitar virtuoso.

Ravi Shankar may also refer to:

- Ravi (composer) (1926–2012), Ravi Shankar Sharma, Indian film score composer
- Ravi Shankar (spiritual leader) (born 1956), Indian spiritual leader
- Ravi Shankar (poet) (born 1975), former faculty member of Central Connecticut State University
- Ravisankar, South Indian playback singer
- P. Ravi Shankar (born 1966), Indian actor and dubbing artist
- Ravi Shankar Prasad (born 1954), Indian Minister of Communications and Information Technology
- Ravi Shankar (cartoonist), Indian author and cartoonist

== See also ==
- Ravishankar (disambiguation)
