= Ravishankar =

Ravishankar, Ravisankar, or Ravishanker may refer to

== People ==
- Ravi Shankar, Hindustani classical composer, musician
- Ravi Shankar (spiritual leader) Indian Spiritual Leader
- Ravisankar, Indian playback singer
- Ravishankar Gowda, Indian actor who works in the Kannada film industry
- Ravishankar Puvendran Canadian Cricketer
- Ravishankar Raval, Indian painter, art critic and journalist
- Ravishankar Shukla, Indian National Congress Leader
- K. Ravisankar, Indian politician
- P. Ravi Shankar, Indian actor, dubbing artist, director and a writer
- Nalini Ravishanker, Indian statistician
- Shanmuganathan Ravishankar, LTTE Head of Intelligence

== Other uses ==
- Pandit Ravishankar Shukla Stadium, a cricket ground in Durg
- Pandit Ravishankar Shukla University, Chhattisgarh
- Ravishankar Shukla Stadium, sports venue in Jabalpur

== See also ==
- Ravi Shankar (disambiguation)
