= Amy C. Foster =

American engineer

- Born: Amy Carole Turner
- Education: Cornell University; University at Buffalo
- Scientific career
- Workplaces: Johns Hopkins University; Cornell University
- Thesis: Parametric nonlinear optics in silicon waveguides : applications and optimization (2009)
- Website: Integrated Photonics Laboratory

Amy Carole Foster (née Turner) is an American engineer who is an associate professor in the Department of Electrical and Computer Engineering at Johns Hopkins University. Her work considers nonlinear optics, nanoscale design and silicon-based photonic devices.

== Early life and education ==
Foster studied electrical engineering at the University at Buffalo. She moved to Cornell University for her graduate studies, where she worked with Michal Lipson. Her doctoral research looked at nonlinear optics in silicon waveguides. After earning her doctorate, Foster worked as a postdoctoral fellow at Cornell University.

== Research and career ==
In 2010, Foster joined the faculty at Johns Hopkins University. Her research considers the development of silicon-based photonic devices for new technologies. For the encryption of data, Foster developed a nonlinear photonic crystalline disk with input and output waveguides. This device configuration allows for the reproducible scrambling of signals, which creates specific keys for various information inputs. She has received funding from numerous organizations including the Intelligence Advanced Research Projects Activity (IARPA), the National Science Foundation (NSF), Applied Physics Laboratory (APL), and the Defense Advanced Research Projects Agency (DARPA).

Such devices are almost impossible to clone, and reliably generate a large number of keys for the secure transmission of data. Foster has served as an Associate Editor of Optics Express since 2016 and was appointed The Optical Society Siegman International Summer School lecturer in 2018.

== Awards and honors ==
- 2012 DARPA Young Faculty Award
- 2016 Johns Hopkins University Catalyst Award

== Selected publications ==
- Jacob S. Levy; Alexander Gondarenko; Mark A. Foster; Foster, Amy Carole; Gaeta, Alexander Luis; Lipson, Michal (2009). "CMOS-compatible multiple-wavelength oscillator for on-chip optical interconnects". Nature Photonics. 4 (1): 37–40. doi:10.1038/nphoton.2009.259. Wikidata Q56004567.
- Foster, Mark; Foster, Amy Carole; Jay E Sharping; Bradley S Schmidt; Lipson, Michal; Gaeta, Alexander Luis (2006). "Broad-band optical parametric gain on a silicon photonic chip". Nature. 441 (7096): 960–3. Bibcode:2006Natur.441..960F. doi:10.1038/nature04932. PMID 16791190. Wikidata Q28247698.
- Foster, Mark; Reza Salem; David F Geraghty; Foster, Amy Carole; Lipson, Michal; Gaeta, Alexander Luis (2008). "Silicon-chip-based ultrafast optical oscilloscope". Nature. 456 (7218): 81–84. Bibcode:2008Natur.456...81F. doi:10.1038/nature07430. PMID 18987739. Wikidata Q34873865. (o)
