= King of Kotha (soundtrack) =

2023 soundtrack album

- Malayalam edition cover

Soundtrack album by Jakes Bejoy and Shaan Rahman
- Released: 23 August 2023
- Recorded: 2022–2023
- Genre: Feature film soundtrack
- Length: 27:02
- Languages: Malayalam; Tamil; Telugu
- Label: Sony Music
- Producers: Jakes Bejoy; Shaan Rahman
External audio
- Audio Jukebox on YouTube

Jakes Bejoy chronology
Padmini (2023)	King of Kotha (2023)	Garudan (2023)

Shaan Rahman chronology
Kolla (2023)	King of Kotha (2023)	Bullet Diaries (2023)

Singles from King of Kotha
- 1. "Kalapakkaara" Released: 28 July 2023; 2. "Ee Ulakin" Released: 18 August 2023

King of Kotha is the soundtrack to the 2023 film of the same name directed by Abhilash Joshiy and produced by Dulquer Salmaan's Wayfarer Films and Zee Studios, starring Salmaan in the lead role. The film score is composed by Jakes Bejoy, who also contributed five songs for the soundtrack with Shaan Rahman composing three songs. The lyrics for the songs were written by Muhsin Parari, Asal Kolaar, Roll Rida, Joe Paul, Fejo, Manu Manjith and Travis King, whereas Mani Amudhavan, Krishna Kanth, Rambabu Gosala, Kunwar Juneja, did the same for the dubbed Tamil, Telugu and Hindi versions, respectively. After being preceded by two singles, the soundtrack was released under the Sony Music India label on 23 August 2023, a day prior to the film's release.

== Background ==
King of Kotha is Bejoy's second and Rahman's maiden association with Salmaan. Bejoy added that the due to Salmaan's popularity across languages, he wanted the film's music to have a wide appeal. Hence, the use of artists from various states had to be essential; the song "Kotha Raja" had Chennai-based rapper Asal Kolaar, and Hyderabad-based Roll Rida performing rap verses for the song which was predominantly had Malayalam lyrics. The song "Kalapakkaara" was composed with the intention of being popular in Instagram Reels and YouTube Shorts.

The musical score had a North Indian element which blended with the western orchestra. Bejoy began recording the film's background score by June 2023 and completed it within mid-August. He eventually took specific importance on recording music for the promotional materials—the themes featured in the motion poster ("People of Kotha") and teaser were released separately. The theme "People of Kotha" had two more renditions apart from the original versions: an "edgy" and "contemporary" version. Salmaan also provided him suggestions on designing the themes and background score, so that it could suit the film well.

Before signing King of Kotha, Rahman worked on nearly six to seven films, where he would compose one or two songs a day. This had affected him professionally slowing his progress on composition, where he described it to be a composer's block. When Abhilash signed Rahman for the film, a friend of the composer asked him on he would provide pre-composed music for the film, which had offended him. Eventually, Rahman composed three songs for the film, to overcome the creative slowdown.

== Release ==
Sony Music India acquired the film's music rights for around ₹2–6 crore ($US240,000–600,000). (Note: The Times of India initially reported the sale of the film's audio rights to be ₹2 crore (US$210,000), whereas OTTPlay and India Today reported it to be ₹6 crore (US$620,000).) The theme song "People of Kotha", which had vocals and lyrics by Travis King, and featured in the film's motion poster was released separately, as well as the teaser theme.

On 28 July 2023, Salmaan's birthday, the makers unveiled the song "Kalapakkaara" as the first single from the album; an item number, featuring Salmaan and Ritika Singh, the song is performed by Benny Dayal, Shreya Ghoshal and rapper Fejo. The track "Ee Ulakin" was released as the second single on 18 August, it is a romantic number picturized on Salmaan and Aishwarya Lekshmi and the song was performed by Sreejish Subramanian.

The eight-song soundtrack was released on 23 August 2023, a day before the film's release.

== Reception ==
Anandu Suresh of The Indian Express wrote "Jakes Bejoy's background score too is dominant in the technical side of King of Kotha. Unlike the criticism faced by the recent action thriller Jailer for the overuse of the Alappara theme, Jakes creates distinct tracks for different moments and employing the main King of Kotha theme only as needed. Throughout the film, his tracks shine consistently, offering a cohesive experience in line with its tone." Sajin Shrijith of The New Indian Express summarized: "Jakes Bejoy's fittingly rousing score acts as a neat cushion without being intrusive." Janani K. of India Today wrote "Jakes Bejoy's score elevates every single mass sequence." Ronak Kotecha of The Times of India described the "thumping background score by Jakes Bejoy is like icing on the cake".

Regarding the song "Kotha Raja", the critic reviewed it as "The song's pulsating beats and catchy melody evidently strike a chord with the masses". While the song was appreciated by netizens, it was criticized for its poor placement. Some were also critical on Rahman's three of the compositions being excluded from the film.

== Track listing ==
Malayalam edition track listing
No.	Title	Lyrics	Music	Singer(s)	Length
1.	"Kotha Raja"	Muhsin Parari, Asal Kolaar, Roll Rida	Jakes Bejoy	Asal Kolaar, Dabzee, Roll Rida, Resmi Sateesh	4:33
2.	"Kalapakkaara"	Joe Paul, Fejo	Jakes Bejoy	Shreya Ghoshal, Benny Dayal, Jakes Bejoy, Fejo	4:12
3.	"Ee Ulakin"	Manu Manjith	Shaan Rahman	Sreejish Subramanian	4:02
4.	"King of Kotha" (Title Track)	Fejo	Shaan Rahman	Fejo, Nithya Mammen	3:02
5.	"Doore"	Manu Manjith	Shaan Rahman	Sreejish Subramanian, Shaan Rahman	3:52
6.	"People of Kotha"	Travis King	Jakes Bejoy	Travis King, Shatadru Kabir, Anand Sreeraj, Jakes Bejoy, Niranj Suresh, Srikrishna Vishnubhotla	1:32
7.	"King of Kotha" (Teaser Theme)	Instrumental	Jakes Bejoy	Instrumental	1:38
8.	"Kalapakkaara" (Karaoke)	Instrumental	Jakes Bejoy	Instrumental	4:12
Total length:					27:02

Tamil edition track listing
No.	Title	Lyrics	Music	Singer(s)	Length
1.	"Kalaattaakaaran"	Mani Amudhavan	Jakes Bejoy	Jakes Bejoy, Benny Dayal, Haritha Balakrishnan	4:12
2.	"En Uyire"	Mani Amudhavan	Shaan Rahman	Sathyaprakash	4:02
3.	"Kotha Raja"	Muhsin Parari, Asal Kolaar, Roll Rida	Jakes Bejoy	Asal Kolaar, Dabzee, Roll Rida, Resmi Sateesh	4:33
4.	"King of Kotha" (Title Track)	Mani Amudhavan	Shaan Rahman	Yogi Sekar, Nithya Mammen	3:02
5.	"Neere"	Mani Amudhavan	Shaan Rahman	Kapil Kapilan	3:52
6.	"People of Kotha"	Travis King	Jakes Bejoy	Travis King, Shatadru Kabir, Anand Sreeraj, Jakes Bejoy, Niranj Suresh, Srikrishna Vishnubhotla	1:32
7.	"King of Kotha" (Teaser Theme)	Instrumental	Jakes Bejoy	Instrumental	1:38
Total length:					22:50

Telugu edition track listing
No.	Title	Lyrics	Music	Singer(s)	Length
1.	"Hallaa Machaare"	Krishna Kanth	Jakes Bejoy	Jakes Bejoy, L. V. Revanth, Sindhuja Srinivasan	4:12
2.	"Naa Oopire"	Rambabu Gosala	Shaan Rahman	Srikrishna Vishnubhotla	4:02
3.	"Kotha Raja"	Muhsin Parari, Asal Kolaar, Roll Rida	Jakes Bejoy	Asal Kolaar, Dabzee, Roll Rida, Resmi Sateesh	4:33
4.	"King of Kotha" (Title Track)	Rambabu Gosala	Shaan Rahman	Aditya Iyengar, Nithya Mammen	3:02
5.	"Neere"	Naresh Mamindla	Shaan Rahman	Naresh Mamindla	3:52
6.	"People of Kotha"	Travis King	Jakes Bejoy	Travis King, Shatadru Kabir, Anand Sreeraj, Jakes Bejoy, Niranj Suresh, Srikrishna Vishnubhotla	1:32
7.	"King of Kotha" (Teaser Theme)	Instrumental	Jakes Bejoy	Instrumental	1:38
Total length:					27:02

Hindi edition track listing
No.	Title	Lyrics	Music	Singer(s)	Length
1.	"Jala Jala Hai"	Kunwar Juneja	Jakes Bejoy	Jakes Bejoy, Sahil Solanki, Shilpa Surroch	4:12
2.	"Yeh Dil Mera"	Kunwar Juneja	Shaan Rahman	Amit Mutreja	4:02
3.	"King of Kotha" (Title Track)	Kunwar Juneja	Shaan Rahman	Varun Likhate, Nithya Mammen	3:02
4.	"Aankhein"	Kunwar Juneja	Shaan Rahman	Bhanu Pratap Singh	3:52
5.	"People of Kotha"	Travis King	Jakes Bejoy	Travis King, Shatadru Kabir, Anand Sreeraj, Jakes Bejoy, Niranj Suresh, Srikrishna Vishnubhotla	1:32
6.	"King of Kotha" (Teaser Theme)	Instrumental	Jakes Bejoy	Instrumental	1:38
Total length:					27:02

== Background score ==
King of Kotha

Film score by Jakes Bejoy
- Released: 15 September 2023
- Recorded: 2022–2023
- Genre: Film score
- Length: 27:02
- Label: Sony Music
- Producer: Jakes Bejoy

The film's original score, which consisted of 53 tracks running for one hour, was released by Sony Music India on 15 September 2023.

King of Kotha (Original Background Score)
No.	Title	Artist(s)	Length
1.	"This Is Kotha"		1:02
2.	"Raju's Childhood"		1:53
3.	"SI Shahul Hameed"		0:20
4.	"Kannan and Team"		0:45
5.	"King Killer"		0:46
6.	"K Team"		0:31
7.	"Shahul Insulted"		1:20
8.	"Eye for an Eye"		0:37
9.	"Manju"		0:47
10.	"Glorious Past"		0:38
11.	"Friendship Theme"		0:32
12.	"Kotha Ravi"		0:35
13.	"King's Arrival"		1:27
14.	"Ranjith Bhai"		0:59
15.	"Gandhigram Entry"	Travis King	1:32
16.	"Rathinakallu"	Kapil Kapilan	0:43
17.	"Tara"		0:20
18.	"Football in Kotha"		1:59
19.	"Library Love"		1:03
20.	"Happy Birthday Ponnu"		0:39
21.	"There for You"		1:09
22.	"Ranjith's Gift"		1:20
23.	"Godown Fight"		1:17
24.	"Broken Love"		1:41
25.	"Leaving Kotha"		1:32
26.	"Shahul's Plan"		0:32
27.	"In Lucknow"		1:34
28.	"Back in Kotha"		1:09
29.	"All of Them Gone"		0:55
30.	"Kannan Meets Madrassi"		0:53
31.	"This Is Not the Old Kotha"		0:59
32.	"Matriculation to PHD"		1:41
33.	"Rathinakallu" (Reprise)	Kapil Kapilan	1:28
34.	"Manju's Plan"		2:15
35.	"K Team's Fight"		5:10
36.	"Father's Death"		1:33
37.	"Where is Raju?"		0:50
38.	"Attack in Disguise"		0:42
39.	"Target 1"		0:40
40.	"Payback"		2:05
41.	"Face to Face"		0:25
42.	"Return of the King"		0:57
43.	"POV Fight"		0:57
44.	"Raju's Fury"		0:50
45.	"Kotha Blaze"		1:08
46.	"The Faceoff"		0:57
47.	"Kannan Pleads"		0:45
48.	"Ranjith's Son"		1:38
49.	"You Were the One"		0:59
50.	"Conclusion"		1:03
51.	"Shimla"		1:02
52.	"Dev Gujjar"		0:50
53.	"Raju Madrassi"	Travis King	2:24
Total length:			61:36
