= Anu Agarwal =

Indian-American optoelectronics engineer

Anuradha Murthy (Anu) Agarwal is an Indian-American electrical engineer specializing in photonic integrated circuits. She is a principal research scientist at the Massachusetts Institute of Technology (MIT), in the Electronic Materials Research Group of MIT's Microphotonics Center and Materials Research Laboratory.

== Education and career ==
Agarwal is originally from India; her mother was a botanist and her father was an academic and documentary filmmaker. She earned a doctorate in electrical engineering from Boston University in 1994. Next, she became a postdoctoral researcher at MIT, working there with Lionel Kimerling, and has remained there since, with the exception of three years from 2001 to 2004 working with Clarendon Photonics, where she was developing a novel optical filter.

== Recognition ==
Agarwal was named a Fellow of Optica, in the 2022 class of fellows, "for pioneering contributions to integrated mid-infrared photonic sensing, detection, imaging, and leadership in training the next generation in photonics manufacturing".
