= Prem Kumar =

Prem Kumar is an Indian name and ma refer to:

- Prem Kumar (Malayalam actor), Indian actor in Malayalam films
- Prem Kumar (Tamil actor), Indian actor in Tamil films
- Prem Kumar (Konkani actor), Indian actor in Konkani films
- Prem Kumar (footballer) (born 1989), Indian footballer
- Dr. Prem Kumar (born 1960), Indian politician
- Prem (Kannada actor) or Prem Kumar, Indian actor in Kannada films
- Prem Kumar (academic), American academic and Professor at Northwestern University
- Swami Premananda (guru), Indian guru Prem Kumar (1951–2011), convicted of multiple rapes and a murder

== See also ==
- Prem Kumar (film), a 2023 Indian film
