= Last 6 Hours =

- Poster in Tamil
- Directed by: Sunish Kumar
- Story by: Suresh Tuticorin
- Produced by: Anoop Khalid
- Starring: Bharath; Adil Ibrahim; Anu Mohan; Anoop Khalid; Viviya Santh
- Cinematography: Sinu Sidharth
- Edited by: Praveen Prabhakar
- Music by: Kailas Menon
- Production company: Lazy Cat Productions
- Release date: 5 August 2022
- Country: India
- Languages: Malayalam; Tamil

Last 6 Hours is a 2022 Indian bilingual thriller film written Suresh Tuticorin and directed by Sunish Kumar. Shot in Malayalam and Tamil, the film was produced by the studio, Lazy Cat Productions. The film stars Bharath, Adil Ibrahim, Anu Mohan and Viviya Santh in leading roles.

The film's music is composed by Kailas Menon, with cinematography handled by Sinu Sidharth and editing done by Praveen Prabhakar. The Tamil version of the film was released in theatres on 5 August 2022.

== Plot ==
Shaun Morris is a naval officer who joins hands with his fiancée Rachel to set up a trap to take revenge on Luke, Shameer, Jaison, and Rahul, the robbers who killed his family

== Cast ==
- Bharath as Shaun Morris
- Adil Ibrahim as Rahul
- Anu Mohan as Shameer
- Anoop Khalid as Luke
- Viviya Santh as Elizabeth
- Neena Kurup as Mother

== Production ==
The film's shoot was completed in 11 March 2020. The teaser of the film was launched by Arya and Tovino Thomas.

== Soundtrack ==
No.	Title	Music	Singer(s)	Length
1.	"Nedunaali Nenjil / Theruvoram"	Kailash Menon	Nithya Mammen, Niranj Suresh

== Release ==
The Tamil version of the film had a theatrical release on 5 August 2022. A reviewer from Times of India noted "people who haven't watched Don't Breathe might find Last 6 Hours interesting, however, for others, it's a passable thriller that tries way too hard to keep the audience on the edge". A critic from Outlook wrote "on the whole, Last Six Hours might not be as brilliant as Don't Breathe but it definitely is thrilling and makes you hold your breath in fear and anticipation".Maalai Malar critic gave 3 out of 5 rating and wrote that "Director Sunishkumar has narrated the story briskly."
