= Orkut Oru Ormakoot =

2012 Malayalam film

- Official poster
- Directed by: Manoj-Vinod
- Produced by: Johny Sagariga
- Starring: Rima Kallingal; Arjun Ashokan; Ben Alex; Jo Malayil; Vishnu G Raghav; Anu Mohan
- Cinematography: Swaroop Philip
- Edited by: Mentos Antony
- Music by: Leela L Girish Kuttan, Sangeetha Varma
- Release date: 5 January 2012
- Country: India
- Language: Malayalam

Orkut Oru Ormakoot (transl. Orkut is a memory) is a 2012 Indian Malayalam-language romantic drama film directed by Manoj-Vinod. The film stars Rima Kallingal, Arjun Ashokan, Jo Malayil (son of Sibi Malayil), Ben Alex (son of actor Lalu Alex), Anu Mohan and Vishnu G Raghav (son of still photographer R.Gopalakrishnan).

== Cast ==
- Rima Kallingal as Christelle a.k.a. Crystal
- Arjun Ashokan as Ganeshan
- Ben Alex as Aby
- Jo Malayil as Ronnie
- Vishnu G Raghav
- Anu Mohan as Sooraj
- Siddique
- Nedumudi Venu
- Jagathy Sreekumar
- Suraj Venjaramoodu
- Arundathi Nag
- Vanitha Krishnachandran

== Music ==
The music for the film was composed by Leela L Girish Kuttan and Sangeetha Varma(Sarvam Brahmamayam)

Track listing
No.	Title	Lyrics	Singer(s)	Length
1.	"Mazhavilthoni"	Santhosh Varma	Sudeep Kumar, Rimi Tomy, Nikhil Mathew	4:16
2.	"Sayaahnamegham"	Rafeeq Ahamed	Vijay Yesudas	6:19
3.	"Hey Pularoli"	Rafeeq Ahamed	Afsal	5:07
4.	"Machilakkaavile"	Sreeprasad	M. G. Sreekumar, Durga Viswanath	4:40
5.	"Ambadithannilorammayundangane"	Santhosh Varma	Lekha R. Nair	2:34
6.	"Lifil Fifty Fifty"	Sudeep Joshy	Madhu Balakrishnan, Biju Narayanan, Franko	4:02
7.	"Sarvam Brahmamayam"	—	Sangeetha Varma	2:50
Total length:				29:48

== Reception ==
A critic from Sify opined that "Orkut Oru Ormakkoottu tries to say lots of things, but doesn't really succeed in doing it in an impressive way and ends being predictable, preachy and even insipid. 2011 had begun with Traffic, which had definitely raised the bar with its brilliance, but no such luck with the first release of 2012. That is sad!" Paresh C. Palicha of Rediff.com wrote: "One can only hope that Orkut Oru Ormakoot is the last film made on the worn-out theme of the abuse of the internet and the disadvantages of an urban lifestyle".
