= Secret Home =

- Theatrical release poster
- Directed by: Abhayakumar K.
- Written by: Anil Kurian
- Produced by: Santhosh Thrivikraman; Shibu Job; Aneesh C. Salim
- Starring: Sshivada; Chandhunadh; Aparna Das; Anu Mohan
- Cinematography: Ajay David Kachappilly
- Edited by: Rajesh Rajenndrran
- Music by: Sankar Sharma
- Distributed by: Wow Cinemas
- Release date: 22 March 2024 (india)
- Running time: 117 minutes
- Country: India
- Language: Malayalam

Secret Home is a 2024 Malayalam-language drama crime film written by Anil Kurian and directed by Abhayakumar K. The film was produced by Santhosh Thrivikraman, Shibu Job, and Aneesh C. Salim. The film features Sshivada, Chandhunadh, Aparna Das and Anu Mohan in lead roles.

== Plot ==
The story is about a teacher, who, despite experiencing hallucination, looks to find out the truth about a mother and the serious allegations being levelled against her. What makes the plot interesting is that the hallucinations that she experiences are partly true.

== Cast ==
- Sshivada as Sarika
- Chandhunadh as Saran
- Aparna Das as Ayana
- Anu Mohan
- Maala Parvathi
- Darshana S. Nair

== Release ==
The first release date of Secret Home was 15 March 2024, but later it was postponed to 22 March 2024. It was released theatrically on 22 March 2024.

== Reception ==
Vivek Santhosh from The New Indian Express rated this film two out of five stars and said "Adding to its woes, Secret Home's screenplay felt like it was written backwards after finalising on its derivative plot twist. Even the technical aspects don't come together to help mask the flaws of a film that is confused on what it ultimately wants to convey".

Times Now rated this film 3 1/2 stars out of 5 stars and said "Ajay David Kachappilly's visuals are striking and add to the intensity of the plot while Sankar Sharma's music enhances the mood. Director Abhayakumar K delivers a crime thriller that is reasonably well made". Gayathri Krishna from OTTplay rated this film three out of five stars and said "Overall, Secret Home has every component needed to be a strong thriller drama, but it does not quite manage to leave the audience with a lasting impression. Still, some of the performances in this movie really shine".
