= Chandhunadh =

Indian actor

Chandhunath
- Born: Chandunath G. Nair; Thiruvanthapuram, Kerala, India
- Education: Mar Ivanios College (Bachelors); Christ University (M. Phil)
- Occupation: Actor
- Years active: 2017 – present
- Spouse: Swathy
- Children: 1

Chandunath G, professionally credited as Chandhunadh G Nair, is an Indian actor who appears in Malayalam cinema.

== Early life ==
His father is a retired forest range officer and his mother is working as a Hindi language professor at the University of Kerala. Chandhunadh hails from Thiruvananthapuram. He studied at Mar Ivanios College and later at Christ University, Bangalore for post-graduation. He studied English language and literature. He also holds a Masters in Philosophy. Upon completing his education, he worked as an English teacher at schools and colleges in Bangalore and Thiruvananthapuram, while simultaneously working in theatres teaching acting at acting schools.

== Career ==
He debuted in the film Pathinettam Padi which was directed by Shankar Ramakrishnan. In 2021, he played a supporting role in the film Malik. In 2022, he dubbed for the Malayalam version of the Kannada-language film K.G.F: Chapter 2 for the character Anand Ingalagi played by Ashok Sharma. In the same year, he played one of the 12 principal characters in the crime thriller 12th Man, released on Disney+ Hotstar. In addition, he has acted in the films Paappan, Twenty One Gms and CBI 5: The Brain playing supporting roles.

== Personal life ==
Chandhunadh is married to Swathy, his college girlfriend from Mar Ivanios College. She is a singer and former contestant in the reality TV singing talent show Idea Star Singer. They have one son, Neelamsh. In 2020, they released Swa, a mashup music video of songs of Vidyasagar, produced by Chandhunath and sung by Swathy.

== Filmography ==
Year	Title	Role	Notes	Ref.
2017	Himalayathile Kashmalan	Jose		
2019	Pathinettam Padi	Joy Abraham Palakkal		
2021	Malik	SP Rishab		
2022	Twenty One Gms	Martin		
2022	CBI 5: The Brain	Bhasuran		
2022	12th Man	Jithesh	OTT release	
2022	Paappan	Siddharthan		
2022	Ini Utharam	S.I. Prashanth Varma		
2022	Kakkipada	Doctor		
2023	Divorce	Gagan		
2023	Lovefully Yours Veda	Sijo		
2023	Phoenix	Freddy		
2024	Secret Home	Saran		
2024	Big Ben	Mathews		
2024	Hunt	Shanavas		
2024	Thrayam	Vincent		
2025	Khajuraho Dreams	Meetubhai		
2026	Shukran	Arun		
TBA	Ram †	TBA		
