= Alexander Gaeta =

American physicist (born 1961)

Alexander L. Gaeta
- Education: University of Rochester
- Known for: Nonlinear optics, founding editor of Optica (journal)
- Scientific career
- Thesis: Stochastic and Deterministic Fluctuations in Stimulated Brillouin Scattering (1991)
- Doctoral advisor: Robert W. Boyd

Alexander Luis Gaeta (born 1961) is an American physicist and the David M. Rickey Professor of Applied Physics at Columbia University. He is known for his work on quantum and nonlinear photonics. He is a Fellow of the American Physical Society, Optica (formerly the Optical Society of America), and of the Institute of Electrical and Electronics Engineers.

== Education ==
Gaeta received his B.S. (1983), M.S. (1985), and Ph.D. (1991) degrees in Optics from the University of Rochester in Rochester, New York. His doctoral thesis entitled, "Stochastic and Deterministic Fluctuations in Stimulated Brillouin Scattering", was completed under the supervision of Robert W. Boyd. From 1990 to 1992 he held a postdoctoral fellowship at the Institute of Optics at the university.

== Career and research ==
Gaeta joined the faculty in the School of Applied and Engineering Physics at Cornell University in 1992. He served as its director from 2011 to 2014 and was named the Samuel B. Eckert Professor of Engineering in 2013. He also served as the director of the National Science Foundation Center of Nanoscale Systems in Information Technologies from 2008 to 2012. In 2015, he joined the Department of Applied Physics and Applied Mathematics at Columbia University where he is the David M. Rickey Professor of Applied Physics and Material Science. In 2011, he co-founded Picoluz, Inc. and in 2022 he co-founded Xscape Photonics. He was the founding editor-in-chief of Optica, the flagship journal of Optica (formerly the Optical Society of America).

Gaeta has published more than 260 journal papers in various areas of optical physics and photonics. His group performed fundamental studies on propagation of ultrashort laser pulses and slow light. He also pioneered nonlinear optics in gas-filled hollow-core photonic crystal fiber, and his group also demonstrated various aspects of ultrafast optical time-lens technology including its application to temporal cloaking. In collaboration with Michal Lipson's group, his group performed many of the key demonstrations in nonlinear silicon photonics including dispersion engineering and parametric gain, generation of correlated photons, Kerr comb generation in microresonators, and supercontinuum generation.

== Honors and awards ==
In 2004 Gaeta was elected a Fellow of the Optical Society of America (now Optica). In 2005 he was elected a of Fellow of the American Physical Society "for pioneering experimental and theoretical investigations of nonlinear optical interactions in photonic crystal fibers and with ultrashort pulses in bulk media." He was awarded the 2019 Charles Hard Townes Medal from the then-named Optical Society (OSA) and in the same year became an elected Fellow of Institute of Electrical and Electronics Engineers. Gaeta is a Thomson Reuters Highly Cited Researcher." He is also the 2023 recipient of the Stephen D. Fantone Distinguished Service Award from Optica.
