= Anu Mohan (Malayalam actor) =

Indian actor

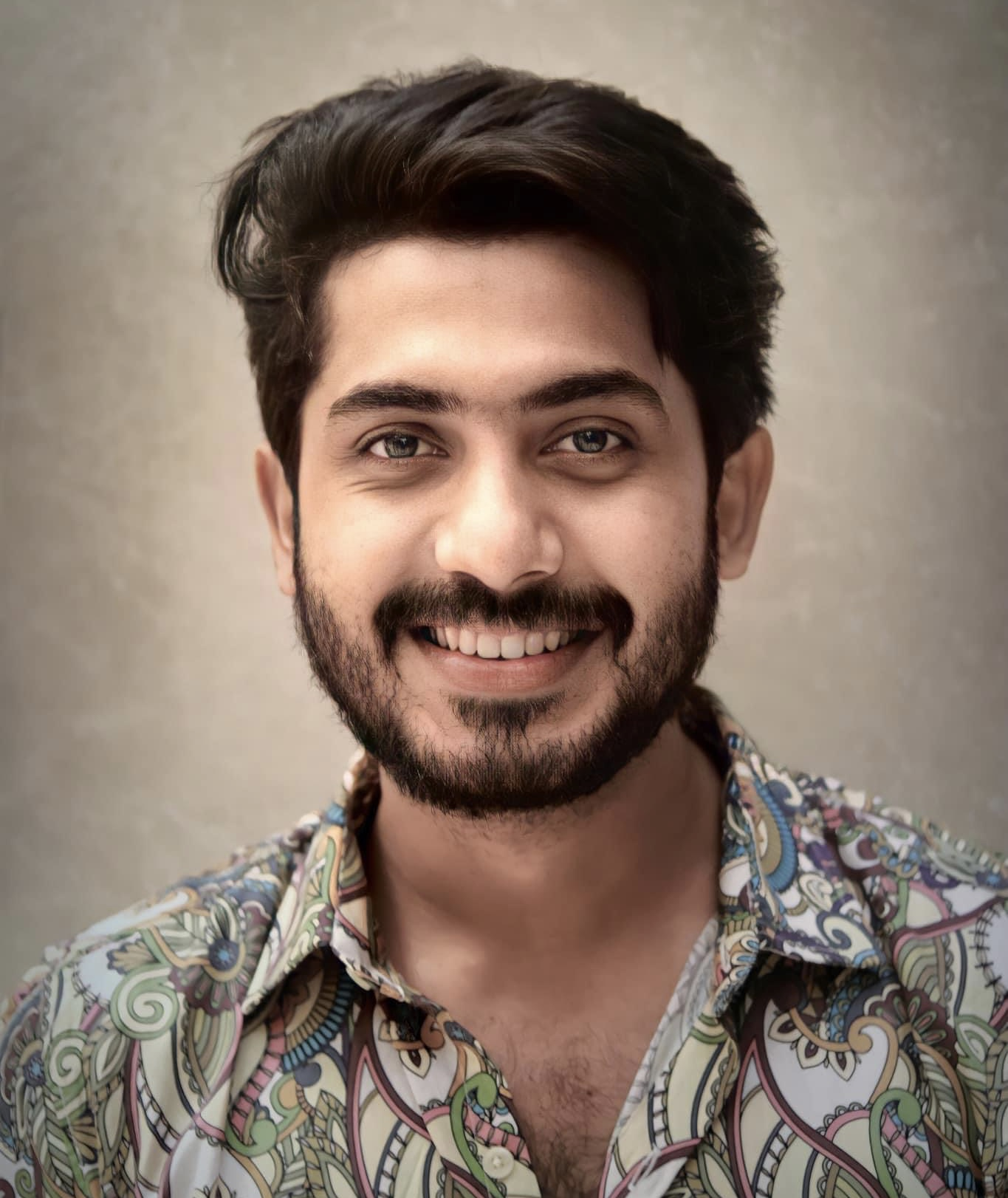
- Born: Anu Mohan; 24 August 1990 (age 36); Kollam, Kerala, India
- Occupation: Actor
- Years active: 2005–present
- Spouse: Maheshwari
- Children: 1
- Parents: K. Mohankumar; Shobha Mohan
- Relatives: Kottarakkara Sreedharan Nair (Grandfather); Saikumar (Uncle); Vinu Mohan (Brother)

Anu Mohan (born 24 August 1990) is an Indian actor who works in Malayalam films.

== Personal life ==
Anu Mohan was born to actress Shobha Mohan and K. Mohankumar in Kottarakkara, Kerala, India. He is the grandson of veteran actor Kottarakkara Sreedharan Nair and nephew of actor Saikumar. His elder brother Vinu Mohan is also an actor.

He married Maheshwari in January 2017. The couple have a son.

== Career ==
He debuted as a child artist in Kanne Madanguka (2005). His first leading role was in 2012 with the film Orkut Oru Ormakoot. In the same year, he played the antagonist in Theevram. He has since acted in the films 7th Day (2014), Crossroad (2017), Ayyappanum Koshiyum (2020) and Last 6 Hours (2022).

== Filmography ==
Key
†	Denotes films that have not yet been released

=== Feature films ===
- All films are in Malayalam language unless otherwise noted.

Year	Title	Role	Notes
2005	Kanne Madanguka	Nassar	Child artist
2009	Chattambinadu	Veeru	
2012	Orkut Oru Ormakoot	Sooraj	
2012	Theevram	Raghavan	
2014	7th Day	Vinu Ramachandran	
2014	Pianist	Manu	
2014	The Last Supper	Imran Khan	
2015	Picket 43	Dineshan	
2015	You Too Brutus	Vicky	
2015	Loka Samastha	Sarath	
2017	Crossroads	Jomon	
2018	Ankarajyathe Jimmanmar	Roshan	
2020	Kattu Kadal Kuthirakal		
2020	Ayyappanum Koshiyum	Sujith	
2022	Twenty One Gms	Sunny	
2022	Lalitham Sundaram	Jerry	Released on Disney+ Hotstar
2022	12th Man	Sidharth	Released on Disney+ Hotstar
2022	Vaashi	Gautham Ganesh	
2022	Last 6 Hours	Shameer	Malayalam-Tamil film
2022	Kotthu	Omar	
2023	Dhoomam	Satya	
2024	Secret Home		
2024	Big Ben		
2024	Hunt	Aravind	
2024	Kadha Innuvare	Joseph	
2025	Vilayath Buddha	Anil Bhaskar	
TBA	Jean Val Jean †	TBA	

=== Short films ===
Year	Film	Role
2015	Open Your Mind	Manu
2017	Oru Aquarium love story	Anu
