= Antony Thekkek =

Indian actor

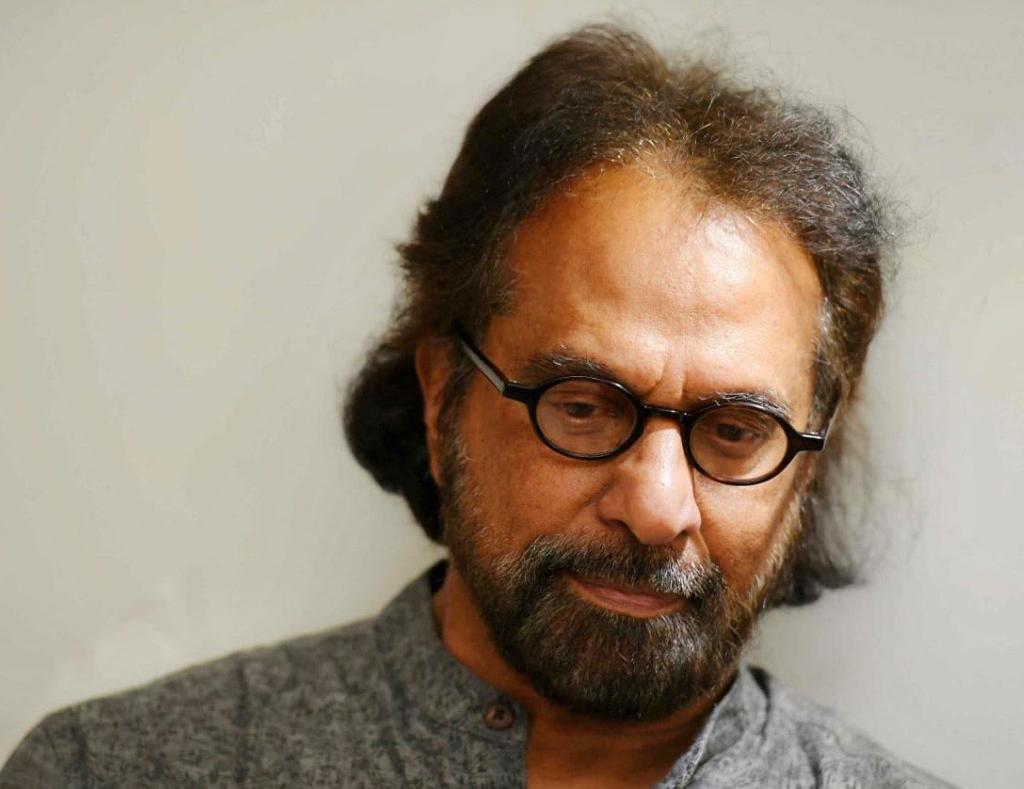
- Born: Ponkunnam, Kerala, India
- Occupations: Actor; producer; author
- Relatives: Babu Antony (brother)

Antony Thekkek, better known as Thampy Antony, is an Indian-American film actor, writer, activist and producer. He is the elder brother of Malayalam actor Babu Antony. As a writer he has published books in Malayalam and English. He is the author of several books such as Koonampara County, Life of Ouso, Lady Biker and Vasco da Gama. As an actor, he is active primarily in Malayalam cinema. He has won Basheer-Amma Malayalam Award for his book Vasco da Gama.

== Early life ==
Thampy Antony was born in Ponkunnam, Kerala, India. He is an engineer by profession. He immigrated to the United States and has lived in the San Francisco Bay Area for more than thirty years.

== Film career ==
Antony made his film debut, with Arabia, a film that starred his younger brother Babu Antony in the lead. He has since then acted in many American and Indian productions, predominantly in Malayalam. He won the Best Actor Award at the Honolulu International Film Festival in 2005 for portraying the role of Dr. Acharya in the English film Beyond the Soul, directed by Rajeev Anchal. In 2010, he featured in the Hollywood film Cash.

Thampi Antony produces films under the banner of Kayal Films.

== Filmography ==
- Arabia (1995)
- Jananayakan (1999)
- Beyond The Soul (2002)
- Nothing But Life (2004)
- Palunku (2006)
- Calcutta News (2008)
- Bhramaram (2009)
- Janaki (2009)
- Sufi Paranja Katha (2010)
- Ca$h (2010)
- Yugapurushan (2010)
- The Wedding (2010)
- In Ghost House Inn (2010)
- Adaminte Makan Abu (2011)
- A Million Dollars (2011)
- Dam 999 (2011)
- Ivan Megharoopan (2012)
- Parudeesa (2012)
- Papilio Buddha (2013)
- ABCD: American-Born Confused Desi (2013)
- Kalimannu (2013)
- Celluloid (2013)
- Monayi Angane Aanayi (2014)
- Apothecary (2014)
- Njangalude Veettile Athidhikal (2015)
- Valiya Chirakulla Pakshikal (2015)
- Monsoon Mangoes (2016)
- Aadupuliyattam (2016)
- Ithu Thaanda Police (2016)
- 10 Kalpanakal (2016)
- Janaki (2018)
- Puzhayamma (2018)
- Naam (2018)
- Ealem (2019)
- Changampuzha Park (2020)
- Headmaster (2022)
- Moradan (2025)
