= Lionel Kimerling =

American materials scientist (born 1943)

- Born: 1943 (age 82–83)
- Scientific career
- Institutions: MIT

Lionel Cooper Kimerling (born 2 December 1943) is an American materials scientist, known for his work in the field of semiconductor materials and their processing. As of 2016, he is the Thomas Lord Professor of Materials Science & Engineering at the Department of Materials Science & Engineering at Massachusetts Institute of Technology (MIT). He headed the Materials Physics Research Department of AT&T Bell Laboratories from 1981 to 1990.

He gained a first degree in Metallurgy in 1965 and a Ph.D in 1968, both from MIT.

Research under his direction has included silicon microphotonics, and the development of the earliest 1MB DRAM as well as long-lasting telecommunications lasers. His group has also developed semiconductor diagnostic methods including deep-level transient spectroscopy, SEM-electron beam-induced current and RF-PCD. Silicon processing is a focus of his research, encompassing integrated circuit fabrication, microphotonic materials and devices, solar energy conversion and environmentally benign integrated circuit manufacturing. The aim of his group's microphotonics research is to integrate optical interconnection with integrated microelectronic circuit chips.

He was elected in 1987 a Fellow of the American Physical Society "for fundamental contributions to the measurement and understanding of the electrical properties of defects in semiconductors and the role of charge state and electronic stimulation in their structure and reactivity"

As Thomas Lord Professor of Materials Science and Engineering at MIT, Kimerling was involved in the launch of the first global roadmap for integrated photonics: Integrated Photonics Systems Roadmap - International (IPSR-I). The MIT Microphotonics Center in the United States and PhotonDelta in Europe founded the roadmap that is an amalgation of their two previously independent roadmaps IPSR and WTWF.

== See also ==
- Anu Agarwal
