= Ini Utharam =

- First Look Poster
- Directed by: Sudheesh Ramachandran
- Written by: Ranjith Unni
- Produced by: Arun Raj; Varun Raj
- Starring: Aparna Balamurali; Harish Uthaman; Kalabhavan Shajohn
- Cinematography: Ravi Chandran
- Edited by: Jithin D
- Music by: Hesham Abdul Wahab
- Production companies: A & V Entertainments
- Release date: 7 October 2022
- Running time: 126 minutes
- Country: India
- Language: Malayalam

Ini Utharam (transl. Now the answer) is a 2022 Indian Malayalam-language crime thriller film directed by Sudheesh Ramachandran and written by Ranjith Unni. The film stars Aparna Balamurali, Kalabhavan Shajohn, Harish Uthaman, Siddique.

"Ini Utharam" was released in theaters on October 7, 2022, and received a mixed response from audiences.

== Plot ==
Home Minister Varkala Dinesan is about to go on a foreign tour. Then he sees in the news that in the Santhanpara crayon factory strike, the police led by CI Karunan attacked a peaceful protesting mob. At that time, SP Ilavarasan comes there and the minister inquires about the Santhanpara issue, but he says that it is not a big problem, the police attacked only for self-defense and it is all people's misunderstandings. SP is very loyal to the minister; he sees the minister getting irritated by mosquito bites, so the SP calls the pest controller, slaps the pest controller guy, and warns him not to repeat it again. Then he happily sends the minister on his way.

While traveling on a bus, Janaki rewinds the past. Janaki is a doctor who is in love with Ashwin, a wildlife photographer. Meanwhile, she gives him a smartphone as a gift because he lives in the wild and doesn't know the ways of urban humans. Both their families are happy with the relationship. Then, someone steals Ashwin's bike. But the police find the bike, and Ashwin's friend Vivek asks him on the phone why he didn't even thank the CI. He tells Janaki that there is nothing to thank; it is his duty and for the bribe. Suddenly, she gets shocked and wakes up from her old memory. Then she gets off the bus and reaches the nearest police station. Janaki tells them that she wants to meet the CI and doesn't tell them why. When they urge her further, she tells them that she killed and buried her friend, Vivek.

First the police did not believe her. But later the news spread to media. When the media came to police station, she revealed before the media about the murder. Parallelly, Vivek's missing was confirmed. So the police take Janaki to the scene of the murder. After reaching there, Janaki twists her words, revealing that the CI is also involved in the murder. This angers the CI and he slaps Janaki, which further escalates the situation. The entire crowd turns against the police at the murder spot. One of the officers calls the SP to come to the scene to help calm the situation.

After the SP reached the spot, they started digging. There, they found a body, but it was not Vivek's—it was someone else's. Then, they discovered a second body, which was Ashwin, Janaki's lover. In addition, CI Karunan's smartwatch was found in the hole, which further pointed all leads to CI Karunan.

The SP began interrogating Janaki and CI Karunan. Janaki refused to reveal anything and told him to ask the CI. Then, CI Karunan started to explain what had actually happened and who the dead men were. Fifteen years ago, when Dineshan, a party candidate, feared losing the election, he falsely accused Ganeshan of sexual harassment. Still, the party ticket was given to Ganeshan. So, Dineshan planned his murder with Karunan. They took a driver, Prakashan's, help. During the accident that led to Ganeshan's death, a jeep driver witnessed it. The jeep driver went to CI Karunan to report the accident, but Karunan falsely accused the jeep driver and put him behind bars. He was a party worker who had led protests against the now deceased Ganeshan.

A few days later, driver Prakashan's child passed away during pregnancy. He felt guilty and turned to God for repentance. He became a pastor. A few years later, Prakasan accidentally happened to visit the home of the jeep driver. He is mentally unwell and his family is in a very difficult situation. A guilt-ridden Prakashan went to CI Karunan and said he would confess about the accident. Karunan then lured Prakashan to the forest and killed him. Aswin, who was nearby, saw everything, so Karunan killed him too.Aswin had also recorded video of the whole incident where Prakasan and Karunan talks about Ganeshan's murder and then Karunan killing Prakasan.

After CI Karunan confessed his crimes, SP assured him that police will take care. That night, Karunan tried to reach the minister, but no one helped. He then committed suicide. Janaki was set free based on Karunan's confession. Janaki then explained how she found Aswin's body and how she reached the station.

In the film credits, the SI asks how Aswin left his glasses and begins to suspect Janaki. It is revealed that while interrogating Janaki, the SP appreciated her bravery, so he decided to support her. He talked to the minister to "close the Karunan chapter." That night, three people entered the police station and killed Karunan in the presence of the SP and Janaki. At the end, Janaki is seen sitting with the minister, watching the recorded murder video.

== Cast ==
- Aparna Balamurali as Dr. Janaki Ganesh
- Harish Uthaman as SP Ilavarasan
- Kalabhavan Shajohn as CI Karunan a.k.a. Kakka Karunan
- Siddique as Home Minister Varkala Dineshan
- Chandunath G Nair as SI Prashanth Varma
- Jaffar Idukki as Pastor Prakashan
- Siddharth Menon as Ashwin

== Soundtrack ==
The music for the film was composed by Hesham Abdul Wahab with lyrics written by Vinayak Sasikumar.

Title	Singer	Lyricist	Ref.
Melleyenne	KS Harishankar	Vinayak Sasikumar	

== Controversies ==
The movie was criticized for featuring a dialogue "Nobody will wish to commit a mistake. But after committing a mistake, they'll surely wish to be rescued." and claimed that it is stated in Thirukkural. This dialogue faced many criticisms from Tamil YouTubers since there is no such Kural stating the same and that it was purposefully added to the script to defame the classic work by Tamils.
