= Twenty One Gms =

2022 Indian film

- Theatrical release poster
- Directed by: Bibin Krishna
- Written by: Bibin Krishna
- Produced by: Rinish K. N.
- Starring: Anoop Menon; Renji Panicker; Leona Lishoy; Anu Mohan; Ranjith; Aji John; Manasa Radhakrishnan; Vivek Anirudh
- Cinematography: Jithu Damodar
- Edited by: Appu N. Bhattathiri
- Music by: Deepak Dev
- Production company: The Front Row Productions
- Distributed by: The Front Row Productions
- Release date: 18 March 2022
- Country: India
- Language: Malayalam

Twenty One Gms is a 2022 Indian Malayalam-language crime thriller film written and directed by Bibin Krishna in his directorial debut. The film stars Anoop Menon who investigates a series of murders that takes place within a week. It also features Renji Panicker, Leona Lishoy, Anu Mohan, Aji John, Chandunath G Nair, and Ranjith in supporting roles. The soundtrack was composed by Deepak Dev, with lyrics written by Vinayak Sasikumar.

Twenty One Gms was released in theatres on 18 March 2022. It received positive reviews from critics.

== Plot ==
Nanda Kishore is the Deputy Superintendent at the Police Crime Branch, who lives a sad life with his wife Gauri after their only daughter passes away. Gauri's brother Vinay soon joins them and agrees to live with them considering his sister's grief and loneliness.

Nandan is investigating the death of a lady called Anjali who was biomedical engineer at a multispecialty hospital in the city. On the next day of Anjali's death which is considered as a homicide, her brother Martin is also found dead in the same apartment where she was murdered. Nandakishore along with his assistant Sunny, collects evidences from the crime scene.

He suspects Martin's former friend and business partner Jimmy Cherian who is a notorious entrepreneur. Nandan arrests Murugan, a local goon who is trusted by Jimmy but Murugan tells he is innocent and he says another goon named Tony (Tipper Tony) has gone missing after the murders. The DNA samples collected from the crime scene matches Tony and he is identified as one of the killers of Anjali and the killer of Martin.

Nandan finds out that a call was made from Tony's fake sim card to another number which was in the tower location of a famous hotel where a party took place on the same day of Anjali's death, for all famous entrepreneurs of the city including Jimmy, hosted by John Samuel, the owner of the multi-speciality hospital Anjali was working. Nandan asks Nikhil, a staff and trusted assistant of John Samuel for video footages of the party but he is unable to find any footages after 11 pm. Nikhil tells that the videographer left by 11 which was later found to be a lie. Nandan concludes that the other killer who was with Tony is a left hander from the manner of throat slash and dismisses Jimmy as the suspect. He calls Nikhil to his office to get a list of other guests who attended the party and finds out Nikhil is a left hander. As soon as Nikhil leaves the office, the fingerprints are collected and he is identified as the killer. A car follows Nikhil on his way back and he is found dead the next day in his car. Nandan finds a video from Anjali's phone which was sent to her brother Martin in which she reveals her life is under threat as she has evidences of unauthorised drug trials on children happening in the hospital, planned by John Samuel which she and journalist Shihab tried to bring to light. Shibab died following a cardiac arrest before he could publish them and now the killers are behind he. She leaves a message for Martin to publish the evidences she has collected. She was killed on that day by Nikhil and Tony but they are unable to find the documents. Her brother Martin was killed the next day while he was searching for the files following the clues from her video message. Nandan is shocked as his daughter died in the same hospital presumably following the drug trials and he tries to complete what Anjali and Shihab started. He plans to arrest John Samuel as he is behind the murders and the drug trials but the evidences goes missing from the office of the Superintendent of Police.

Nandan tracks an old Contessa car as he learns a man who came in the car customised wreaths of a specific manner several times and placed them on Anjali's grave including the day of Nikhil's death and confirms the killer is someone very close to Anjali as the wreaths were made of her favourite flowers. The police find out the car which followed Nikhil from camera footages and finds it is new and it is revealed to be Vinay's. Later it is revealed that Anjali was Vinay's girlfriend and he was taking antidepressants, the prescriptions for which was found near Nikhil's dead body. Vinay reveals although he wanted to kill Nikhil, it was not him.

John arrives at the airport from abroad and travels to his home by car. The police offers security to him as the murderer of Nikhil might be targeting John, too. Vinay is arrested and the police withdraws John Samuel's police security thinking the killer is now in police custody. Nandan receives a call from John Samuel where he mocks Nandan that he can never arrest John as he will never have the evidences. John is killed soon, after the man who came in an old Contessa car slashes his throat and the killer is revealed to be Martin.

Later it is shown that Martin was not dead and although Tony attacked Martin while searching for the files in Anjali's apartment, Tony was killed by Martin and his body was burnt, and only a metal rod in his leg was remaining. The body was identified to be Martin's by a priest who is Anjali's and Martin's uncle who Jimmy had misled into believing that Martin has a metal rod in his leg from an accident in USA. Nandan learns Tony also had a metal rod following an accident and the body was Tony's which is why he was missing ever since the murders. Martin took the old Contessa in which Tony came and murdered Nikhil and John afterwards. Nandan hides his findings as he thinks what Martin did is right.

In the tail end Nandan receives a call from Sunny to inform that the old Contessa car was found Tamil Nadu and the driver's face is not clear and the police plans to reopen the case to catch its driver, who is assumed to be 'Tony'.

== Cast ==
- Anoop Menon as DySP Nanda Kishore IPS
- Leona Lishoy as Gouri, Kishore's wife
- Anu Mohan as CI Sunny Tharakan, Crime Branch
- Vivek Anirudh as Vinay
- Mareena Michael Kurisingal as ASI Abhirami, Crime Branch
- Aji John as Jimmy Cherian
- Nandu as Fr. Joseph
- Manasa Radhakrishnan as Anjali
- Chandhunadh as Martin
- Ranjith as Dr. John Samuel
- Lena as SP Rachel Vincent IPS, Crime Branch
- Renji Panicker as Dr. Alex Koshy
- Shankar Ramakrishnan as Shihab Muhammed
- Prasanth Alexander as CI Sreenivasan
- Jeeva Joseph as Nikhil Narayanan
- Bineesh Bastin as Tipper Tony
- Rajkumar Radhakrishnan as Murugan

== Production ==
The film is the directorial debut of Bibin Krishna, an IT engineer. The film was also produced by his IT colleague Rinish K. N. who was keen to produce films. In June 2021, Krishna told to The Hindu that he had the screenplay completed four years ago but he used this time to improve his knowledge in filmmaking by working in short films. Anoop Menon heard the story in December 2020, who suggested to start filming in January 2021, they managed to start filming with the next 15 days. It was shot in Kochi and Vagamon. Filming was completed in March 2021 just before the COVID-19 pandemic in India.

== Music ==
The soundtrack was composed by Deepak Dev, with lyrics written by Vinayak Sasikumar.

== Release ==
The film was released in theatres on 18 March 2022. It was digitally released for streaming on Disney+ Hotstar on 10 June 2022. The satellite rights of the film were acquired by Asianet.

== Reception ==
The film generally received positive reviews from critics and audience. The Times of India rated the film 3 out of 5 stars and wrote "A thriller that saves its twists till the end"

== See also ==
- 21 Grams, a 2003 American film.
