= Nithya Mammen =

Indian playback singer

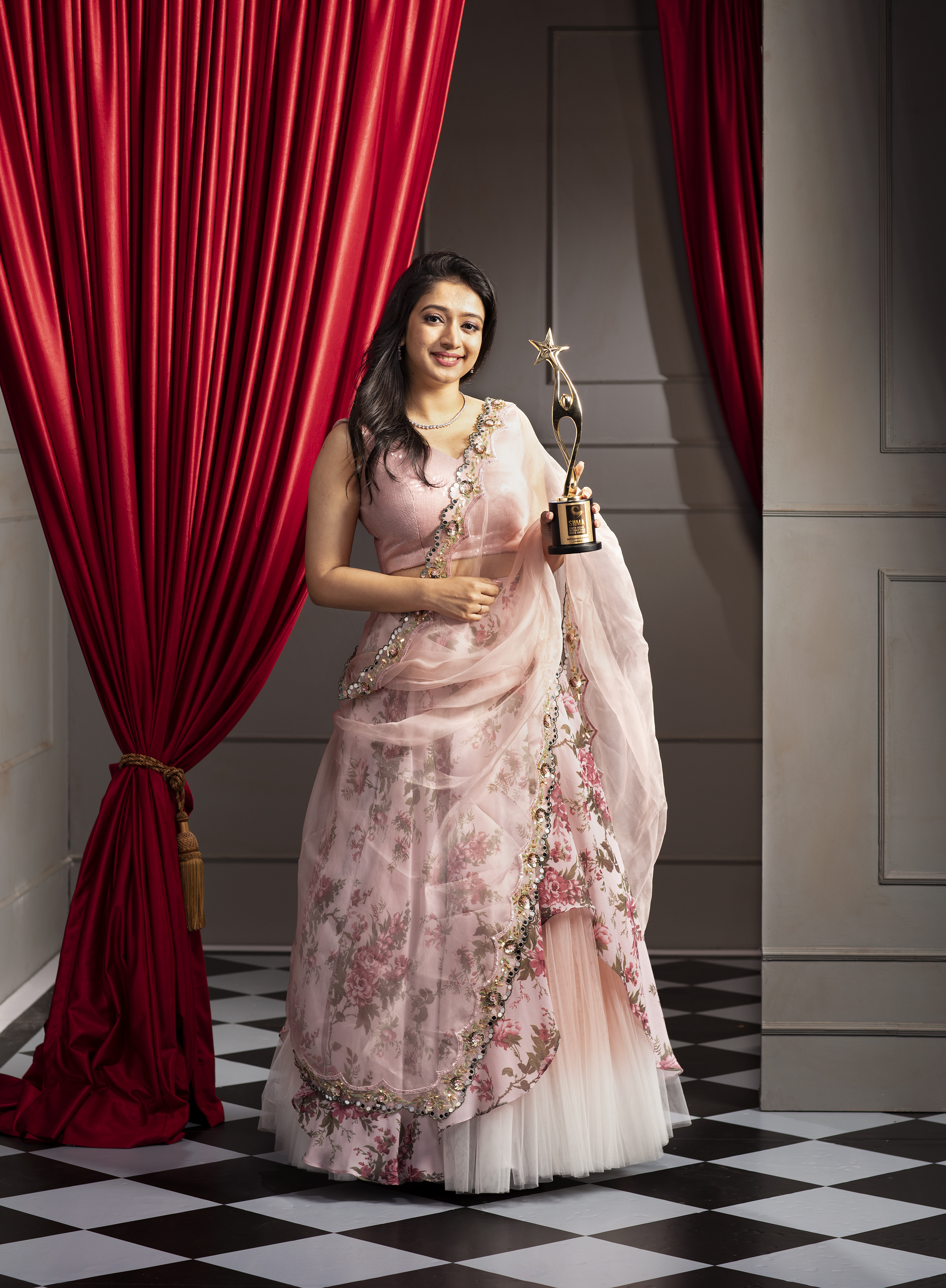
- Nithya Mammen with Her SIIMA Award 2021 at Hyderabad, India

Background information
- Born: 24 July 1994 (age 32); Doha, Qatar
- Genre: Filmi
- Occupation: Playback singer
- Years active: 2019–present

Nithya Mammen is an Indian playback singer. She rose to fame with her debut song "Nee Himamazhayayi " from the Malayalam movie Edakkad Battalion 06. She received the Kerala State Film Award for Best Female Playback Singer for the song "Vathikkalu Vellaripravu " from the movie Sufiyum Sujathayum.

== Early life ==
Nithya was born in Doha, Qatar, to Mammen Varghese and Annamma. She was raised in Doha and was later moved to Bengaluru for her studies, where she invested in learning Hindustani classical music while doing her bachelor's degree in architecture at B.M.S. College of Engineering. She is married to Vivek Francis, who was her senior in college.

== Career ==
She debuted with the song "Nee Himazhayayi" from the Malayalam movie Edakkad Battalion 06 starring Tovino Thomas. She received the Kerala State Film Award for Best Female Playback Singer at the 51st Kerala State Film Awards for the song "Vathikkalu Vellaripravu" from the movie Sufiyum Sujathayum.

Nithya released her first single "Kaathale" in January 2022. She is currently a judge on the singing reality competition show Top Singer.

== Discography ==
=== Singles ===
Year	Song	Language	Composer(s)	Lyrics	Ref
2022	Kaathale	Malayalam	Ebin Pallichan	Nithin K Cheriyan	
2024	Maranden Unnai	Tamil	DJ Agnivesh	Arun Sukumaran	

Television title song

Year	Song	Composer(s)	Show	Channel	Ref
2023	Aalapalaya	Arun Vijay	Manimuthu	Mazhavil Manorama	
2024	Nayike	Ratheesh Vegha	Kadhanayika	Mazhavil Manorama	
2024	Malakhakunjole	Ratheesh Vegha	Kadhanayika	Mazhavil Manorama	

=== Film songs ===
Malayalam
Year	Song	Film	Composer(s)	Lyrics	Co-singer(s)
2019	Nee Himamazhayayi	Edakkad Battalion 06	Kailas Menon	B.K. Harinaryanan	K. S. Harisankar
2020	Vathikkalu Vellaripravu	Sufiyum Sujatayum	M. Jayachandran	B.K. Harinaryanan	Arjun Krishna, Zia Ul Haq
2020	Ee Vazhiye	The Kung Fu Master	Ishaan Chhabra	Sreerekha Bhaskaran	Karthik
2021	Ethetho Maunangal	Cheraathukal	Mejo Joseph	Anu Kurisinkal	Vidhu Prathap
2021	Nenchile Chillayil	Michael's Coffee House	Ronnie Raphael	B.K. Harinaryanan	K. S. Harisankar
2021	Ninnodu Cheran	Star	William Francis	B.K. Harinaryanan	
2021	Aaromal Thaaramay	Minnal Murali	Shaan Rahman	Manu Manjith	Sooraj Santhosh
2021	Gaaname	Madhuram	Hesham Abdul Wahab	Vinayak Sasikumar	Sooraj Santhosh
2022	Alare	Member Rameshan 9aam Ward	Kailas Menon	Shabareesh Varma	Ayraan
2022	Kannil Minnum	Meppadiyan	Rahul Subrahmanian	Joe Paul	Karthik
2022	Anthivaanin	Ikkakka	Pradeep Babu	Santhosh Varma	
2022	Paathi Paathi	Night Drive	Ranjin Raj	Murukan Kattakada	Kapil Kapilan
2022	Ilamazha Chattin	Kochaal	P S Jayhari	Santhosh Varma	Pradeep Kumar
2022	Moovanthikkavile	Alli	Sathish Viswa	Shyam Nellikkunnu	
2022	Pen Poove Thenvande	Sita Ramam (Malayalam)	Vishal Chandrashekhar	Arun Alat	Sharreth
2022	Jeevane	Mike	Hesham Abdul Wahab	Rafeeq Ahamed	Vijay Yesudas
2022	Aayiraththiri	Headmaster	Kavalam Sreekumar	Prabha Varma	
2022	Neelakasham Pole	Vivaha Avahanam	Vinu Thomas	B.K. Harinaryanan	Najim Arshad
2022	Ee Manjin Kuliralayil	Louis	Rajeev Siva	Shabu Usman	
2022	Vaadaruthe	Autorickshawkarante Bharya	Ouseppachan	Prabha Varma	
2022	Imakal Chimmathiravum	Adrishyam	Rajin Raj	B.K. Harinaryanan	K. S. Harisankar
2022	Theuvoram	Last 6 Hours (Malayalam)	Kailash Menon		Niranj Suresh
2023	Arikeyonnu Kandoru	Vellari Pattanam	Sachin Shankor Mannath	Vinayak Sasikumar	K. S. Harisankar
2023	Shwasame	Santhosham	P S Jayhari	Vinayak Sasikumar	K. S. Harisankar
2023	Hakkana Kon Amaral	Ennalum Ente Aliya	William Francis	Moyinkutty Vaidyar, Billy Black	William Francis
2023	Athmavil	Enthada Saji	William Francis	Arshad Rahim	William Francis
2023	Ariya Shalabhame	Kaipola	Mejo Joseph	Vinayak Sasikumar	Hari Shankar
2023	King of Kotha Title track ( rap )	King Of Kotha	Shaan Rahman	Fejo	Fejo
2023	Panjimuttai	Thrishanku	Jay Unnithan	Manu Manjith	Nitin Raj
2023	Imakalil Neeye...	Rahel Makan Kora	Kailas Menon	Harinarayanan	Abhijith
2023	Mazhamukil	Thirayattam	Ebin Pallichan	Nithin K Cheriyan	
2024	Nee Ente Manassil	Princess Street	Prince George	Manu Manjith	Kapil
2024	Raanjhitha...	Princess street	Prince George	Vinayak Sashikumaran	Harishankar
2024	Kanthurannu....	Kanaka Rajyam	Arun Muraleedharan	Dhanya Suresh Menon	Abhijith Anilkumar
2024	Then kuruvikale...	Abhirami	Sibu Sukumaran	Joe Paul	Sachin Warrier
2024	Neela Nila	Checkmate	Ratish Sekhar	Harinarayanan BK	Ratish Sekhar
2024	Azhake... Ni	Checkmate	Ratish Shekhar	Dhanya Suresh Menon	Ratish Shekhar
2024	Kaalame.	Kadha Innu Vare	Ashwin Aryan	Rajeev Govindan	Ashwin Aryan
2024	Minnum Tharangal..	Kadha Innu Vare	Ashwin Aryan	Ajeesh Dasan	Kapil Kapilan
2024	Ethetho Mounangal..	Cup	Shaan Rahman	Manu Manjith	Mithun Jayaraj
2024	Pularkale Poovilikettu	Pavi Caretaker	Midhun Mukundan	Shibu Chakravarthy	Vijay Yesudas
2025	Vellamanjinte	Besty	Ouseppachan	Shibu chakravarthy	Sachin Balu
2026	Kutti Kutti Poove	Aakasamlo Oka Tara (Malayalam)	G. V. Prakash Kumar		

Tamil
Year	Song	Film	Composer(s)	Lyrics	Co-singer(s)
2022	Nedunaalai Nenjil	Last 6 Hours (Tamil)	Kailash Menon	Sakthivel Kalyani	Niranj Suresh
2023	King of Kotha (Title Track)	King of Kotha (Tamil)	Shaan Rahman	Jakes Bejoy, Travis King, Mani Amuthavan, Asal Kolaar, Roll Rida, Mu.Ri	Shaan Rahman, Yogi Sekar
2024	Thulli thulli vilayada	Behindd (Tamil)	Sunny Madhavan	Mani Maninathan	
2025	Aayiram Poo	Por Paravai (Tamil)	Midhun Narayanan	Yugabharathi	Haricharan

== Television shows ==
Program	Role	Channel	Notes
Top Singer Season 4	Judge	Flowers TV	

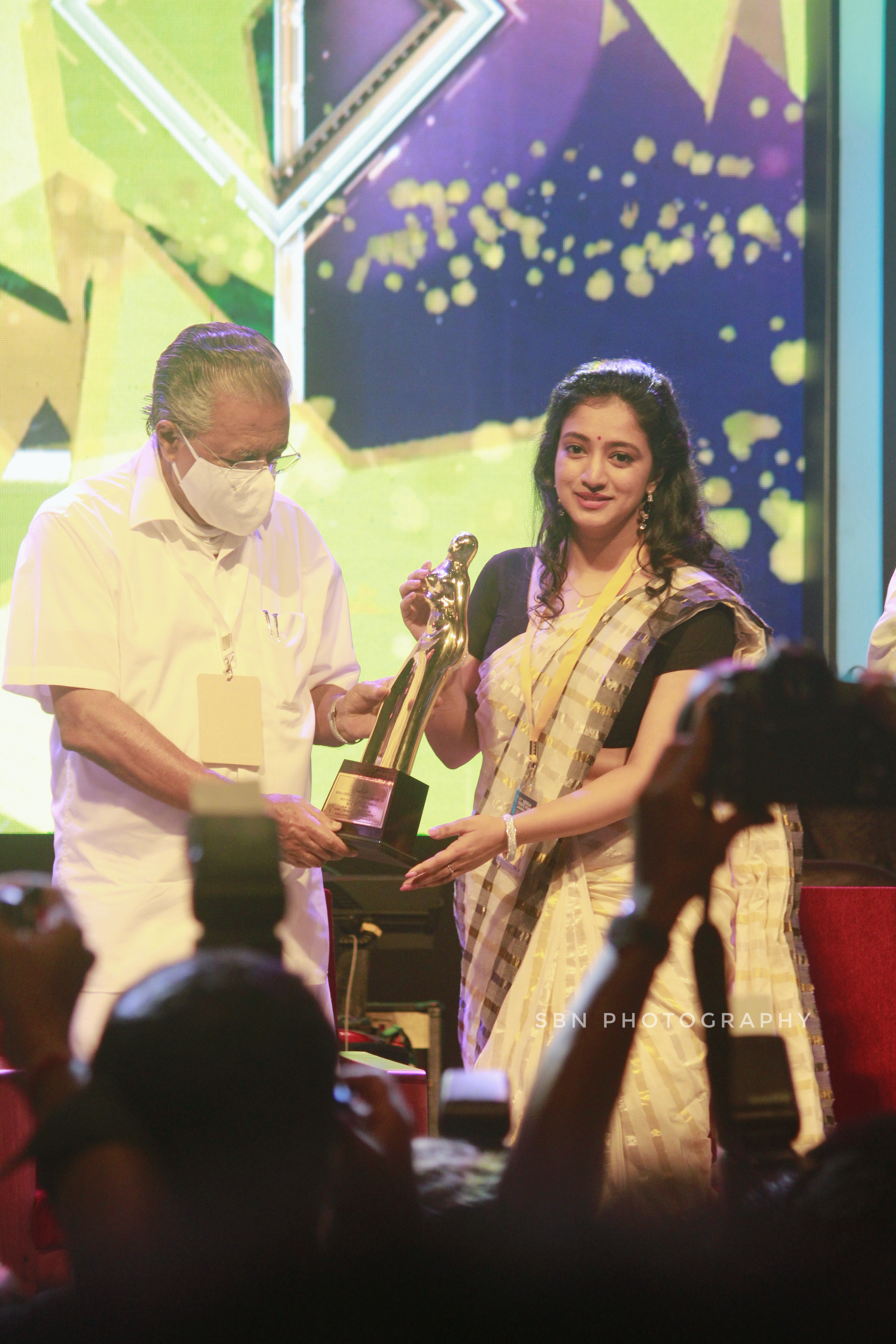
Kerala State Film Award for Best Singer 2020

== Awards and nominations ==
Year	Award	Category	Song	Film	Ref.
2019	Ramu Kariot Award	Best Female Playback Singer	Nee Himamazhayayi	Edakkadu Battalion 06	
2020	51st Kerala State Film Awards	Best Female Playback Singer	Vathikkalu Vellaripravu	Sufiyum Sujatayum	
2020	Mazhavil Music Awards	Best Duet Singer (Shared with KS Harishankar)	Nee Himamazhayayi	Edakkadu Battalion 06	
2021	SIIMA	Best Female Playback Singer	Vathikkal vellaripraavu	Sufiyum Sujatayum	
2021	Santhosh Suman TV Awards	Best Female Playback Singer	Vathikkal Vellaripraavu	Sufiyum Sujatayum	
2023	Poovachal Khader award	Best Female Playback Singer	Vaadaruthe	Autorickshawkarante Bharya	
2023	Kerala State Critics award	Best Female Playback Singer	Aayirathiri	Headmaster	
2023	Mowli Filim Awards	Best Female Playback Singer	Vaadaruthe	Autorickshawkarante Bharya	
2023	JC Daniel Award	Best Female Playback Singer	Arikeyonnu Kandoru	Vellaripattanam	
