= Prem Kumar (academic) =

American physicist, engineer

- Born: India
- Education: Delhi University; Indian Institutes of Technology; University at Buffalo
- Scientific career
- Institutions: Northwestern University; Massachusetts Institute of Technology

Prem Kumar is an Indian-American physicist and engineer who is a professor and Director of the Center for Photonic Communication and Computing at Northwestern University. His research focuses on quantum computing, quantum communications, and photonics. His research creates robust photonic communication between quantum devices, with a particular emphasis on developing next-generation fibre-based quantum networks. He is a Fellow of SPIE, Optica, the Institute of Physics, and the Institute of Electrical and Electronics Engineers.

== Early life and education ==
Kumar studied physics at Delhi University. He moved to the Indian Institutes of Technology for his master's degree, before joining the University at Buffalo for his doctoral research. After earning his doctorate Kumar was appointed as a Research Scientist at the Massachusetts Institute of Technology.

== Research and career ==
In 1986, Kumar joined Northwestern University. He was made a professor in 1991, and Director of the Centre for Photonic Communication in 2000. He founded NuCrypt in 2003, a company which generates, distributes and measures entangled photons.

In 2010, Kumar was made Editor in Chief of Optica. In 2013, he left Northwestern to serve as a program manager for DARPA, where he was named Program Manager of the Year in 2015 and awarded the Secretary of Defense Medal for Outstanding Public Service in 2016. At DARPA, Kumar led the Fundamental Limits of Photon Detection ('Detect') program. Detect looked to understand whether a single photon detector could simultaneously optimize key performance metrics—including efficiency, timing resolution, bandwidth, photon-number resolution, operating temperature, and noise characteristics—or whether fundamental quantum-mechanical tradeoffs impose limits on detector performance. The program had implications for applications such as LIDAR, astronomy, communications, medical imaging, microscopy, quantum information processing, and remote sensing.

In 2026, Kumar was announced as interim chair of the Northwestern University Department of Electrical and Computer Engineering.

Kumar has contributed to the development of quantum teleportation and quantum networking over existing telecommunications infrastructure. He demonstrated the distribution of quantum entanglement over a 24.4 km fibre link between Evanston and downtown Chicago while the same fibre simultaneously carried commercial internet traffic. The experiment achieved entanglement fidelity exceeding 94%, representing the first reported demonstration of entanglement distribution between remote nodes over a fibre carrying modern telecommunications data. The team employed wavelength separation techniques, placing quantum signals in the optical O-band while classical communications remained in the C-band, and used the White Rabbit timing system to synchronize the network at picosecond precision. His research group has subsequently pursued metropolitan-scale quantum teleportation and the development of practical quantum internet architectures.

== Awards and honors ==
- Elected Fellow of the Institute of Physics
- Elected Fellow of Optica
- Elected (Life) Fellow of the Institute of Electrical and Electronics Engineers
- Elected Fellow of SPIE
- 2004 International Quantum Communications Award
- 2006 Walder Research Excellence Award
- 2013 Hermann Anton Haus Lecture
- 2015 DARPA Program Manager of the Year
- 2016 Secretary of Defense Medal for Outstanding Public Service, US Department of Defense
- 2025 Researcher to Know, IL Science and Technology Coalition

== Selected publications ==
- Xiaoying Li; Paul L. Voss; Jay E Sharping; Prem Kumar (9 February 2005). "Optical-fiber source of polarization-entangled photons in the 1550 nm telecom band". Physical Review Letters. 94 (5) 053601. arXiv:quant-ph/0402191. doi:10.1103/PHYSREVLETT.94.053601. ISSN 0031-9007. PMID 15783637. Wikidata Q59481877.
- David Awschalom; Karl K. Berggren; Hannes Bernien; et al. (24 February 2021). "Development of Quantum Interconnects (QuICs) for Next-Generation Information Technologies". PRX Quantum. 2 (1). arXiv:1912.06642. doi:10.1103/PRXQUANTUM.2.017002. ISSN 2691-3399. Wikidata Q108282276.
- P Kumar (1 December 1990). "Quantum frequency conversion". Optics Letters. 15 (24): 1476–1478. Bibcode:1990OptL...15.1476K. doi:10.1364/OL.15.001476. ISSN 0146-9592. PMID 19771127. Wikidata Q84577734.
