= Kavalam Sreekumar =

Indian classical singer

Kavalam Srikumar
- Born: 3 March 1959 (age 67)
- Origin: India
- Genres: Carnatic music
- Occupations: Carnatic vocalist, Musician and Composer
- Instrument: Vocal

Kavalam Srikumar is a classical musician, Malayalam film singer and music composer from Kerala, India. His recitation of Ramayana is also famous. He has also rendered more than 200 famous Malayalam poems. He is the son of the noted Malayalam poet and dramatist Kavalam Narayana Panicker.

== Biography ==
Kavalam Srikumar was born on 3 March 1959, in Alappuzha, Alappuzha district to Padmabhushan Kavalam Narayana Panikkar and Saradamani. He had an elder brother named Harikrishnan, who died in 2009. Srikumar started learning classical music vocals at the age of five, and studied music under masters like Ambalappuzha Sivasankara Panicker, Thrissur Vaidyanathan, Mavelikkara Prabhakara Varma and Ambalappuzha Tulasi. Had advanced training in Karnatic Music under the famous Musician Shri.B.Sasikumar. He joined as programme executive in All India Radio in 1985 and voluntarily retired from service in 2007, as Assistant Station Director. His wife is Lekshmy Sreekumar and has two children, Krishna Narayanan & Gouri Sreekumar.

Sreekumar, who had participated in music competitions and won prizes since childhood, has won second place for classical music in the Kerala State School Arts Festival held in Alappuzha in 1971 and third place in 1972.

== Musical career ==
Kavalam Srikumar, as a musician, has made his mark in Karnatic classical, devotional, folk and indigenous music of Kerala. He has also sung many movie songs in Malayalam. Malayalam movie Headmaster is Kavalam Srikumar's first music directorial film.

Has performed over 1000 music concerts all over India & abroad in prestigious festivals. Also performed in Sanchi Sreevidya festival in Dec 2018 where he rendered Sree Sankaracharya's compositions. His clear rendering of scriptures like Ramayana, Bhagavatha, Lalitha &amp; Vishnu Sahasra Namam, Soundarya Lahari, Bhagavad Geetha, Dhyana Slokas etc. Are widely listened and acclaimed by many throughout the world. He was given the title "Ramakadha Shukan” from Malliyur Sankaran Nambudirippadu in the year 1998 for his contributions in the field of Ramayana rendering. Received “Ganapoornasree” award from Chettikulangara in 2011. Received Kerala Sangeeth Natak Akademi Award in 2012 for Classical Music. Received Ramapurath Warrier Award in 2017, Sangeetha Ratna Puraskar from M S Subbalakshmy foundation in 2017, Kerala Film Critics Award for best music director in 2023.

He has been rendering Adhyatma Ramayana right from 1985, when he stood before the microphone at All India Radio. Since then he has been instrumental in popularizing Thunchath Ezhuthachans Adhyatma Ramayanam Kilippattu(the Malayalam version of Ramayana) with his emphasis on emotion without compromising on its lyrical quality. His rendering of Hindu scriptures like Bhagavatham, Lalitha Sahasra Namam, Vishnu Sahasra Namam and Soundarya Lahari, to name a few, are much sought after.

== Awards ==
- 2012 - Kerala Sangeetha Nataka Akademi Award
- 1989 - Gurusashat Parabrahma - All India Radio- Annual Award for the best musical feature
- 1990- Parayipetta Panthirukulam - All India Radio- Annual Award for the best musical feature
- Won first prize for consecutive 5 years in Classical Vocal in the University Youth Festival.
- 1998 - He was given the title “ Ramakadha Shukan” by Malliyur Sankaran Nambudiri for his contributions in rendering Adhyathma Ramayanam.
- 2011 - Ganapoornasree award from Chettikulangara Temple.
- 2017 - Ramapurath Warrier Award.
- 2017 - Sangeetha Ratna Puraskar from M S Subbalakshmy foundation.
- 2023 Bamsuri Ramayanasree Award for his outstanding contribution in propagating the epic Ramayana.
