= Ravisankar =

Indian playback singer

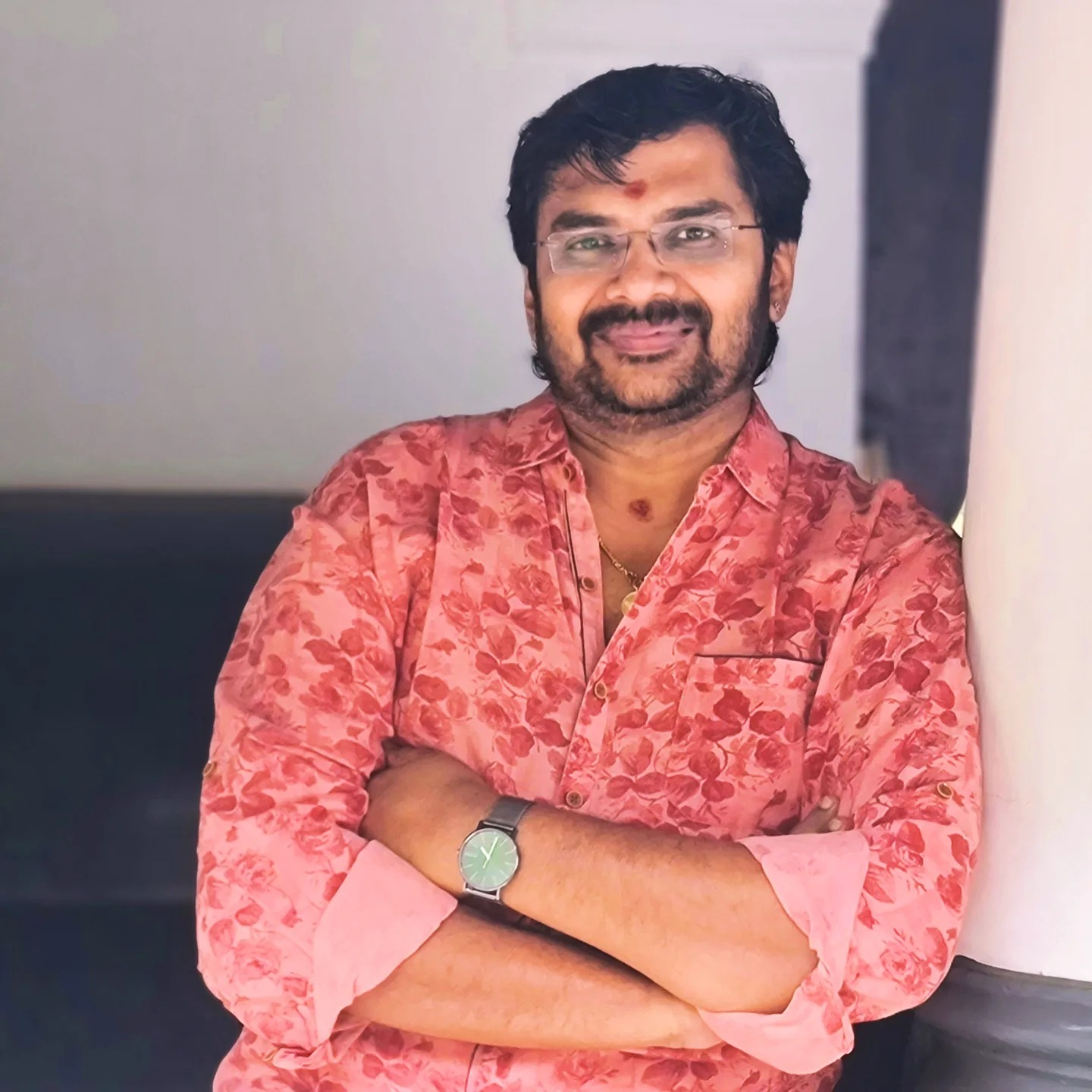

Background information
- Origin: India
- Occupations: Playback singer, Musician
- Years active: 1999–present

Ravisankar is an Indian playback singer. He has recorded many number of songs both filmy, non filmy, devotional, drama and other categories.

== Early life ==
Ravisankar was born and raised in Thiruvananthapuram, Kerala, India, to S. Ramachandran Nair and S. Hamsini Thankam. He started learning music as a child from his mother, a teacher at Bharatiya Vidyabhavan, Trivandrum. He went on to study music formally under L. Vaikuntapaty, Perumbavoor G. Ravindranath and M. G. Radhakrishnan. While at school, he took part in singing competitions such as the Kerala University and inter-university competitions, winning several prizes.

After completing school in Trivandrum, Ravisankar took a degree in law from the Kerala Law Academy in Trivandrum, and a Post-Graduate Diploma in Personnel Management from Annamalai University. He started working as a lawyer, before switching to a career in music.

== Career ==
Ravisankar debuted in playback singing in 1999, with his first movie song, "Ponnolappanthalil Velippennayente Swayamvararajakumari Varumo...", recorded for the movie Saaphalyam, directed by G.S. Vijayan. The song was written by Kaithapram and composed by Sri M.G. Radhakrishnan. He is currently appearing on the program Raindrops on Kairali TV.

Ravisankar performed two songs for the movie Love Birds, and a song for the movie Devdaas, written by Gireesh Puthenchery. A career breathrought came when he sang "Chembarattikkamalitu kuppivala konjalittu..", a composition by M. Jayachandran, in the movie Maanikyakallu, a Pritviraj movie directed by M. Mohan. He continued with songs in a number of movies including Bombay Mittayi, Mr Bean, Garbhashreeman (music by Sri Ouseppanchan), and Innaana kalyanam(A Rajasenan movie with music by Bijibal). In 2015 he started contributing his own songs to projects including serials and albums, and made his debut music direction for a Malayalam movie called Crayons.

Apart from film music, Ravisankar has recorded several albums. He has also provided vocals to title songs for several television serials, including Uma, Vikramadityan, Dial 100, Tenali Raman, Abhirami, Jeeva Jalakom, and Kudumbam. Ravisankar is currently anchoring Raindrops, a live musical entertainment show on the Malayalam channel Kairali TV.

Ravishankar is married to Priyarenjini, a native of Kottayam and legal manager at Union bank [former Corporation Bank]. The couple has one daughter Bhadra.

== Discography ==
- "Ponnolappanthalil" – Saaphalyam
- "Ormakalil Nee" – Spandanam (Music Album) (2010)
- "Vanakokilaaravam" – Spandanam (Music Album) (2010)
- "Chemparathi Kammalittu" – Duet with Shreya Ghoshal for the movie Manikyakkallu (2011)
