= Nandana (disambiguation) =

Nandana may refer to:

== Places ==
- Nandana Fort, a ruined fort in Pakistan
- Nandana, Jammu and Kashmir, a village in Jammu and Kashmir, India

== People ==
- Nandana (actress) (born 1985), Indian actress
- Nandana Gunathilake (born 1962), Sri Lankan politician
- Nandana Mendis, Chief Minister of Western Province of Sri Lanka
- Nandana Millagala, Sri Lankan politician
- Nandana Padmakumara, Sri Lankan politician
- Nandana Sen, Indian-American actress
- Nandana Udawatta, Sri Lankan general

== See also ==
- Nandan (disambiguation)
- Nandanam (disambiguation)
- Nandanar (disambiguation)
- Devaki Nandana Vasudeva, Indian Telegu-Language action drama film
