= Mazhayathu =

- Theatrical release poster
- Directed by: Suveeran
- Written by: Suveeran
- Produced by: Spellbound Filmc Inc
- Starring: Nikesh Ram; Aparna Gopinath; Nandhana Varma; Manoj K Jayan; Shanthi Krishna; Sunil Sukhada; Santhosh Keezhattoor; Sivaji Guruvayoor
- Narrated by: Nandhana Varma
- Cinematography: Muralikrishnan
- Edited by: Vijayakumar
- Music by: Gopi Sunder
- Production company: Spellbound Release
- Distributed by: Spellbound Release
- Release date: 25 May 2018
- Running time: 133 minutes
- Country: India
- Language: Malayalam

Mazhayathu (transl. In The Rain) is a 2018 Indian Malayalam-language coming of age family drama film written and directed by Suveeran. Produced under the banner Spellbound Films Inc., the film features an ensemble cast consisting of Nikesh Ram, Aparna Gopinath, Nandhana Varma, Shanthi Krishna, Manoj K Jayan, Sunil Sukhada, Santhosh Keezhattoor, Nandu, Sivaji Guruvayoor, Sreeya Remesh, and Reshmi Boban.

== Plot ==
The story revolves around a Malayali middle-class family consisting of Venugopal, Anitha, and their daughter, Sreelakshmi alias Ummi. The couple, Venugopal and Anita, despite their usual tiffs, lead a healthy family life. Anita strives to be independent and tries to find a job for herself. Venugopal is a government employee and his love for his daughter knows no bounds. As far as Ummi is concerned, she needs her father's help for every single thing.

One day, an incident shakes the whole family and the happy life ends. Venugopal fails to make out the reason for people's angry reactions to seeing him. He is thunderstruck on realizing the reason, and the present-day news stories appear in different media in Kerala which are replete with related cases which add fuel to spreading rumours.

== Cast ==
- Nikesh Ram as Venugopal
- Aparna Gopinath as Anitha
- Nandhana Varma as Sreelakshmi alias Ummi
- Manoj K Jayan as Police Circle Inspector Raghu
- Sunil Sukhada as Police Constable Sudhi
- Shanthi Krishna as School Principal Anamika
- Reshmi Boban as Lissy Miss
- Santhosh Keezhattoor as Sathyan, Venugopal's Friend
- Sivaji Guruvayoor as Shaji, School Manager
- Nandu as Narayenettan, Venugopal's Friend
- Sreeya Remesh as Suma Aunty, Anitha's Friend

== Production ==
=== Development ===
After the film Athithi in Tamil, this is the second movie under production by Spellbound Films Inc. Their third movie was simultaneously under production in Tamil titled "MichaelPatty Rasavum Dubai Rosavum", which was released in May 2018.

=== Filming ===
The filming of Mazhayathu started on 30 August 2017 in Kuttiady. The shoot went on for 30 days in Vadakara, and the crew moved to Kannur district to complete the later part. The shoot went on for 15 days in Kannur and a few scenes were shot in Ernakulam and Chennai. The post-production work started by the end of November 2017.

== Music ==
The soundtrack features two songs composed by Gopi Sundar. The audio was released on 16 April 2018 at the Crowne Plaza Hotel in Dubai.

=== Track list ===
Track Name	Singer	Lyrics	Length	Notes
"Akalumbol"	Vijay Yesudas	Sivadas Purameri	3:00	
"Aaro Varunnathai "	Divya S. Menon	Sivadas Purameri	4:00	

== Release ==
The film was released on 25 May 2018 to mixed reviews.

=== Critical reception ===
Times of India Rating 3/5

== Awards and nominations ==
Year	Film	Award	Category	Nominee	Result	Ref.
2018	Mazhayathu	Toronto International Nollywood Film Festival TINFF Toronto Canada	Best Actor	Nikesh Ram	Won	
2018	Mazhayathu	Overcome Film Festival California USA	Best Actor	Nikesh Ram	Won	
2018	Mazhayathu	Asiavision Awards Dubai	Best Actor	Nikesh Ram	Won	
2018	Mazhayathu	Medellin International Film Festival Colombia	Best International Movie	Mazhayathu	Won	
