= Anandatandavapuram railway station =

Railway station in Tamil Nadu, India

Anandatandavapuram

General information
- Location: Anandathandavapuram, Mayiladuthurai district, Tamil Nadu; India
- Coordinates: 11.1446672°N 79.6587715°E
- Elevation: 10 metres (33 ft)
- System: Indian Railways station
- Owner: Indian Railways
- Operator: Southern Railway zone
- Line: Chennai Egmore–Thanjavur main line
- Platforms: 2
- Tracks: 2
- Connections: Auto rickshaw stand

Construction
- Structure type: Standard (on ground station)
- Parking: Available
- Accessible: Yes

Other information
- Status: Functioning
- Station code: ANP
- Zone(s): Southern Railway zone
- Division(s): Tiruchirappalli
- Fare zone: Indian Railways

History
- Opened: 1 July 1877
- Electrified: 28 January 2020
Location
- Location within Tamil Nadu Location within India

Anandatandavapuram railway station (station code: ANP), is a NSG–6 category railway station serving Anandatandavapuram, a village in Mayiladuthurai district, Tamil Nadu, India. The station is part of the Southern Railway zone of Indian Railways and is administered by the Tiruchirappalli railway division. The station lies on the Chennai Egmore–Thanjavur main line.

== Location and layout ==
The railway station is located on the Mayiladuthurai to Anathandavapuram road, and is about 0.5 km (0.31 mi) for the Anathandavapuram bus stop. The nearest airport is situated 117 km (73 mi) away at Tiruchirappalli.

== Lines ==
The station was opened on 1 July 1877 as part of the 19.71 km (12.25 mi) Mayiladuthurai – Sirkazhi section on the Chennai Egmore–Thanjavur main line. It is situated between Mayiladuthurai and Vaithisvarankoil railway stations.

The station has direct daily services to destinations including Villupuram, Chidambaram, Mayiladuthurai and Thanjavur railway stations.

== See also ==
- Navagraha temple
- Mayuranathaswami temple
- Poompuhar
- Ananthathandesvarar Temple, Kanjaru
