= Nikesh =

Nikesh is an Indian masculine given name. Notable people with the name include:

- Nikesh Patel (born 1985), British actor
- Nikesh Arora (born 1968), Indian-American business executive
- Nikesh Shukla (born 1980), British author and screenwriter
- Nikesha Patel, British-Indian actress
- Nikesh Ram, Indian businessman and actor
