= Nandan =

Nandan may refer to:

== Places ==
- Nandan County, in Guangxi Province, China
- Nandan, Hyōgo, a town in Mihara District, Hyōgo Prefecture, Japan
- Nandan (Kolkata), a cultural center in Kolkata in the Indian state of West Bengal
- Nandana Fort, ruined fort in Punjab, Pakistan

== People ==
- Nandan of Ezhimalai, a Sangam Period ruler in South India
- Nandana (actress), Indian actress
- Nandana Gunathilake (1962–2026), a Sri Lankan politician, Member of Parliament (2000–2010)
- Nandana Millagala, a Sri Lankan politician
- Nandana Sen, an Indian-born American actress, screenwriter, children's author, and child-rights activist
- Nandana Varma, Indian actress primarily in Malayalam cinema
- Meera Nandan (born 1989), an Indian actress
- Satendra Nandan (born 1940), a Fiji-Indian academic and politician
- Satya Nandan, a Fiji-Indian diplomat and lawyer
- Nandan Nilekani (born 1955), Indian entrepreneur
- C. K. Nandan, an Indian cricket umpire

== Other uses ==
- Nandan, a Hindi-language children's magazine published by HT Media
- Nándàn (男旦)]], specialized male actors who play female roles (dàn) in Chinese opera
- Nandana, the heavenly garden of Indra in Svarga in Hunduism

== See also ==
- Nandhini (disambiguation)
- Nandanam (disambiguation)
- Nandanar (disambiguation)
- Nandankanan (disambiguation)
