= Bharathan (Tamil director) =

Indian filmmaker

- Born: Bharathan; Jamin Avalapampatti, Periya Negamam, Coimbatore, Tamil Nadu, India
- Years active: 2001–present

Bharathan is an Indian filmmaker and writer who works in Tamil films. He has directed with actor Vijay thrice his career.

== Career ==
He initially began his career as a dialogue writer to film director Dharani and penned dialogues for the Vikram-starrer Dhill (2001), Dhool (2003) and Vijay-starrer Ghilli (2004), as well as for Madhesh's Madhurey (2004). Since then, he has intermittently been credited as a dialogue writer, most notably working on Ajith Kumar's Veeram (2014) which was directed by Siva.

Bharathan made his directorial debut with the thriller film Azhagiya Tamil Magan (2007) starring Vijay and Shriya Saran in the lead roles and Had a renowned technical crew, including music composed by A. R. Rahman the film ended as a hit at the box office after its re-release. His second film, the thriller Athithi (2014) featuring Nandha and Nikesh Ram, opened to mixed reviews . He later worked with Vijay again in Bairavaa (2017), with the film taking a strong opening at the box office.

== Filmography ==
=== As film director ===
Year	Film	Ref.
2007	Azhagiya Tamil Magan	
2014	Athithi	
2017	Bairavaa	

=== As dialogue writer ===
Year	Film	Ref.
2001	Dhill	
2003	Dhool	
2004	Ghilli	
2004	Madhurey	
2007	Ninaithaley	
2011	Osthe	
2014	Veeram	
