= Nandhini =

Nandhini may refer to:

- Nandhini (film), a 1997 Indian Tamil-language film
- Nandini (TV series), a 2017-2018 Indian soap opera
- Nandhini (anti-liquor-activist), Indian temperance activist
- Arunaa Nandhini, India novelist writing in Tamil

== See also ==
- Nandan (disambiguation)
