= Munaiyaduvar =

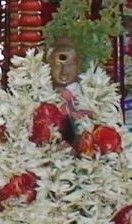

Personal life
- Born: Tiru-Nidur, Mayiladuthurai
- Honors: Nayanar saint,

Religious life
- Religion: Hinduism
- Philosophy: Shaivism, Bhakti

Munaiyaduvar, also known as Manai Aduvar Nayanar, Munaiyaduvar Nayanar, Munayaduvar, Munayaduvaar, Munaiyaduvaar and Munaiyatuvar, was a Nayanar saint, venerated in the Hindu sect of Shaivism. He is generally counted as the 52nd in the list of 63 Nayanars. Munaiyaduvar is described as a mercenary soldier, who would fight for the weak and vanished and use the fees received in service of his patron deity Shiva and the god's devotees.

== Life ==
The life of Munaiyaduvar is described in seven stanzas in the Periya Puranam by Sekkizhar (12th century), which is a hagiography of the 63 Nayanars. His name literally means "he who fights in war".

Munaiyaduvar was born in Tiru-Nidur in the Chola kingdom. Tiru-Nidur is known as Nidur (Needur) and is located in Mayiladuthurai district of Indian state of Tamil Nadu. He was a Vellalar, a caste of agricultural land owners. He was a staunch devotee of the god Shiva, the patron of Shaivism. He served Shiva and his devotees. He was skilled in warfare and worked as a mercenary soldier. The defeated would come to hire him and promised him great booty. Munaiyaduvar would assist them by winning battles for them and would return with gold and gifts. He would use the acquired wealth to welcome and feed the devotees of Shiva. After living a long year of service to Shiva, he attained Kailash, Shiva's abode after death.

In a commentary on Munaiyaduvar's tale, the Hindu spiritual teacher Swami Sivananda notes the narrative of the Nayanar saint's life imparts two lessons. Even though he was an accomplished mercenary warrior, Munaiyaduvar sided only with the weak, thus advocating righteousness. According to the Nayanar, his might was also a manifestation of God and thus was to be used only for virtuous causes. Secondly, the fortunes the saint gained were offered entirely in service of God. Sivananda suggests following Munaiyaduvar's exemplar, one must be unselfish and dedicate oneself to God.

== Remembrance ==
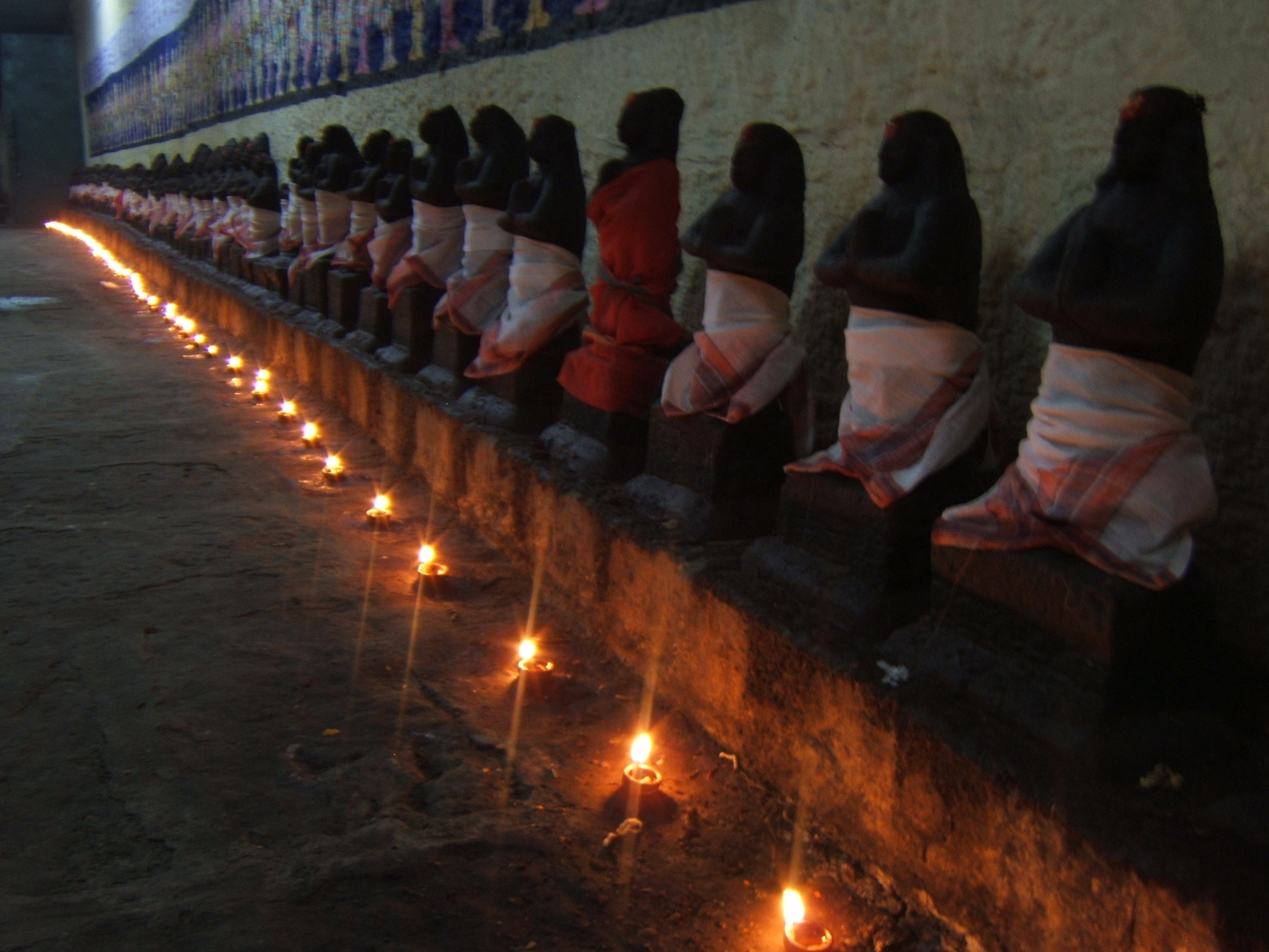
The images of the Nayanars are found in many Shiva temples in Tamil Nadu.

One of the most prominent Nayanars, Sundarar (8th century) venerates Munaiyaduvar in the Tiruthonda Thogai, a hymn to Nayanar saints, which praises him as Prince Manaiyatuvan who wields a spear in war.

Munaiyaduvar is worshipped in the Tamil month of Panguni, when the moon enters the Pushya nakshatra (lunar mansion). He is depicted with a crown, folded hands (see Anjali mudra) and a mace in crook of the arm. He receives collective worship as part of the 63 Nayanars. Their icons and brief accounts of his deeds are found in many Shiva temples in Tamil Nadu. Their images are taken out in procession in festivals.

Munaiyaduvar is especially associated with Somanathaswami temple - dedicated to Shiva - in his home-town Needur. Shiva is said to have appeared before him here. Munaiyaduvar also used his wealth for the upkeep and renovation of the temple. A shrine is dedicated to him in the temple. The temple also has a festival icon of Nayanar, which is taken in procession on the Panguni Pushya day.
