= Nandanar =

Nayanar saint

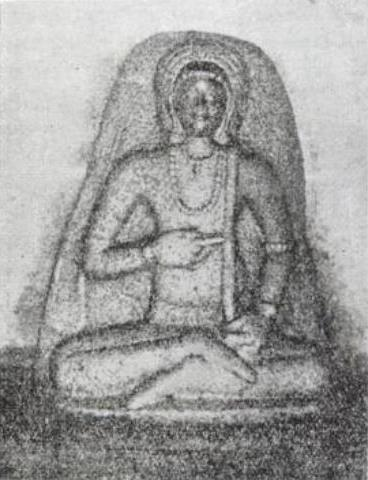
- Icon in the Tirupunkur temple

Personal life
- Born: c. 7th-8th century CE Adhanur
- Honors: Nayanar saint

Religious life
- Religion: Hinduism
- Philosophy: Shaivism, Bhakti

Nandanar (also spelt as Nantanar), also known as Thirunaallaippovaar (transl. The one who will go tomorrow) and Tirunallaipovar Nayanar, (Note: Other names include: Nandan (Nanda, Nantan), Tirunalaipovanar, Nalaippovar, Nalaippovan) was a Nayanar saint, who is venerated in the Hindu sect of Shaivism. He is generally counted as the eighteenth in the list of 63 Nayanars. Like the other Nayanars, he was a devout devotee of the god Shiva.

The tale of Nandanar is retold numerous times in folk tales, folk music, plays, films and literature in Tamil society. While Nandanar is included in Nayanar list since the 8th century CE, the 12th century CE Periya Puranam gives a full biographical account of his life. The tale focuses on two miracles attributed to him. In Sivalokanathar Temple, Tirupunkur; his prayers are said to have moved a giant stone bull, which still appears in the moved position in the temple. Nandanar is said to have ritually purified himself by fire at Thillai Nataraja Temple, Chidambaram. Nandar's tale features in temple lore and religious literature related to both these temples. Gopalakrishna Bharati's 19th-century retelling of the saint's life remains the basis of many later retellings. It expands the original narrative adding elements of oppression of the Dalit saint by higher castes. While the original account of the Periya Puranam focuses on the saint's observance of caste norms, Dalit retellings emphasize his exploitation and superior religiosity.

Apart from collective worship Nandanar enjoys being part of the Nayanars in Shiva temples of Tamil Nadu, shrines depicted to Nandanar exist in both the sites of his miracles. The saint also became an icon of protest in Dalit rights movements.

== Accounts of life ==
One of the most prominent Nayanars, Sundarar (8th century) is the first to name Nandanar (called Tirunalaipovar) in literature, however Tirunalaipovar ('The one who will go tomorrow') relates to the tale of Nandanar longing to visit Chidambaram; no details of his life are revealed. In the eleventh century, Nambiyandar Nambi devotes a stanza to Nandanar in his Tiruttondar Tiruvandhadhi while recalling the lives of the Nayanars. Tirunalaipovar is described as a Pulayar (Pulaiya, Pulai) who lived in Adhanur. He is said to have visited Thillai Nataraja Temple, Chidambaram of his patron god Shiva "by God's grace" and "three thousand Brahmins (priests) of Chidambaram saluted him."

The earliest full (and primary religious) account of Nandanar's life is found in the Tamil Periya Puranam by Sekkizhar (12th century), which is a hagiography of the 63 Nayanars, but it was the Nandanar Charitram by the Tamil poet Gopalakrishna Bharati (1810–1896) brought Nandanar's tale to public attention. The Nandanar Charitam (printed in 1861), the magnum opus of Bharati, added new elements to Sekkizhar's tale. Though it is unknown when he lived exactly, generally he is dated to 7th or 8th century CE.

=== The Periya Puranam ===
The Periya Puranam narrates that Nandanar belonged to Adhanur (Adanoor) in the Chola kingdom. He was born in the Pulaiya caste, who were regarded "untouchables" (see Dalits). They were agricultural labourers and singers. Another description considers Nandanar from the Dalit caste of Paraiyar, who served as labourers and were drummers as per the caste code.

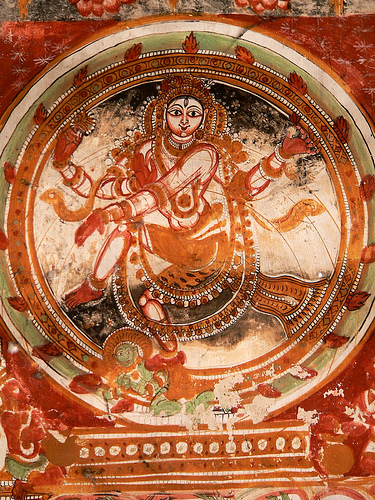
Nandanar was longing to see the icon of Nataraja in Thillai Nataraja Temple, Chidambaram. A fresco in the temple depicting Nataraja.

Nandanar was born in poverty, in Pulaippadi, the Pulai slums of Adhanur. He was a staunch devotee of the god Shiva, the patron god of Shaivism. He was a leather maker, who crafted drums and other musical instruments. He also served as a village servant, a watchman, a labourer as well as the "town crier", who used to beat the drums. In Nandanar's times, Dalits were not allowed to enter Hindu temples. So, Nandanar would stand outside a Shiva temple and sing the praises of Shiva and dance. However, he harboured a strong urge to pay his respects to the icon of Shiva at Sivalokanathar Temple, Tirupunkur. He stood outside the temple, but a huge stone Nandi (the bull mount of Shiva, whose sculpture is generally seen in Shiva temples, facing Shiva in the garbhagriha - sanctum sanctorum) blocked his path of vision. The compassionate Shiva ordered Nandi to move a little to side and the bull complied, allowing the Nayanar to see the central icon of Shiva, unobstructed. Nandanar cleaned up the surroundings of the temple and dug a pond (which serves as the temple tank) in honour of Shiva. He circumambulated the shrine and returned to Adanur.

Nandanar visited many temples of Shiva and served the god. Once, he longed to visit the Thillai Nataraja Temple of Chidambaram, which enshrines Shiva as Nataraja, the Lord of Dance. He used to say everyday that he will go the next day to Chidambaram, but never actually dared to step in the holy town, where he was prohibited entry. Thus, he came to be known as "Tiru-Nalai-povar", 'he who will go tomorrow'. Finally, Nandanar reached the boundary of Chidambaram, but feared to set foot in the town. He saw the smoke of fire sacrifices and heard the chants of the Vedic scriptures. Thinking about how he can see Nataraja's dancing icon, the Nayanar circumambulated the town numerous times and finally succumbed to fatigue and slept. Shiva appeared in his dream and told Nandanar to enter the temple through a holy fire. The god also informed the Brahmin priests of Chidambaram to prepare a pyre. Next day, the Brahmins approached Nandanar as per the divine order.

Nandanar entered the holy fire chanting the name of Shiva and reappeared in a new purified form. He looked like a Brahmin sage, wearing matted hair (characteristic of a Shaiva) and the sacred thread worn by Brahmins across his chest. His body was smeared with sacred ash. The gods showered flowers on the Nayanar from heaven and the Brahmins cheered. With the Brahmins, Nandanar went in the garbhagriha and saw Nataraja. The Nayanar disappeared in the image of Nataraja and became one with Shiva.

The Periya Puranam version is interpreted as a Brahmanical narrative, where a particular Dalit is granted salvation by transforming into a Brahmin; the superiority of the Brahmins is reinforced and the legitimacy of the ban of Dalits is not challenged.

=== The Nandanar Charitam ===
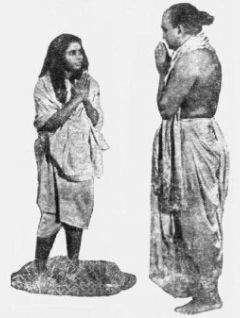
K. B. Sundarambal (left) as Nandanar and Maharajapuram Viswanatha Iyer as Vediyar in the 1935 film Nandanar.

Bharati was an ardent devotee of Shiva and wrote three operas in honour of various Nayanar saints. Though Bharati was himself an upper caste Brahmin, he was a crusader for the rights of the Dalits. While Sekkizhar exalts Nandanar's devotion to Shiva, Bharati presents the grim reality of ostracization that the Nayanar suffered. Bharati's Nandanar is "not a rebel, but only a protester". The Nandanar Charitam focuses on the atrocities that Nandanar and Dalits as a whole had to suffer at the hands of upper castes. The opera Nandanar Charitam was embedded with the social message that Shiva grants emancipation irrespective of caste.

The play starts with the term "May I come", a warning to higher-caste people that Dalits had to cry out before entering any street, so as to not pollute the higher caste members. The Nayanar first clashes with his own Dalit brethren. They oppose his devotion for the Lord of Chidambaram, whom they call a Brahmin god. The Dalit elders — headed by Pariyakilavan — define his duties as a pariah and advise him to not confront caste rules. They tell him to worship the folk deities of the pariah, instead of Shiva, the god of Brahmanical Hinduism. The Dalits also feel that Nandanar needs to abide by the social norms and give up his taboo idea of entering a temple.

A villainous Brahmin landlord Vetiyar (Vediyar) appears in Bharati's tale. He torments his bonded labourer Nandanar and chastises him repeatedly for trying to go beyond caste norms. Vetiyar sees Nandanar's bhakti and desire to enter a temple "not only as undesirable and irreligious, but also as a serious threat to his social status." Vetiyar refuses to grant him permission to Chidambaram and even resorts to violence. After much persuasion, the Brahmin relents on the condition that the saint do an impossible task of cultivating and harvesting the field in one night. Aided by Shiva's attendant ganas, the saint completes the task. The Brahmin realizes the piety of the Nayanar, apologizes to him and lets him go.

Bharati retained the final confrontation with the Brahmins of Chidambaram and his ritual purification by fire. Bharati concludes in a poem saying that "it is said in the epics that the Lord worshipped by Gopalakrishna granted salvation even to Untouchables!"

=== Variants ===
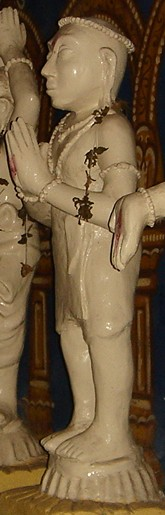
Nandanar depicted as part of the Nayanars group.

In stories of higher caste Hindus (especially Brahmins), Nandanar is a Brahmin or God himself somehow trapped in the body of an untouchable and whose true form is revealed by the fire trial. Other tales focus on his strict adherence to caste norms, his obedience of his Brahmin master and his refusal to enter the holy temple as an untouchable.

The Dalits strongly believe in his piety and portray Brahmins as the root cause of all the misery of the Nayanar. Nandanar fits in the Dalit narrative that proves that their religiosity is on par or superior to the higher castes. They say that Nandanar was 'swallowed by God'. The sashes round Nataraja's waist are interpreted as the legs of the saint, who merged into the god.

The temple lore of Tirupunkur narrates that Shiva instructed his son Ganesha to aid Nandanar in digging the temple tank named Nandanar tirtha, after the saint. Another variant tells that Ganesha dug up the tank in the night so that Nandanar can bathe in its sacred waters before seeing Shiva in the temple.

In the early half of the 20th century, the novel Nandan, by A. Gopalasami Iyengar and G. Aravamudha Iyengar, includes reformist Brahmin characters that argue Nandan's case against their peers. Nandan also echoes the reformist ideas of Hindu spiritual leaders like Ramanuja and Vivekananda, and progressive upper-caste leaders.

The short story Puthiya Nandan by Pudhumaipithan (1906-1948) places the classical tale of the Nayanar in a contemporary setting. While retelling Nandan's ancient tale, it also alludes to the Dalit rights movements of Mahatma Gandhi and Periyar E. V. Ramasamy (see Self-Respect Movement).

Indira Parthasarathy's Nandan Kathai (1978) builds the tale of Nandanar (referred in the work as Nandan) further, introducing two non-Brahmin upper caste landholders, who are as ruthless as Bharati's Vediyar. Nandanar is portrayed as a lover of art, rather than God. He wants to see the cosmic dance of Nataraja. A Devadasi called Abhirami also appears; no significant female characters are found in earlier narratives. Indira is blunt in reprimanding the Dalits for not understanding Nandanar. Nandan Kathai is a quest for liberation of Dalits and women alike. Unlike earlier narratives, Indira's tale is devoid of miracles and is a story of how Nandanar falls prey to a conspiracy. The Vediyar-priest, the Vediyar-landlord and the two non-Brahmin upper caste landholders, hatch a plot to end Nandan. They make Nandanar believe that God harvested crop from the field, an allusion to the miracle of Vediyar's impossible task in Bharati's work. Then, they persuade him to organize a dance contest between Bharatnatyam, the high-caste elites' dance and the folk dance of the Dalits. Finally, in the climax, Nandanar agrees to undergo a fire-trial, reassured by the earlier miracle, but he and Abhirami burn in the flames. The upper castes succeed in sending a warning to Dalits how trespassers of the caste code, longing for salvation, would be punished.

== Celebration in Hindu religion ==
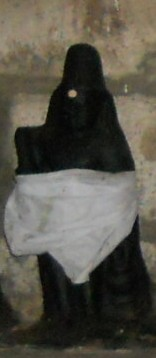
Nandanar depicted as part of the Nayanars group, with a kamandalu and danda (staff) in hand

Nandanar is specially worshipped in the Tamil month of Purattasi, when the moon enters the Rohini nakshatra (lunar mansion). He is depicted with a shaved head, folded hands (see Anjali mudra) with a kamandalu and a danda (staff), like a seer. He receives collective worship as part of the 63 Nayanars. Their icons and brief accounts of his deeds are found in many Shiva temples in Tamil Nadu. Their images are taken out in procession in festivals.

A water tank in Chidambaram is considered sacred as it is believed to be the site of Nandanar's fire-purification. A "recently built" (as mentioned in the 1992 book) small shrine dedicated to the Nayanar, exists in south-west part of the town, whose name means 'Nandanar has become the temple'. A sculpture of Nandanar as a singer is found in the Chidambaram temple, besides another in Airavatesvara Temple of Darasuram (12th century) depicting him in the trial by fire.

Sundarar venerates Nandanar in the Tiruthonda Thogai, a hymn to Nayanar saints, calling him "Nalaippovan", the "holy pilgrim" who will go tomorrow. An earlier hymn to Shiva praises the god who is served by Nalaippovan. The devotional poet Tyagaraja (1767–1847) also narrates the tale of Nandanar in his poems.

Devotional works dedicated to Nataraja of the Chidambaram temple narrate Nandanar's tale. Umapathi Sivacharya's Kunchitangristava (early fourteenth century) mentions Nandan's legend. While another Sanskrit work Hemasabhanatha Mahatmya devotes its ninth chapter to the Nayanar. The Sthala Purana of the Nataraja temple called Chidambara Mahatmya praises the god as served by Nandan.

The Nandi in Sivalokanathar Temple, Tirupunkur is seen placed off centre as a testimony of Nandanar's devotion and the miracle. A stone image of the saint is worshipped in the temple. The Dvarapalas (gate-keeper sculptures) are depicted with his heads leaning downwards, said to be in honour of Nandanar. In 1959, a shrine was created outside the Shiva temple, from where the stone image of Nandanar looks eternally at Shiva. Nandanar is depicted with his hands joined above his head, praying to Shiva. Scenes of Bharati's opera and the local legend of Nandanar and Ganesha digging the temple tank are seen on the shrine.

== Remembrance in society ==
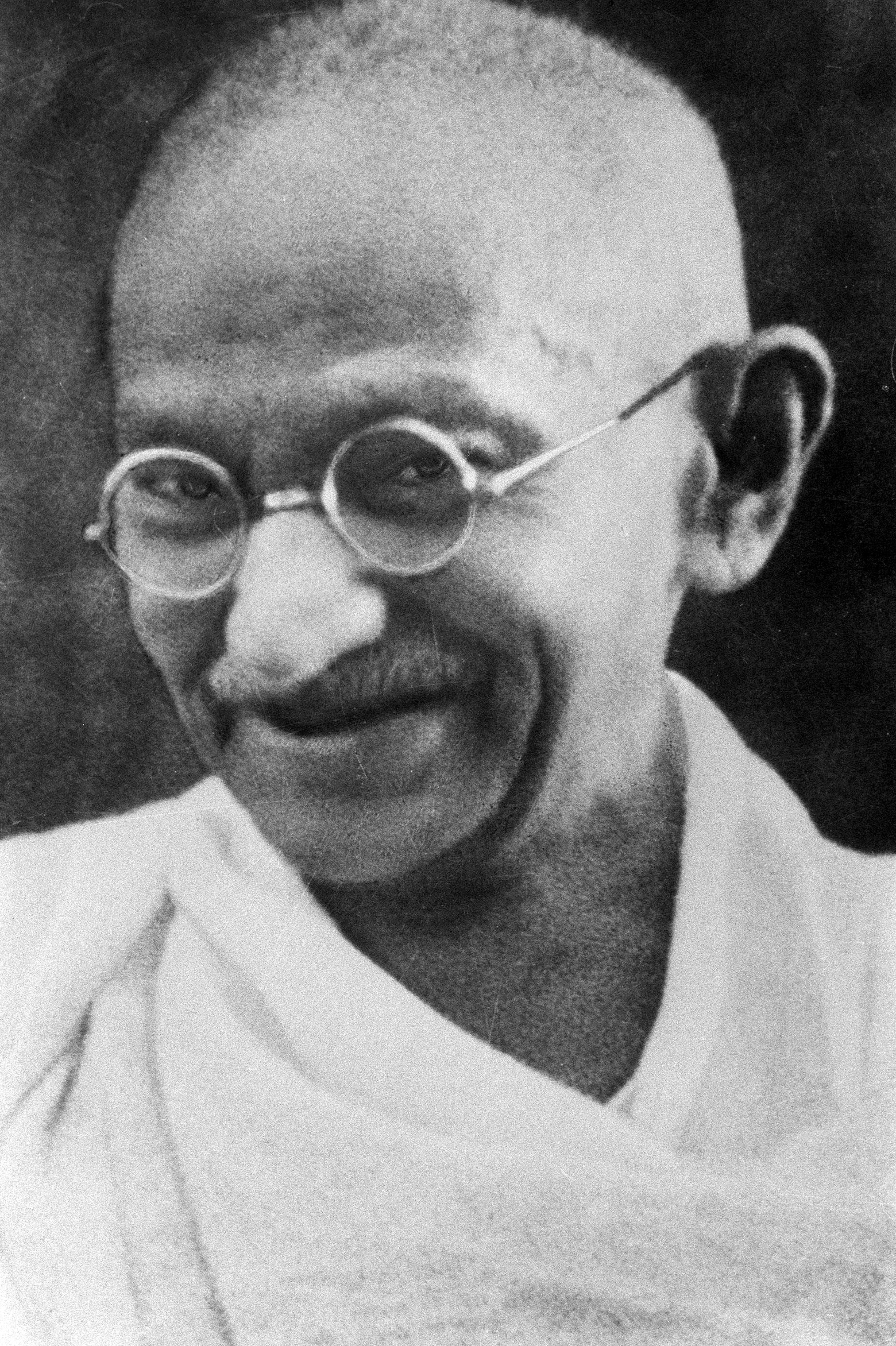
Mahatma Gandhi (pictured) regarded Nandanar as a true practitioner of Satyagraha, a means of Nonviolent resistance.

Nandanar's influence was and remains limited primarily to the Tamil-speaking areas. The Christian missionary Rev. A. C. Clayton—who was "sympathetic" to the Dalit cause—used Nandanar's narrative (retold as The Legend of Nandan) to suggest that bhakti (devotion)—which saw no distinction of class or caste—was the superior means to salvation than the jnana-marga (salvation by knowledge) propagated by the Brahmins and also challenged the authority of the Brahmin orthodoxy.

Nandanar became "the hero of tales of caste protest". The "Adi Dravida" (Dalit) leaders of the Self-Respect Movement used Nandanar as an exemplar to prove that social superiority originates not from birth, but the qualities and deeds of people. In 2010, Cadres of the Tamil Nadu Untouchability Eradication Front (TNUEF) and the Communist Party of India (Marxist) under the leadership of P. Samath, protested to bring down the wall on the South Gate of the Chimdabaram temple, which was—as per a tale—built as Nandanar entered from the gate. The walled gate was the symbol of the oppression of the Dalit caste and caste discrimination, as per the protesters who demanded its demolition. The state government — which currently governs the temple — contented that the veracity of Nandanar's tale and its connection to the walled Gate, cannot be ascertained. Thus, it — contented that the veracity of Nandanar's tale and its connection to the walled Gate, cannot be ascertained and thus, refused the protesters' demands. P.Sampath, president of the Tamil Nadu Untouchability Eradication Front (TNUEF) and an office-bearer politician from the Tamil Nadu unit of Communist Party of India (Marxist) (known as CPI (M)), calls the Chidambaram fire-trail as Brahmin propaganda to conceal the truth that Nandanar was burnt at the stake. Basu suggests that Nandanar "continues to inspire them (Dalits) as a symbol of resistance and a hope of a better future". However, as per Aktor, young Dalits identify with recent Dalit leaders like B. R. Ambedkar and are unaware or uninterested in the "obedient Nandanar". Ambedkar, himself had dedicated his book The Untouchables, to three Dalit saints, including Nandanar.

In speech in Chidambaram, Mahatma Gandhi called Nandanar, a true practitioner of Satyagraha, a means of Nonviolent resistance. Gandhi said: "Nanda broke every barrier and won his way to freedom, not by brag, not by bluster, but by the purest form of self-suffering... he shamed them [his persecutors] into doing justice by his lofty prayer, by the purity of his character, ... he compelled God himself to descend and made Him open the eyes of his persecutors".

Nandanar's tale is retold numerous times through folk tales, plays, literature and art forms like Villu Paatu and "musical discourses". A number of Tamil films, all titled Nandanar, recall Nandanar's tale following Bharati's version. Besides a silent film in 1923, another silent film Nandanar, subtitled The Elevation of the Downtrodden, directed by P. K. Raja Sandow, in 1930. The first talkie film on Nandanar was made in 1931. The 1935 film featured K. B. Sundarambal, who also performed on stage as the Nayanar numerous times. The 1942 film, starring Dandapani Desikar in the lead, courted controversy for its overly Brahmin overtones and was banned in Kolar Gold Fields after protests by Dalits, however the ban was lifted after Desikar met and personally apologized to the Dalits for being part of the climax, which featured the fire-purification. Another film on Nandanar was released in 1943. S. Balachander acted in the 1948 film. N. S. Krishnan presented the story as a "narrative art form", while A. Padmanabhan released a small booklet on the saint's life for children. C. T. Indra says that Nandanar was made immortal in legend and remembered over the years "as a strategy of public management of anxiety. ... In the Essentialist way, Nandan's devotion was cited down the ages to play down the social inequities and play up his spiritual qualifications."
