= Gopalakrishna Bharati =

Tamil poet and Carnatic music composer

- கோபாலகிருஷ்ண பாரதி
- Born: 1811; Narimanam, Tamil Nadu, India
- Died: 1881 (aged 69–70)
- Occupations: Composer; Poet
- Known for: Composing devotional Tamil kritis
- Notable work: Nandanar Charitram, Sabhapatikku Veru Daivam

Gopalakrishna Bharathi (Tamil: கோபாலகிருஷ்ண பாரதி) (1811–1881) was a Tamil poet and composer of Carnatic music. He composed the Kathakalakshepam (Tamil: கதாகாலக்ஷேபம்) Nandanar Charitram, two other works in this genre, and many independent kritis.

Bharathi was a contemporary of Thyagaraja whom he is said to have met, and who asked him whether he had composed anything in the raga Ābhōgi. Bharathi composed overnight one of his most popular kritis in Rupaka Tala, Sabhapatikku Veru. The great Tamil literary figure, U. V. Swaminatha Iyer wrote two sources for Bhaarati's life: a biography of the composer and his own autobiography, which contains references to Bharathi, who was his guru in music.

An annual music festival dedicated to the composer Gopalakrishna Bharathi is held every year at the Vallalar–Medha Dakshinamurthy Temple in Mayiladuthurai, featuring performances of his compositions.

== Early life ==
Gopalakrishna Bharathi was born at Narimanam, near Nagapattinam. He spent his early days in Mudikondan, near Thiruvarur. A few years later he moved to Anandathandavapuram village, near Mayavaram also known as Mayiladuthurai where he lived almost his entire life. His father, grandfather, and great-grandfather were all veena exponents and scholars in Sanskrit. After losing his parents at an early age, he worked as a cook in a temple. He then met Govinda Yati, who taught him Hindu scripture, and then the musician Ramdas, who taught him Hindustani music. Gopalakrishna started his professional career after finding a patron named Annu Iyer.

== Compositions ==
Gopalakrishna Bharathi composed several kritis on the principles of advaita. Gopalakrishna Bharathi's kritis, portraying several musical facades, were extremely well received by the public and were sung in a number of concerts during his lifetime. This prompted several musicians to approach Gopalakrishna Bharathi. The musicians would express his vision for a new kirtana and Bharathi would always oblige and compose a song to fit the musician's requirement.

The Nandanar Caritram is a Kathakalakshepam, a genre of religious story-telling with music that was popular in Tamil Nadu in the 19th and early 20th centuries before the advent of film, especially the talkies. Nandanar Caritiram was based on the story of a paraiyAr (dalit or 'untouchable'), Nandanar known also as Tirunallaipovar Nayanar. A great devotee of Siva, he yearned to visit Chidambaram the greatest of Siva temples. He greatly feared that caste prejudice would prevent him from entering the temple, but his devotion overcame this obstacle, and he obtained his desire, becoming physically merged with Siva in a blaze of light. Bharati's version of Nandanar Carittiram is a masterly development of the story narrated in Sekkizhar's Periya Puranam. He included many forms of Tamil regional music and is praised for his ability to capture dialect and popular expression. The eminent Tamil literary scholar, Meenakshisundaram Pillai, however, criticised him for deviating from historical facts of the story, and for grammatical lapses.

Gopalakrishna Bharati used the mudra (signature) Gopalakrishna in his compositions. These include famous Kritis like Varugalamo (raga manji), Varuvaro (sama) and Enneramum (raga Devagandhari).

Composition	Raga	Tala	Type	Language	Notes	Audio Links
eppo varuvAro	Jonpuri	Adi	Kriti	Tamil		
guruvaruLum tiruvaruLum	Abhogi	Khanda Chapu	Kriti	Tamil	Though listed as a composition of Bharati, this is commonly attributed Gowri Shankara Stapathi.	
sabhApatikku vEru deivam samAnamAgumA	Abhogi	Rupaka	Kriti	Tamil		
Innamum sandeha padalamo	Keeravani	Misrachapu	Kriti	Tamil		
Tha Thai Endraduvar	Sindu Bhairavi	Adi	Kriti	Tamil	Part of the Nandanar Caritram.	

== Performance history ==
Nandan Caritiram, as performed by Bharathi, proved very popular and he published it in his lifetime. The highly regarded Thanjavur Krishna Bhagavatar, who developed the art of kathakalakshepam by introducing elements from Marathi performance practice and elements of dance, made it one of his masterpieces. Many adaptations appeared, including stage plays and three film versions. Individual songs of Gopalakrishna Bharathi became popular with Carnatic musicians. Later, Bharata Natyam dancers, including T. Balasaraswati, took up select pieces for interpretation as abhinaya. The album of the film version starring the singer M. M. Dandapani Desikar as Nandanar (with music direction by Papanasam Sivan) remains popular.

The story of Nandanar, as Bharati developed it, had considerable resonance with the Nationalist movement in India. Nandanar was an untouchable (dalit), and M. K. Gandhi, among others, saw his story as expressing the plight and aspirations of India's dalits. Others argue that Nandanar, with his burning desire to see Shiva at Chidambaram, captured the mood and paralleled the aspirations of Indian nationalists yearning for independence from Britain.

== Publication ==
Bharati's kathakalakshepams were so popular in Karaikal that several government officials would sleep at work after spending the whole night listening to his performances. Karaikal was then a French colony and the official Cisse decided to conduct an inquiry into the reason behind the inefficiency of his employees. His investigations led him to conclude that the cause was in fact Bharathi. Curious, he decided to pay a visit personally to one of Bharathi's concerts. Cisse was so impressed by Bharathi's performance that he decided to help him publish his work as a book. This eventually led to the publication of Nandanar Charithram, one of Bharati's most popular works.

== See also ==
- List of Carnatic composers
