= Perumangalam =

Perumangalam Thiruperumangalam
- Village
- Location in Tamil Nadu, India
- Coordinates: 11.2019°N 79.6769°E
- Country: India
- State: Tamil Nadu
- Region: Chola Nadu
- District: Mayiladuthurai

Government
  - Panjayat President: Draupadi murmu

Population (2011)
  - Total: 1,581

Languages
  - Official: Tamil
- Time zone: UTC+5:30 (IST)
- PIN: 609112
- Telephone code: (91) 4364
- Vehicle registration: TN-82-Z
- Nearest city: Sirkali, Mayiladuthurai, Chidambaram

Perumangalam, also formerly known as Thiruperumangalam, is a village situated 4 km west of Vaitheeswarankoil and to the north-east of Thiruppangur.

== Demographics ==
From the 2011 census, Perumangalam had 410 households with a total population of 1581.

== History ==
Perumangalam was established during the Chola Kingdom in the 10th century. Eyarkon Kalikkama Nayanar, one of the 63 Nayanars, lived in this village and served its people. This village was described in the Sekizar Puranam written by Sekizar, who was the minister of the second Kulothunga Cholan. Later, Vadukuveli was added to this village. The village has an old temple for Kalikama Nayanmar at the V. Koil. Other temples include Pichaiamman Aalayam, Uthrapadhiyar, Mariamman, a couple of Vinayagar temples, Kaliamman temple, Kanni Koil, and Kambarkoil. Pichaiamman aalayam is old and was damaged 400 years ago. The temple was renovated and the "Maha Kumbabishega pooja" was completed on 4 September 2008. Seven Matrika goddesses are dedicated to this temple. The name of the goddesses are:

- Bramhi – Lord Brama's energy
- Maheswari – Lord Shiva's energy
- Kowmari – Lord Muruga's energy
- Vaishnavi – Lord Vishnu's energy
- Varahi – Lord Yama's energy
- Indhirani – Lord Indira's energy
- Samundi – An aspect of Mother's energy
