= Ring Master =

- Directed by: Rafi
- Written by: Rafi
- Produced by: Vaishak Rajan
- Starring: Dileep; Keerthy Suresh; Honey Rose; Kalabhavan Shajon; Suraj Venjaramoodu
- Cinematography: Shaji Kumar
- Edited by: Shyam Sasidharan
- Music by: Gopi Sunder
- Production company: Vaishaka Cynyma
- Distributed by: Vaishaka Cynyma & Popcorn Entertainments
- Release date: 12 April 2014
- Running time: 153 minutes
- Country: India
- Language: Malayalam
- Budget: ₹7 cr
- Box office: ₹25 cr

Ring Master is a 2014 Indian Malayalam-language comedy film written and directed by Rafi, starring Dileep in the role of a dog trainer in clinic. Keerthy Suresh, Honey Rose, Kalabhavan Shajon, Suraj Venjaramoodu, and Guinness Pakru play the other characters. The film was released on 12 April 2014 to positive response. The film was a commercial success at the box office.

== Plot ==
The movie starts with Prince, who is working as dog trainer in a dog clinic owned by his friend Dr. Muthu, and Peter is filming a documentary of the clinic. His life changes when an affluent rich lady Elizabeth and her female dog Lisa enters his life. Elizabeth appoints Prince as a caretaker for her dogs on the condition that Lisa, one of her pet should never get pregnant. However, Prince fails at the dire moment, when Toby, the guide dog of visually challenged Karthika mates with Lisa. Things get worse, when Lisa delivers four puppies, but unfortunately she dies in labor, along with three of her kids. Prince names the lone puppy 'Diana', whom he raises with utmost care. Despite a rough start, Prince and Karthika gets along and become close friends. Diana becomes famous after she acts in a movie which marks Peter's directional debut, which eventually becomes a superhit. Later on she does a movie with the actress Diana who had betrayed Prince earlier.

A heartbroken Prince once remembers all about his sweet past with the then student Diana, whose real name was Sarasamma. It was upon her father's request that Prince came up with the new name for his prospective sweetheart. As Diana grew to be talented and a beautiful woman, Prince strived to the fullest to bring her to the silver screen. As fame, followed by a sense of ungratefulness begins to rack in, Diana publicly disowned Prince, which made him an object of heavy ridicule in front of his people. It was that humiliation which pitted Prince to go all out against his former love interest.

Prince, with a huge support of his friends, including Karthika, survives every plot the actress Diana sets against the canine Diana and her master. In the meantime, Elizabeth learns that her dog Lisa was canine Diana's mother, and sues Prince for title of his dog's ownership.

At last, Prince wins the case for keeping the canine Diana, on the grounds of his boundless love towards his dog, while the actress Diana learns the lesson that fame is not everything, and even a dog can outfame a human, when the time is right. In the aftermath that follows, Peter gets married, Dr. Muthu opens a hospital in his own name, and most significantly, Karthika undergoes a successful eye surgery and starts a new life with her guardian angel Prince.

== Cast ==
- Dileep as Prince, a dog trainer at his friend Dr. Muthu's veterinary clinic and owner of the Canine Diana
- Keerthy Suresh as Karthika (Karthu), a blind lady and the owner of Toby and who becomes the Prince's girlfriend and later on his wife
- Honey Rose as Diana (Sarasamma), Prince's ex-girlfriend and Lady superstar in the film industry
  - Nandana Varma as Young Sarasamma aka Diana
- Kalabhavan Shajon as Dr. Muthu, a veterinary doctor and Prince's friend
- Aju Varghese as Peter, an aspiring filmmaker and Prince's and Muthu's friend
- Vijayaraghavan as Chackochan, Prince's father
- Rafi as Director Ravishankar (Paambu Ravi)
- Abu Salim as Circle Inspector Pramod
- Mohan Jose as Nicholas, Diana's father
- Ranjini as Elizabeth
- Suraj Venjaramoodu as Adv. Shravan, Prince's lawyer
- Guinness Pakru as Sathyavel (Bachan Kunju), Muthu's father
- Sai Kumar as Paul, Elizabeth's husband (guest appearance)
- Kalabhavan Haneef as Narayanan
- Anand as Raju, Mini's husband
- Saju Kodiyan as Ajay, Production controller
- Neena Kurup as Mini, Karthika's sister and Raju's wife
- Nisha Sarang as Nandini, Sathyavel's wife
- Indulekha as Interviewer
- Ancy as Lady at the animal hospital
- Shiju as Kishore Kumar
- Dinesh Panikker as Interviewer
- Chembil Ashokan as Isaac, Petcare Driver
- Molly Kannamaly as Paruvamma
- Eloor George as George
- Basil as Diana's bodyguard
- Chali Pala as Chacko
- Sadiq as Sudeep Menon, Cultural Minister
- Mafia Sasi as Venu, Stunt Master
- Kollam Thulasi as Opponent Leader
- Chelakulam Rahman as Hotel Staff
- Janardhanan as Chief Minister Ayyappan Kurup
- Sajitha Betti as Nandini, Wife of Kishore Kumar
- Lakshmipriya as Advocate
- Manjusha Sajish as Nurse
- Balachandran Chullikad as Justice Sathyanathan Pillai
- Anil Murali as Adv. Anil Xavier
- Narayanankutty as Doctor
- Augustina Aju as Peter's wife (Cameo)
- Vasanthi as junior artist

== Production ==
In September 2013 it was reported that Dileep's next comedy film would be Ring Master and that it would be the inaugural venture of Rafi as an independent director after separating from Rafi-Mecartin duo. Dileep was chosen to play the lead role of an animal trainer in the film. He underwent a special training for the same and was trained by animal experts from across the country. Miya was initially cast for one of the lead female role (which was actually done by Keerthy), but she dropped out of the project due to date clashes with her debut Tamil film and was later replaced by Keerthi Suresh. Keerthi essayed the role of a visually challenged girl in the film. Honey Rose was signed for another lead female role and she stated "My character Diana has negative shades but she is an interesting character".

== Soundtrack ==
The film's Music Director by Gopi Sunder. Lyrics by Nadirsha and Hari Narayanan

Ring Master (2014)

Soundtrack album by Gopi Sunder
- Released: 12 April 2014
- Genre: Film soundtrack
- Length: 14:22
- Language: Malayalam
- Label: Manorama Music

No.	Title	Lyrics	Singer(s)	Length
1.	"Kannimasam"	Nadirsha	Vijay Yesudas, Jassie Gift, Nadirsha, Gopi Sundar, Sayanora Philip	4:12
2.	"Dayana"	Hari Narayanan	Shankar Mahadevan	5:42
3.	"Aaro Aaro Chare"	Hari Narayanan	Najim Arshad	4:28
Total length:				14:22

== Box office ==
Ring Master was a commercial success. In Kerala, the film earned a distributor's share around ₹6 – 7 crore in 50 days run. The film collected US$15,159 from UK box office.
