= Nandankanan =

Nandankanan may refer to:

- Nandankanan, Chittagong, an area in the city of Chittagong, Bangladesh
- Nandankanan Zoological Park, in Bhubaneswar, Orissa, India

== See also ==
- Nandan (disambiguation)
