= Adhanur, Thanjavur =

Adhanur
- village
- Interactive map of Adhanur
- Coordinates: 10.383871°N 79.812865°E
- Country: India
- State: Tamil Nadu
- District: Nagapattinam

Languages
  - Official: Tamil
- Time zone: UTC+5:30 (IST)
- Website: www.vedaraniam.com

Adhanur is a village in the Vedaranyam taluk of Nagapattinam district, Tamil Nadu, India.

== Demographics ==
As per the 2001 census, Achampatti had a total population of 2587 with 1327 males and 1260 females. The sex ratio was 950. The literacy rate was 64.53.
