= Anandathandavapuram =

- village
- Panchavadeeswarar temple, Anandathandavapuram

- Location in Tamil Nadu, India Anandathandavapuram (India)
- Coordinates: 11°8′48″N 79°39′44″E
- Country: India
- State: Tamil Nadu
- District: Nagapattinam

Population (2005)
  - Total: 5,000

Languages
  - Official: Tamil
- Time zone: UTC+5:30 (IST)
- Postal code: 609103

Anandathandavapuram, formerly known as Kancharu Tamil pronunciation: [Kañcāṟu], is a village located in Mayiladuthurai taluk of Mayiladuthurai district, Tamil Nadu. The nearest town, Mayiladuthurai is located five kilometers, southerly. Anandathandavapuram has a small railway station which is located within the limits of the village. From this village there are direct trains to Chennai, Tiruchirapalli, Thanjavur, Chidambaram, Vaitheeswaran Temple etc.

The village is famous for Panchavateeswarar Shiva Temple

== Etymology ==
Ananda thandavam means Dance of Bliss. Anandathandavapuram is also known as Anathandapuram.

== History ==
During the 8th century CE, the village was known as Kancharu.

During the reign of Kulothunga Chola I (1070 to 1122 CE), a Chola military commander, Vattarāyan (Mudikondān), is described as a native of this place in the Kaveri delta region. He served as one of the commanders under Kulothunga Chola I and is credited in inscriptions with a military victory in the region of present-day Bengaluru.

Manakkancara Nayanar, a Nayanar saint traditionally dated to the 8th century CE, is born in Kancharu. He is generally listed as the twelfth among the 63 Nayanars.

== Demographics ==
As per the 2001 census, Anandathandavapuram had a population of 3560 with 1796 males and 1764 females. The sex ratio was 982 and the literacy rate, 76.4.

== Facilities ==
Apart from the temples and the Railway Station they have a POST OFFICE, GOVT SCHOOL, PHARMACY with DOCTOR Consultation and GROCERIES shop at Anna statue street

== Famous personalities ==
The Carnatic composer and lyricist Sri Gopalakrishna Bharathi lived in this village for most of his life. His music Guru - Sri Govinda Yati also lived here. As a tribute to this man, a music festival in the name of Gopala Krishna Bharathi is conducted in this village annually when renowned musicians from all over the country like Sudha Raghunathan, Sanjay Subramanian come to this village and take part in performances on Sri Gopala Krishna Bharathi's creations. The famous theatre artist Bombay Gnanam also grew up here.
