= Michaelpatty Raja =

2021 Indian Tamil-language neo-noir action thriller film by Francis S

- Theatrical release poster
- Directed by: Francis S
- Written by: Francis S
- Produced by: Nikesh Ram
- Starring: Nikesh Ram; Perlene Bhesania; Rajendran
- Cinematography: Manoj Pillai
- Edited by: Raja Mohammad
- Music by: Sudeep Palanad
- Production company: Spellbound Films Inc
- Distributed by: Spellbound Films Inc
- Release date: 19 March 2021
- Country: India
- Language: Tamil

Michaelpatty Raja is a 2021 Indian Tamil-language comedy-drama film written and directed by Francis S and produced by Spellbound Films Inc. The film features Nikesh Ram and Perlene Bhesania in the lead roles, with Rajendran, Kovai Sarala and Thambi Ramaiah in supporting roles. The film had a theatrical release on 19 March 2021.

== Plot ==
Raja is forced to travel to Dubai to work as a driver, after being sent out from his village by his father due to irresponsible behavior. When Raja arrives in Dubai, he realizes that he cannot drive in Dubai without having a valid driving license from Dubai. He was informed by his agent that he could drive in Dubai with his Indian driving license.

After coming to know that he was cheated, he starts working in camel farm. He saves money and takes a Dubai driving license in due course. He gets a job with an Arab family, where everyone speaks Arabic or English, which he finds difficult. One midnight, a female ghost appears in his room, and starts to speak in Tamil.

== Cast ==
- Nikesh Ram as Raja
- Perlene Bhesania
- Rajendran as Naidu
- Thambi Ramaiah as a black magician
- Kovai Sarala as Raja's mother
- Ravi Mariya as Raja's brother-in-law
- Kausalya
- R. Sundarrajan as Raja's father
- Adv. Dr. Kriss Venugopal as Arab

== Production ==
The film was first reported in early 2017 under the title of Arabu Thaaku, with Francis announced as the debut director and Nikesh Ram as the lead actor. The film was partially inspired by real events which had taken place in 2012. The title was later changed to Michaelpatty Rasavum Dubai Rosavum before Michaelpatty Raja was finalised.

In April 2017, the producers announced that Turkish actress Bergüzar Korel would play the lead role in the film, but she eventually did not feature. She was later replaced by Indian actress Perlene Bhesania. The film was predominantly shot in Dubai, with a number of Arabic and Pakistani actors based in Dubai also starring in the film.

== Release and reception ==
The film had a theatrical release across Tamil Nadu on 19 March 2021.

A reviewer from the newspaper Maalaimalar gave the film a mixed review. A reviewer from the news portal Ara Murasu noted that the film was "fun".
