= Nidur, Mayiladuthurai =

Nidur Needur or Tiruneedur
- Villiage
- Location in Tamil Nadu, India
- Coordinates: 11.135033°N 79.645044°E
- Country: India
- State: Tamil Nadu
- District: Mayiladuthurai

Population (2011)
  - Total: 5,488

Languages
  - Official: Tamil
- Time zone: UTC+5:30 (IST)
- PIN: 609 203
- Telephone code: 91 4364
- Vehicle registration: TN-82

Nidur, also known as Needur and Tiruneedur, is a village in Mayiladuthurai taluk of Mayiladuthurai district, Tamil Nadu, India. It is situated on the northern bank of the Kaveri River, approximately 5 km (3.1 mi) from Mayiladuthurai.

== Demographics ==
As of the 2011 India census, Nidur had a population of 5,488, comprising 2,588 males and 2,900 females. There were 1,266 households in the village. Children aged 0–6 years numbered 630, comprising 298 males and 332 females. Nidur had a literacy rate of 90.76%, with male literacy at 94.54% and female literacy at 87.38%. Of the total population, 1,797 people were workers, including 1,344 main workers and 453 marginal workers.

== Etymology ==
According to tradition, the name Nidur derives from the place's eternal character.

== History ==
Nidur is an ancient village on the northern bank of the Kaveri River. Somanathaswami Temple located in Nidur, is one of the shrines sung by the Shiva saint Sundarar and is traditionally associated with the birthplace of Nayanmar saint Munaiyaduvar. The temple houses a notable bronze group of idol depicting Shiva, Uma and Skanda, regarded as an example of late Chola bronze workmanship.

Two inscriptions of the Chola period, dated to the reign of Kulottunga I (1070–1119 CE), and Rajaraja III (1232 CE), are preserved in the temple. These records state that a local chief, Kandan Madavan, rebuilt the temple in stone and constructed its vimana and records local administrative decisions respectively. The inscriptions are also notable for their reference to the Jain scholar Amudasagara and his prosodic treatise Yapparungalakkarigai, providing important evidence for dating the work to the late 11th or early 12th century CE.

In the modern days, Nidur is part of Mayiladuthurai taluk in Mayiladuthurai district, Tamil Nadu.

== See also ==
- Thiruneedur Somanathaswami Temple
