= Athithi (2014 film) =

2014 Indian film by Bharathan

- Poster
- Directed by: Bharathan
- Written by: Bharathan
- Produced by: KP Ramakrishnan Nair
- Starring: Nandha; Nikesh Ram; Ananya
- Cinematography: S Jai
- Edited by: Praveen K. L.
- Music by: Bharadwaj (songs); Ratheesh Vegha (score)
- Production company: Spellbound Films
- Release date: 27 June 2014
- Country: India
- Language: Tamil

Athithi (transl. Guest) is a 2014 Indian Tamil-language thriller film written and directed by Bharathan and starring Nandha, Nikesh Ram, and Ananya, while Yuvina Parthavi, Varsha Ashwathi, Thambi Ramaiah, and Sendrayan play pivotal roles. The film is a remake of the 2010 Malayalam film Cocktail (2010), which itself is a remake of the 2007 Canadian film Butterfly on a Wheel. The film was released on 27 June 2014.

== Plot ==
Madhiazhagan is a successful project manager at a leading property promoters' firm. He is happily wedded to Vasuki, and they have a five-year-old daughter named Pavi. A posh house, a heftily paying job, a highly appreciative and supportive boss, and a happy family - Madhi's life is a far-fetched dream to most people in this era. However, all changes one day, when a man requests to be dropped en route, as Madhi and Vasu set out on a pleasant weekend. The mysterious stranger pulls out a pistol and begins to threaten the couple to bend to his wishes, holding Pavi as a hostage. The day starts with the stranger forcing the couple to draw out all the money Madhi has to the last penny and then setting it all on fire. Next, he makes Madhi lose his career by leaking the top secrets of his company, which were entrusted to him, to their competitor. The day goes on with more gimmicks by the stranger, while the couple is cornered into doing it all for their daughter's life. For the same reason, they also refrain from filing a complaint with the police, even though they are tantalizingly close to their target. While this seems endless, how they figure a way out of the mess, with a completely unexpected twist in the end, forms the rest of the story.

== Cast ==
- Nandha as Madhiazhagan
- Nikesh Ram as Saravanan
- Ananya as Vasuki
- Yuvina Parthavi as Pavi
- Varsha Ashwathi as Lakshmi
- Thambi Ramaiah as Ondipuli
- Sendrayan as Poonai Kumar
- Soundararaja as Shiva
- Kaajal Pasupathi as Marikozhundhu
- Anjali Devi as Dr. Nirmala
- Sampath Ram as Sudalai
- Jayamani as Panchamirtham
- V.V. Prasanna
- Rachana Maurya as item number

== Production ==
The film was announced in September 2013 when Spellbound Films Inc revealed they had signed on Ananya and contracted with Bharathan to make the film. Initially, actor Seenu who was, until now, seen in small roles, and Nikesh Ram, were touted to play the two heroes. However, before production began, Nandha replaced Seenu in one of the leading roles. The film began shoot in November 2013. This film is Bharathan's second directorial after Azhagiya Thamizh Magan (2007).

== Soundtrack ==
Athithi

Soundtrack album by Bharadwaj
- Released: 11 June 2014
- Recorded: 2014
- Genre: Soundtrack
- Length: 25:48
- Label: Saregama
- Producer: Bharadwaj

Bharadwaj chronology
Nandhi (2011)	Athithi (2014)	Aranmanai (2014)

All music is composed by Bharadwaj.

Track-List
No.	Title	Lyrics	Singer(s)	Length
1.	"Shutter Moodum Neerathile" (Tamil Beats)	K. Santha Mohan	Mukesh, M. L. R. Karthikeyan	4:25
2.	"Solla Solla Ullamengum"	Na. Muthukumar	V. Prasanna, Shweta Mohan	6:07
3.	"Jaipuril Jaipuril"	Pa. Vijay	L. R. Eswari	5:46
4.	"Oru Vidai Theiryamal"	Pa. Vijay	Ananthanarayanan	5:05
5.	"Shutter Moodum Neerathile" (Club Mix)	K. Santha Mohan	Mukesh, M. L. R. Karthikeyan	4:25
Total length:				25:48

== Critical reception ==
The Hindu wrote, "It's a solid backbone for a thriller – except that Athithi, after a while, abandons this angle and drifts into a more personal zone. The bigger problem with Athithi is that the writing is all over the place." The Times of India gave it 2 stars out of 5 and said "This is a solid line for an edge-of-the-seat thriller but Bharathan resorts to formulaic filmmaking – unwarranted songs and a comedy track featuring Thambi Ramaiah that kills tension like bucketfuls of water dousing a minor fire; The whiplash editing tries to whip up some tension but it only feels desperate and overdone". Silverscreen.in summarized its review with "Athithi had a thrilling premise– a normal man playing a high-stakes game of hide-and-seek with a brooding stranger, but it is marred by poor execution and apathetic performances from the cast." Indiaglitz was more positive in its assessment, saying the movie was "worth investing your time in". Deccan Chronicle gave 2.5 stars and wrote, "The movie moves at its own pace with inconsistent narration, but it has its thrilling moments as well", calling it "Above Average".
