= Azhagiya Tamil Magan =

2007 film directed by Bharathan

- Theatrical release poster
- Directed by: Bharathan
- Screenplay by: Bharathan
- Story by: S. K. Jeeva
- Produced by: Swargachitra Appachan
- Starring: Vijay; Shriya Saran; Namitha
- Cinematography: Balasubramaniem
- Edited by: Anthony
- Music by: A. R. Rahman
- Production company: Swargachitra Films
- Distributed by: Pyramid Saimira
- Release date: 8 November 2007
- Running time: 178 minutes
- Country: India
- Language: Tamil

Azhagiya Tamil Magan (transl. Beautiful Tamil son) (Note: Spelt as Azhagiya Tamilmagan on the title card.) is a 2007 Indian Tamil-language action thriller film written and directed by Bharathan (in his directorial debut) and produced by Swargachitra Appachan. The film stars Vijay in dual roles (for the first time) as Guru, a business student, and Prasad, a debaucherous hustler, alongside Shriya Saran and Namitha. The music was composed by A. R. Rahman. The plot follows a man with an ability to predict future, who foresees tragic events, including an attempted murder of his lover by his look-alike.

Azhagiya Tamil Magan released worldwide on 8 November 2007 by Pyramid Saimira. Upon release, the film received mixed reviews from critics and was a moderate success at the box office. The film was one of the top ten Asian films at the Malaysian box office in 2007. In 2021, the film had a limited re-release in Kerala. It was re-released to a wider audience on 22 March 2024.

== Plot ==
Gurumoorthy, aka Guru, is an athlete and MBA student. Abhinaya is the daughter of a business baron. They meet and fall in love.

The lovers manage to get the permission of their parents. Meanwhile, Guru visualises some bizarre scenes inside his mind. The scenes are disturbing, and worse, they become true in real life.

A psychiatrist confirms that it is extrasensory perception power and says that the images visualised by the Guru would happen sooner or later. Unfortunately, Guru visualises another scene where he stabs Abi in the stomach. Sensing that he poses a danger to his sweetheart, he runs away from her to Mumbai.

In Mumbai, he stumbles upon a person who looks like himself. This gives him a different meaning of the horrible incident visualised by him. Before catching the man, Guru gets into an accident. In the meantime, the new man moves to Chennai.

Prasad, a look-alike of Guru, is a hustler and a debauchee. He meets Dhanalakshmi during his travel to Chennai. He has sex with her and escapes. Abinaya mistakes him for Guru and brings him to her house. Sensing his opportunity, Prasad decides to act as Guru and intends to marry the rich Abhi.

The real Guru comes back and tells everyone the truth. But no one is ready to believe him, as he is outplayed by the wicked Prasad at each and every move. Finally, the truth prevails, but not before a tense battle between the two. During the battle, when Guru tries to kill Prasad, he accidentally stabs Abhi. Guru tries to take Abhi to the hospital, but Prasad knocks him out and changes into Guru's clothes so he will look like Guru in front of Abhi. Abhi recovers at the hospital and thinks Prasad is Guru again. At the hospital, she tells him how much she hates Prasad and how much she loves Guru. When Prasad hears this, he feels guilty, realises all his mistakes done and tells her he is not a Guru. Guru suddenly comes into the room, and Prasad leaves as a reformed man, after apologising to them.

As Prasad walks away from the hospital, Dhanalakshmi appears saying she is pregnant and its twins. Prasad and Dhanalakshmi join, while Guru and Abinaya get married.

== Cast ==
- Vijay in a dual role as
  - Gurumoorthy / Guru, an MBA student
  - Prasad, Guru's look-alike and a debaucherous hustler
- Shriya Saran as Abhinaya, Guru's love interest
- Namitha as Dhanalakshmi, Prasad's love interest
- Geetha as Muthulakshmi, Guru's mother
- Ashish Vidyarthi as Anand Chellaiah, Abhi's father
- Sayaji Shinde as Settu, a corrupt jeweller and Prasad's sidekick
- Tanikella Bharani as Kathiravan, Guru's father
- Sriman as Shakthi, an athlete
- M. S. Bhaskar as Guru's coach
- Santhanam as Murugesan aka Muruga
- Sathyan as Gopi, Guru's friend
- Ganja Karuppu as Kathiravan's assistant
- Karate Raja as runner in competition
- Manobala as Train Travelling Ticket Examiner
- Bombay Gnanam as Renuka's Tamil teacher
- Baby Niveditha as Renuka
- Chaams as a train passenger travelling from Bombay to Chennai
- Raviraj as Mumbai doctor
- Kadhal Saravanan as Guruvayur Gopalakrishna
- Shakeela as herself (special appearance)

Uncredited

- Kripa as Shwetha, Abhinaya's friend and Shakthi's sister
- Mu. Metha as himself
- Hema as a bus passenger
- Appukutty as a priest
- Hello Kandasamy

== Production ==
When producer Swargachitra Appachan approached Vijay for the film, Vijay said that he would sign the film if the producer convinces A. R. Rahman to compose music for the film. Subsequently, Appachan who had known Rahman earlier from the latter's days as a keyboard programmer, brought him on board and the project was on. The film marked the directorial debut of Bharathan, who assisted Dharani. He previously worked with Vijay in Ghilli (2004) as dialogue writer. Vijay played dual roles in the film for the first time in his career.

Filming began in early 2007, and ended late that September.

== Music ==
Azhagiya Tamil Magan

Soundtrack album by A. R. Rahman
- Released: 1 October 2007
- Recorded: 2007–2008 Panchathan Record Inn and AM Studios
- Genre: Feature film soundtrack
- Label: Star Music
- Producer: A. R. Rahman

A. R. Rahman chronology
Sivaji: The Boss (2007)	Azhagiya Tamil Magan (2007)	Elizabeth: The Golden Age (2008)

The soundtrack was composed by A. R. Rahman, marking his second collaboration with Vijay after 2004's Udhaya. "Ponmagal Vandaal" is a remix of the song of the same name from Sorgam (1970).

Song	Singers	Lyricist	Length
"Ellappugazhum"	A. R. Rahman	Vaali	5:31
"Ponmagal Vandaal"	Mohammed Aslam, Ember Phoenix	Alangudi Somu	3:05
"Nee Marilyn Monroe"	Benny Dayal, Ujjayinee Roy	Na. Muthukumar	6:14
"Valayapatti Thavile"	Naresh Iyer, Ujjayinee Roy, Srimathumitha	Na. Muthukumar	5:44
"Kelamal Kaiyile"	Sriram Parthasarathy, Saindhavi	Thamarai	5:27
"Maduraikku Pogathadee"	Benny Dayal, Archith, Darshana KT, Saindhavi	Pa. Vijay	5:23

== Release ==
Azhagiya Tamil Magan was released on 8 November 2007, coinciding with Diwali, and distributed worldwide by Pyramid Saimira. The film was distributed by Ayngaran International in the UK.

== Reception ==
=== Box office ===
The film grossed a total of $1,043,064 from Malaysia, the United Kingdom, and South Africa. The film was ranked sixth in the top ten Asian films at the Malaysian box office that year. Sify labelled the film as an "above average" grosser at the Indian box office.

During the film's re-release in 2024, Dinamani recalled that the film was a moderate success back in the days.

=== Critical response ===
The film generally received mixed reviews. Sify stated, "The highlight here is that there are 2 Vijays – the good guy and the bad guy. Director Barathan has tried out a new format, where both the hero and the villain entertain the audiences with howlarious moments, that brings the house up. Vijay makes it work and believable as he melds an effortfully from casual song froid to utter seriousness. His terrific comic timing, his ability to mock and lampoon makes his performance absolutely hits a bulls eye. In the negative character Prasad’s role, he is the veritable scene stealer. He has dubbed impressively modulating his voice for both the characters, and the way he dances in the introductory title song is amazing. No two ways about it, Vijay is the heart and soul of ATM". Ananda Vikatan rated the film 40 out of 100.

Kalki wrote from the interval, makers are spinning the yarn. The screenplay is weak and predictable and concluded if the pressure given in first half is repeated in second half, this Tamil son would have came beautifully. Malini Mannath of Chennai Online wrote "Azhagiya... is an enthusiastic attempt by a debutant maker to showcase his hero in a totally different mould. But with Vijay's preferring to play it safe, and his reluctance to go the whole hog, the film is at most a stepping stone for such projects in future".

=== Accolades ===
Year	Award category	Winner
2008	Filmfare Award for Best Choreography – South	Prem Rakshith (Won for the song "Ellappugazhum")
2008	Vijay Award for Entertainer of the Year	Vijay
