= Manakanchara Nayanar =

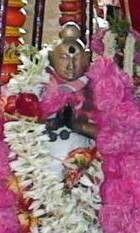

Personal life
- Born: 8th century CE Kancharur presently Anandathandavapuram, Mayiladuthurai district
- Honors: Nayanar saint,

Religious life
- Religion: Hinduism
- Philosophy: Shaivism, Bhakti

Manakanchara Nayanar, also known as Manakkanychaara Nayanar, Manakkancharar, Manakanjara Nayanar, Mankkanjara Nayanar and Manakkanjarar, was a Nayanar saint, venerated in the Hindu sect of Shaivism. He is generally counted as the twelfth in the list of 63 Nayanars. Like other Nayanars, he was a fervent devotee of the god Shiva. Manakanchara Nayanar is dated to the 8th century and was a contemporary of Eyarkon Kalikkama Nayanar, a Nayanar saint and his son-in-law as well as Sundarar. He is described to have cut his daughter's hair and given it to Shiva disguised as a Shaiva ascetic, on her wedding day.

== Life ==
The life of Manakanchara Nayanar is described in the Periya Puranam by Sekkizhar (12th century), which is a hagiography of the 63 Nayanars. Manakanchara Nayanar is dated to the 8th century and was a contemporary of Eyarkon Kalikkama Nayanar, a Nayanar saint and his son-in-law as well as Sundarar, one of the most prominent Nayanars.

Manakanchara Nayanar was born in Kancharu a fertile place in the Chola kingdom. Kancharu, presently known as Anandathandavapuram, is located in Mayiladuthurai district in the Indian state of Tamil Nadu. He was a Vellalar, a caste of agricultural land owners. He was a great devotee of Shiva, the patron god of Shaivism. He was the commander-in-chief of the Chola army. Manakanchara became a powerful and wealthy commander. He served devotees of Shiva and generously donated gifts to them.

However, Manakanchara did not have a child. He prayed to Shiva for a child and was blessed with a daughter. He distributed many gifts to devotees, while celebrating the birth of his daughter with great pomp. The daughter is called Punniya Vardhini. She was instilled with values of devotion to Shiva by her father from childhood. She grew up to become a beautiful maiden, with long and beautiful locks of hair. The family elders arranged her marriage to Eyarkon Kalikkama Nayanar, who was a Vellalar commander-in-chief of the Chola kingdom. The prospective groom also shared the devotion and love for Shiva with Manakanchara Nayanar. It was said that Manakanchara Nayanar had gained two boons from Shiva: a pious daughter as well as a devout and illustrious son-in-law.

On day of the wedding (in some versions, a day prior to the wedding), while the bridegroom was on the way to the marriage venue at Manakanchara Nayanar's house, Shiva disguised himself as a Mahavrata Shaiva yogi (an ascetic who has kept a great vow), with sacred ash smeared over his body, matted hair and wearing garlands of bones and skulls and a yagnopavita (sacred thread worn across the chest) made of human hair called a panchavati. Manakanchara Nayanar welcomed and honoured the ascetic. The ascetic enquired about the festivities and in response, Manakanchara Nayanar informed him of his daughter's wedding. When she arrived and sought the blessings of the ascetic, he commented that her long hair would have been ideal for making his panchavati. Without giving it a second thought, taking the statement as a command by the yogi, Manakanchara Nayanar chopped off the hair of his daughter and gifted them to the ascetic, in an act of supreme devotion to Shiva's devotees. Cutting of the hair of a young maiden - especially of a bride - is considered inauspicious and thus a taboo. The daughter of Manakanchara Nayanar had lost her hair, the reason of her beauty, and faced the risk of rejection by the bridegroom. The ascetic disappeared immediately, as soon as he accepted the hair. Shiva along with his consort Parvati gave a divine vision to the family of Manakanchara Nayanar, pleased with their service. The divine couple blessed the family and disappeared.

The bride's beautiful hair were also restored. Eyarkon Kalikkama Nayanar and his wedding party arrived at the place and got to know what had happened. Kalikkama regretted that he missed an opportunity to see his patron god Shiva. He felt that if he had married the bride when Shiva asked for the hair, he would have had the honour of gifting Shiva.

== Remembrance ==
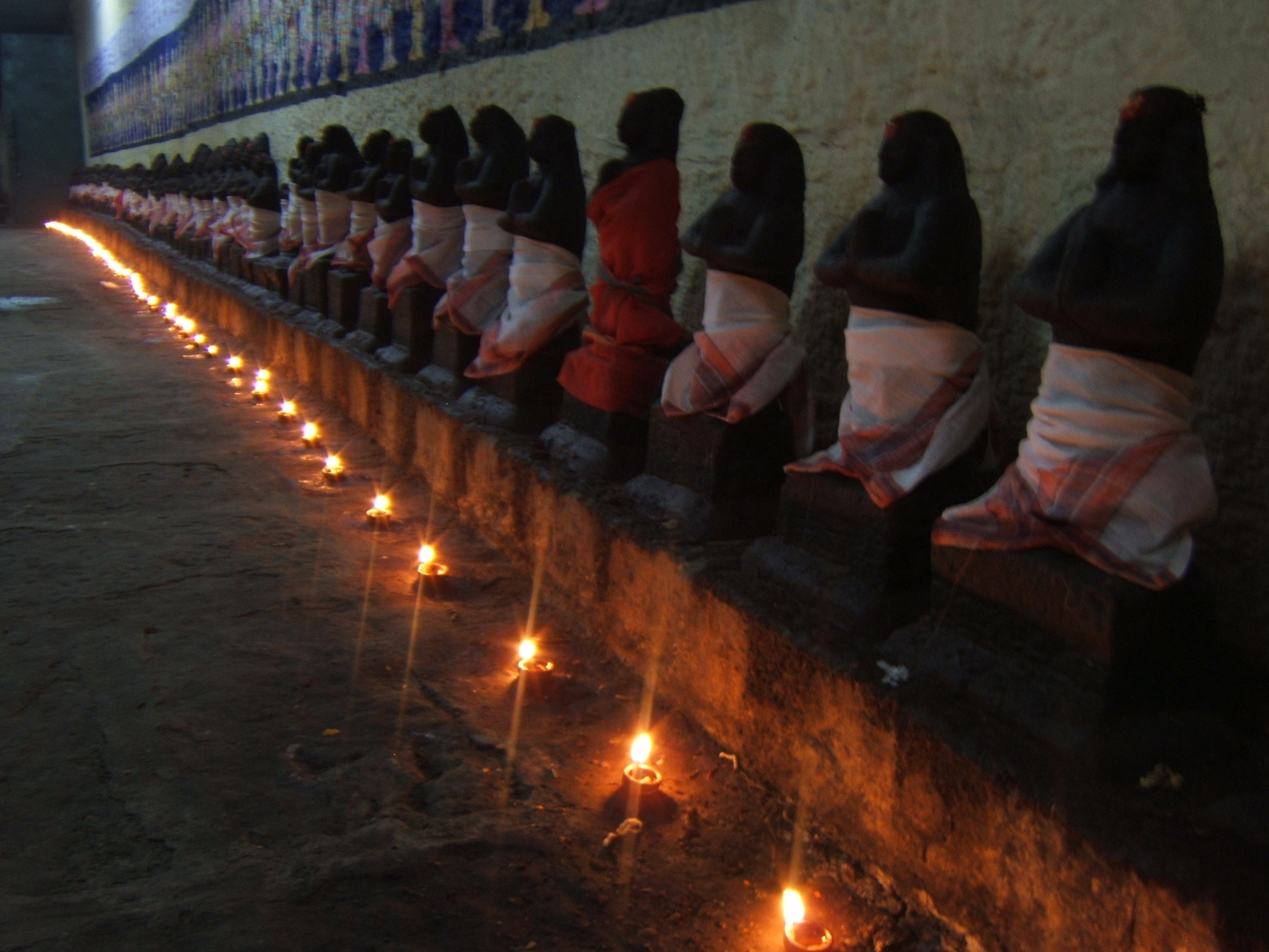
The images of the Nayanars are found in many Shiva temples in Tamil Nadu.

Sundarar venerates Manakanchara Nayanar (called Manakkancaran) in the Tiruthonda Thogai, a hymn to Nayanar saints. He is described as generous and having hill like shoulders. The temple of Sri Panchavateeswarar temple, dedicated to Shiva, marks the vision of Shiva to Manakanchara Nayanar. It is located Anandathandavapuram, Nagapattinam district, Tamil Nadu. An image of Shiva called Jata Nathar (the Lord of the hair) depicts Shiva with a lock of hair - alluding to the hair of Manakanchara Nayanar's daughter - in his hands.

Manakanchara Nayanar is worshipped in the Tamil month of Margazhi, when the moon enters the Svati nakshatra (lunar mansion). He is depicted with folded hands (see Anjali mudra). He receives collective worship as part of the 63 Nayanars. Their icons and brief accounts of his deeds are found in many Shiva temples in Tamil Nadu. Their images are taken out in procession in festivals.
