= Eyarkon Kalikkama Nayanar =

Eyarkon Kalikkama Nayanar, also known as Kalikkamanar, Kalikamba Nayanar, was a King of Haihaya (Eyar), Commander-in-chief of the Chola army, a Nayanar saint, venerated in the Hindu sect of Shaivism. He is generally counted as the 29th in the list of 63 Nayanars.

== Life ==
The life of Eyarkon Kalikkama Nayanar is described in the Periya Puranam by Sekkizhar (12th century), which is a hagiography of the 63 Nayanars. He is dated to the 8th century and was a contemporary of Sundarar, one of the most prominent Nayanar saints.

Kalikkama was born in Thiruperumangalam (also rendered Tiruperumangalam or Tirupperumangakalam), Ponni Nadu (region of the river Kaveri). He was a Vellalar by birth, a great devotee of Shiva, the patron god of Shaivism. He was born in the family of Eyars. His title "Eyarkon" means "king of Eyars" or "chief of Eyars". The Eyars traditionally served the Chola kings and Kalikkama was the commander-in-chief of the reigning Chola ruler. He served Shiva at the temple in Thirupungur (Thiruppunkur).

The chapter devoted to him in the Periya Puranam tells the following account. Sundarar had asked Thyagaraja, the presiding form of Shiva at Thyagaraja_Temple of Thiruvarur to go his wife Paravaiyar disguised as a messenger. Kalikkama thought it blasphemy to use Shiva as a servant and rebuked Sundarar (the servant) who made Shiva (the Master) a slave. Thyagaraja wanted both his devotees to be reconciled. He afflicted Kalikkama with colic pain in his stomach. The god appeared in Kalikkama's dream and informed him that only Sundarar could heal him. Similarly, he ordered Sundarar to visit Kalikkama in Thirupungur and cure him. Sundarar sent a message to Kalikkama about his arrival and set off to Thirupungur. Kalikkama chose to die instead of being cured by the "blasphemer" Sunadarar. He pierced his stomach by his sword and cut his bowels out, giving up his life. While his wife readied to kill herself, she heard about Sundarar's arrival and thought it was her duty to serve a devotee of Shiva. She hid her husband's corpse and welcomed Sundarar. Mindful of her husband's wishes, she ordered her people to inform Sundarar that Kalikkama was resting inside and did not need Sundarar's healing. However, the persistent Sundarar finally managed to see Kalikkama, who was lying in a pool of blood. Sundarar blamed himself for Kalikkama's suicide and decided to follow suit. As Sundarar was about to cut his throat, Kalikkama was resurrected by Shiva and stopped Sundarar. Sundarar prostrated before Kalikkama and begged his forgiveness. They hugged together and settled their differences. Sunadarar sang a panegyric in honour of the form of Shiva worshipped at Thirupungur as well as Kalikkama. The saints worshipped Thyagaraja in Thiruvarur together for some days, after which Kalikkama returned to Thirupungur. He spent rest of life serving Shiva at Thirupungur and finally reached Kailash, Shiva's abode after death.

Kalikkama was the husband of the daughter of Manakanchara Nayanar, a Nayanar saint as well as Vellalar commander-in-chief of the Cholas. He appears in the account about his father-in-law in the Periya Puranam. Kalikkama's wife is sometimes called Punniya Vardhini; she is not named in the Periya Puranam. On the day of their wedding, Shiva came disguised as a Shaiva ascetic and asked for the hair of the bride, before Kalikkama arrived. Unmindful of the possibility that the bridegroom may not accept a bald bride, Manakanchara Nayanar cut off her hair and gave it to the ascetic. Shiva revealed his divine form and blessed the family. The bride's looks were also restored. Kalikkama and his wedding party arrived at the place and got to know what had happened. Kalikkama regretted that he missed to see his patron god Shiva. He felt that if he would have married to the bride when Shiva asked for the hair, he would have had the honour of gifting Shiva.

== Remembrance ==
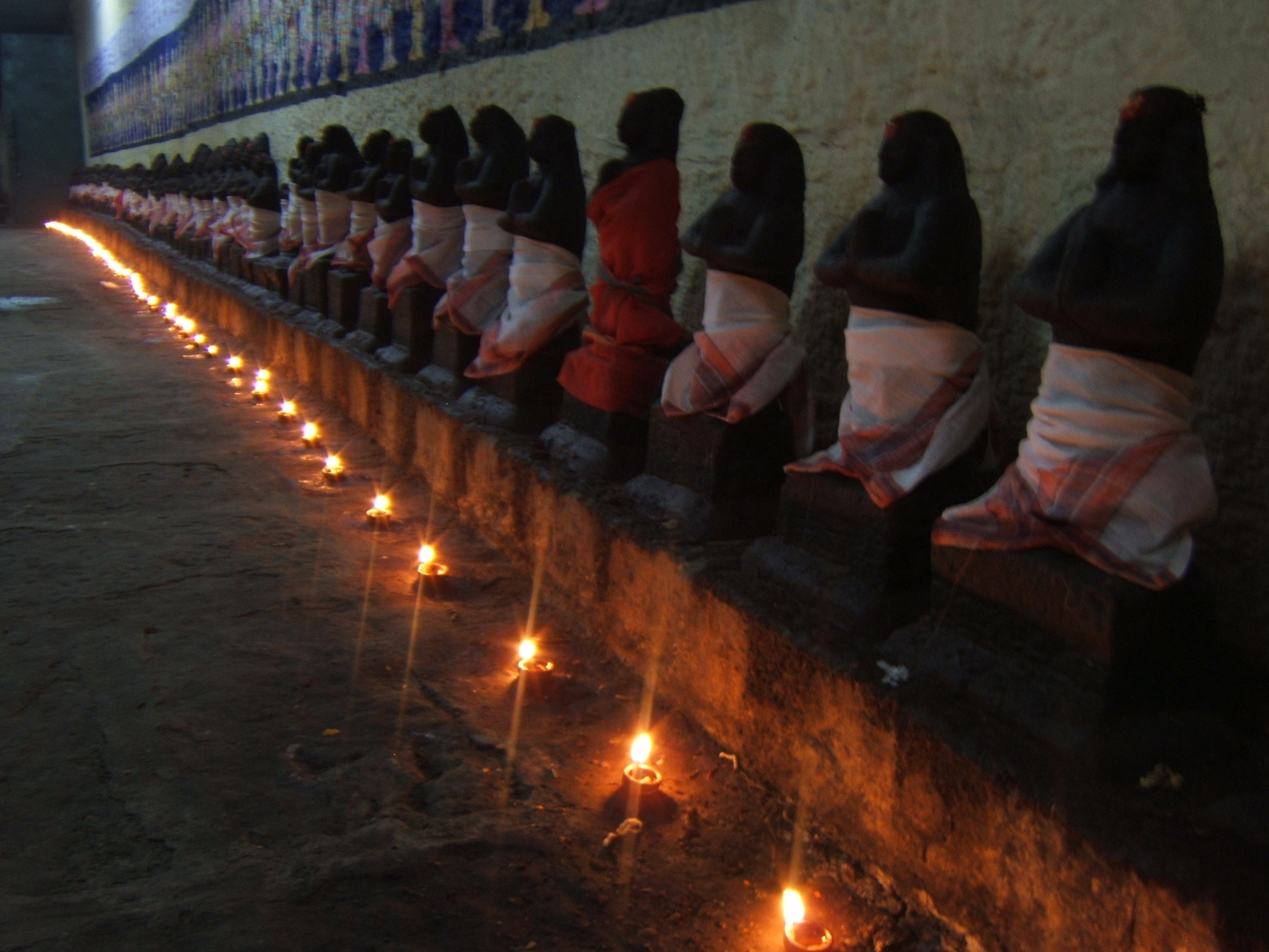
The images of the Nayanars are found in many Shiva temples in Tamil Nadu.

Sundarar venerates Eyarkon Kalikkama Nayanar (called Kalikkaman, the prince of Eyars) in the Tiruthonda Thogai, a hymn to Nayanar saints. An earlier hymn to Shiva recalls Eyarkon Kalikkama, who owned twelve velis (a unit of measure) of land and was cured of disease by Shiva, where Shiva had said to bring showers to the twelve velis of land in drought.

Eyarkon Kalikkama Nayanar is worshipped in the Tamil month of Aani, when the moon enters the Revati nakshatra (lunar mansion). He is depicted wearing a crown, with folded hands (see Anjali mudra) and sometimes with a sword in the crook of his arm. He receives collective worship as part of the 63 Nayanars. Their icons and brief accounts of his deeds are found in many Shiva temples in Tamil Nadu. Their images are taken out in procession in festivals.
