= Vaanku (film) =

2021 Malayalam film

- Directed by: Kavya Prakash
- Screenplay by: Shabna Mohammed
- Story by: Unni R.
- Produced by: Sirajudheen KP; Shabeer Pathan
- Starring: Anaswara Rajan; Nandhana Varma; Meenakshi Unnikrishnan; Gopika Ramesh
- Cinematography: Arjun Ravi
- Edited by: Suresh Urs
- Music by: Ouseppachan
- Production companies: Shimoga Creations; 7 J Films; Trends Ad Film Makers
- Release date: 29 January 2021
- Running time: 108 minutes
- Country: India
- Language: Malayalam

Vaanku (transl. Adhan) is an Indian Malayalam-language drama film directed by Kavya Prakash based on the 2018 short story of the same name by Unni R. Produced by Shimoga Creations, 7 J Films, and Trends Ad Film Makers, in association with Unni R., the film stars Anaswara Rajan, Nandhana Varma, Meenakshi Unnikrishnan and Gopika Ramesh in the lead roles. The story revolves around Rasiya, a college-going girl who desires to sing aloud Adhan, the Islamic summons to prayer. It also features Vineeth, Joy Mathew, Thesni Khan, Srikant Murali and Prakash Bare in supporting roles. The screenplay was written by Shabna Mohammed, and Ouseppachan composed the soundtrack. Arjun Ravi served as the cinematographer. Development of the film began in September 2018 and principal photography took place in June 2019.

== Plot ==
In the central plot Raziya, a young Muslim college girl, who is free-spirited and is in last year of her graduation, inspired by her college teacher to fulfill one's own wish or dream; aspires to sing aloud Adhan, the Islamic summons to prayer, and faces the difficult social challenge while achieving her goal. A flash back scene refers to soothing effect of Adhan on her during one of her early childhood crying episodes. The movie portrays Raziya's desire to recite Adhan as her deeply Sufi spiritual connect with the God and not as an act of rebellion or challenge to her community. When one of the Raziya's friend discusses her wish on social media, unaware spirituality in her desire, family, relatives and community around reacts angrily with her. Raziya gets some supportive voices too in form of her mother and grand mother.

According to Shabna the movie talks about gender discrimination, space and choices.

Raziya has a middle class Muslim family background from Kerala, her mother Jazmi is moderate, while her father Razak is religious conservative. Movie begins with peripheral plot where in the last year of their graduation girls are inspired by their teacher to fulfill one of their own wish before graduating. Raziya and her friends Deepthi, Jyothi and Shameena come across challenge of their own wishes their discourse and situation creates some funny moments and partially help to keep movie light hearted. As part of humor, plot weaves a story of one of Raziya's friend who seeks a particular boy friend for the reason he can adjust with sub-par food of college canteen and managing his food habits in married life will be easy but in reality the guy turns out to be a gay. In another instance another friend of Raziya fulfills her wish of hugging a senior male lecturer since because his personality reminds her of her father.

The original story 'Vaanku' about possibilities of a Muslim woman giving call to prayer was conceptualized by Unni R. in between 1995 and 1997 when he used to stay near Masjid-i Jahān-Numā mosque at Palayalam in Thiruvananthapuram. In Unni's story it unfolds in Kottayam where as in the movie it is depicted to unfold in Ponnani in Malappuram district.

== Cast ==
- Anaswara Rajan as Raziya
- Nandhana Varma as Jyothi, Raziya's friend
- Meenakshi Unnikrishnan as Deepa, Raziya's friend
- Gopika Ramesh as Shameena, Raziya's friend
- Vineeth as Razak, Raziya's father
- Shabna Mohammed as Jazmi, Raziya's mother
- Deepa Kartha as Deepa Pradeep, Raziya's teacher
- Sarasa Balussery as Raziya's grand mother and Razak's mother
- Joy Mathew
- Thesni Khan as Zulfi
- Srikant Murali
- Prakash Bare

== Critical reception ==
According to Anna MM Vetticad, while film Vaanku's emphasis on evolution from within the Muslim society is important, the movie fails to do justice to its subject at hand specially when compared to other contemporary Malayalam feminism related films like The Great Indian Kitchen, Biriyaani and not even to standard of Unni R's story based earlier movie Ozhivudivasathe Kali.

Vetticad wonders about why and how come the director in Kavya Prakash who thoughtfully renders replayed title song tracks fails in rest of the movie. Vetticad appreciates lyrics by P.S. Rafeeque for depiction of oneness of human kind from the song track.

“La Ilaaha Illallaha, Allahu Akbar (There is no God except Allah, Allah is the greatest)... Who are you? You are me. I am you. I am the soil. I am the rain. I am the sunshine. You are the morning. I am the fire,” ~ P.S. Rafeeque in Vaanku

Vetticad maintains that, the movie Vaanku fails to navigate complex nuances of feminism Vs. faith debate; lacks in depth about explaining why a rights cautious lead character of the movie remains immersed in religion in spite of religion remaining vehicle of patriarchy and failing her.

Vetticad says that, while Shabna Mohammed the script writer pulls off lead character's mother's and father's role well enough, lead character's role soon wears off in scanty script and average performance of inexperienced actors fail to give expected justice to their roles.

According to Sify's critic Moviebuss, in the subplot of the movie wishes/ dreams of 3 of Raziya's friends only partially succeed to create funny and light touch to the plot and at places end up bringing awkward moment for the audience, specially a dialogue in a feminism related movie creatively controlled by women shown to be delivered by female lecturer where in character says "..Will I hear next that some girl raped the principal?..” seems unexpected and awkward.

According to Sajin Shrijith, movie intends put forward case for gender representation. Shrijith maintains that Vaanku is a reasonably bold film with positive intention, but it lacks necessary clarity. According to Kerala's one of the civil society activist Jazla Madasseri, any social reform would face ten times madness in real life situations than that is depicted in the movie Vaanku.

Deepa Soman in Times of India review article, 'An unorthodox take on tradition' seem to concur with Shrijith's perception that shorter version of the film would have sufficed. Soman maintains that some of good reads in the text did not match cinematic media, movie editing did not come to her expectation, but unlike other critics Soman is okay with Director Kavya Prakash's grip over Unni R's story. Soman says though at times presentation of Raziya looks theatrical and on and off assertive and silently submissive role of Raziya does over all justice to the given character. Soman points out positive aspects of the movie Vaanku where in social problem of a previously progressive minds submitting themselves to radical ideas, early marriages adversely affecting women education and in turn increased dependence on patriarchy and religion supported sexism have been well captured in the movie. Soman maintains that the movie Vaanku encourages dialogue against sexism within families in a society where challenging existing religious taboos is not a cakewalk.

== Release ==
The film was planned to release on 13 March 2020 but now postponed due to the coronavirus outbreak. It finally released on 29 January 2021.

== See also ==
- Islam in Kerala
- Islamic Bill of Rights for Women in the Mosque
- Islamic feminism
- Islamic Modernism
- Kerala reformation movement
- Kithaab
- Liberalism and progressivism within Islam
- Malayalam literature
- Religion in Kerala
- Women in Islam
