= Sivalokanathar Temple, Tirupunkur =

Sivalokanathar Temple
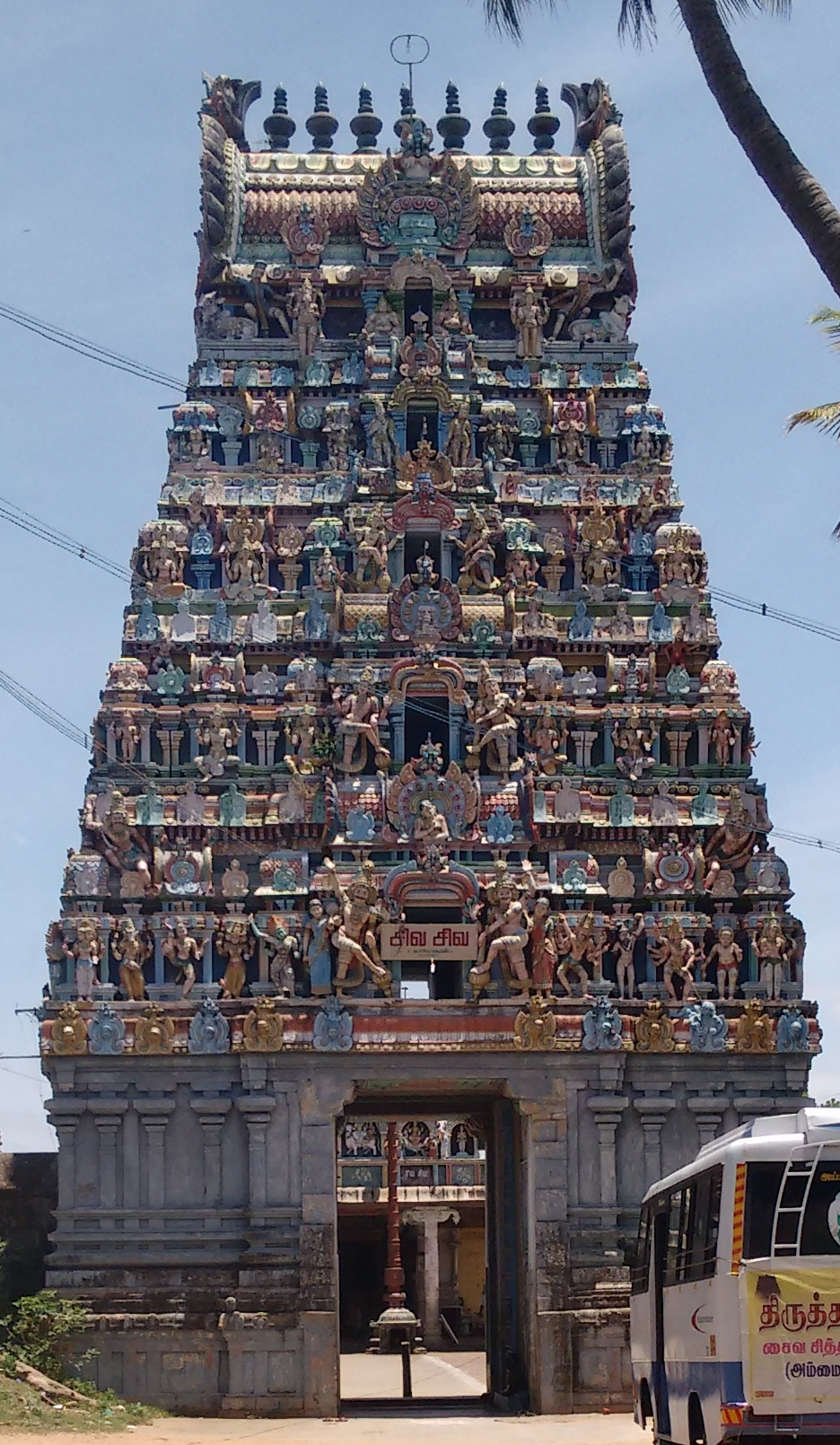

- Location in Tamil Nadu

Religion
- Affiliation: Hinduism
- District: Mayiladuthurai
- Deity: Sivalokanathar(Shiva)

Location
- Location: Tamil Nadu, India
- State: Tamil Nadu
- Country: India
- Coordinates: 11°11′18″N 79°40′34″E

Architecture
- Type: Dravidian architecture

Sivalokanathar Temple (சிவலோகநாதர் கோயில்) is a Hindu temple in the Indian state of Tamil Nadu. It is dedicated to the god Shiva. The temple is situated in the village of Tirupunkur or Thirupunkur which lies about 3 miles west of Vaitheeswaran Koil. The temple is associated with the legend of the Saivite saint Nandanar who was one of the 63 Nayanmars. While being a Dalit, Nandanar was not allowed inside the temple, the idol of Nandi within the temple precincts moved a few inches at the command of Shiva so as not to obstruct Nandanar's view from the gate of the shrine.

== Literary mention ==
Tirunavukkarasar describes the feature of the deity of Tirupunkur and Thiruneedur
