= Sreeya Remesh =

Indian actor

- Born: Haripad, Kerala, India
- Occupation: Actress
- Years active: 2000–present

Sreeya Remesh, also known as Sreekutty Ramesh, is an Indian actress who predominantly works in Malayalam cinema and television shows. Sreeya ramesh working in Telugu serial ammoru chaamanthi etc

== Early life and education ==
Sreeya was born to Ramachandran Pillai and Ratnamma Ramachandran. She married Remesh Nair and has two children Adraja Remesh and Adrith Remesh. She completed her secondary education from Our Own English High School – Sharjah. After that, she went to Sanatana Dharma College – Alapuzha for further studies.

After her B.com there she was married and settled in Bahrain with her husband, there she had done many dramas, add films, comparing, anchoring and short films. From there she started her acting career in serials started with Kumkumapoovu, Sathyameva Jayathey Mayamohini and Ezhu Sundara Rathrikal. She has acted in Tamil, Telugu, Malayalam, Kannada films and TV serials.

== Career ==
Sreeya made her film debut with the family drama Ennum Eppozhum in Malayalam cinema. According to Sreeya, her role of "Dr. Usha" in the film was a turning point in her life. Her next films were Vettah, Aneezia, Oppam, Daffedar, etc..

== Filmography ==
=== Television ===
| Year | Serial | Language | Role | Channel |
|---|---|---|---|---|
| 2013 | Kumkumapoovu | Malayalam | Meera | Asianet |
| 2014 | Sathyameva Jayathey | Malayalam | Padmaja | Surya TV |
| 2015 | Ezhu Rathrikal | Malayalam | Gauri | Asianet |
| 2016 | Mayamohini | Malayalam | ACP Jancy Thomas IPS | Mazhavil Manorama |
| 2019 | Ayyappa Saranam | Malayalam | Leela/Mahishi | Amrita TV |
| 2020–2021 | Attarintiki Daredi | Telugu | Sambhavi | ETV |
| 2022- 2024 | Intinti Gruhalakshmi | Telugu | Rajya Lakshmi | Star Maa |
| 2025- present | Chamanthi | Telugu | Remadevi | Zee Telugu |

=== Films ===
| Year | Title | Role | Language | Director |
|---|---|---|---|---|
| 2015 | Ennum Eppozhum | Dr.Usha | Malayalam | Sathyan Anthikad |
| 2015 | Aneesya | Aneesya | Malayalam | Arjun Binu |
| 2016 | Vettah | HM Jeena Babu | Malayalam | Rajesh Pillai |
| 2016 | Oppam | Amina | Malayalam | Priyadarshan |
| 2016 | Daffedar | Archana | Malayalam | Johnson Esthappan |
| 2018 | Mohanlal | Sethu's sister | Malayalam | Sajid Yahiya |
| 2018 | Vikadakumaran | Leela | Malayalam | Boban Samuel |
| 2018 | Krishnam | Principal | Malayalam | Dinesh Baboo |
| 2018 | Mazhayathu | Suma | Malayalam | Suveeran |
| 2018 | Odiyan | Ravunni's sister | Malayalam | Shrikumar Menon |
| 2018 | Paviyettante Madhura Chooral | Sethulakshmi | Malayalam | Sreekrishnan |
| 2019 | Theerumanam | Deepa | Malayalam | Sajin |
| 2019 | Lucifer | TV actress | Malayalam | Prithviraj Sukumaran |
| 2019 | Krishnam | Principal | Tamil | Dinesh Baboo |
| 2022 | Thattukadayil Ninnu Cemetery Vare | Mary | Malayalam | Siraj Fantasy |
| 2022 | Kaapa | Gynecologist | Malayalam | Shaji Kailas |
| 2022 | Kasthuri Mahal | Parvathi | Kannada | Dinesh Baboo |
| 2023 | Laika | | Malayalam | |
| 2023 | Kondottipooram | | Malayalam | |
| 2024 | Jamalinte Punchiri | | Malayalam | |
| 2024 | Thankamany | Human Rights official | Malayalam | |
| TBA | Un Kadhal Irundhal | | Tamil | Hashim Marikar |
| TBA | Untitled project with Nassar | - | Tamil | |
| TBA | Ghost Rider | | Malayalam | |
