= Intinti Gruhalakshmi =

Indian Telugu television series (2020–2024)

- Promotional poster
- Genre: Drama
- Written by: Karunakar Adigarla
- Screenplay by: Giridhar Poola
- Directed by: Vijay Krishna
- Starring: Kasthuri Shankar; Harikrishna; Indraneil
- Country of origin: India
- Original language: Telugu
- No. of episodes: 1158

Production
- Producer: Malayaja Prabhakhar
- Cinematography: Subash Donthi
- Editor: Kanchi Ramakrishna
- Camera setup: Multi-camera
- Running time: 22 minutes
- Production company: Sri Sumamanohara Production Pvt Ltd

Original release
- Network: Star Maa
- Release: 3 February 2020 – 20 January 2024

Related
- Sreemoyee; Anupamaa

Intinti Gruhalakshmi (transl. Goddess of Every House) is an Indian Telugu language television drama series that aired on Star Maa. Produced by Sri Sumamanohara Production Pvt Ltd, it premiered on 3 February 2020 and concluded on 20 January 2024, completing 1158 episodes. The show is a remake of the Bengali television series Sreemoyee that was broadcast on Star Jalsha.

== Plot ==
Tulasi, a humble homemaker lacks the respect from few of her family just because she is uneducated. Her husband Nandagopal "Nandu" is romantically involved with his colleague Lasya who envies Tulasi. Tulasi wins a funfair at her daughter Divya's school and secures a job as cooking teacher but loses it due to unpunctuality caused by her family. Tulasi's elder son Abhi introduces his love interest Ankita, whose mother Gayatri opposes the marriage over Tulasi's incomplete degree and the family being joint and middle-class unlike them. However, Tulasi puts her great efforts to arrange the marriage rebukes Lasya for interfering with the family issues when she advises Nandu to break the marriage as Gayatri is arrogant. Tulasi's supportive younger son Prem stalks Sruthi for requesting her to be a singer in his band but she misunderstands him to be an eve-teaser and files a complaint against him. Clearing the misunderstandings, Tulasi gets Sruthi to join the band. Sruthi and Prem's boss Aswin lusts for her and offers a contract to Prem's band just for Sruthi. Tulasi's childhood friend Anjali returns to India for Abhi's marriage and dislikes the family's way of treating Tulasi and Nandu's more-than-enough closeness with Lasya. Anjali confides her doubts about Nandu and Lasya to Tulasi but she refuses to trust this, blinded by trust on her husband.

Though series of events, Lasya brands Tulasi as irresponsible to Nandu as the latter was all along having a soft corner for her. Furious on Tulasi due to Lasya's conspiracies, he leaves for a trip with her without informing his family about his location. After this, Divya gets abducted by a person who seeks revenge from Tulasi for helping a girl from being molested by him and exposing him. Tulasi and Anjali save Divya, who along with Abhi and Tulasi's mother-in-law Anasuya blame her for it. To cool an upset Tulasi, Anjali takes her to a trip in a resort where Nandu and Lasya stay. Upon learning about their affair, Tulasi feels excessively deceived but conceals it from her family fearing that Gayatri might break the marriage. Anjali leaves the house when Lasya and Nandu frame her but Tulasi continues to trust her. Aswin convinces Sruthi's father to arrange her marriage with him. Though Sruthi loves Prem, she accepts to marry Aswin as the latter abducts Prem and threatens to murder him. Tulasi's brother Deepak saves Prem but not before Sruthi marries Aswin. Abhi marries Ankita without Tulasi's presence as she cares for a hospitalized Prem. Eventually, Ankita realizes Tulasi's worth and treats her like a mother. Lasya dramatically enters Nandu's house with her son Lucky and Tulasi shelters her to hide about their affair from her aged parents-in-law. However, Nandu's father Parandamayya spots Nandu hugging Lasya and the family too learns of this. Unexpectedly, Anasuya favours Lasya as she is educated.

Nandu and Tulasi start procedures to get divorced and Nandu moves out of his house to Lasya's residence. Naïve about Lasya's intentions, Divya chooses to live with her father leaving Tulasi devastated. Eventually, Divya feels depressed as Lasya favours Lucky over her and outcasts her. She commits suicide and returns to Tulasi. Divya also convinces her school principal to give Tulasi another chance which she accepts and offers the job to Tulasi for a second time. Nandu and Lasya lose their jobs for having an affair in the office and Anasuya feigns a heart attack for convincing Tulasi to allow them into the household. Nandu suffers from a heart stroke and Tulasi cares for him. Nandu starts to realize his mistake while Rohith, Tulasi's childhood friend and Anjali's brother who had a crush on her returns to India as he had set up his office in Hyderabad and coincidentally meets Tulasi and offers her a job. Tulasi accepts and earns praise by representing an idea to reduce the company's losses due to plastic use in the office. Jealous, Nandu begins to hate her and accuses her of having an affair with Rohith but eventually realizes that it is not the case.

When Aswin attempts to force himself upon Sruthi, she gets separated from him and flees from her father's place when he persuades her to return to Aswin. Prem ends up arranging for her stay in his friend's house but Aswin takes her back using the loopholes of laws. This time when he tries to rape Sruthi, she hits his head hard and assumes him dead. Prem takes the blame to protect Sruthi but Tulasi manages to save him with Sruthi and Rohith exposing Aswin who was faking his death. Repenting for not understanding his daughter, Sruthi's father dies in his sleep leaving her devastated. Her house owner expects favours from Sruthi who is banished when she tries to expose this to his wife. Nowhere to live, Tulasi takes Sruthi home much to the chagrin of Nandu, Lasya, Anasuya, Ankita and Abhi. Jealous, Ankita leaves the house with Abhi upon being influenced by Gayatri. Nandu resolves to start a business while Divya becomes a medical student thanks to Tulasi. Nandu's sister Madhavi and her husband Mohan act as if the latter is leaving the former to make Nandu realize his mistake but Lasya exposes them. Misunderstanding Tulasi's involvement behind it, Nandu declares that Lasya would handle the household responsibilities and Tulasi has nothing to do with the family. Tulasi objects to it and has an emotional outburst telling that she deserves love and respect for her dedication to the family. Frustrated, Tulasi kicks Lasya out and Nandu leaves with her. Tulasi decides to operate a cottage industry of textile and Sruthi thwarts Anasuya and Lasya's attempts to stop it. Anjali returns and encourages Tulasi to live on her own terms. Prem receives an opportunity as music director for a soap opera. While at Gayatri's house, Ankita learns that she conceived but her parents suggest her to hide it from Abhi and abort it as they are not settled yet. Abhi, after perceiving that Ankita has aborted her child rebukes her and her parents and returns to Tulasi. Ankita too returns but plots to separate Abhi from his family.

Tulasi plans to celebrate 50th anniversary of Parandamayya and Anasuya and during the occasion, Lasya and Tulasi's co-sister Bhagya demean Saraswati, Tulasi's mother. Nandu and Tulasi get divorced. An aged lonely man Ramachandra requests Tulasi to be the owner of his textile industry to which she accepts, though after some resistance from Anasuya and Ankita. She wants some money to invest in the factory and Parandamayya suggests her to mortgage the house. Claiming legal right over the house, Nandu objects while Parandamayya suffers from a heart stroke due tensions in his family. Tulasi arranges money for surgery by mortgaging the house with Sasikala, a moneylender. The surgery is successful and Parandhaamaiah recovers. Nandu apologizes to his father who rejects the apology and rebukes him. In the same week, Ramachandra and Tulasi discuss the funds required to rejuvenate the factory and the lack of funding sources. Tulasi requests the garment company material supplier Mishra to supply the material without an advance and he agrees. Tulasi and her family rejoice but their happiness is short lived as Nandu meets with an accident after being depressed by his father's cold behaviour towards him. Fortunately, he sustains only minor injuries. Lasya takes advantage of this situation and plots to throw Tulasi out of the house. Anasuya supports her. Tulasi comes to Lasya's home to enquire about Nandu's well-being. But Lasya and Anasuya stop her from seeing Nandu and blame her for the accident. They demand that Tulasi take Nandu home so that he may emerge from the depression caused by leaving his family. A helpless Tulasi brings Nandu and Lasya to her home. Tulasi starts her factory as Mishra agrees to supply the material. But Nandu insults her as she is an undergraduate. A jealous Lasya joins hands with Giridhar, who wants to usurp Ramachandra's factory and establish his own business venture, to destroy Tulasi. However, Tulasi re-opens the factory by performing rituals with Nandu. However the electricity department officers cut power off due to a penalty which is actually fabricated by Giridhar. Tulasi figures the cause out, and electricity is restored.

Nandu had suffered a huge loss in his company due to unfinished work. This makes him irritated and depressed. A business magnate GK offers a huge deal to Nandu's bankrupt company, with the selfish intent of getting his daughter Akshara married to Nandu's younger son Prem. Prem however is in love with Sruthi who has not made her own mind up yet about Prem. Nandu and Lasya accept GK's deal and plan for Prem to marry Akshara and drive Sruthi out of their way. Nandu decides to marry Sruthi off to another person to get rid of her. But Prem expels the groom's family when Nandu arranges the engagement for Sruthi. Lasya provokes Nandu to blackmail Sruthi so that she won't express the feelings she has developed for Prem. On the same day Prem proposes to Sruthi in front of his family but she rejects him, succumbing to Nandu's blackmail. Nandu demands that Prem marry Akshara, and a helpless Prem agrees. Akshara and Prem prepare to marry but Tulasi learns that Sruti is being blackmailed to not express her love. Tulasi brings Sruthi to the function and at last GK and Akshara understand the situation and decide to marry Sruthi and Prem, frustrating Lasya and Nandu. Lasya demands that Tulasi pay the debt of Nandu's company which she agrees to. Finally Sruthi and Prem tie the knot. Ankita feels jealous of Sruthi and insults her while welcoming the married couple.

Sruthi and Prem decide not to consummate their marriage until they are financially secure, as they think it not fair to burden Tulsi upon who most of the family is dependent. Anasuya apologises to Tulasi after overhearing a conversation between Lasya and Bhahya about Anasuya being a burden and Lasya living in the house. Tulsi is revealed to be a victim of Ovarian cancer and is taken to a wellness centre run by Dr Advait Krishna, who befriends her. However, she does not know anything about her disease, nor does the family except Abhi and Nandu. However, the family learns the truth and begins to adore Tulasi, surprising her. Ankita too reforms and accepts Sruthi as well. She learns about her disease but decides to remain strong for the sake of the family. Ankita starts to become a caring family member. Lasya arranges her marriage in the same resort with Nandu. On the wedding day, Nandu leaves the resort, feeling suffocated, and Lasya threatens to incarcerate the family. Nandu returns to the resort and marries Lasya under compulsion. The same night, Tulasi falls unconscious after singing and is taken to hospital. A surgery is performed to save her. The family returns home and Lasya starts to torment the family, annoying Nandu. Lasya secures a job while Nandu fails to do so. Frustrated, Nandu successfully seeks work as manager of his friend's café, and receives support from the whole family except Lasya.

Meanwhile, Lasya appoints an arrogant maid Vasantha for herself and Nandu who troubles the family, especially Anasuya. Vasantha is sent out of the home but she leaves understanding Tulasi's kindness and promises to help her whenever she is in need. Abhi starts to party with his friends and is profligate, eventually becoming indebted. Unbeknownst to the family and Tulasi, Abhi mortgages Ankita's jewellery. Lasya, frustrated by Nandu's prioritizing his family over her, instigates him against Tulasi and the family. Nandu blames Tulasi for the children being irresponsible but realizes that he was wrong and he did nothing as a father, while indulging in an extra-marital affair. Tulasi starts her efforts to make her children responsible. The family sets out to celebrate Makar Sankranti. Abhi is cheated in the stock market by his friend who escapes with Abhi's money. After confronting his friend, Abhi accidentally kills his friend in a scuffle and escapes. The police torment Tulasi's family to learn Abhi's whereabouts. Tulasi eventually finds him but an abusive SI joins them and insults Tulasi by asking about her husband. Abhi fights with the SI, who feels aggravated and arrests him, but denies any arrest the next morning. After the issue is resolved, Prem demeans Lasya for insulting Tulasi and the latter asks him to leave the house with Sruthi. Ramulamma, the family maid shelters Prem while Anasuya scolds Tulasi for being harsh. Prem begins to live independently. Divya is initially angry with Tulasi but learns that she cares for Prem and wants him to be independent and free of issues created by Lasya. Nandu wants to leave the house and demands that Tulasi send his parents with him. Reluctantly, Tulasi asks Parandamayya and Anasuya to go with their son. Unwilling, they instead leave the house secretly and begin to live in an old age home. Tulasi is shattered and further breaks down when Lasya accuses her of hiding Nandu's parents. However, Lasya is slapped by an enraged Madhavi and berated by the family in return. Parandamayya and Anasuya return home after being found by Tulasi. Nandu leaves the house and rents an portion of another house to live with Lasya. For paying the loans she took for Parandamayya's surgery, Tulasi sells the house and leaves with her family to a rented house of Abhi's friend as its caretakers. Upon being emotionally blackmailed by Gayatri, Tulasi sends Abhi and Ankita with her. Prem and Sruthi, who live in a rented house struggles to make ends meet. Prem joins as an assistant for a music director who steals his lyrics for a song. When Prem protests in front of the director, he is offended and decides to give into the selfish world. He reluctantly accepts an offer to write songs for him in exchange for money. Tulasi's friend Pravalika, an IAS officer volunteers to help Tulasi's factory which is in litigation because of Lasya and Bhagya. Tulasi leaves the factory as it is being suffered due to her rivals. Upon being inspired by Pravalika, Tulasi becomes a music tutor. Pravalika is transferred to Delhi. A property of Ankita is legalized to her after a long period due to litigation. Lasya and Nandu eye the property and host Ankita's birthday party to impress her but in vain as she remains in support of Tulasi.

Tulasi overhears a conversation between Abhi, Gayatri, Nandu and Lasya when they talk that Tulasi is greedy for the property Ankita secured and she is devastated as her own son misunderstands her. She forbids Ankita from visiting her to avoid taunts from Gayatri. Ankita, however learns the truth and rebukes Abhi. Lasya schemes and influences Gayatri to the name to the property after Abhi to avoid Ankita's decision to name the property after Tulasi. However, on Tulasi's advice, Ankita's father Sharat names the property after Ankita as she learns about Lasya's conspiracies to influence Abhi to get the property. Abhi feels deceived and accuses Tulasi of being greedy for property.

Ankitha returns to Tulasi while Abhi stays with her parents. Abhi challenges Ankita that Tulasi would some day use her property and that day, he will take Ankitha away from Tulasi. Tulasi plans to apply for a loan and Bhagya leaks it to Lasya, who deceives Tulasi by bribing the broker into applying for loan with fake documents and later forging her signature to withdraw the loan amount of ₹20,00,000. Tulasi, Ankitha and Divya try to find out of the culprit for getting back their money and saving Tulasi from getting arrested as she signed on fake bank documents for being influenced. They capture the broker and blackmail Lasya to give all the money; setting a deadline of 24 hours for her. While she plans to engineer another conspiracy, Nandu learns the truth and gives the money to Tulasi. He berates Lasya for cheating his family and tries to leave her but reconciles with her when she fakes a suicide attempt. Prem needs ₹5,00,000 for sponsoring his music album and Tulasi reconciles with him, helps him win a music competition from which he wins price money to sponsor his album. The family gear up to celebrate Bonalu. Lasya tries to spoil Tulasi's "Bonam" by breaking the holy pots Divya is holding but Madhavi saves the day. Vasu and Sakshi (from Guppedantha Manasu) join Tulasi for Bonalu and help her achieve her task when Lasya gives sleeping pills to Tulasi believing that she would lose consciousness and break the Bonam.

Honey is the daughter of an extremely rich man named Samrat. When Honey meets with an accident caused by Nandu, Tulasi admits her in hospital. Nandu and Lasya leave Honey to attend an interview by Samrat that gets cancelled when he learns of Honey being missing. Misunderstanding that Tulasi abducted Honey, Samrat has Parandamayya and Anasuya apprehended and kept in jail. When Tulasi arrives, she is also jailed when she refuses to divulge that Honey wanted to tour the city and hid about her house's details from Tulasi for protecting her from Samrat's wrath.

== Cast ==
=== Main ===
- Kasthuri Shankar as Tulasi – Saraswathi's daughter; Deepak's sister; Nandu's ex-wife; Abhi, Prem and Divya's mother; Rohith, Anjali and Pravalika's best friend; Anasuya and Parandamayya's daughter-figure (2020–2024)
- Harikrishna as Nandagopal aka Nandu: Anasuya and Parandamayya's elder son; Aravind and Madhavi's brother; Lasya's husband; Tulasi's ex-husband; Abhi, Prem and Divya's father; Lucky's step-father (2020–2024)
- Prashanti as Lasya – Shekar's former wife; Nandu's second wife; Lucky's mother; Abhi, Prem and Divya's step-mother; Tulasi's arch-rival (2020–2024)

=== Recurring ===
- Nikhil Nair / Ravisankar Rathod as Prem – Tulasi and Nandu's younger son; Lasya's step-son; Abhi and Divya's brother; Akshara's ex-fiancé; Sruthi's husband (2020–2022) (2022–2024)
- Lahari Vishnuwazhala as Sruthi – Sastri's daughter; Aswin's ex-wife; Prem's wife (2020–2024)
- Chaganty Sree Harsha / Venkat Chinthalapudi as Dr. Abhiram aka Abhi – Tulasi and Nandu's elder son; Lasya's step-son; Prem and Divya's brother; Ankita's husband (2020–2021) / (2021–2024)
- Sireesha Nulu / Uttara Reddy as Dr. Ankitha – Gayathri and Sarath's daughter; Abhi's wife (2020–2024)
- Poojitha Reddy / Inchara Shetty as Dr. Divya – Tulasi and Nandu's daughter; Lasya's step-daughter; Abhi and Prem's sister; Vikram's wife (2020–2023) / (2023–2024)
- Kalyan Reddy as Vikram – Rajalakshmi's son; Divya's husband (2023–2024)
- Indraneel as Samrat – A rich businessman and Tulasi's friend; Honey's father (2022-2023)
- Preeti Nigam as Anjali – Rohith's sister; Tulasi's best friend (2020-2021)
- Babloo Prithviraj as Rohith – Anjali's brother; Tulasi's best friend and former one-sided lover (2021)
- Sithara as Pravalika IAS – Tulasi's best friend (2022)
- Sailaja / Kanaka Durga as Anasuya – Parandamayya's wife; Nandu, Aravind and Madhavi's mother; Tulasi's mother-figure; Abhi, Prem and Divya's grandmother (2020–2024)
- Perraju as Parandamayya – Anasuya's husband Nandu, Aravind and Madhavi's father; Tulasi's father-figure; Abhi, Prem and Divya's grandfather (2020–2024)
- Indira Anand as Saraswathi – Tulasi and Deepak's mother; Abhi, Prem, Divya and Kalyan's grandmother (2020-2021)
- Kamudrani Siva as Deepak – Saraswati's son; Tulasi's brother; Sravani's husband; Kalyan's father (2020-2022)
- Unknown as Sravani – Deepak's wife; Kalyan's mother (2020)
- Unknown as Kalyan – Sravani and Deepak's son; Abhi, Prem and Divya's cousin (2020)
- Sreedhar as Dr. Sarath – Gayatri's husband; Ankitha's father (2020–2024)
- Bhargavi as Dr. Gayatri – Sarath's wife; Ankitha's mother (2020–2024)
- Girish as Aravind – Anasuya and Parandamayya's younger son; Nandu and Madhavi's brother; Bhagya's husband (2020-2021)
- Swapna as Bhagya – Aravind's wife (2020–2024)
- Madhavi Latha as Madhavi – Anasuya and Parandamayya's daughter; Nandu and Aravind's sister; Mohan's wife (2020-2022)
- Avinash as Adv. Mohan – Madhavi's husband; Tulasi's brother-figure (2020-2022)
- Sumit Roy as Aswin – Sruthi's ex-husband (2020-2021)
- Advaith Kona as Lucky – Lasya and Shekar's son; Nandu's step-son (2020–2024)
- JL Srinivas as Gopala Krishna aka GK – Akshara's father; Tulasi's namesake brother and helper (2021-2022)
- Shabeena as Akshara – GK's daughter; Tulasi's daughter-figure; Prem's ex-fiancée (2021-2022)
- Prathyusha as Sasikala – Money lender (2021-2022)
- Ramani Chowdhary as Ramulamma – Tulasi's family's former maid (2020-2022)
- Pavitra as Vasantha – Lasya's former personal maid (2021)
- Sreeya Remesh as Rajalakshmi (2023)

== Adaptations ==
Language	Title	Original release	Network(s)	Last aired	Notes
Bengali	Sreemoyee শ্রীময়ী	10 June 2019	Star Jalsha	19 December 2021	Original
Kannada	Inthi Nimma Asha ಇಂತಿ ನಿಮ್ಮ ಆಶಾ	7 October 2019	Star Suvarna	8 January 2022	Remake
Marathi	Aai Kuthe Kay Karte! आई कुठे काय करते!	23 December 2019	Star Pravah	30 November 2024	Remake
Malayalam	Kudumbavilakku കുടുംബവിളക്ക്	27 January 2020	Asianet	3 August 2024	Remake
Telugu	Intinti Gruhalakshmi ఇంటింటి గృహలక్ష్మి	3 February 2020	Star Maa	20 January 2024	Remake
Hindi	Anupamaa अनुपमा	13 July 2020	StarPlus	Ongoing	Remake
Tamil	Baakiyalakshmi பாக்யலட்சுமி	27 July 2020	Star Vijay	8 August 2025	Remake
Odia	Shanti ଶାନ୍ତି	6 June 2022	Star Kiran	14 January 2023	Remake
