= Nandanar (disambiguation) =

Nandanar was a Nayanar saint in the Hindu sect of Shaivism.

Nandanar may also refer to:

- Nandanar (author) (1926–1974), pseudonym of Indian writer P. C. Gopalan
- Nandanar (1935 film) or Bhakta Nandanar, 1935 Indian film by Maniklal Dandan
- Nandanar (1942 film), a 1942 Indian film

== See also ==
- Nandan (disambiguation)
