= Nikesh Ram =

Indian businessman and actor

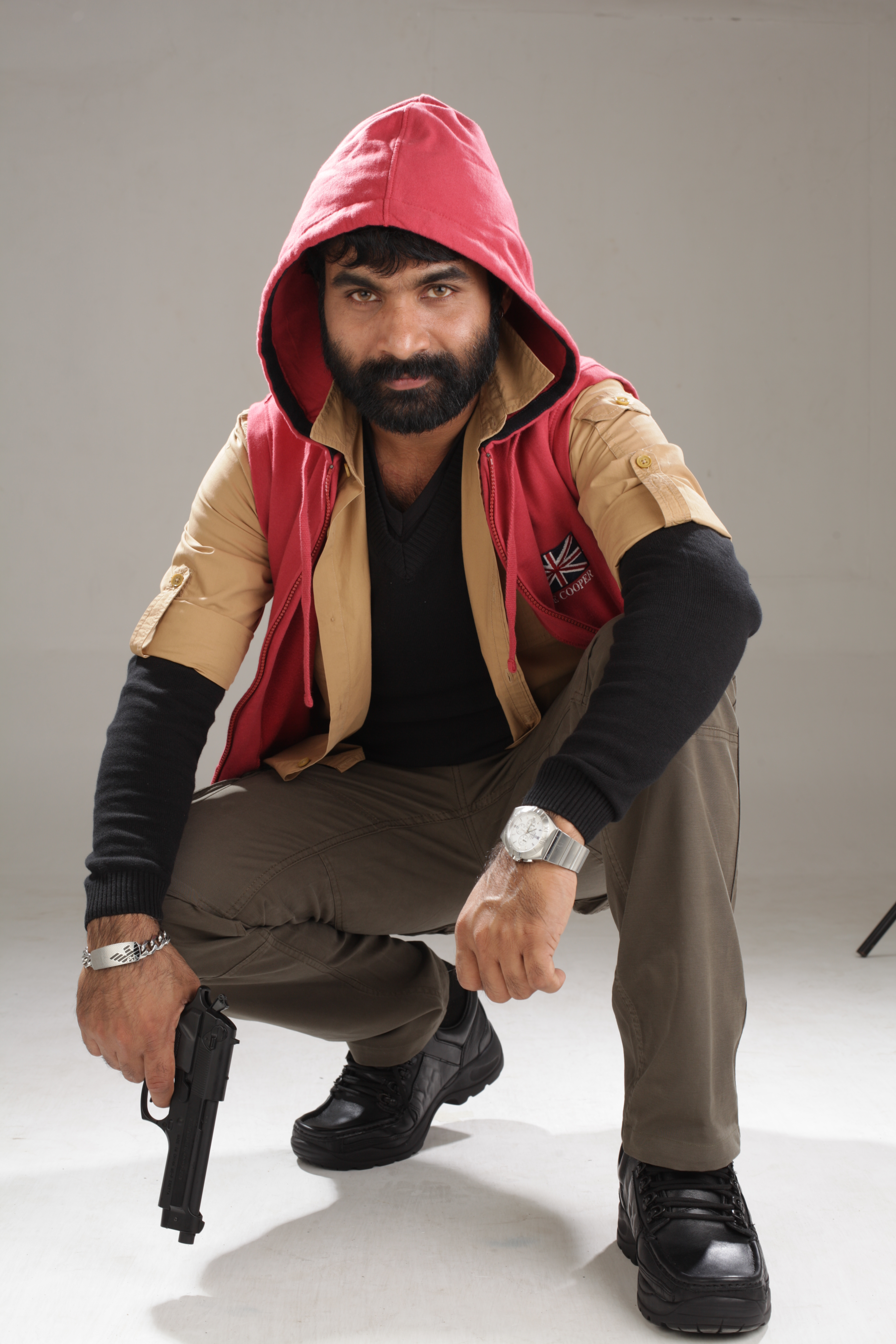
- Born: August 8, Kannur, Kerala, India
- Occupations: Actor, businessman
- Years active: 2014 – present
- Spouse: Sitara (m. 2005)
- Children: 3

Nikesh Ram is an Indian businessman and actor, who has appeared in Tamil and Malayalam language films.

== Career ==
=== Acting career ===
Ram made his acting debut through his home production, Athithi directed by Bharathan. The film received mixed reviews and performed poorly at the box office, with his performance garnering mixed reviews. Deccan Chronicle noted "Debutant Nikesh Ram with his unkempt looks fits the bill and is convincing in a negative role". Silverscreen.com's reviewers wrote that Ram "looks the part in dark shirts, chinos and thick-rimmed glasses, but is unconvincing otherwise. His lines sound contrived and forced and don't sound like someone trying to scare the daylights out of you".

Ram appeared in a cameo role in Vishnu's Velainu Vandhutta Vellaikaaran (2016) . His first Malayalam movie released in 2018 titled Mazhayathu directed by Suveeran. Ram is acting as hero in this movie along with actress Aparna Gopinath. The Times of India mentioned his acting as "Nikesh Ram puts on a decent performance as a stubborn husband and a doting dad". Mangalam News Paper said "Nikesh Ram did a good job and he could easily satisfy the role of Venugopal in the way it is required".

Ram starred in Michaelpatty Raja (2021) directed by Francis S.

=== Business career ===
During August 2021, Ram was honored by the UAE government with the UAE Golden Visa for 10 years. Ram appeared in Khaleej Times BTR Magazine Cover Page as a successful businessman in UAE in Facility Management Industry.

== Filmography ==
- All films are in Tamil, unless otherwise noted.

Year	Title	Role	Language	Notes
2014	Athithi	Saravanan	Tamil	Debut film
2016	Velainu Vandhutta Vellaikaaran	Doctor	Tamil	Cameo appearance
2018	Mazhayathu	Venugopal	Malayalam	
2021	Michaelpatty Raja	Raja	Tamil	

== Awards and nominations ==
Year	Film	Award	Category	Result	Ref.
2018	Mazhayathu	Toronto International Nollywood Film Festival TINFF Toronto Canada	Best Actor	Won	
2018	Mazhayathu	Overcome Film Festival California USA	Best Actor	Won	
2018	Mazhayathu	Asiavision Awards Dubai	Best Actor	Won	
