= Ananthathandesvarar Temple, Kanjaru =

Shiva temple in Tamil Nadu, India

Ananthathandesvarar Temple is a Siva temple in Kanjaru in Mayiladuthurai district in Tamil Nadu (India).

== Vaippu Sthalam ==
It is one of the shrines of the Vaippu Sthalams sung by Tamil Saivite Nayanar Appar.

== Presiding deity ==
The presiding deity is known as Ananthathandesvararr. The Goddess is known as Birahannayaki.

== Kanjarur ==
This place is also known as Kanjarur, Ananthathandavapuram and Anathandavapuram.
