= Achampatti =

- village
- Location in Tamil Nadu, India Achampatti (India)
- Coordinates: 10°47′5.35″N 79°8′31.3″E
- Country: India
- State: Tamil Nadu
- District: Thanjavur

Population (2001)
  - Total: 1,545

Languages
  - Official: Tamil
- Time zone: UTC+5:30 (IST)

Achampatti is a village in the Budhalur taluk of Thanjavur district, Tamil Nadu, India.

== Demographics ==
As per the 2001 census, Achampatti had a total population of 1545 with 777 males and 768 females. The sex ratio was 988. The literacy rate was 49.85.
