= Periya Negamam =

- Panchayat town
- Location in Tamil Nadu, India
- Coordinates: 10.7333°N 77.1°E
- Country: India
- State: Tamil Nadu
- District: Coimbatore

Area
  - Total: 10.88 km^{2} (4.20 sq mi)

Population (2011)
  - Total: 7,098
  - Density: 652.4/km^{2} (1,690/sq mi)

Languages
  - Official: Tamil
- Time zone: UTC+5:30 (IST)

Periya Negamam is a panchayat town in Pollachi taluk of Coimbatore district in the Indian state of Tamil Nadu. Located in the north-western part of the state, it is one of the 33 panchayat towns in the district. Spread across an area of 10.88 km^{2} (4.20 sq mi), it had a population of 7,098 individuals as per the 2011 census. The region is known for its handloom industry and the production of Negamam cotton saris.

== Geography and administration ==
Periya Negamam is located in Pollachi taluk of Coimbatore district in the Indian state of Tamil Nadu. Spread across an area of 10.88 km^{2} (4.20 sq mi), it is located in the western part of the state. It is one of the 33 panchayat towns in the district. The region has a tropical climate with hot summers and mild winters. The highest temperatures are recorded in April and May, with lowest recordings in December-January.

The town panchayat is headed by a chairperson, who is elected by the members, who are chosen through direct elections. The town forms part of the Pollachi Assembly constituency that elects its member to the Tamil Nadu legislative assembly and the Pollachi Lok Sabha constituency that elects its member to the Parliament of India.

== Demographics ==
As per the 2011 census, Periya Negamam had a population of 7,098 individuals across 2,101 households. The population saw a marginal decrease compared to the previous census in 2001 when 7,683 inhabitants were registered. The population consisted of 3,546 males and 3,552 females. About 522 individuals were below the age of six years. The entire population is classified as urban. The town has an average literacy rate of 79.3%. About 20.9% of the population belonged to scheduled castes.

About 51% of the eligible population were employed full-time. Handloom industry contributes significantly to the economy, with the town known for its weaving of Negamam cotton saris. Hinduism was the majority religion which was followed by 97.6% of the population, with Christianity (1.4%) and Islam (1.0%) being minor religions.
