= Nandanam (disambiguation) =

Nandanam is a neighborhood of Chennai, India.

Nandanam may also refer to:

- Nandanam (film), a 2002 Indian film by Ranjith
- Nandanam metro station, of the Chennai Metro in Nandanam
- Nandanam, Bhongir mandal, a village in Telangana, India

== See also ==
- Nandan (disambiguation)
