= Business student =

Business student usually refers to a person who is pursuing or has obtained a university degree in business studies. Graduates obtain degree in Business Administration typically with a major in general management, finance, accounting, marketing or strategy. Students graduating with such a degree frequently start their careers in the business world. Students may get business degrees at an undergraduate, graduate, or doctorate level.

The US education systems awards bachelor's degrees after four years of university, which can be followed by the post graduate Master of Business Administration degree. The European system, after the Bologna process, recognizes the 3 years Bachelor degrees, which can be followed by the Master of Science/Arts degrees, after which one can obtain a post graduate Master of Business Administration degree.

== Types ==
Students can get business degrees at an undergraduate, graduate, or doctorate level. At an Undergraduate level, degrees are usually in management, finance, accounting, marketing, or strategy. Other degrees, such as supply chain management, operations, management information systems, and economics are also sometimes conspired business degrees. At a graduate level, students can earn a master's degree in Business Administration.

== Demographics ==
Business students are the most common students at schools, with roughly 20% of all undergraduate degrees in the U.S. being business degrees. Business students are primarily male, with breakdowns in 2011 of 56.4%(male)-43.6%(female) at the undergraduate level. At all levels of study, white students are the most common, followed by Hispanic, Black, and American Indian Students. Business students are primarily found in the United States, although programs are offered across the globe.

Students who major in Business Administration can expect a starting salary in the ballpark of $43,500, and a mid-career salary around $71,00. Those students who chose to study a specific business degree can generally expect higher salaries, for example:

- Finance — $49,200
- Supply Chain Management — $52,000
- Account — $45,300
- Marketing Management — $42,100

A study done in 2002 on business students in the United States revealed that the average family income for business students are as follows:

- < $25,000: 19.7% of students
- $25,001-$50,000: 29.7% of students
- $50,001-$75,000: 20.4% of students
- $75,001-$100,000: 16.4% of students
- > $100,000: 13.8% of students
