= Nandhana Varma =

Indian actress

- Born: Kochi, Kerala, India
- Other name: Baby Nandhana
- Occupation: Actress
- Years active: 2012–present

Nandana Varma is an Indian actress who predominantly appears in Malayalam cinema.

== Film career ==
Nandana made her movie debut through a minor role in Spirit. Then she went on to act minor supporting roles in Ayalum Njanum Thammil, Crocodile Love Story, 1983, Ring Master, Life of Josutty and Mili. She came to fame through her portrayal of Aamina in Guppy. She later appeared on notable roles in Paulettante Veedu, Aakashamittayee, Mazhayathu and cameo appearances in Sunday Holiday, Mohabbathin Kunjabdulla and Anjaam Pathiraa. She made her Tamil debut through a supporting role in Rajavukku Check. She played the parallel lead role in Anaswara Rajan starer Vaanku.

== Filmography ==
- All films and series are in Malayalam language unless otherwise noted.

=== Films ===
Year	Title	Role	Notes	Ref.
2012	Spirit	Pankajam's daughter		
2012	Ayalum Njanum Thammil	Purushothaman's Daughter		
2013	Crocodile Love Story	Young Nithya		
2013	Rebecca Uthup Kizhakkemala	Young Rebecca Uthup		
2013	Ms Lekha Tharoor Kaanunnathu	Young Lekha Tharoor		
2013	Ente Puthiya Number			
2014	1983	Young Manjula Sasidharan		
2014	Ring Master	Young Diana		
2015	Life of Josutty	Young Jessy		
2015	Mili	Young Mili		
2016	Guppy	Aamina		
2016	Paulettante Veedu	Young Sneha		
2017	Aakashamittayee	Saira Bhanu		
2017	Sunday Holiday	Unni's daughter		
2018	Mazhayathu	Sreelakshmi		
2018	Enn Kaadhal	Lover	Musical video	
2019	Mohabbathin Kunjabdulla	Kunjabdulla's childhood love		
2020	Anjaam Pathiraa	Young Rebecca Louis		
2020	Rajavukku Check	Daughter of Raja Senthoor Pandian	Tamil film	
2021	Vaanku	Jyothi		
2021	Bhramam	Prabha	OTT release Amazon Prime	
2023	Laika	Parthana	Malayalam cinema	

=== Web series ===
Key
†	Denotes television productions that have not yet been released

Year	Title	Role	Platform	Ref.
2026	Cousins and Kalyanams †	TBA	JioHotstar	
