= Thiruneedur Somanathaswami Temple =

Thiruneedur Somanathaswami Temple

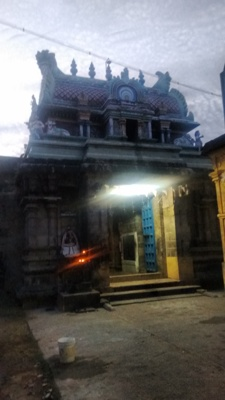
The entrance of the temple

Thiruneedur Somanathaswami Temple (திருநீடூர் அருட்சோமநாதர் கோயில்) is a Hindu temple located at Needur in Mayiladuthurai district of Tamil Nadu, India. The historical name of the place is Sapthapuri. The presiding deity is Shiva. He is called as Somanathaswami. His consort is known as Veyurutholi Ammai.

== Sthala Puranam ==
The Sthala Puranam of this temple says that a demon Manmasudhan who was born as cancer(Nandu in Tamil) due to his sins, requested Sage Narada for advice to get relief.

== Significance ==
It is one of the shrines of the 275 Paadal Petra Sthalams - Shiva Sthalams glorified in the early medieval Tevaram poems by Tamil Saivite Nayanars Tirunavukkarasar and Sundarar.

== Literary mention ==
Tirunavukkarasar describes the feature of the deity of Tirupunkur and Thiruneedur as:

கையெலாம் நெய்பாயக் கழுத்தே கிட்டக் கால்நிமிர்த்து நின்றுண்ணுங் கையர் சொன்ன

பொய்யெலாம் மெய்யென்று கருதிப் புக்குப் புள்ளுவரா லகப்படா துய்யப் போந்தேன்
செய்யலலெஞ் செழுங்கமலப் பழன வேலித் திருப்புன்கூர் மேவிய சிவலோ கனை

நெய்தல்வாய்ப் புனற்படப்பை நீடூ ரானை நீதனேன் என்னேநான் நினையாவாறே.
