= Arunaa Nandhini =

M.A. in Tamil, worked as a Tamil Lecturer in Karnataka and now a Tamil Novelist

Rajeshwari Vaidyanathan is a Tamil novelist who writes in the pen-name Arunaa Nandhini She was born into a family where her father, too was a novelist. Her 1st short story Madhumati was published in the magazine Devi and her 1st novel was Nazhai Vaanilla published in Rani Muthu. She has written nearly 50 short stories that have been published in Amuthasurabi, Mangai Malar, Rani, Devi, Savi, and Nandhini. She has been awarded the Kurunovel Award by 'Kalai Magal and the Mini Thodar Award by the publisher Devi. One of her short stories was accepted and included in the Singapore Syllabus during the 1990s.

Arunaa Nandhini's novels are published by Arunodhayam and Arivalayam Publications. Her novels cover family subjects, romance, reality, with some humor added for the readers to enjoy at their leisure.

One of her daughters in law is Chandana Brijesh

Arunaa Nandhini's novels:

1. Paatha Nyabagam Illayo
2. Sollathan Ninaikiren
3. Uyril Kalandha Uyirey
4. Envasam Nanillai
5. Vaarayo Vennillavey.
