= Nandana Millagala =

Sri Lankan politician

Hon. Nandana Millagala MP
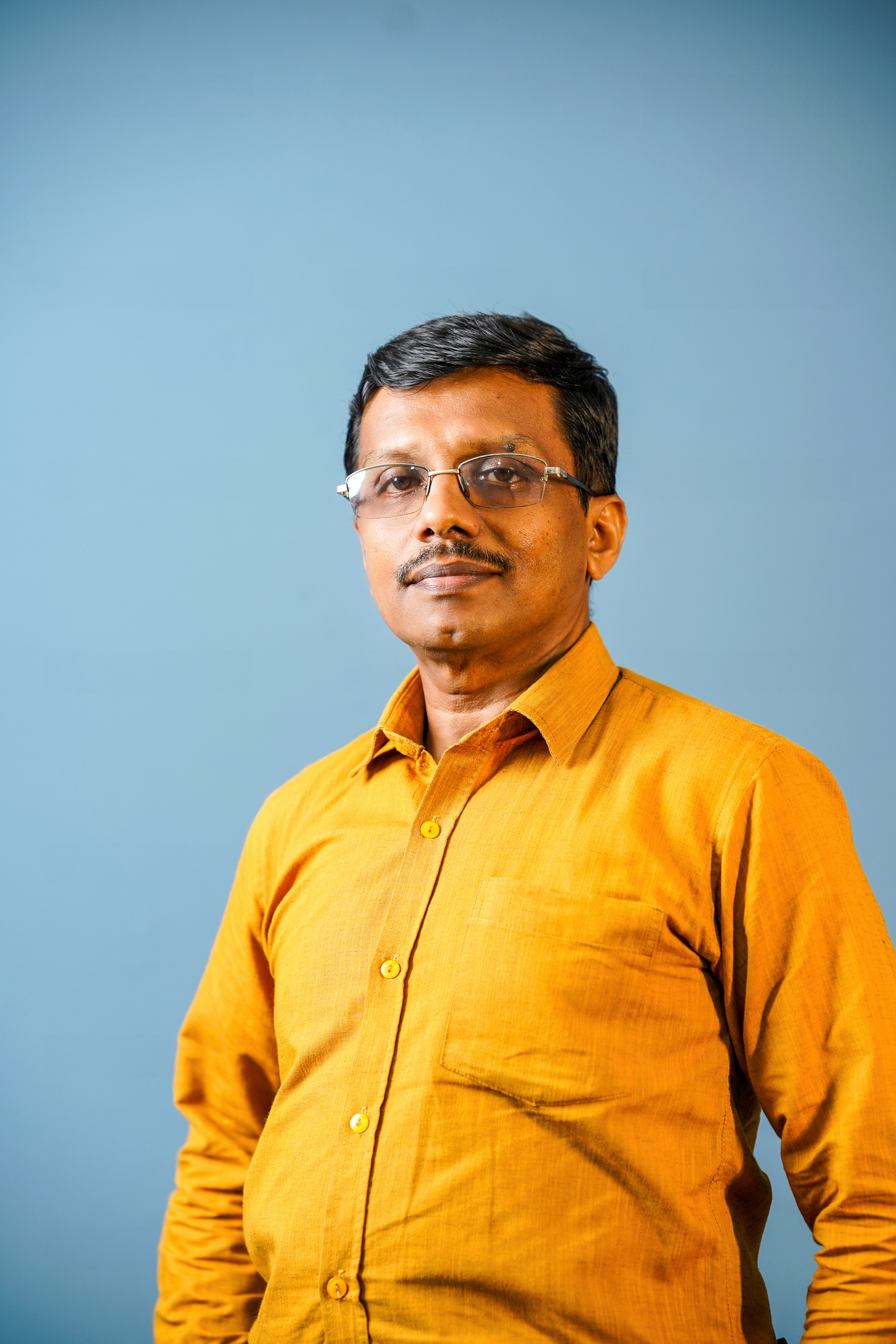

Member of Parliament for Kegalle Electoral District
- Incumbent
- Assumed office 15 November 2024

Personal details
- Party: National People's Power
- Spouse: Dilhani Millagala
- Children: Kavindu Millagala, Malindu Millagala, Sajani Millagala, Harindu Millagala
- Profession: Politician

Nandana Millagala is a Sri Lankan politician. He was elected to the Sri Lankan Parliament from Kegalle Electoral District as a member of the National People's Power Dr. Nandana Millagala, also known as M.W.N.U. Gunasinghe, is a Sri Lankan politician, academic, author, and media researcher. Born on August 6, 1969, in Yatiyantota, Kegalle District, he has made significant contributions in both academia and politics.

== Early life and education ==
Millagala completed his primary education at Abhayaraja Maha Vidyalaya in Berannawa and his secondary education at Sri Pragnodaya Pirivena in Elagala. He pursued higher education at the University of Kelaniya, earning a Bachelor of Arts (Honors) in mass communication, a Master of Philosophy (M.Phil.), and a Doctor of Philosophy (Ph.D.) in mass communication.

== Academic career ==
Millagala served as a senior lecturer in mass communication at Rajarata University of Sri Lanka. He also held the position of head of the Department of Humanities within the Faculty of Social Sciences and Humanities at the same university. His academic work includes research in neuromarketing and its impact on marketing communication strategies.

== Literary contributions ==
As a renowned author, literary scholar, and lyricist, Millagala has made notable contributions to Sri Lankan literature and music. His works are available on platforms such as Amazon Music and Spotify, where he is recognized for compositions like "Apata Puthe Ratak Athe."

== Political career ==
Millagala has been active in Kegalle District and national politics since 1994. He is a member of the National People's Power (NPP) party and was elected to the Sri Lankan Parliament representing the Kegalle Electoral District in November 2024. Within the NPP, he serves as a Kegalle district executive member and is also involved with the National Intellectuals Organization as a Kegalle District executive member. Throughout his political career, Millagala has contributed to various national policy-making committees.

== Community involvement ==
Millagala has been actively involved in social welfare organizations. He served as the secretary of Tirasara Mehewara and the Sabaragamuwa Social Development Foundation. Additionally, he was the chairman of the Godapola-Wattarama SANASA organization. His commitment to community service extends to his role as a peace judge.

== Online presence ==
Millagala maintains an online presence through social media platforms. His Facebook profile indicates his academic affiliation with Rajarata University and his residence in Godapola, Sri Lanka. Dr. Nandana Millagala's multifaceted career reflects his dedication to education, literature, politics, and community development in Sri Lanka.
