= Kaithapram Damodaran Namboothiri discography and filmography =

Malayalam lyricist, poet, music director

This is the discography of Kaithapram Damodaran Namboothiri.

| Year | Movie | Song |
|---|---|---|
| 1986 | Ennennum Kannettante | Devadundhubhi |
| 1986 | Ennennum Kannettante | Poovattaka thattichinni |
| 1986 | Ennennum Kannettante | Nizhalaay pozhiyum |
| 1986 | Ennennum Kannettante | Thankathala thaalam |
| 1986 | Ennennum Kannettante | Onnaanam Kulakkadavil |
| 1988 | Kudumbapuraanam | Thaalolam |
| 1988 | Kudumbapuraanam | Thappo Thappo |
| 1988 | Aaryan | Ponmuraliyoothum |
| 1988 | Aaryan | Shaanthimanthram |
| 1988 | Aaryan | Om Jai Jagadeesh Hare |
| 1988 | Vellaanakalude Naadu | Paaduvaan Ormakalil |
| 1989 | Varavelpu | Doore doore saagaram |
| 1989 | Varavelpu | Vellarapoomala mele |
| 1989 | The News | Paadi Njaan Aadatte |
| 1989 | The News | Thaarame |
| 1989 | Naagapanchami | Etho shokaantha |
| 1989 | Naagapanchami | Mallippoo |
| 1989 | Naagapanchami | Naagathaan |
| 1989 | Naagapanchami | Neythalaambal |
| 1989 | Kireedam | Kanneerppoovinte |
| 1989 | Kireedam | Medapponnodam |
| 1989 | Artham | Shyaamaambaram Neele |
| 1989 | Vadakkunokkiyanthram | Maayaamayooram |
| 1989 | Mudra | Puthumazhayaay |
| 1989 | Mudra | Vaanidavum |
| 1989 | Oru Vadakkan Veeragadha | Indulekha kanthurannu |
| 1989 | Oru Vadakkan Veeragadha | Unni Ganapathi Thamburaane |
| 1989 | Mazhavilkkaavadi | Pallitherundo |
| 1989 | Mazhavilkkaavadi | Thankathoni |
| 1989 | Mazhavilkkaavadi | Mainaakapponmudiyil |
| 1990 | Thaazhvaaram | Kannetha doore maru |
| 1990 | Saandram | Ponnithaloram |
| 1990 | Saandram | Kandallo |
| 1990 | Saandram | Kaithappoo ponpodi thooviya |
| 1990 | Doctor Pashupathi | Kanakam mannil |
| 1990 | Thoovalsparsham | Mandrajaalakam |
| 1990 | Thoovalsparsham | Maanathe |
| 1990 | Thoovalsparsham | Kannippeeli |
| 1990 | Parampara | Kolakkuruvi |
| 1990 | Kalikkalam | Poothaalam |
| 1990 | Kalikkalam | Aakaashagopuram |
| 1990 | Kuttettan | Devi paadam |
| 1990 | Kuttettan | Eerakkombinmele |
| 1990 | Kuttettan | Madhumaasa |
| 1990 | Gajakesariyogam | Niramaalakkaavil |
| 1990 | Gajakesariyogam | Aanachandam |
| 1990 | Kouthukavaarthakal | Muthaarathoranamekiya |
| 1990 | Kouthukavaarthakal | Neelakkankodiyil |
| 1990 | Cheriya Lokavum Valiya Manushyarum | Thoovennilaavu |
| 1990 | Cheriya Lokavum Valiya Manushyarum | Athikkulangaramelam |
| 1990 | Innale | Kannil Nin Meyyil |
| 1990 | Innale | Nee Vin Poo Pol |
| 1990 | Maalayogam | Manithaaliyaay |
| 1990 | Maalayogam | Poothumbi poonkazhuthil |
| 1990 | Maalayogam | Rajanee hridayam |
| 1990 | Thalayanamanthram | Maanam Niraye |
| 1990 | Thalayanamanthram | Maayapponmaane |
| 1990 | Thalayanamanthram | Thooval Vinnin Maarilthoovi |
| 1990 | Paavam Paavam Raajakumaaran | Kannaadikkayyil |
| 1990 | Paavam Paavam Raajakumaaran | Paathimey maranjathenthe |
| 1990 | Vidyaarambham | Poovarambin |
| 1990 | Vidyaarambham | Uthraalikkaavile |
| 1990 | Vidyaarambham | Paathiraakkombil |
| 1990 | His Highness Abdulla | Naadaroopini |
| 1990 | His Highness Abdulla | Devasabhathalam |
| 1990 | His Highness Abdulla | Gopikaa vasantham |
| 1990 | His Highness Abdulla | Pramadavanam |
| 1990 | His Highness Abdulla | Devasabhathalam |
| 1990 | Kshanakkathu | Thaam thakathakida dhim |
| 1990 | Kshanakkathu | Aa raagam madhumayamaam |
| 1990 | Kshanakkathu | Mangalangalarulum |
| 1990 | Kshanakkathu | Aaksadeepamennum |
| 1990 | Kshanakkathu | Sallaapam Kavithayaay |
| 1990 | Kshanakkathu | Mangalangalarulum |
| 1990 | Ananthanum Appukkuttanum Aanayundu | Melekkandathin |
| 1990 | Ananthanum Appukkuttanum Aanayundu | Manipravaalam |
| 1990 | Ananthanum Appukkuttanum Aanayundu | Mandaarappoovotha |
| 1990 | Ananthanum Appukkuttanum Aanayundu | Shaarada Chandrikayode |
| 1990 | Ananthanum Appukkuttanum Aanayundu | Mandaarappoovotha |
| 1990 | Ananthanum Appukkuttanum Aanayundu | Thaamarakkannane |
| 1990 | Smrithikal | Madhuchandrika Polum |
| 1990 | Smrithikal | Pookkaalam Kalamezhuthaan |
| 1990 | Smrithikal | Thankathakidurukki |
| 1991 | Kaakkathollaayiram | Madanappoo |
| 1991 | Kaakkathollaayiram | Paalaruvi Kuliraniyum |
| 1991 | Kaakkathollaayiram | Thaanaaro |
| 1991 | Sundarikkaakka | Ezhaamswargam |
| 1991 | Sundarikkaakka | Oru Janmamaam Ushasandhyayaay |
| 1991 | Sundarikkaakka | Neelaambal |
| 1991 | Saanthwanam | Unni vaavavo |
| 1991 | Saanthwanam | Swarakanyakamaar |
| 1991 | Saanthwanam | Unni Vaavavo |
| 1991 | Vishnulokam | Aadyavasanthame |
| 1991 | Vishnulokam | Kasthoori ente kasthoori |
| 1991 | Vishnulokam | Paanappuzha |
| 1991 | Vishnulokam | Mindaathathenthe |
| 1991 | Vishnulokam | Aadyavasanthame |
| 1991 | Vishnulokam | Humming |
| 1991 | Ente Sooryaputhrikku | Raakkolam |
| 1991 | Chaanchaattam | Vellipadavirangi Varu |
| 1991 | Chaanchaattam | Maanathundoru |
| 1991 | Kankettu | Nirakkudukka |
| 1991 | Kankettu | Gopeehridayam nirayunnu |
| 1991 | Thamburaan | Madhuvanam |
| 1991 | Thamburaan | Rajani unaroo |
| 1991 | Thamburaan | Yaamam |
| 1991 | Thamburaan | Maninoopuram |
| 1991 | Mookkilla Raajyathu | Kaashithumba |
| 1991 | Pookkaalam Varavayi | Etho Vaarmukilin |
| 1991 | Pookkaalam Varavayi | Etho Vaarmukilin |
| 1991 | Amaram | Hridayaraagathanthri |
| 1991 | Amaram | Azhake nin |
| 1991 | Amaram | Azhake |
| 1991 | Amaram | Vikaara naukayumay |
| 1991 | Amaram | Pulare Poonkodiyil |
| 1991 | Amaram | Hridayaraagathanthri |
| 1991 | Gaanamela | Yamuna nadiyaay |
| 1991 | Bharatham | Dhwani Prasaadam |
| 1991 | Bharatham | Gopaangane |
| 1991 | Bharatham | Raamakadha |
| 1991 | Bharatham | Raghuvamsapathe |
| 1991 | Bharatham | Sree vinayakam |
| 1991 | Bharatham | Dhwani Prasaadam |
| 1991 | Keli | Thaaram Vaalkannaadi Nokki |
| 1991 | Keli | Olelam Paadi |
| 1991 | Arangu | Muthukkili Mozhikale |
| 1991 | Arangu | Pookkadambilithirikkudanna |
| 1991 | Kanalkkaattu | Chethikkinungi |
| 1991 | Kanalkkaattu | Saanthwanam |
| 1991 | Abhimanyu | Maamala mele vaarmazha megham |
| 1991 | Abhimanyu | Classical |
| 1991 | Abhimanyu | Ganapathi Bappa Moriya |
| 1991 | Abhimanyu | Kandu njan |
| 1991 | Abhimanyu | Raamayanakkaatte |
| 1991 | Ulladakkam | Paathiraamazhayetho |
| 1991 | Ulladakkam | Anthiveyil |
| 1991 | Ulladakkam | Paathiraamazhayetho |
| 1991 | Ulladakkam | Paathiraamazhayetho D |
| 1991 | Ulladakkam | Maayaatha Maarivillitha |
| 1991 | Aamina Tailors | Aadimanaadam |
| 1991 | Aamina Tailors | Madamkonda thaarunyame |
| 1991 | Aamina Tailors | Neelathaamara |
| 1991 | Aamina Tailors | Aey haseen Madhuvo |
| 1991 | Aamina Tailors | Medappularipparavakale |
| 1991 | Aamina Tailors | Swargathe sulthan |
| 1991 | Aamina Tailors | Swargathe sulthan |
| 1991 | Sandesham | Thumbappoo Kodiyuduthu |
| 1991 | Kalari | Ilamaankidavupol |
| 1991 | Kalari | Mohanakaanana |
| 1991 | Kalari | Neehaaram pozhiyaaray |
| 1991 | Kalari | Ponmettile |
| 1991 | Kalari | Munthirivalliyil |
| 1991 | Apoorvam Chilar | Sakalamaana Pukilum |
| 1991 | Apoorvam Chilar | Chenthaaram Poothu |
| 1991 | Apoorvam Chilar | Ekaakiyaay |
| 1991 | Apoorvam Chilar | Thaaraganangalkku thaazhe |
| 1991 | Apoorvam Chilar | Thaaraganangalkku |
| 1991 | Apoorvam Chilar | Kilukilukkaampetty |
| 1991 | Njaan Gandharvan | Paalappoove |
| 1991 | Njaan Gandharvan | Devaanganangal kayyozhinja |
| 1991 | Njaan Gandharvan | Devi Aathmaraagam |
| 1991 | Nayam Vyakthamaakkunnu | Paadoo thalipoo |
| 1991 | The Honorable Pankunni Nair | Thankavilakkaanamma |
| 1991 | The Honorable Pankunni Nair | Thaaritham |
| 1991 | The Honorable Pankunni Nair | Nandanam Thookum |
| 1992 | Aayushkkaalam | Mounam Swaramaay |
| 1992 | Aayushkkaalam | Mounam Swaramaay |
| 1992 | Kunukkkitta Kozhi | Kaarmukham |
| 1992 | Snehasaagaram | Peelikkannezhuthi |
| 1992 | Snehasaagaram | Thankanilaa |
| 1992 | Snehasaagaram | Therottam |
| 1992 | Snehasaagaram | Akalathakalathu |
| 1992 | Kauravar | Kanaka nilaave |
| 1992 | Kauravar | Maarikuliril Neelathulasi |
| 1992 | Kauravar | Muthumanithooval |
| 1992 | Aadhaaram | Angadinnangaadinnu |
| 1992 | Aadhaaram | Manchaadimanikondu |
| 1992 | Ayalathe Addeham | Swantham Nizhalumaay |
| 1992 | Ayalathe Addeham | Sapthaswara Mandalameri |
| 1992 | Ezharapponnaana | Unnippirannalunaraan |
| 1992 | Ezharapponnaana | Manimegham |
| 1992 | Ezharapponnaana | Pranayamanthra |
| 1992 | Sooryamaanasam | Tharalitha Raavil |
| 1992 | Sooryamaanasam | Tharalitha Raavil |
| 1992 | Sooryamaanasam | Tharalitha Raavil |
| 1992 | Sooryamaanasam | Meghattherirangum sanchaari |
| 1992 | Sooryamaanasam | Kannil Nila |
| 1992 | Ennodishtam Koodaamo | Hey nilaakili |
| 1992 | Ennodishtam Koodaamo | Varna vasantham orungiya |
| 1992 | Ennodishtam Koodaamo | Kuvalaya mizhiyil |
| 1992 | Ennodishtam Koodaamo | Pokkiri Chamayana |
| 1992 | Ennodishtam Koodaamo | Hey nilaakili |
| 1992 | Kamaladalam | Kamaladalam mizhiyil |
| 1992 | Kamaladalam | Premodaaranaay |
| 1992 | Kamaladalam | Saayanthanam |
| 1992 | Kamaladalam | Aananda nadanam |
| 1992 | Kamaladalam | Aananda Nadanam |
| 1992 | Kamaladalam | Sumuhoorthamaay Thrayambakam |
| 1992 | Kamaladalam | Saayanthanam |
| 1992 | Savidham | Poonthennale |
| 1992 | Savidham | Brahmakamalam |
| 1992 | Savidham | Mounasarovara |
| 1992 | Savidham | Thoovaanam |
| 1992 | Savidham | Mounasarovara |
| 1992 | Kudumbasametham | Kamalaambike |
| 1992 | Kudumbasametham | Oonjaalurangi |
| 1992 | Kudumbasametham | Parthasaarathim |
| 1992 | Kudumbasametham | Neelaraavil |
| 1992 | Kudumbasametham | Gokulam |
| 1992 | Kudumbasametham | Oonjaalurangi |
| 1992 | Valayam | Chambaka mettile |
| 1992 | Valayam | Pulariyaay |
| 1992 | Valayam | Chambakamettile |
| 1992 | Adwaitham | Punaeilyar |
| 1992 | Adwaitham | Thallikkalayillenkil |
| 1992 | Adwaitham | Mazhavilkkothumpileri |
| 1992 | Adwaitham | Ambalappuzhe |
| 1992 | Adwaitham | Krishna krishna |
| 1992 | Adwaitham | Neelakkuyile |
| 1992 | Adwaitham | Sankramam |
| 1992 | Sadayam | Vaasantha Raavin |
| 1992 | Sadayam | Arabikkadhayile |
| 1992 | Poochaykkaaru Manikettum | Thinkal Noyambin |
| 1992 | Poochaykkaaru Manikettum | Sangeethame Saamaje |
| 1992 | Poochaykkaaru Manikettum | Chandanathoniyumaay |
| 1992 | Poochaykkaaru Manikettum | Maalathi Mandapangal |
| 1992 | Poochaykkaaru Manikettum | Sangeethame Saamaje |
| 1992 | Maarathon | Kolusittu |
| 1992 | Maarathon | Poomudiyizha |
| 1993 | Aalavattam | Rithu gaanam |
| 1993 | Aalavattam | Naamavum Roopavum |
| 1993 | Aalavattam | Peraarin Panineer |
| 1993 | Aalavattam | Mandana Chandrike |
| 1993 | Aalavattam | Paadaam Panimazhayaruliya |
| 1993 | Gaandharvam | Abalathwamalla |
| 1993 | Gaandharvam | Pranayatharangam |
| 1993 | Gaandharvam | Nenchil Kanchabaanam |
| 1993 | Gaandharvam | Maaliniyude Theerangal |
| 1993 | Gaandharvam | Omale Nin Mukham |
| 1993 | Gaandharvam | Aathire Nin Mukham |
| 1993 | Ammayaane Sathyam | Chandralekhayenthe |
| 1993 | Ammayaane Sathyam | Vaazhakkudappante |
| 1993 | Paithrukam Best Lyricist Award 1993 | Swayamvaramaay |
| 1993 | Paithrukam Best Lyricist Award 1993 | Vaalkkannezhuthiya |
| 1993 | Paithrukam Best Lyricist Award 1993 | Vaalkkanezhuthiya |
| 1993 | Paithrukam Best Lyricist Award 1993 | Shivam Shivadagananaayaka |
| 1993 | Paithrukam Best Lyricist Award 1993 | Neelaanjanappoovin |
| 1993 | Paithrukam Best Lyricist Award 1993 | Neelaanjanappoovin |
| 1993 | Koushalam | Kinaavin ilam thoolikayil |
| 1993 | Koushalam | Oraayiram |
| 1993 | Koushalam | Nilaavin ilam |
| 1993 | City Police | Ennolam Sundariyaarundu |
| 1993 | Sarovaram | Omkaara gangatharangam |
| 1993 | Sarovaram | Ambilichangaathi |
| 1993 | Sarovaram | Devamanohari Veendum |
| 1993 | Sarovaram | Ambilichangaathi |
| 1993 | Sarovaram | Moovanthppenninu |
| 1993 | Addeham Enna Iddeham | Priye Priye Vasanthamay |
| 1993 | Addeham Enna Iddeham | Aathmaanuthaapathin Manivilakke |
| 1993 | Paadheyam | Ganapathibhagavaan |
| 1993 | Paadheyam | Chandrakaantham kondu |
| 1993 | Paadheyam | Raasanilavinu |
| 1993 | Paadheyam | Prapancham |
| 1993 | Paadheyam | Jwaalamukhikal |
| 1993 | Paadheyam | Andhakaaram |
| 1993 | Paadheyam | Chandrakaantham |
| 1993 | Samooham | Kandeno |
| 1993 | Samooham | Thoomanjin nenchilothungi |
| 1993 | Vaalsalyam | Alayum Kaattin |
| 1993 | Vaalsalyam | Inneekkochuvarambin |
| 1993 | Vaalsalyam | Thaamarakkannan |
| 1993 | Chenkol | Madhuram jeevaamritha bindu |
| 1993 | Chenkol | Paathirappaalkadavil |
| 1993 | Chenkol | Madhuram jeevaamritha bindu |
| 1993 | Aagneyam | Manjumanjeera |
| 1993 | Aagneyam | Manjumanjeera |
| 1993 | Aagneyam | Nataraajamandapam |
| 1993 | Saubhaagyam | Onnuriyaadaan |
| 1993 | Saubhaagyam | Poovani Manchathil |
| 1993 | Saubhaagyam | Nombaraveene |
| 1993 | Chamayam | Raajahamsame |
| 1993 | Chamayam | Ragadevanum |
| 1993 | Chamayam | Anthikkadapurathu |
| 1993 | Thalamura | Neelakkarimbinte thundaanu |
| 1993 | Thalamura | Sundariyaam |
| 1993 | Thalamura | Mooka vasantham |
| 1993 | Kudumbasneham | Naagambada Kaavil |
| 1993 | Kudumbasneham | Panchami Chandrika |
| 1993 | Kudumbasneham | Ee Kaliyoru Kaliyallallo |
| 1993 | Paamaram | Muthum Pavizhavum |
| 1993 | Paamaram | Tharalamen Jeevanil |
| 1993 | Paamaram | Thulasee Sandhyayeriyum |
| 1993 | Paamaram | Sea I Love You |
| 1993 | Paamaram | Maadakamaay Rathri |
| 1993 | Paamaram | Naadodi Koothaadan Vaa |
| 1994 | Ezhuthachan | Janmaantharangale |
| 1994 | Ezhuthachan | Naadha nin gandharva |
| 1994 | Ezhuthachan | Samayam Manoharam |
| 1994 | Ezhuthachan | Naadha nin gandharva |
| 1994 | Ezhuthachan | Keli nandana |
| 1994 | Ezhuthachan | Swargavaathil |
| 1994 | Shudhamaddalam | Ganapathi paadam |
| 1994 | Shudhamaddalam | Pambayaattirambil |
| 1994 | Shudhamaddalam | Ente raajayogam |
| 1994 | Chakoram | Thaanaro Thannaro |
| 1994 | Chakoram | Paalaazhithirakalil |
| 1994 | Chakoram | Naattumaavin |
| 1994 | Chakoram | Naattumaavin |
| 1994 | Saagaram Saakshi | Karayaathe Kannurangu |
| 1994 | Saagaram Saakshi | Neelaakaasham |
| 1994 | Saagaram Saakshi | Shyaamasandhye Sooryanevide |
| 1994 | Saagaram Saakshi | Swargaminnente |
| 1994 | Saagaram Saakshi | Karayaathekannurangu |
| 1994 | Saagaram Saakshi | Karayaathekannurangu |
| 1994 | Pingaami | Themmaadikkaatte Ninnaatte |
| 1994 | Pingaami | Vennilaavo |
| 1994 | Gentleman Security | Ezhaam Swargam |
| 1994 | Gentleman Security | Jumma Jumma |
| 1994 | Gentleman Security | Paathiraavil |
| 1994 | Sopaanam | Thaaranoopuram Chaarthi |
| 1994 | Sopaanam | Ponmeghame |
| 1994 | Sopaanam | Vedaanudhdharathe |
| 1994 | Sopaanam | Aaradaye Manamohana |
| 1994 | Vendor Daniel State Licensy | Neelakkanna |
| 1994 | Vendor Daniel State Licensy | Leela Maadhavam |
| 1994 | Vendor Daniel State Licensy | Yesuve Naadha |
| 1994 | Vendor Daniel State Licensy | Lilly Vidarum-F |
| 1994 | Vendor Daniel State Licensy | Leela Maadhavam |
| 1994 | Vendor Daniel State Licensy | Lilly Vidarum |
| 1994 | Julee | Akkare ikkare pookkalam |
| 1994 | Julee | Anuraagachandranaay Varoo |
| 1994 | Sankeerthanam | Manoraajyamaake |
| 1994 | Sankeerthanam | Velippenkidaave |
| 1994 | Sankeerthanam | Sankeerthanam |
| 1994 | Sankeerthanam | Ethra December Kazhinju |
| 1994 | Geetham Sangeetham | Mangala Sreeranga |
| 1994 | Geetham Sangeetham | Nilaavin |
| 1994 | Geetham Sangeetham | Pakalinte Poonkaavil |
| 1994 | Geetham Sangeetham | Poovaninja |
| 1994 | Geetham Sangeetham | Ragalapam |
| 1994 | Geetham Sangeetham | Kalaavathi |
| 1994 | Geetham Sangeetham | Ragalapam FD - 2nd Version |
| 1994 | Production No 14 | Vasantha Raavin |
| 1994 | Production No 14 | Arabikkadhayile |
| 1995 | Sargavasantham | Sarggavasanthampole Nenchil |
| 1995 | Sargavasantham | Kanneerkkumbilil |
| 1995 | Sargavasantham | Yaaminee nin |
| 1995 | Sargavasantham | Kanneerkkumbilil neeraadan |
| 1995 | Saadaram | Madhuchandrike Nee |
| 1995 | Saadaram | Sharathkaalasandhye Neeyen |
| 1995 | Saadaram | Ambalakkombante |
| 1995 | Saadaram | Madhu Chandrike Nee |
| 1995 | Sindoorarekha | Kaalindiyil Thedi Nin |
| 1995 | Sindoorarekha | Premasruvaay |
| 1995 | Sindoorarekha | Pranathosmi Guruvayupuresham |
| 1995 | Sindoorarekha | Paahiraamaprabho |
| 1995 | Sindoorarekha | Naadam |
| 1995 | Sindoorarekha | Raavil veena |
| 1995 | Sindoorarekha | Ente Sindoorarekhayilengo |
| 1995 | Sindoorarekha | Ente Sindoorarekhayilengo |
| 1995 | Sindoorarekha | Pranathosmi |
| 1995 | Sreeraagam | Padavarnna tharivalayilaki |
| 1995 | Sreeraagam | Raavinte |
| 1995 | Sreeraagam | Neelakkadakkannil |
| 1995 | Sreeraagam | Omanappoonthinkal |
| 1995 | Sreeraagam | Kanakaangi swaravaahini |
| 1995 | Sreeraagam | Shambho |
| 1995 | Sreeraagam | Sree Raagam |
| 1995 | Sreeraagam | Raavinte |
| 1995 | Kaakkaykkum Poochaykkum Kalyaanam | Devaraaga doothike |
| 1995 | Kaakkaykkum Poochaykkum Kalyaanam | Ezhazhakumaay |
| 1995 | Kaakkaykkum Poochaykkum Kalyaanam | Paal Ninavilum |
| 1995 | Kaakkaykkum Poochaykkum Kalyaanam | Thaaraattu paadeettum |
| 1995 | Mazhayethum Munpe | Enthinu Veroru Sooryodayam |
| 1995 | Mazhayethum Munpe | Enthinu Veroru Sooryodayam |
| 1995 | Mazhayethum Munpe | Chicha Chicha.. |
| 1995 | Mazhayethum Munpe | Aathmaavin Pusthakathaalil |
| 1995 | Mazhayethum Munpe | Swarnappakshi Swarnappakshi |
| 1995 | Mazhayethum Munpe | Aathmavin Pusthakathaalil |
| 1995 | Kidilolkkidilam | Aarivar Aarivar |
| 1995 | Kidilolkkidilam | Praanaveena Meetti |
| 1995 | Kidilolkkidilam | Praanaveena Meetti |
| 1995 | Kidilolkkidilam | Mailaanchippaattinte |
| 1995 | Keerthanam | Kanni Nilaavinu |
| 1995 | Keerthanam | Kanavoru Sangeetham |
| 1995 | Keerthanam | Andhatha Moodiya |
| 1996 | Mimics Super 1000 | Jeevithaminiyoru |
| 1996 | Mimics Super 1000 | Kanmaniye Nin Chiriyil |
| 1996 | Thoovalkkottaaram | Aadyamaay kandanaal |
| 1996 | Thoovalkkottaaram | Paarvathi manohari |
| 1996 | Thoovalkkottaaram | Sindooram Peythirangi |
| 1996 | Thoovalkkottaaram | Sindooram Peythirangi |
| 1996 | Indraprastham | Bholobholobhayya |
| 1996 | Indraprastham | Mazhavillinkottaarathil |
| 1996 | Deshaadanam | Yaathrayaayi |
| 1996 | Deshaadanam | Kaliveedurangiyallo |
| 1996 | Deshaadanam | Nanmayerunna |
| 1996 | Deshaadanam | Naavaamukunda |
| 1996 | Deshaadanam | Engine Njaan |
| 1996 | Deshaadanam | Neelakkaarmukilvarnna |
| 1996 | Deshaadanam | Vettaykkorumakan |
| 1996 | Deshaadanam | Engane Njaan |
| 1996 | Deshaadanam | Kaliveedurangiyallo |
| 1996 | KL 7-95 Ernakulam North | Autokkaaranu Pattini |
| 1996 | KL 7-95 Ernakulam North | Jhumpa Jhumpa |
| 1996 | Udyanapalakan | Ekaantha Raavin Pinvaathil |
| 1996 | Udyanapalakan | Mayyazhippuzhayozhuki |
| 1996 | Udyanapalakan | Panineerppoovithalil |
| 1996 | Udyanapalakan | Kurunnu Thaamarakkuruvi |
| 1996 | Udyanapalakan | Mayyazhippuzhayozhuki |
| 1996 | Sulthaan Hyderali | Panchavarnnappainkilikku |
| 1996 | Sulthaan Hyderali | sulthan |
| 1996 | Sulthaan Hyderali | Sada nin |
| 1996 | Azhakiya Raavanan Best Lyricist Award 1996 | Sumangalikkuruvee |
| 1996 | Azhakiya Raavanan Best Lyricist Award 1996 | Pranayamani Thooval Kozhiyum |
| 1996 | Azhakiya Raavanan Best Lyricist Award 1996 | Vennilaa chandanakkinnam |
| 1996 | Azhakiya Raavanan Best Lyricist Award 1996 | Pranayamani Thooval Kozhiyum |
| 1996 | Azhakiya Raavanan Best Lyricist Award 1996 | Oh Dilruba |
| 1996 | Azhakiya Raavanan Best Lyricist Award 1996 | Vennilaa ChandanakKinnam |
| 1996 | Mr Clean | En Swarnamaane Ini Vidilla Ninne |
| 1996 | Mr Clean | Ezhunila Maalika Mele |
| 1996 | Mr Clean | Ezhunila Maalika Mele |
| 1996 | Mahaathma | Pullorkudavum |
| 1996 | Mahaathma | Raavirulum |
| 1996 | Kaliveedu | Deepaankuram |
| 1996 | Soorya Puthrikal | Vandanam En Vandanam |
| 1996 | Soorya Puthrikal | Kinnaaram |
| 1996 | Soorya Puthrikal | Alankaara Soudham |
| 1996 | Soorya Puthrikal | Ekaantha Raavil |
| 1996 | Soorya Puthrikal | Kulirum Kulirum |
| 1996 | Soorya Puthrikal | Chembakappoovil |
| 1996 | Soorya Puthrikal | Indraneela mizhikalil |
| 1996 | Kunkumacheppu | Kannaadippoonkavilil |
| 1996 | Kunkumacheppu | Ambala nadakal |
| 1996 | Kunkumacheppu | Vida Parayukayaanen |
| 1996 | Kunkumacheppu | Pattana Vilayattam |
| 1996 | Kunkumacheppu | Vida Parayukayaanen |
| 1996 | Pallivaathukkal Thommichan | Ee Raathri Laharipoondathaarkkuvendi |
| 1996 | Pallivaathukkal Thommichan | Onnu Kandaneram |
| 1996 | Pallivaathukkal Thommichan | Pakalinte Naadhanu |
| 1996 | Pallivaathukkal Thommichan | Pakalinte Naadhanu |
| 1996 | Sallaapam | Chandanacholayil Mungi |
| 1996 | Sallaapam | Panchavarnna |
| 1996 | Sallaapam | Ponnil Kulichu Ninnu |
| 1996 | Sallaapam | Paada Smarana Sukham |
| 1996 | Sallaapam | Ponnil Kulichu Ninnu( ) |
| 1996 | Dominic Presentation | Idaya Kanyaka Njan |
| 1996 | Dominic Presentation | Njanoru Madakara Youvanam |
| 1996 | Dominic Presentation | Idayakanyakayo Neeyen |
| 1996 | Kalyaana Saugandhikam | Aaraadhana Vigraham |
| 1996 | Kalyaana Saugandhikam | Kalyaana Sougandhikam |
| 1996 | Kalyaana Saugandhikam | Gopaala Hridayam |
| 1996 | Kalyaana Saugandhikam | Kalyaana Sougandhikam |
| 1997 | Irattakkuttikalude Achan | Nee Kaanumo |
| 1997 | Irattakkuttikalude Achan | Kannanennu Peru |
| 1997 | Irattakkuttikalude Achan | Ethra Neramaay Njaan |
| 1997 | Irattakkuttikalude Achan | Nee Kaanumo |
| 1997 | Innalekalillaathe | Ithalazhakil malar |
| 1997 | Innalekalillaathe | Aapaada Madhuramee |
| 1997 | Innalekalillaathe | Kanakaabhilaashangal |
| 1997 | Innalekalillaathe | Kanakaabhilaashangal |
| 1997 | Innalekalillaathe | Unarunaroo Janmasayoojyame |
| 1997 | Kaliyaattam | Ennodenthinee Pinakkam |
| 1997 | Kaliyaattam | Vannaathippuzhayude |
| 1997 | Kaliyaattam | Velikku Veluppaankaalam |
| 1997 | Kaliyaattam | Ennodenthinee Pinakkam |
| 1997 | Kaliyaattam | Kathivanoor Veerane |
| 1997 | Kaliyaattam | Kathivanoor Veerane |
| 1997 | Kaliyaattam | Ezhimalayolam |
| 1997 | Kaliyaattam | Sreeraagam Paadum Veene |
| 1997 | Kaliyaattam | Paadaathe Paadunna Raagam |
| 1997 | Killikkurishiyile Kudumbamela | Maaya Theerame |
| 1997 | Killikkurishiyile Kudumbamela | Chirithinkal Azhakode |
| 1997 | Killikkurishiyile Kudumbamela | Enthishttamaanu |
| 1997 | Killikkurishiyile Kudumbamela | Mindaappenninte Karalile |
| 1997 | Killikkurishiyile Kudumbamela | Pennin Vaaku Kelkkenam |
| 1997 | Killikkurishiyile Kudumbamela | Kaakkathampuraatti |
| 1997 | Killikkurishiyile Kudumbamela | Pennin Vaaku Kelkkenam |
| 1997 | Kannur | Kadalariyilla |
| 1997 | Kannur | Kadalariyilla |
| 1997 | Kannur | Veettumaavin |
| 1997 | Kannur | Chaaverkidaangale |
| 1997 | Kannur | Kadalariyilla |
| 1997 | Kannur | Oruraavu |
| 1997 | Kannur | Oru raavu kondu |
| 1997 | Kannur | Aikyathin Samarathin |
| 1997 | Kannur | Yaathrayaay |
| 1997 | Bhoothakannaadi | Aashaamarathinte |
| 1997 | Bhoothakannaadi | Thala chaaykkaan |
| 1997 | Bhoothakannaadi | Ashta Naagangale |
| 1997 | Bhoothakannaadi | Vishnu Bhagavaante Kaarunyam |
| 1997 | Ullaasapoonkaattu | Paathiraathennalaay D |
| 1997 | Ullaasapoonkaattu | Ammayennaadyathe Pranava |
| 1997 | Ullaasapoonkaattu | Kannuneer Paadathe |
| 1997 | Ullaasapoonkaattu | Paathiraathennalaay |
| 1997 | Ullaasapoonkaattu | Paathiraathennalaay |
| 1997 | Ullaasapoonkaattu | Pookkaarippenninoru |
| 1997 | Ullaasapoonkaattu | Pookkaarippenninoru |
| 1997 | Ullaasapoonkaattu | Kinnaara Kaakkaathikkiliye |
| 1997 | Ullaasapoonkaattu | Neelanaalukettinullil |
| 1997 | Snehadoothu | Enthe puthu vasanthame |
| 1997 | Snehadoothu | Kanivaaka poove |
| 1997 | Snehadoothu | Muthu makale ente |
| 1997 | Snehadoothu | Anthippoomaanam |
| 1997 | Snehadoothu | Thudi Thudikkana Malayadivaaram |
| 1997 | Kaliyoonjaal | Manavaatti |
| 1997 | Kaliyoonjaal | Varna Vrindaavanam |
| 1997 | Kaliyoonjaal | Kalyaanappallakkil |
| 1997 | Kaliyoonjaal | Akkuthikkuthaadaan |
| 1997 | Kaliyoonjaal | Manikuttikkurumbulla |
| 1997 | Kaliyoonjaal | Shaaradendu Paadi |
| 1997 | Kaliyoonjaal | Jaga Vandana |
| 1997 | Kaliyoonjaal | Shaaradendu Paadi |
| 1997 | Kaliyoonjaal | Varna Vrindaavanam |
| 1997 | Kaliyoonjaal | Oru Naalum Kelkatha |
| 1997 | Hitler Brothers | Panimathi |
| 1997 | Hitler Brothers | Kannaadi Maalika |
| 1997 | Kudamaattam | Vellinilaavil Venchaamaram |
| 1997 | Kudamaattam | Thiruvaathiraraavupolum |
| 1997 | Kudamaattam | Anivairakkallumaala |
| 1997 | Kudamaattam | Neram Poy (Niranazhi Poovum) |
| 1997 | Kudamaattam | Thappum Kottaathappaani |
| 1997 | Kudamaattam | Thiruvaathiraraavupolum |
| 1997 | Kudamaattam | Neram Poy (Niranazhi Poovum) |
| 1997 | Suvarna Simhaasanam | Kuttanaadan Kaayalil |
| 1997 | Suvarna Simhaasanam | Pranayaaardra Mohajathikal |
| 1997 | Suvarna Simhaasanam | Raakkilikal |
| 1997 | Suvarna Simhaasanam | Raakkilikal |
| 1997 | Suvarna Simhaasanam | Samkramappoonthinkale |
| 1997 | Suvarna Simhaasanam | Kannadi Maalikayil |
| 1997 | Arjunan Pillayum Anchu Makkalum | Evide Nin Daivaamsham |
| 1997 | Arjunan Pillayum Anchu Makkalum | Vellikkinnam Niranju |
| 1997 | Kaarunyam | Marakkumo Nee Ente Mounagaanam |
| 1997 | Kaarunyam | Poomukham |
| 1997 | Kaarunyam | Valampiri shankil |
| 1997 | Kaarunyam | Maranjupoyathenthe |
| 1997 | Kaarunyam | Marakkumo Nee Ente |
| 1997 | Kaarunyam | Daivame Ninte |
| 1997 | Kaarunyam | Daivame Ninte |
| 1997 | Oraal Maathram | Kaarvarnane Kando Sakhi |
| 1997 | Oraal Maathram | Chaithranilaavinte |
| 1997 | Oraal Maathram | Aardramaay |
| 1997 | Oraal Maathram | Aardramaay |
| 1997 | Oraal Maathram | Kaarvarnane Kando Sakhi |
| 1997 | Oraal Maathram | Mangalappaala |
| 1997 | Ithaa Oru Snehagaadha | Thaarakangal thazhe vannu |
| 1997 | Ithaa Oru Snehagaadha | Karunaamayee |
| 1997 | Ithaa Oru Snehagaadha | Indraneelaraavu |
| 1997 | Ithaa Oru Snehagaadha | Thaarakangal |
| 1997 | Ithaa Oru Snehagaadha | Vachaname |
| 1997 | Ithaa Oru Snehagaadha | Karunaamayee |
| 1997 | Ithaa Oru Snehagaadha | Sa Ri Ga Pa Dha Sa |
| 1997 | Maanasam | Vaavaavo vaavurangoo |
| 1997 | Maanasam | Muthe Ninne |
| 1997 | Maanasam | Engaanen Amme |
| 1997 | Maanasam | Vaavaavo vaavurangoo |
| 1997 | Asuravamsham | Ee Swara Sandhya Sabhalam |
| 1997 | Vaachalam | Paraagamaay Pozhiyunnu |
| 1997 | Vaachalam | Kannaadiyaattil |
| 1997 | Vaachalam | Aathmaavil Thengunnallo |
| 1997 | Vaachalam | Mindanda Mindanda |
| 1997 | Vaachalam | Paraagamaay Pozhiyunnu |
| 1997 | Sammaanam | Poovaal Thumbi |
| 1997 | Sammaanam | Devi Ennum Neeyen |
| 1997 | Sammaanam | Maampulli Marukulla Midukki |
| 1997 | Sammaanam | Njaalippurakkaala Njaavalppurakkaala |
| 1997 | Chandana Varnatheru | Kanneer thudaykkuvaan ammayundo |
| 1998 | Aayushmaan Bhava | Anthippoomaanam |
| 1998 | Aayushmaan Bhava | Sreepaalkkadalil |
| 1998 | Aayushmaan Bhava | Raadhaamaadhavamaayi |
| 1998 | Thaalolam | Iniyennu Kaanum Makale |
| 1998 | Thaalolam | Kanne Urangurangu |
| 1998 | Thaalolam | Omanathinkalkkidaavo |
| 1998 | Thaalolam | Gopaalike |
| 1998 | Thaalolam | Smaravaaram |
| 1998 | Thaalolam | Then Nilaavil |
| 1998 | Thaalolam | Paadaatha Vrindaavanam |
| 1998 | Thaalolam | Then Nilaavil |
| 1998 | Anuraagakkottaaram | Chirichente Manassile |
| 1998 | Anuraagakkottaaram | Chirichente Manassile D |
| 1998 | Anuraagakkottaaram | Mohathin Mutheduthu |
| 1998 | Anuraagakkottaaram | Ponmaanam Ee Kaikalil |
| 1998 | Anuraagakkottaaram | Ponmaanam Ee Kaikalil |
| 1998 | Anuraagakkottaaram | Ponnum Thinkal Thaarattum |
| 1998 | Anuraagakkottaaram | Thenchodi Poove Maanmizhi Kanave |
| 1998 | Manthrimaalikayil Manassammatham | Thadukkaamengil Thadukeenedo |
| 1998 | Manthrimaalikayil Manassammatham | Karumaadikkutta |
| 1998 | Manthrimaalikayil Manassammatham | Mizhiyil Indraneelam |
| 1998 | Manthrimaalikayil Manassammatham | Peelikkombathaadum |
| 1998 | Manthrimaalikayil Manassammatham | Prapanjamunarum |
| 1998 | Manthrimaalikayil Manassammatham | Prapanjamunarum |
| 1998 | Manthrimaalikayil Manassammatham | Thirithelinja |
| 1998 | Ennu Swantham Janakikkutty | Paarvana Paalmazha |
| 1998 | Ennu Swantham Janakikkutty | Then Thulumpum |
| 1998 | Ennu Swantham Janakikkutty | Chembakappoo Mottinullil |
| 1998 | Ennu Swantham Janakikkutty | Ampilippoovattam |
| 1998 | Ennu Swantham Janakikkutty | Ambilippoovattam |
| 1998 | Ennu Swantham Janakikkutty | Chembakappoo Mottinullil |
| 1998 | Ennu Swantham Janakikkutty | Ambili Poovum |
| 1998 | Ennu Swantham Janakikkutty | Innalathe Pon |
| 1998 | Ormacheppu | Viraham nurayum nilaave |
| 1998 | Ormacheppu | Unmaadam karaliloru unmaadam |
| 1998 | Ormacheppu | Yaaminee Mandapangal |
| 1998 | Ormacheppu | Yaaminee Mandapangal |
| 1998 | Kaattathoru Penpoovu | Ee Kaattinu |
| 1998 | Kaattathoru Penpoovu | Manassilenthe |
| 1998 | Kaattathoru Penpoovu | Indumaalini |
| 1998 | Kaattathoru Penpoovu | Ee Kaattinu |
| 1998 | Kaattathoru Penpoovu | Manassilenthe |
| 1998 | Thattakam | Baashpa Saagara |
| 1998 | Thattakam | Baashpa Saagara |
| 1998 | Thattakam | Devalokam pole |
| 1998 | Thattakam | Pakalkkinaavil |
| 1998 | Thattakam | Sreepaadame gathi jagadambike |
| 1998 | Thattakam | Shilayaay Piraviyundenkil |
| 1998 | Thattakam | Nandabaalam |
| 1998 | Thattakam | Chandanakkaavile |
| 1998 | Ayaal Kadha ezhthukayaanu | Aakaashathaamara |
| 1998 | Ayaal Kadha ezhthukayaanu | Marathakaraavin Karayil |
| 1998 | Ayaal Kadha ezhthukayaanu | Thinkaloru Thankathambaalam |
| 1998 | Ayaal Kadha ezhthukayaanu | Etho nidrathan |
| 1998 | Ayaal Kadha ezhthukayaanu | Etho nidrathan |
| 1998 | Ayaal Kadha ezhthukayaanu | Maane |
| 1998 | Ayaal Kadha ezhthukayaanu | Kuppivala Kilukile |
| 1998 | Harikrishnans | Minnalkkaivala |
| 1998 | Harikrishnans | Ponnaambal |
| 1998 | Harikrishnans | Samayamithapoorva |
| 1998 | Harikrishnans | Ponne ponnambili |
| 1998 | Harikrishnans | Poojaabimbam Mizhi Thurannu |
| 1998 | Harikrishnans | Samayamithapoorva |
| 1998 | Harikrishnans | Ponnaambal |
| 1998 | Harikrishnans | Minnalkkaivala Violin |
| 1998 | Harikrishnans | Samayamithapoorva |
| 1998 | Siddhaartha | Maayika Yaamam |
| 1998 | Siddhaartha | Poomaanathe |
| 1998 | Siddhaartha | Alliyaambalaay Thaalamenthi Nee |
| 1998 | Siddhaartha | Kaivanna Thankamalle |
| 1998 | Siddhaartha | Maayika Yaamam |
| 1998 | Siddhaartha | Kaivanna Thankamalle |
| 1999 | Friends | Kadalkkaattin Nenjil |
| 1999 | Friends | Shivamallippoove Innenthekopam |
| 1999 | Friends | Pularikkinnam |
| 1999 | Friends | Kadalkkaattin Nenjil |
| 1999 | Panchapaandavar | Neela kamaladalam Azhagin Alakalil |
| 1999 | Panchapaandavar | Kaarikkikkilli |
| 1999 | Panchapaandavar | Kaithaalam Kettille |
| 1999 | Panchapaandavar | Aarodu Njan Ente Kadha Parayum |
| 1999 | Panchapaandavar | Evide En Dukham |
| 1999 | Panchapaandavar | Evide En Dukham |
| 1999 | Panchapaandavar | Unarum Vare |
| 1999 | Panchapaandavar | Neela Kamaladalam |
| 1999 | Panchapaandavar | Kaithaalam Kettille |
| 1999 | Udayapuram Sulthan | Iniyenthu Paadendu Njan |
| 1999 | Udayapuram Sulthan | Maanikayaveena |
| 1999 | Udayapuram Sulthan | Gaayathi gaayathi |
| 1999 | Udayapuram Sulthan | Ananda Nandane Sandheham |
| 1999 | Udayapuram Sulthan | Kanakasabhaathalam |
| 1999 | Udayapuram Sulthan | Chittolam |
| 1999 | Udayapuram Sulthan | Kanakasabhaathalam |
| 1999 | Udayapuram Sulthan | Iniyenthu Paadendu Njan |
| 1999 | Veendum Chila Veettukaaryangal | Vakkukal Vende |
| 1999 | Veendum Chila Veettukaaryangal | Pinnilaavin Poo Vidarnnu |
| 1999 | Veendum Chila Veettukaaryangal | Pinnilaavin Poo Vidarnnu |
| 1999 | Veendum Chila Veettukaaryangal | Kannetha Mala Maamala Mele |
| 1999 | Veendum Chila Veettukaaryangal | Othu Pidichavar Kappal Keri |
| 1999 | Veendum Chila Veettukaaryangal | Mounam Ente Maayaamohathil |
| 1999 | Agnisaakshi | Jwaalamughamaay |
| 1999 | Agnisaakshi | Pankaja Vairi |
| 1999 | Agnisaakshi | Vaarthinkaludikkaatha |
| 1999 | Agnisaakshi | Kannaanthali |
| 1999 | Agnisaakshi | Gange Mahaa Mangale |
| 1999 | Agnisaakshi | Mangalaathira |
| 1999 | Agnisaakshi | Vaarthinkaludikkaatha |
| 1999 | Saaphalyam | Kaakke kaakke |
| 1999 | Saaphalyam | Kannuneer Thennale |
| 1999 | Saaphalyam | Maarivilludupanninju |
| 1999 | Saaphalyam | Ponnolappanthalil |
| 1999 | Saaphalyam | Kaakke Kaakke |
| 1999 | Mazhavillu | Pullimaan kidaave |
| 1999 | Mazhavillu | Shivadam Shivanaamam |
| 1999 | Mazhavillu | Ponnolathumbil |
| 1999 | Mazhavillu | Raavin Nilaakkaayal |
| 1999 | Mazhavillu | Kili Vaathilil |
| 1999 | Mazhavillu | Raavin Nilaakkaayal |
| 1999 | Mazhavillu | Pulliman Kidave |
| 1999 | Mazhavillu | Kili Vaathilil |
| 1999 | Chandamama | Chiriyoonjaal |
| 1999 | Chandamama | Rojappoo |
| 1999 | Chandamama | Unaru oru kumbil ponnum |
| 1999 | Chandamama | Unaroo |
| 1999 | Chandamama | Chiri |
| 1999 | Chandamama | Aakaashakkottayile |
| 1999 | Chandamama | Rojaappoo kavilathu |
| 1999 | Chandamama | Chandamaama |
| 1999 | Mizhiyariyaathe | Kuthirayumaayi |
| 1999 | Mizhiyariyaathe | Vasantha Soorya |
| 1999 | Mizhiyariyaathe | Raaga Chandran |
| 1999 | Mizhiyariyaathe | Naadha Kalavari Choodiya |
| 2000 | Life is Beautiful | Vaalittezhuthiya Happy |
| 2000 | Life is Beautiful | Iniyenthu Nalkanam |
| 2000 | Life is Beautiful | Aaraadhana |
| 2000 | Life is Beautiful | Keli Nilaavoru |
| 2000 | Life is Beautiful | O hohoho ho |
| 2000 | Life is Beautiful | Keli Nilaavoru |
| 2000 | Life is Beautiful | Vaalittezhuthiya Pathos |
| 2000 | Aanamuttathe Aangalamar | Veedaaru maasam |
| 2000 | Aanamuttathe Aangalamar | Veedaaru Maasam |
| 2000 | Aanamuttathe Aangalamar | Thaalolam Paadan |
| 2000 | Aanamuttathe Aangalamar | Pinakkamo |
| 2000 | Kochu Kochu Santhoshangal | Chellakkaatte |
| 2000 | Kochu Kochu Santhoshangal | Shivakaradamaru |
| 2000 | Kochu Kochu Santhoshangal | Palappoomazha |
| 2000 | Kochu Kochu Santhoshangal | Title song |
| 2000 | Kochu Kochu Santhoshangal | Ghanashyaama |
| 2000 | Kochu Kochu Santhoshangal | Kodamanjin Thaazhvarayil |
| 2000 | Devadoothan | Karale Nin Kai |
| 2000 | Devadoothan | En Jeevane |
| 2000 | Devadoothan | Poove Poove Paalappoove |
| 2000 | Devadoothan | Mathaappoothiri |
| 2000 | Shaantham | Aattunottundaaya |
| 2000 | Shaantham | Kannaa Odivaa |
| 2000 | Shaantham | Paandava |
| 2000 | Shaantham | Amma Yashoda |
| 2000 | Shaantham | Aattunottundaaya |
| 2000 | Shaantham | Amma Yashoda |
| 2000 | Shaantham | Shaantha Gambheeranaam |
| 2000 | Shaantham | Sumasaayaka |
| 2000 | Shaantham | Chuttum Kulamundu |
| 2000 | Vinayapoorvam Vidyaadharan | Enniyaal Theeratha |
| 2000 | Vinayapoorvam Vidyaadharan | Paadanariyilla |
| 2000 | Vinayapoorvam Vidyaadharan | Paadanariyilla |
| 2000 | Vinayapoorvam Vidyaadharan | Kaattu Valli |
| 2000 | Vinayapoorvam Vidyaadharan | Ponnumkudathinu |
| 2000 | Vinayapoorvam Vidyaadharan | Tholil Maarappu |
| 2000 | Vinayapoorvam Vidyaadharan | Kaattu Valli Oonjaalaadaam |
| 2000 | Vinayapoorvam Vidyaadharan | Enniyaal Theeraatha |
| 2000 | Priye Ninakkaayi | Innale rathriyil |
| 2000 | Sathyameva Jayathe | Kalyaanappattum |
| 2000 | Sathyameva Jayathe | Silusilu |
| 2000 | Sathyameva Jayathe | Ambilipooppennium |
| 2000 | Sathyameva Jayathe | Dhak dhak |
| 2000 | Mazha | Himashaila |
| 2000 | Mazha | Himashaila |
| 2000 | Thenkaashippattanam | Kadamizhiyil |
| 2000 | Thenkaashippattanam | Gulumaalu |
| 2000 | Thenkaashippattanam | Engu Poy Nee |
| 2000 | Thenkaashippattanam | Pachappavizha |
| 2000 | Thenkaashippattanam | Oru Simhamalayum Kaattil |
| 2000 | Kannaadikkadavathu | Ishtamaanu |
| 2000 | Kannaadikkadavathu | Onnudichaal |
| 2000 | Kannaadikkadavathu | Eleppulyante |
| 2000 | Kannaadikkadavathu | Chinni chinni |
| 2000 | Kannaadikkadavathu | Engaano sneharamam |
| 2000 | Kannaadikkadavathu | Sharadindu Naalam |
| 2000 | Kannaadikkadavathu | Chemmmaana chempulayante |
| 2000 | Kannaadikkadavathu | Sandhyaa Raagamam |
| 2000 | Sathyam Sivam Sundaram | Avva avva |
| 2000 | Sathyam Sivam Sundaram | Chandrahridayam |
| 2000 | Sathyam Sivam Sundaram | Angakale |
| 2000 | Sathyam Sivam Sundaram | Walking in the moonlight |
| 2000 | Sathyam Sivam Sundaram | Sooryanay Thazhuki |
| 2000 | Pavizhakkottaram | Thenkanangal Maarithalaay |
| 2000 | Pavizhakkottaram | Abhilaashangalil Chaarutha Vaniyil |
| 2001 | Ishtam | Chanchala druthapada |
| 2001 | Ishtam | Kali parayum |
| 2001 | Ishtam | Vattathil |
| 2001 | Ishtam | Ishtam ishtam |
| 2001 | Ishtam | Kandu Kandu Kandilla |
| 2001 | Ishtam | Kandu Kandu Kandilla |
| 2001 | Aayilyam Naalil | Oh Anupama Nee |
| 2001 | Aayilyam Naalil | Oh Anupama Nee |
| 2001 | Aayilyam Naalil | Mama Maanasa |
| 2001 | Sundarapurushan | Konchedi |
| 2001 | Sundarapurushan | Thankamanassin |
| 2001 | Sundarapurushan | Konchedi konchum |
| 2001 | Sundarapurushan | Thodunnathu |
| 2001 | Sundarapurushan | Bhoochakravalangalil |
| 2001 | Sundarapurushan | Thurakkaatha Ponvaathil |
| 2001 | Sundarapurushan | Thankamanassin |
| 2001 | Aaraam Jaalakam | Pinangaan |
| 2001 | Aaraam Jaalakam | Amme Devi |
| 2001 | Aaraam Jaalakam | Poomaanappadivaathil |
| 2001 | Aaraam Jaalakam | Kaadinezhazhaku |
| 2001 | Aaraam Jaalakam | Mangalappakshi |
| 2001 | Aaraam Jaalakam | Aadaadunni chaanchaadu |
| 2001 | Aaraam Jaalakam | Aadaadunni Chaanchaadu |
| 2001 | Aaraam Jaalakam | Pinangaan |
| 2001 | One Man Show | Pavizhamalar penkodi |
| 2001 | One Man Show | Rosaappoo rosaappoo |
| 2001 | One Man Show | Kaashithumba |
| 2001 | One Man Show | Aadyathe |
| 2001 | One Man Show | Raakkadambil |
| 2001 | One Man Show | Oru mulam |
| 2001 | One Man Show | Neelaraavin |
| 2001 | One Man Show | Niramazhayil |
| 2001 | Nakshathrangal Parayaathirunnathu | Arikathoruneela |
| 2001 | Nakshathrangal Parayaathirunnathu | Nishaagandhi Poothu |
| 2001 | Nakshathrangal Parayaathirunnathu | Anthimazha Mayangi |
| 2001 | Nakshathrangal Parayaathirunnathu | Kukku Kukku Kuyile |
| 2001 | Nakshathrangal Parayaathirunnathu | Thillaithillai |
| 2001 | Uthaman | Kadalum kadangalum |
| 2001 | Uthaman | Paalaazhi Theeram Kandu Njan |
| 2001 | Uthaman | Pathinezhin Azhakaay |
| 2001 | Uthaman | Anthikkudam |
| 2001 | Theerthaadanam | Enthennariyaatha |
| 2001 | Theerthaadanam | Souparnika |
| 2001 | Theerthaadanam | Ee Valappottum |
| 2001 | Theerthaadanam | Mooli Mooli |
| 2001 | Theerthaadanam | Sindoorathilakaanjithe |
| 2001 | Theerthaadanam | Mooli Mooli |
| 2001 | Theerthaadanam | Mukham Manassin |
| 2001 | Theerthaadanam | Mukham Manassin |
| 2002 | Kalyaanaraman | Kadhayile |
| 2002 | Kalyaanaraman | Raakkadal |
| 2002 | Kalyaanaraman | Kai thudi thalam |
| 2002 | Kalyaanaraman | Thinkale |
| 2002 | Kalyaanaraman | Thumbikkalyaanathinu |
| 2002 | Kalyaanaraman | Kadhayile Rajakumaariyum |
| 2002 | Kalyaanaraman | Raakkadal D |
| 2002 | Kalyaanaraman | Onnaam Malakeri |
| 2002 | Thaandavam | Paalum kudameduthu |
| 2002 | Thaandavam | Chandramani kammalaninju |
| 2002 | Thaandavam | Himagiri nirakal |
| 2002 | Thaandavam | Pottuthotta kiliye |
| 2002 | Thaandavam | Kombedu kuzhaledu |
| 2002 | Thaandavam | Aaraamam Pookkunnu |
| 2002 | Thaandavam | Paalkkinnam |
| 2002 | Yaathrakkaarude Shradhaykku | Nombarakkoottile |
| 2002 | Yaathrakkaarude Shradhaykku | Vattayilappanthalittu |
| 2002 | Yaathrakkaarude Shradhaykku | Onnu Thodanullil |
| 2002 | Yaathrakkaarude Shradhaykku | Onnu Thodanullil |
| 2002 | Pranayamanithooval | Chandanamalla |
| 2002 | Pranayamanithooval | Valakilukkam |
| 2002 | Pranayamanithooval | Omana laila |
| 2002 | Pranayamanithooval | Njanarinjallo Naalaalarinjallo |
| 2002 | Pranayamanithooval | Chandanamalla |
| 2002 | Pranayamanithooval | Omana Laila |
| 2002 | Pranayamanithooval | Omana Laila |
| 2002 | Nammal | Sukhamaanee Nilaavu |
| 2002 | Nammal | Raakshasi En Karalil |
| 2002 | Nammal | Kaathu Kaathoru |
| 2002 | Nammal | Ennamme Onnu Kaanan |
| 2002 | Nammal | Sukhamaanee Nilaavu |
| 2002 | Nammal | Sooryane |
| 2002 | Kannaki | Iniyoru Janmamundengil |
| 2002 | Kannaki | Kodungalooramme |
| 2002 | Kannaki | Karineelakkannazhaki |
| 2002 | Kannaki | Pooparikkaan |
| 2002 | Kannaki | Angu Vadakku |
| 2002 | Kannaki | Ennu Varum Nee |
| 2002 | Kaalachakram | Sweet Dreams |
| 2002 | Kaalachakram | Enthe Maunam Enthe Kopam |
| 2002 | Kaalachakram | Shivashailam Kireedam |
| 2002 | Kaalachakram | Kudapole |
| 2002 | Kaalachakram | Kaalachakram |
| 2002 | Kaalachakram | Sweet Dreams |
| 2002 | Neelakaasham Niraye | Kaalame Enthinaay |
| 2003 | Swapnakkoodu | Karuppinazhaku |
| 2003 | Swapnakkoodu | Marakkaam Ellaam Marakkaam |
| 2003 | Swapnakkoodu | Maayaa Sandhye |
| 2003 | Swapnakkoodu | Malarkkiliyinayude Thaliranikkoottil |
| 2003 | Swapnakkoodu | Oru Poomaathram |
| 2003 | Swapnakkoodu | Ishtamalleda Enikkishtamalleda |
| 2003 | Mazhanoolkkanavu | Etho Chaithra Varnangal |
| 2003 | Mazhanoolkkanavu | Kuttichangaathi Minda |
| 2003 | Pattanathil Sundaran | Kannanaayaal Raadha Venam |
| 2003 | Pattanathil Sundaran | Baala Baala Gopaalaa |
| 2003 | Pattanathil Sundaran | Thakkidakkutta |
| 2003 | Pattanathil Sundaran | Deva Deva |
| 2003 | Chronic Bachelor | Chundathu Chethippoo |
| 2003 | Chronic Bachelor | Swayamvara Chandrike |
| 2003 | Chronic Bachelor | Chiri Chiriyo |
| 2003 | Chronic Bachelor | Kannil nilaavu |
| 2003 | Chronic Bachelor | Shilayilninnum Unaru Nee |
| 2003 | Vellithira | Nee Manimukilaadakal |
| 2003 | Vellithira | Hridayasakhee |
| 2003 | Ammakkilikoodu | Ammakkili |
| 2003 | Ammakkilikoodu | Hridayageethamaay |
| 2003 | Ammakkilikoodu | Enthinee paattinu |
| 2003 | Ammakkilikoodu | Ponkoodu |
| 2003 | Ammakkilikoodu | Hridayageethamaay |
| 2003 | Ammakkilikoodu | Vennakkal |
| 2003 | Kasthoorimaan | Azhake |
| 2003 | Kasthoorimaan | One plus one |
| 2003 | Kasthoorimaan | Kaarkuzhali |
| 2003 | Kasthoorimaan | Poonkuyile |
| 2003 | Kasthoorimaan | Maarivilthooval |
| 2003 | Pulivaal Kalyaanam | Thevaaratheruvu |
| 2003 | Pulivaal Kalyaanam | Gujarathi |
| 2003 | Pulivaal Kalyaanam | Poovallikkaavil |
| 2003 | Pulivaal Kalyaanam | Aarundiniyaarundu |
| 2003 | Pulivaal Kalyaanam | Aaru Paranju |
| 2003 | Singaari Bolona | Singaari Bolona |
| 2003 | Singaari Bolona | Silayazhaku |
| 2003 | Singaari Bolona | Mohithane manmadhane |
| 2003 | Singaari Bolona | Alakangal maadiyum |
| 2003 | Singaari Bolona | Alasayaamam tharalamaayi |
| 2003 | Singaari Bolona | Kokkakko |
| 2003 | Thilakkam | Poovidarum |
| 2003 | Thilakkam | Ee Kannan Kaattum Kusruthi |
| 2003 | Thilakkam | Enikkoru Pennundu |
| 2003 | Thilakkam | Saare Saare |
| 2003 | Thilakkam | Evide |
| 2003 | Thilakkam | Nee Oru Puzhayaay |
| 2003 | Thilakkam | Veyilaliyum Munpe |
| 2003 | Swantham Maalavika | Engaanu Nee |
| 2003 | Swantham Maalavika | Chirikku Chirikku Midukki |
| 2004 | Black | Thinkalkkalaye |
| 2004 | Youth Festival | Valentine valentine |
| 2004 | Youth Festival | Poo moodum |
| 2004 | Youth Festival | Enne ninakinnu priyamalle |
| 2004 | Youth Festival | Roja Roja |
| 2004 | Youth Festival | School Daysinu Goodbye |
| 2004 | Shambu | Ponnambiliye |
| 2004 | Shambu | Odum kuthirakkutty |
| 2004 | Shambu | Bomma |
| 2004 | Shambu | Sandhye |
| 2004 | Shambu | Pallakku |
| 2004 | Vismayathumbathu | Priyane Neeyenne |
| 2004 | Vismayathumbathu | Konchi Konchi |
| 2004 | Vismayathumbathu | Mizhikalkkinnenthu Velicham |
| 2004 | Vismayathumbathu | Etho Kaliyarangin |
| 2004 | Rain Rain Come Again | Poovinnullil |
| 2004 | Rain Rain Come Again | Themma Themmaadikkaatte |
| 2004 | Rain Rain Come Again | Maaya MazhayaayMazhayaay |
| 2004 | Rain Rain Come Again | Kannaampothi |
| 2004 | Rain Rain Come Again | Nillu Nillu |
| 2004 | Perumazhakkaalam | Oonjal Aadinaal |
| 2004 | Perumazhakkaalam | Aalolam Poove |
| 2004 | Perumazhakkaalam | Kallaayikkadavathe |
| 2004 | Perumazhakkaalam | Meharuba Meharuba |
| 2004 | Vesham | Minnale minnale |
| 2004 | Vesham | Veshangal |
| 2004 | Vesham | Kelkkaathoru sangeetham |
| 2004 | Vesham | Veshangal |
| 2004 | Amrutham | Oh Sainaba |
| 2004 | Amrutham | Yamunayum |
| 2004 | Amrutham | Muthe Ninne Kandittu |
| 2004 | Amrutham | Ishtam Ishtam |
| 2004 | Symphony | Konchedi konchedi penne |
| 2004 | Symphony | Panimathiye |
| 2004 | Symphony | Raghuvamsha |
| 2004 | Symphony | Sukhamo |
| 2004 | Symphony | Panimathiye |
| 2004 | Symphony | A Symphonic Feeling |
| 2004 | Symphony | Ninnethedi |
| 2004 | Symphony | Chithramanikkaattil |
| 2004 | Kaazhcha | Kunje Ninakkuvendi |
| 2004 | Kaazhcha | Paandan Naayude |
| 2004 | Kaazhcha | Dup dup jaanaki |
| 2004 | 4 The People | Ninte Mizhimuna |
| 2004 | 4 The People | For The People |
| 2004 | 4 The People | Lajjaavathiye |
| 2004 | 4 The People | Lokaasamastha |
| 2004 | 4 The People | Annakkili |
| 2004 | Soumyam | Kailaasa |
| 2004 | Soumyam | Kannaadippuzha |
| 2004 | Soumyam | Chundari |
| 2004 | Soumyam | Innenthe Mounam |
| 2004 | Soumyam | Nilaavin |
| 2004 | Soumyam | Pandu pandoru |
| 2004 | Soumyam | Mizhithorna |
| 2004 | Thudakkam | Kochiyilum kandilla |
| 2004 | Thudakkam | Chirichenne Kudukkiya |
| 2004 | Thudakkam | Amme ennoru |
| 2004 | Thudakkam | Chirichenne Kudukkiya |
| 2004 | Manjupoloru Penkutti | Kashmera sandhye |
| 2004 | Manjupoloru Penkutti | Manju poloru penkanavu |
| 2004 | Manjupoloru Penkutti | Ithile Nee Enthe Vannilla |
| 2004 | Manjupoloru Penkutti | Kai niraye kadam tharumo |
| 2004 | Vellinakshathram | Kookuru Kukku Kurukkan |
| 2004 | Vellinakshathram | Pineapple Penne Chocolate Piecey |
| 2004 | Sathyam | Nee En Sundari |
| 2004 | Sathyam | Be Happy Man |
| 2004 | Sathyam | Visile Visile |
| 2004 | Maaraatha Naadu | Kadal |
| 2004 | Maaraatha Naadu | Dheem Thaka |
| 2004 | Koottu | Enthe Nin Pinakkam |
| 2004 | Koottu | Chulla Chulla |
| 2004 | Ayodhya | Chandanakkudathum naal |
| 2004 | Ayodhya | Daanaavari Mukundan |
| 2004 | Ayodhya | Ramadaanil nomb |
| 2004 | Ayodhya | Enthoru Kazhiveni |
| 2004 | Ayodhya | Hantha Daivame |
| 2004 | Pravaasam | Chandanappottu Thottu |
| 2004 | Pravaasam | Oru Vanchiyil Nammalonnaay |
| 2004 | Pravaasam | Utharam Muttaatha Veedu |
| 2004 | Udayam | Manasse Onnadangoo |
| 2004 | Udayam | Akkare Akkare |
| 2004 | Udayam | London Cell Phone Maniye |
| 2004 | Udayam | Muthukkuruvi |
| 2004 | Udayam | Asaami Kallasaamy |
| 2004 | Udayam | Paalathil Thattithatti |
| 2004 | Udayam | Rithame |
| 2004 | Udayam | Muthukkuruvi |
| 2005 | Makalkku | Mukilin Makale |
| 2005 | Makalkku | Chaanchaadiyaadi |
| 2005 | Makalkku | Paavakali |
| 2005 | Lokanaathan IAS | Ottokkaaraa |
| 2005 | Lokanaathan IAS | Chingakkaattum |
| 2005 | Lokanaathan IAS | Punchapadathe |
| 2005 | Lokanaathan IAS | Manjaadi |
| 2005 | Lokanaathan IAS | Saahira Saahira |
| 2005 | Ben Johnson | Iniyum Mizhikal |
| 2005 | Ben Johnson | Pettayaadi |
| 2005 | Ben Johnson | Sona sona |
| 2005 | Ben Johnson | Munpe Munpe |
| 2005 | Ben Johnson | Ben Johnson |
| 2005 | Naran | Minnedi Minnedi |
| 2005 | Naran | Thumbikkinnaaram |
| 2005 | Naran | Omal Kanmani ithile |
| 2005 | Naran | Ponnaaryan |
| 2005 | Naran | Velmuruka |
| 2005 | Twinkle Twinkle Little Star | Hey You |
| 2005 | Annorikkal | Priyadevathe |
| 2005 | Annorikkal | Velliyaranjaanam |
| 2005 | Annorikkal | Valayitta kai |
| 2005 | Annorikkal | Maattupponkal |
| 2005 | Annorikkal | Thaarakaraani |
| 2005 | Daivanaamathil | Ezhaam baharinte |
| 2005 | Junior Senior | Kunjippenne |
| 2005 | Junior Senior | Aasha aasha |
| 2005 | Junior Senior | Manchaadikunnum mele |
| 2005 | Junior Senior | Naattumaavin |
| 2005 | Junior Senior | Enikkinnu venam |
| 2005 | Junior Senior | Thennale |
| 2005 | Nottam | Melle |
| 2005 | Nottam | Mayangippoyi |
| 2005 | Thanmaathra | Mele vellithingal |
| 2005 | Thanmaathra | Ithaloornu veena |
| 2005 | Thanmaathra | Mindaathedi |
| 2005 | Thanmaathra | Kaattru Veliyidai Kannamma |
| 2005 | Udayanaanu Thaaram | Udayanaanu thaaram |
| 2005 | Udayanaanu Thaaram | Karale karalinte |
| 2005 | Udayanaanu Thaaram | Parayaathe Ariyaathe |
| 2005 | Udayanaanu Thaaram | Penne En Penne |
| 2005 | December | Snehathumpi |
| 2005 | December | Niramaanam |
| 2005 | December | Irulin kayangalil |
| 2005 | December | Oru Swapnam |
| 2005 | December | Kadumthudi |
| 2005 | December | Alakadalin Alakalil |
| 2005 | Udayon | Chiri chirichal |
| 2005 | Thommanum Makkalum | Karppaka malare |
| 2005 | Thommanum Makkalum | Punyavan |
| 2005 | Thommanum Makkalum | Aadya raathri |
| 2005 | Thommanum Makkalum | Nerinazhaku |
| 2005 | Thommanum Makkalum | Vattolakkuda |
| 2005 | Ullam | Aadedi aadadedee |
| 2005 | Athbhuthadweepu | Chakkaramaavinte |
| 2005 | Athbhuthadweepu | Shyaamamohini Premayaamini |
| 2005 | Athbhuthadweepu | Oridathoridath |
| 2005 | Hridayathil Sookshikkaan | Kaattaayi |
| 2005 | Hridayathil Sookshikkaan | Kuttanattile Karuthapen |
| 2005 | Hridayathil Sookshikkaan | Achante ponnumole |
| 2005 | Hridayathil Sookshikkaan | Enikkaanu Nee |
| 2005 | Hridayathil Sookshikkaan | Sandhyayaam Kadalile |
| 2005 | Hridayathil Sookshikkaan | Achante Ponnu |
| 2005 | Raappakal | Yadu Hridayam |
| 2005 | Raappakal | Pokaathe Kariyilakatte |
| 2005 | Raappakal | Thankamanassu |
| 2005 | Raappakal | Kadha Kadha |
| 2005 | By the People | Malare |
| 2005 | By the People | Asthale |
| 2005 | By the People | Vasco |
| 2005 | By the People | Rock me |
| 2005 | By the People | Oh Laila |
| 2005 | By the People | Na na |
| 2005 | By the People | Malare |
| 2005 | Boy Friend | Vennilaa |
| 2005 | Boy Friend | Yo Yo Payya |
| 2005 | Boy Friend | Ramzan Nilaavotha |
| 2005 | Aandavan | Aandava |
| 2005 | Izhra | Iravupol |
| 2005 | Izhra | Thennithenni |
| 2005 | Izhra | Vellithinkal Vilakkanayunnu |
| 2005 | Izhra | Mai Mai Maina |
| 2006 | Parayaam | Tik Tik Tik Nee Thottappol |
| 2006 | Parayaam | Enikku Nin Manasinte |
| 2006 | Parayaam | Njan Njan Parayaam |
| 2006 | Parayaam | Enikku Paaduvaan |
| 2006 | Parayaam | Thullithulli Nadakkana |
| 2006 | Lion | Sundari |
| 2006 | Lion | Chirimani |
| 2006 | Lion | Sundari Onnu Parayoo |
| 2006 | Thuruppugulaan | Nee Pidiyana |
| 2006 | Thuruppugulaan | Alakadalilu |
| 2006 | Thuruppugulaan | Thuruppu Gulaan |
| 2006 | Raashtram | Puthuvasantham |
| 2006 | Raashtram | Oru Kodi Mangalam |
| 2006 | Balram v/s Tharadas | Neelathadaakangalo |
| 2006 | Raavanan | Chirakulla Cheruppam |
| 2006 | Pulijanmam | He He |
| 2006 | Pulijanmam | Vazhanam Vazhenam |
| 2006 | Pulijanmam | Nallaariyaam |
| 2006 | Mahaasamudram | Chandirane Kayyileduthu |
| 2006 | Mahaasamudram | Maanmizhippoovu |
| 2006 | Mahaasamudram | Kadalu Chirichenu |
| 2006 | Mahaasamudram | Kando Kando |
| 2006 | Ennittum | Veedellam |
| 2006 | Ennittum | Chellamani |
| 2006 | Ennittum | Pada pedichu |
| 2006 | Ennittum | Swarna meghame |
| 2006 | Ennittum | Oru Nooraashakal |
| 2006 | Photographer | Poompuzhayil |
| 2006 | Photographer | Vasantharaavil |
| 2006 | Photographer | Pulchaadi |
| 2006 | Photographer | Chandrikaaraavu Polum |
| 2006 | Photographer | Enthe kannanu |
| 2006 | Photographer | Kadalolam Novukalil |
| 2006 | Ekaantham | Kayyethum Doore |
| 2006 | Palunku | Ettu Vatta Kettum |
| 2006 | Palunku | Pottu Thotta |
| 2006 | Mouryan | Kadalolam Moham |
| 2006 | Mouryan | Pakalin Padivaathilkkal |
| 2006 | Mouryan | Vatta Vatta |
| 2006 | Mouryan | Arasaangam |
| 2006 | Mouryan | Thaippooyakaavadi |
| 2007 | Nivedyam | Kaayaampoovo |
| 2007 | Nivedyam | Hai Krishna |
| 2008 | Raathrimazha | Bhaasuri |
| 2008 | Raathrimazha | En nenjile |
| 2008 | Raathrimazha | Aalolam Kanmani |
| 2008 | Magic Lamp | Good Morning In Paris |
| 2008 | Magic Lamp | Kannimaavu Pootho |
| 2008 | Magic Lamp | Vaa Murukaa |
| 2008 | Magic Lamp | Olakkam |
| 2008 | Magic Lamp | Poomottinu |
| 2008 | De Ingottu Nokkiye | Hayyeda |
| 2008 | Of The People | Arthashasthram |
| 2008 | Of The People | Raajakumari |
| 2008 | Jubilee | Aaraanu Nee |
| 2008 | Jubilee | Piriyaathini Vayya |
| 2008 | Jubilee | Udayame Unaroo |
| 2008 | Jubilee | Shaarike Shaarike |
| 2008 | Jubilee | Piriyaathini Vayya |
| 2008 | Shalabham | Lekhe Chandralekhe |
| 2008 | Shalabham | Kadha Parayunna |
| 2008 | Shalabham | Meera Krishnakanhaiya |
| 2008 | Shalabham | Shalabhame |
| 2008 | Paarthan Kanda Paralokam | Vennilaa |
| 2008 | Paarthan Kanda Paralokam | Gokulapaala |
| 2008 | Paarthan Kanda Paralokam | Padavaalinu |
| 2008 | Kaalchilambu | Mukilazhake |
| 2008 | Kaalchilambu | Payyannur Pavithram |
| 2008 | Kaalchilambu | Iruvarum Koode |
| 2008 | Kaalchilambu | Payyannur Pavithram |
| 2008 | Bullet | Kilichundan Maampazham Pole |
| 2008 | Bullet | Ennum Pathinezhu Vayassu |
| 2008 | Sulthaan | Maa Mazha |
| 2009 | Kaavyam | Kunjunnikkavilil |
| 2009 | Kaavyam | Ponnoonjaal |
| 2009 | Kaavyam | Nirmaalyam Kanikandoru |
| 2009 | Kaavyam | Niram Niram |
| 2009 | Kaavyam | Dayavillaya |
| 2009 | Makante Achan | Ee Vennilaavinte |
| 2009 | Makante Achan | Himaval Swaami |
| 2009 | Moz & Cat | Kulir Manju |
| 2009 | Moz & Cat | Five Staru Randu |
| 2009 | Moz & Cat | Oru Koodanayaanoru |
| 2009 | Moz & Cat | Innu Kondu Theerum |
| 2009 | Moz & Cat | Thottaal Pookkum |
| 2009 | Madhyavenal | Swantham Swantham |
| 2009 | Puthiya Mukham | Yadukula Murali |
| 2009 | Puthiya Mukham | Thattum Muttum |
| 2009 | Puthiya Mukham | Picha Vacha Naal |
| 2009 | Puthiya Mukham | Rahasyamaay |
| 2009 | Puthiya Mukham | You are my Sweety Pie |
| 2009 | Puthiya Mukham | Kaanekkaane |
| 2009 | Robinhood - Prince of Thieves | Priyanu Matram |
| 2009 | Robinhood - Prince of Thieves | Parannu Vanna |
| 2009 | Robinhood - Prince of Thieves | Ponnalle |
| 2009 | Robinhood - Prince of Thieves | Jaalam Maayaajaalam |
| 2009 | Thathwamasi | Daivanindayil |
| 2009 | Thathwamasi | Thathwamasi |
| 2009 | Thathwamasi | Eesa Suthan Ayya |
| 2009 | Ividam Swargamaanu | Velutha Muthe |
| 2009 | Ividam Swargamaanu | Ividam Swargamanu |
| 2009 | Ali Imran | Sundara Swapnathil |
| 2010 | Body Guard | Machiyammakku |
| 2010 | Body Guard | Perillarajyathe Rajakumari |
| 2010 | Body Guard | Kozhi Chingaara |
| 2010 | Yugapurushan | Jaathibhedam |
| 2010 | Yugapurushan | Manju Malayilangu |
| 2010 | Yugapurushan | Oru mathavumanyamalla |
| 2010 | Yugapurushan | Kodi Kodi Adimakal |
| 2010 | Aagathan | Manjumazha Kattil |
| 2010 | Aagathan | Munthiri Poovin |
| 2010 | Aagathan | Oro Kanavum Vidarunnu |
| 2010 | Aagathan | Njan Kanavil Kandoru |
| 2010 | Drona 2010 | Anchi Konchaathedi |
| 2010 | Drona 2010 | Nakshathra Shobhayal |
| 2010 | Vinnaithaandi Varuvaayaa | Aaromale |
| 2010 | Ye Maaya Chesave | Aaromale |
| 2010 | Pullimaan | Mallipoo |
| 2010 | Pullimaan | Oh Vaname |
| 2010 | Pullimaan | Sadukudu |
| 2010 | Thoovalkkaattu | Naagamallika |
| 2010 | Thoovalkkaattu | Neram Nalla Neram |
| 2010 | Thoovalkkaattu | Pathinalam Raavil |
| 2010 | Thoovalkkaattu | Ninne Kandal |
| 2010 | Pokkiri Raja | Chenthengin Ponnilaneer |
| 2010 | Pokkiri Raja | Maanikyakallin |
| 2010 | Pokkiri Raja | Kettille Kettille |
| 2010 | Pokkiri Raja | Manikkinaavin Kothumbuvallam |
| 2010 | Nallavan | Pudichaachu |
| 2010 | Penpattanam | Nee Entethalle |
| 2010 | Neelaambari | Shambo shankara |
| 2010 | Neelaambari | Muthay manimuthay |
| 2010 | Neelaambari | Rama rama rama |
| 2010 | Neelaambari | Aambalinodo thamarayodo |
| 2010 | Neelaambari | Indraneelaraavil |
| 2010 | Neelaambari | Anuraadha |
| 2010 | Yakshiyum Njaanum | Ponmaane en allimulam |
| 2010 | Yakshiyum Njaanum | Thenundo Poove |
| 2010 | Yakshiyum Njaanum | Anuraaga Yamune |
| 2010 | Aathmakadha | Ponthaarakame |
| 2010 | Raamaraavanan | Hey Soorya |
| 2010 | Raamaraavanan | Oh Manomee |
| 2010 | Inganeyum Oraal | Malini Vana |
| 2010 | Kaaryasthan | Thenikkappuram |
| 2010 | Kaaryasthan | Mangalangal |
| 2010 | Kaaryasthan | Malayaalippenne |
| 2010 | Kaaryasthan | Onavillin |
| 2010 | Kaaryasthan | Krishna Krishna |
| 2010 | Four Friends | Oru Naal Annoru Naal |
| 2010 | Four Friends | Parayamo Rappadi |
| 2010 | Four Friends | Ente Chithira Thaamara |
| 2010 | Oridathoru Postman | Ottappettum Kuttappettum |
| 2010 | Holidays | Thaamara Vala |
| 2010 | Holidays | Pathinettazhakotha |
| 2010 | Holidays | Indumukhee Varumo |
| 2010 | College Days | Thumbippenne |
| 2010 | College Days | Vennilaavin Chirakileri |
| 2010 | College Days | Jaganu Jaganu Thaka |
| 2010 | Sahasram | Kanne Va |
| 2010 | Sahasram | Etho Ravil |
| 2011 | Payyans | Thennal Chirakundo |
| 2011 | Payyans | Kadha Parayaan |
| 2011 | Living Together | Om Kariye Ilaku Naage |
| 2011 | Living Together | Kuttikkurumba |
| 2011 | Living Together | Ragachandranariyathe |
| 2011 | Living Together | Paattinte Paalkkadavil |
| 2011 | Living Together | Saamarasa Ranjini |
| 2011 | Living Together | Mallikappoonkodiye |
| 2011 | Makeup Man | Karimukil |
| 2011 | Makeup Man | Aarutharum |
| 2011 | Makeup Man | Moolippaattum Paadi |
| 2011 | Christian Brothers | Karthaave |
| 2011 | Christian Brothers | Sayyaave |
| 2011 | Christian Brothers | Moham kondaal |
| 2011 | Christian Brothers | Kannum |
| 2011 | Urumi | Chinni Chinni |
| 2011 | Urumi | Aaro Nee Aaro |
| 2011 | Naadakame Ulakam | Pookkila Chithari |
| 2011 | Naadakame Ulakam | Thevaara Poomalayil |
| 2011 | Naadakame Ulakam | Vanamaali |
| 2011 | Orma Maathram | Poy Varoo Ponmakane |
| 2011 | Thejabhai And Family | Punchirikke Punchirikke |
| 2011 | Thejabhai And Family | Verum Naadakam Jeevithangal |
| 2011 | Thejabhai And Family | Pranayanilaa |
| 2011 | Aazhakkadal | Karayum Kadalum |
| 2011 | Aazhakkadal | Ponmeghathin |
| 2011 | Aazhakkadal | Kattamaram Karaykkaduthallo |
| 2011 | Mazhavillinattam Vare | Rabiya |
| 2011 | Mazhavillinattam Vare | Avatharam |
| 2011 | Mazhavillinattam Vare | Thannanna |
| 2011 | Mazhavillinattam Vare | Boom Boom |
| 2011 | Mazhavillinattam Vare | Kali Kali |
| 2011 | Mazhavillinattam Vare | Nilavinte |
| 2011 | Mazhavillinattam Vare | Ennikku Venam |
| 2011 | Ulakam Chuttum Vaaliban | Enthaanennu Chodikkalle |
| 2011 | Venicile Vyaapaari | Kaayal Karayil Ponnaaro |
| 2011 | Venicile Vyaapaari | Nizhal Maathram |
| 2012 | Asuravithu | Aashaamarathin Mele |
| 2012 | Second Show | Adipidi Chendaykku |
| 2012 | Second Show | Swapnam |
| 2012 | Second Show | Ee Raamaayana |
| 2012 | Thanichalla Njaan | Karalinte Koottile |
| 2012 | Mullamottum Munthirichaarum | Neeyo Neeyo Neeyo |
| 2012 | Sthalam | Kezha Kezhakke |
| 2012 | Puthiya Theerangal | Maarppeelikkaatte |
| 2012 | Puthiya Theerangal | Raajagopuram |
| 2012 | Puthiya Theerangal | Sindoorappottum |
| 2012 | Shikkaari | Niramulla Kanavukal |
| 2013 | Pratheekshayode | Kilikal |
| 2013 | Pratheekshayode | Vave |
| 2013 | Good Idea | Indradhanussin |
| 2013 | Good Idea | Pranayamadhuramaay |
| 2013 | Good Idea | Ee Pranayamorathisayam |
| 2013 | Good Idea | Day Oh |
| 2013 | Aaru Sundarimaarude Kadha | Ponnoonjaalil |
| 2013 | Aaru Sundarimaarude Kadha | Kannin Aayiram |
| 2013 | Aaru Sundarimaarude Kadha | Ask Me |
| 2013 | Camel Safari | Aaraaro |
| 2013 | Camel Safari | Halwa |
| 2013 | Camel Safari | Afreen |
| 2013 | Camel Safari | Sayyan |
| 2013 | Camel Safari | Kannum Kannum |
| 2013 | Camel Safari | Suruma |
| 2013 | Bicycle Thieves | Punchiri Thanchum |
| 2013 | Honeybee | Innalakale Thirike |
| 2013 | Blackberry | Oru Cheru Malarinu Maathram |
| 2013 | Blackberry | Viruthanaanu Njaan |
| 2013 | Vasudha | Neramaayo |
| 2013 | Vasudha | Sneham Orapoorva Raagam |
| 2013 | Cowboy | Thottittodaan Thonni |
| 2013 | Cowboy | Ulaka Vaazhkai Ullaasam |
| 2014 | Vasanthathinte Kanalvazhikalil | Thennale |
| 2014 | Swaaha | Snehathumpi Paadoo |
| 2014 | Vellivelichathil | Randu Pranaya Chandranaay |
| 2014 | Vellivelichathil | Bhaje Shehnai |
| 2014 | Vellivelichathil | Panamkiliye |
| 2014 | Avathaaram | Konchi Konchi Chirichaal |
| 2014 | Avathaaram | Njaan Kaanum Neram |
| 2014 | Little Superman 3D | Mulamthandenthino |
| 2014 | My Dear Mummy | Kozhi Koovunne |
| 2014 | My Dear Mummy | Chechiyamma Manassu |
| 2014 | My Dear Mummy | Bale Bale |
| 2015 | Female Unnikrishnan | Gopee Murali |
| 2015 | Female Unnikrishnan | Ayalathe |
| 2016 | Aadupuliyaattam | Vaalmuna Kannile |
| 2016 | Hello Namasthe | Kandukothiche |
| 2016 | Maayamaalika | Aadhiyil Naadhamay |
| 2016 | Maayamaalika | Pakalinte Ranthal |
| 2017 | Achayans | Kaanaachiraku Tharoo |
| 2017 | Kadamkadha | Theyyamthaara |
| 2017 | Nilaavariyaathe | Paalaazhi Polulla |
| 2017 | Nilaavariyaathe | Rama Rama |
| 2017 | Nilaavariyaathe | Payyaaram |
| 2017 | Onpathaam Valavinappuram | En Pranaya Sowandhigam |
| 2017 | Onpathaam Valavinappuram | Han Olavina |
| 2018 | Chaanakyathanthram | Etho Vazhithaarayil |
| 2018 | Sukhamano Daveede | Daveedamil Geetham Kelke |
| 2018 | Sukhamano Daveede | Kaatte Kaatte |
| 2018 | Sukhamano Daveede | Udukkaan Oru |
| 2018 | Premaanjaly | Saraswathi |
| 2018 | Premaanjaly | Bhrahmame Prapanchame |
| 2019 | Oru Nakshatramulla Aakasham | Mizhiyilpaathi Njan Tharaam |
| 2019 | Oru Nakshatramulla Aakasham | Manninte Manamulla |
| 2019 | Oru Nakshatramulla Aakasham | Paravayaay |
| 2019 | Pattabhiraman | Unni Ganapathiye |
| 2019 | Vaarthakal Ithuvare | Athramel Athramel |
| 2019 | Vaarthakal Ithuvare | Udaya Sandhyayil |
| 2019 | Vaarthakal Ithuvare | Oorenkum Santhosham |
| 2019 | Vaarthakal Ithuvare | Sneham Pakaraan |
| 2019 | Vaarthakal Ithuvare | Kelkkaam Thakiladikal |
| 2019 | Vaarthakal Ithuvare | Swapnam Thedaam |
| 2019 | Vaarthakal Ithuvare | Ammaanam |
| 2020 | Shyamaraagam | Thumburu Narada |
| 2020 | Shyamaraagam | Neeyen Nenchil |
| 2020 | Shyamaraagam | Guruvinodo |
| 2020 | Vellimanithaalam | Swarnathalikayumenthiyananju |
| 2020 | Vellimanithaalam | Ammayee Bhoomiyil Devaalayam |
| 2020 | Vellimanithaalam | Sanyaasi Kalla Sanyaasi |
| 2022 | Hridayam | Manasse Manasse |
| 2022 | Hridayam | Mukilinte |
| 2022 | Hridayam | Thathaka Theithare |
| 2022 | Hridayam | Minnalkodi |
| 2022 | Hridayam | Pottu Thotta Pournami |
| 2022 | Hridayam | Puthiyoru Lokam |
| 2025 | Narivetta | Minnalvala |
| 2026 | Revolver Rinko | |

As composer

| Year | Movie | Lyricist | Director |
|---|---|---|---|
| 1997 | Kaliyattam | Kaithapram | Jayaraj |
| 1997 | Kottapurathe Koottukudumbam | Kaithapram | Pappan Narippatta |
| 1997 | Karunyam | Kaithapram | A.K Lohithadas |
| 1997 | Desadanam | Kaithapram | Jayaraj |
| 1998 | Thalolam | Kaithapram | Jayaraj |
| 1998 | Kaikudunna Nilavu | Girish Puthenchery | Kamal |
| 1998 | Kattathoru Penpoovu | Kaithapram | Mohan Kupleri |
| 1998 | Ennu Swantham Janakikutty | Kaithapram | Hariharan |
| 1999 | Agnisakshi | Kaithapram | Shyamaprasad |
| 1999 | Udayapuram Sulthan | Kaithapram | Jose Thomas |
| 2001 | Theerthadanam | Kaithapram | G.R Kannan |
| 2002 | Neelakasam Niraye | Kaithapram | AR Kasim |
| 2010 | Rama Ravanan | Kaithapram | Biju Vattapara |

As director

| Year | Movie | Lyricist | Composer |
|---|---|---|---|
| 2012 | Mazhavillinattam Vare | Kaithapram | Deepankuran |

As actor

| Year | Movie | Lyricist | Composer | Director |
|---|---|---|---|---|
| 1987 | Swathi Thirunnal | Irayimman Thampi, Swathi Thirunal, Thyagaraja | M.B Sreenivasan | Lenin Rajendran |
| 1988 | Aryan | Kaithapram | Reghu Kumar | Priyadarshan |
| 1988 | Vaishali | ONV Kurup | Bombay Ravi | Hariharan |
| 1989 | Jagradha | - | Shyam | K.Madhu |
| 1990 | His Highness Abdulla | Kaithapram | Raveendran | A.K.Lohithadas |
| 1992 | Savitham | Kaithapram | Johnson | George Kithu |
| 1993 | Ammayane Sathyam | Kaithapram | M.G.Radhakrishnan, Vijay Shanker | Balachandra Menon |
| 1993 | Sopanam | Kaithapram | S.P.Venkitesh | Jayaraj |
| 1996 | Deshadanam | Kaithapram | Kaithapram | Jayaraj |
| 1996 | 19 April | S. Ramesan Nair | Raveendran | Balachandra Menon |
| 1997 | Sammanam | Kaithapram | Johnson | Sunder Das |
| 2001 | Theerthadanam | Kaithapram | Kaithapram | G.R Kannan |
| 2007 | Nivedyam | Kaithapram, Bichu Thirumala, Lohidadas | M.Jayachandran | A.K.Lohithadas |

*He has played the character of a classical or semi-classical singer/lyricsist in most of these films.
