= Unnikrishnan Namboothiri =

Indian film actor (1923–2021)

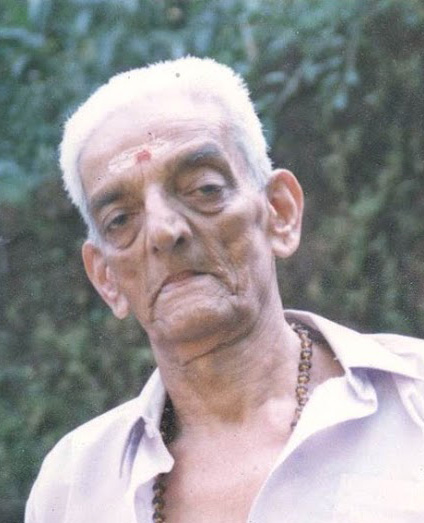
- Born: 19 October 1923; Payyanur, Madras Presidency, British India (Present day Kannur district, Kerala, India)
- Died: 20 January 2021 (aged 97); Payyanur, Kannur, Kerala, India
- Occupation: Actor
- Years active: 1996 – 2014
- Spouse: Leela Antharjanam
- Children: 4 (incl. P. V. Kunhikrishnan)
- Parents: Pulleri Vadhayarillathu Narayanan Namboothiri; Devaki Antharjanam
- Relatives: Kaithapram Damodaran Namboothiri ( Son-in-law)

Korom Pulleri Vadhayarillathu Unnikrishnan Namboothiri (19 October 1923 – 20 January 2021) was an Indian actor in Malayalam movies. He mainly handled comedy roles and grandfather roles. His role as Dileep's grand father in the Malayalam movie Kalyanaraman was well noted. P. V. Kunhikrishnan, a judge of the Kerala High Court is his son and the noted lyricist and music director Kaithapram Damodaran Namboothiri is his son-in-law. He died on 20 January 2021 at a private hospital in Kannur.

== Life and career ==
Unnikrishnan Namboothiri was born in a Nambudiri Brahmin family on 19 October 1923 to Pulleri Vadhayarillathu Narayanan Namboothiri and Devaki Antharjanam at Korom, Payyanur. He had five siblings.

He had his primary education from Payyanur Boys High School. He was married to Leela Antharjanam from Thekkumpurathu Mana in Cherpulassery in Palakkad district (died in 2009) and has 2 sons, Bhavadasan and Kunhikrishnan, and 2 daughters, Devi and Yamuna. His elder daughter, Devi, is married to Malayalam music director Kaithapram Damodaran Namboothiri. He resided at Payyanur in Kannur district. His son P. V. Kunhikrishnan, is a Judge of the Kerala High Court. His grandson Deepankuran is also a music director.

He debuted with the movie Desadanam in 1996. He played an important role in the film. The film won National award for best Regional film in the year 1997. His popular movies are Kalyanaraman, Desadanam, Mayamohini, Rappakal, Loudspeaker, Photographer, Pokkiri Raja, Madhuranombarakattu, Angene Oru Avadhikkalathu, Kaikudunna Nilavu and Kaliyattam. He acted with Rajinikanth in Chandramukhi, teamed up with Kamal Haasan for Pammal K. Sambandam and worked with Ajith Kumar in Kandukondain Kandukondain.

== Death ==
Unnikrishnan Namboothiri was diagnosed with pneumonia in January 2021. Following this, he was admitted to a private hospital in Payyanur and then at another hospital in Kannur. Later, he recovered from pneumonia but suffered fever and then got admitted again to hospital. He subsequently tested positive for COVID-19 during the COVID-19 pandemic in India and was admitted to the intensive care unit, where he died on 20 January, at age 97. He was cremated with full state honours.

== Partial filmography ==
=== Malayalam ===
- Desadanam (1996)... Sankaran's Father
- Oral Mathram (1997)
- Kaliyattam (1997)
- Kaikudunna Nilavu (1998)
- Angene Oru Avadhikkalathu (1999)... Parameswara Warrier
- Garshom (1999)... Bappu Haji
- Madhuranombarakattu (2000)
- Meghamalhar (2001)
- Kalyanaraman (2002)... Thekkedath Gopalakrishnan
- Sadanandante Samayam (2003)... Sadananda Menon
- Rappakal (2005)... Valiya Varma
- Udayon (2005)... Priest
- Note Book (2006)
- Photographer (2006)
- Loudspeaker (2009)... Muthassan
- Pokkiri Raja (2010)... Ashwati's grandfather
- Mayamohini (2012)... Bhaskaran Nair
- Vasanthathinte Kanal Vazhikalil (2014)
- Mazhavillinattam Vare (2012)

=== Tamil ===
- Kandukondain Kandukondain (2000) as Chandrasekhar
- Pammal K. Sambandam (2002) as Sambandham's grandfather
- Chandramukhi (2005)
