= Deepankuran Kaithapram =

Indian musician (born 1982)

- Born: 14 December 1982 (age 43); Kaithapram, Kannur, Kerala, India
- Education: Leeds Metropolitan University
- Occupations: Music director, classical vocalist, actor, playback singer, music therapist
- Years active: 1988–present
- Spouse: Saranya
- Children: Devang
- Website: deepankurankaithapram.blogspot.com

Deepankuran Kannadimana (born 14 December 1982), popularly known as Deepankuran Kaithapram, is an Indian musician who has often composed tunes for Mollywood projects. He is the son of popular Malayalam lyricist and musician Kaithapram Damodaran Namboothiri. He is also the Grandson of Unnikrishnan Namboothiri who is a noted actor in Malayalam movies.

== Personal life ==
Deepankuran was born to Kaithapram Damodaran Namboothiri and Devi Antharjanam in Kaithapram village in Kannur, District of Kerala and is currently residing in Vaduthala in Ernakulam District. He is the eldest son of Kaithapram Damodaran Namboothiri. He has a brother named Devadarshan Kannadi, who is a doctor and a singer too.

He is married to Devi Saranya who is the daughter of Parameswara Prasad Nampoothiri and Usha Antharjanam; they have one child named Devang. Deepankuran is also in the Director board of Swathi thirunal Kala Kendram (Music School) at Kozhikode and Ernakulam, which caters to more than 500 music students and aimed to create well-being through music therapy and practice.

Deepankuran's paternal grandfather, Kannadi Illath Kesavan Namboothiri, was a folk singer, a Carnatic musician and a violinist. Meanwhile, Deepankuran is a maternal grandson of Unnikrishnan Namboothiri. Deepankuran is a singer who has sung for various films including Desadanam, has hundreds of TV commercials, a lot of movie music directions, short films and lot of Devotional albums to his credit. In 1996, Deepankuran made his debut as playback singer in Desadanam under the guidance of his father who was the music director of the film.

== Career ==
Deepankuran started learning music when he was 6 years old and he got his Veda education from known Gurus (Teachers). He continued his education under well-known Music teachers including Sri. R.K.Ramdas, a well known musician in Kerala, and got the privilege to learn music from the great musicians like Kumara Kerala Varma, Neyveli Santhanagopalan, Seetharam Sharma, Kaithapram Vishwanathan Nambudiri, Madurai Ranganatha Sharma, Ajay Namboothiri, Thamarakkad Krishnan Namboothiri, S.V.S.Vijayam, Yogesh Sharma, Sri. Chenkotta Harihara Subrahmaniam, Naveen Namboothiri, and Jayaprakash (Hindustani classical music).

Deepankuran obtained a diploma in Carnatic music at Gandharva Mahavidyalaya Mandal. He got his Masters in Business Administration (MBA) in 2010, and he completed a Masters course in Music Production at Leeds Metropolitan University. He won the top ten positions of the Sonopedia Sound Design Competition, a worldwide online sound design competition. He has the experience of being a sound engineer for three years in home studio.

There are many advertisements, albums, devotional albums, television serials, short films, theme music works and feature films in his credit as a singer and music director. He has done hundreds of concerts with his father and his own as a Carnatic Vocalist. He has also participated in many of the Music Therapy (an emerging concept in medical field) sessions all over India with the team of Swathi Thirunal Kalakendram Trust, Kerala. He also does online teaching also for Carnatic Vocal students.

Deepankuran's mentor is Director Jayaraj. He started his career by singing "Naava Mukunda Hare" alongside Manju Menon in the film Desadanam. In 2013, Deepankuran reunited with his regular collaborator, Director Jayaraj, for the film Camel Safari. Deepankuran took the responsibilities of the music director. He composed songs such as "Suruma," "Afreen," "Kannum Kannum," and others. Deepankuran also lent his voice to the jingle Lulu Celebrate. In 2015, Deepankuran was the composer in his father's directorial venture Mazhavillinattam Vare which revolves around a Pakistani cricketer who meets his admirer during his visit to India. He got an opportunity to do signature music for the 2011 International Film Festival of India (IFFI) in Goa.

== Filmography ==
| Year | Movie | Language | Details |
|---|---|---|---|
| 1996 | Desadanam | Malayalam | Singer |
| 2000 | Sathyam Sivam Sundaram | Malayalam | Singer |
| 2000 | Life Is Beautiful | Malayalam | Singer |
| 2004 | 4 the People | Malayalam | Singer |
| 2004 | Soumyam | Malayalam | Singer |
| 2008 | Shalabam | Malayalam | BGM |
| 2008 | Mazhavillinattam Vare | Malayalam | Music Director |
| 2013 | Lisammayude Veedu | Malayalam | BGM |
| 2013 | Camel Safari | Malayalam | Music Director |
| 2014 | Vellivelichathil | Malayalam | Music Director |
| 2016 | Hello Namasthe | Malayalam | Music Director |
| 2017 | Kadam Katha | Malayalam | Music Director, BGM |
| 2018 | Oru Nakshathramulla Akasham | Malayalam | BGM |
| 2018 | Thattumpurath Achuthan | Malayalam | Music Director |
| 2018 | Namam | Malayalam | Music Director |
| 2019 | Saddam | Malayalam | Music Director |

== Awards and achievements ==
Deepankuran has got special jury award for Kerala television award 2017 for Music, for the programme Ragasootram.
