= Bhavana (disambiguation) =

Bhavana is a Sanskrit and Pali word (bhāvana) that means 'development' or 'cultivating' or 'producing'.

It (or variant Bhavna) is also a popular girls name and may refer to:

== People ==
- Bhavana (actress), (born 1986) Indian actress, born Karthika Menon
- Bhavana (Kannada actress), Indian actress, born Nandini Ramanna
- Bhavana Balakrishnan (born 1986), Indian television anchor
- Bhavana Balsavar, Indian film and television actress
- Bhavana Bhatt, Indian actress
- Bhavana Gawali, Indian politician from the Shiv Sena
- Bhavana Radhakrishnan (born 1961), Indian playback singer in Malayalam cinema
- Bhavana Rao, Indian actress and dancer, also known as Shikha
- Bhavna Pani, Indian actress
- Bhavna Limbachia, British-Indian actress

== Other ==
- Bhavana Upanishad, a Hindu text
- Bhavna (film), 1984 Indian film
- Bhavana (TV series), 2022 Indian Malayalam language soap opera

== See also ==
- Bhawana (disambiguation)
