= Rappakal =

- Directed by: Kamal
- Written by: T. A. Razzaq
- Produced by: Houli Pottoor
- Starring: Mammootty; Nayanthara; Sharada
- Cinematography: P. Sukumar
- Edited by: K. Rajagopal
- Music by: Mohan Sithara
- Distributed by: Swargachithra
- Release date: 24 June 2005
- Country: India
- Language: Malayalam

Rappakal is a 2005 Indian Malayalam-language film directed by Kamal and written by T. A. Razzaq. Mammootty, Nayanthara and Sharada appear in the lead roles.

== Synopsis ==
Rappakal tells the story of Krishnan, a deeply loyal domestic help who has dedicated his life to serving an aristocratic family and their matriarch, Saraswathiyamma. When the family’s extended relatives attempt to sell the ancestral estate for personal gain, Krishnan becomes the silent protector of the home and the family's legacy. It is a poignant drama that explores themes of unconditional loyalty, tradition, and the true meaning of family beyond blood relations.

== Cast ==
- Mammootty as Krishnan
- Nayanthara as Gauri
- Sharada as Saraswathiyamma (Voice dubbed by M Thangamani)
- Balachandra Menon as Devanarayanan
- Geetu Mohandas as Malavika
- Vijayaraghavan as Janardhanan
- Janardhanan as Sankaran Kutty Nair (Kuttiyar)
- Salim Kumar as Govindan
- Suresh Krishna as Sudhi
- Kalasala Babu as Shekharan
- P. Sreekumar as Balagopal
- Thara Kalyan as Urmila
- Unnikrishnan Namboothiri as Valiya Varma
- Balachandran Chullikadu as Mahendra Varma
- Subbalakshmi as Valiya Varma's Wife
- Kozhikode Sarada as Janu Amma
- Narayanankutty as Karavakaran
- Baburaj as Manikantan
- Lishoy as Aniyan Varma
- Shobha Mohan as Janardhana Varma's wife
- Seema G. Nair as Gauri's sister
- Dinesh Prabhakar as Rajappan
- Ottapalam Pappan as Palkkaran
- Vishnu Unnikrishnan as Boy with Aanaval (transl. Elephant tail bracelet)
- Resmi Boban
- Manka Mahesh
- Lavanya
- Poornima Anand as Renu
- Ajay Jayaprakash as young Krishnan
- Aashiq Abu as photographer

== Box office ==
The film was both commercial and critical success. It ran 100 days in theatres.

== Soundtrack ==
Rappakal

Soundtrack album by Mohan Sithara
- Released: 2 June 2005
- Recorded: 2005
- Studios: Revi's, Thrissur
- Genre: Feature film soundtrack
- Language: Malayalam
- Label: Manorama Music

Mohan Sithara chronology
Hridayathil Sookshikkan (2005)	Rappakal (2005)	Thanmathra (2005)

All songs were composed by Mohan Sithara and lyrics were written by Kaithapram.

Track	Song	Artist(s)	Raga(s)
1	"Thankamanassu"	P. Jayachandran	Neelambari
2	"Pokathe"	Afsal	Shivaranjani
3	"Yadhu Hrudayam"	K. S. Chithra, Madhu Balakrishnan	
4	"Kadha Kadha"	Vijay Yesudas, Jyotsna Radhakrishnan, Anwar Sadath, Dinesh Devdas, Asha Madhu	
5	"Thankamanassu"	Vidya Swarabhrath	Neelambari
6	"Yadhu Hrudayam"	Karaoke	
7	"Kadha Kadha"	Karaoke	
