= Sopanam (film) =

- Audio CD Cover
- Directed by: Jayaraj
- Screenplay by: Kaithapram
- Produced by: Appachan; Antony; Srinivasa Shenoy
- Starring: J. V. Somayajulu; Manoj K. Jayan; Chippy
- Cinematography: P. Sukumar
- Edited by: B. Lenin; V. T. Vijayan
- Music by: S. P. Venkatesh
- Distributed by: Saga Films
- Release date: 10 September 1993
- Running time: 145 minutes
- Country: India
- Language: Malayalam

Sopanam is a 1993 Indian Malayalam drama film directed by Jayaraj, starring J. V. Somayajulu, Manoj K. Jayan, and Chippy in lead roles. Scripted by Kaithapram Damodaran Namboothiri, this film tells the story of a singer who loves his teacher's daughter.

== Plot ==
Ananthu is a gifted singer who has not learned singing professionally. His heart longs for learning singing from Varma Thampuran. Varma likes him and accepts him as his disciple. Varma also teaches him that the characteristics of wise man are to be humble and have the right devotion to his teacher and god, also says what drives a man is his understanding and anger. Ananthu and Anju, Varma's daughter, fall in love. Varma discovers this and is angered. He asks Ananthu not to show his face again at his home. Ananthu takes it as a punishment and leaves. However, his departure disturbs Anju psychologically. Varma has stopped singing, because he is not able to find rhythm anymore. He is traveling with his daughters from one temple to another. On such an occasion, he sees Ananthu. Ananthu now is a famous singer and he learns of Varma's hardships. After seeing Anju's fate. He asks her hand in marriage from Varma. Varma from previous guilt and hope that his daughter will return to her health, agrees to it.

== Cast ==
- J. V. Somayajulu as Rajaraja Varma Thampuran (dubbed by Shammi Thilakan)
- Manoj K. Jayan as Ananthakrishna Warrier aka Ananthu
- Chippy as Anju Varma
- Oduvil Unnikrishnan as Puthumana Potti
- Kaviyoor Ponnamma as Sethulakshmi Varma
- Sankaradi as Marar
- M. S. Thripunithura as Temple priest
- Seena Antony as Unnimaya
- Bindu Panicker as Shobha Manoharan
- Kozhikode Narayanan Nair
- Maniyanpilla Raju as Manoharan Varma
- Kunchan as Kushini
- Kaithapram Damodaran Namboothiri as Ilayaraj
- Thilakan as Warrier Uncle
- V K Sreeraman as Illaya Varma Thampuran

== Soundtrack ==
Sopanam

Soundtrack album by S. P. Venkatesh
- Released: 1993
- Genre: Soundtrack
- Label: Johny Sagariga
- Producer: Saga Films

All music is composed by S. P. Venkatesh.

Songs
No.	Title	Lyrics	Singer(s)	Length
1.	"Aaradhaye Manamohana" (Raga - Vrindavana Saranga)	Kaithapram	Dr. K. J. Yesudas, Poornachandra Rao
2.	"Ashtapadi" (Raga - Mohanam)	Jayadeva	Dr. K. J. Yesudas
3.	"Deva Deva" (Raga - Mayamalavagowla)	Swathi Thirunal	T. N. Seshagopalan, Manoj Krishnan
4.	"Ksheerasagara Shayana" (Raga - Devagandhari)	Tyagaraja	Dr. K. J. Yesudas
5.	"Nagu Momu Galavani" (Raga - Madhyamavati)	Tyagaraja	Mano
6.	"Paavanaguru" (Raga - Hamsanandi)	Lalita Dasar	Dr. K. J. Yesudas, T. N. Seshagopalan
7.	"Pon Meghame" (Raga - Jog)	Kaithapram	K. S. Chithra, Chorus
8.	"Sadhinchene" (Raga - Arabhi)	Tyagaraja	Dr. K. J. Yesudas, T. N. Seshagopalan, K. S. Chithra, Manju Menon
9.	"Sarojadalanethri" (Raga - Sankarabharanam)	Syama Sastri	Dr. K. J. Yesudas
10.	"Slokam" (Raga - Mohanam)	Kaithapram	Dr. K. J. Yesudas
11.	"Sogasuga Mrudanga Talamu" (Raga - Shree ranjani)	Tyagaraja	Dr. K. J. Yesudas, K. S. Chithra, Manju Menon
12.	"Thaaranoopuram Charthi" (Raga - Mohanam)	Kaithapram	Dr. K. J. Yesudas, Manju Menon

== Awards ==
Nominee	Award	Song	Ref
K. J. Yesudas	National Film Award for Best Male Playback Singer	Ksheerasagara shayana	
K. S. Chithra	Kerala State Film Award for Best Female Singer	Ponmeghame	
P. Sukumar	Kerala State Film Award for Best Cinematography		
B. Lenin, V. T. Vijayan	Kerala State Film Award for Best Editor		
Seena Antony	Kerala State Film Award for Best Child Artist		
Prasad Colour Lab	Kerala State Film Award for Best Processing Lab		
