= Kottappurathe Koottukudumbam =

- Directed by: Pappan Narippatta
- Screenplay by: Rajan Kiriyath; Vinu Kiriyath
- Story by: Rajesh Narayanan
- Based on: Pondatti Sonna Kettukanum (Tamil)(1992)
- Produced by: Abdulla; Santhosh Kuttiyil
- Starring: Vijayaraghavan
- Cinematography: K. P. Nambyadhiri
- Edited by: G. Murali
- Music by: Kaithapram Damodaran Namboothiri; Mohan Sithara (score)
- Production company: A. S. Films
- Distributed by: Star Plus
- Release date: 1997
- Country: India
- Language: Malayalam

Kottappurathe Koottukudumbam (transl. Kottappuram joint family) is a 1997 Indian Malayalam-language comedy-drama film directed by Pappan Naripatta and starring Vijayaraghavan and Urvashi in the lead roles. It is a remake of the 1991 Tamil film Pondatti Sonna Kettukanum.

== Plot ==
A poor couple get their son married to a woman who is rich because of their ambitions of becoming wealthy. However, when her family spirals into poverty, they cast her out of the house.

== Cast ==
- Vijayaraghavan as Sahadevan
- Maniyanpilla Raju as Mahadevan
- Kalabhavan Mani as Vamadevan
- Vijayakumar as Jayadevan
- Janardanan as Bharathan Pilla F/o Sahadevan, Mahadevan, Vamadevan and Jayadevan
- K. P. A. C. Lalitha as Madhaviamma M/o Sahadevan, Mahadevan, Vamadevan and Jayadevan
- Urvasi as Sridevi teacher, W/o Sahadevan
- Kalpana as Chandrika, W/o Mahadevan
- Chandni Shaju as Meenakshi (Meenu), W/o Vamadevan
- Meera as Maya Menon, W/o Jayadevan
- Indrans as Balan
- Dharshna as Stella, House Maid
- Kalamandalam Chinnu as Sundhari Mani
- Rajan P. Dev as Bhaskara Menon, F/o Maya Menon
- Oduvil Unnikrishnan as Gopalan
- Baburaj as Antony
- A. C. Zainuddin as S. I.
- Paravoor Ramachandran as DIG Ramakrishnan

== Soundtrack ==
- "Enthishttamaanu" - KJ Yesudas
- "Mindaappenninte Karalile" - KS Chithra
- "Pennin Vaaku Kelkkena" - Sujatha Mohan, Biju Narayanan, Ambili, Pradip Somasundaran, RK Ramadas
- "Kaakkathampuraatti" - KS Chithra
- "Pennin Vaaku Kelkkenam (Female)" - Sujatha Mohan, Ambili
