= Bhawana (disambiguation) =

Bhawana is a city in Punjab, Pakistan

Bhawana or Bhawna may also refer to:

- Bhawana Tehsil, a tehsil of Chiniot District in Punjab, Pakistan
- Bhaona or Bhawna, traditional form of play from Assam, India

== People ==
- Bhawna Bohra, Indian politician
- Bhawna Dehariya, Indian mountaineer
- Bhawna Jat, Indian racewalker
- Bhawana Jha, Indian politician
- Bhawana Kanth, Indian aviator
- Bhawana Sharma, Indian handball player
- Bhawana Somaaya, Indian film journalist, critic and historian

== See also ==
- Bhavana (disambiguation)
- Bhawanathpur (Vidhan Sabha constituency), a constituency in India
