= Shalabam =

- Movie poster
- Directed by: Suresh Palanchery
- Written by: Madampu Kunjukuttan
- Produced by: Aseez Kadalundi, Alavi Ramanattukara, Rasheed Perumanna
- Starring: Sudheesh; Ramya Nambeeshan; Kaithapram
- Cinematography: M. J. Radhakrishnan
- Music by: Kaithapram; Score: Dipankuran
- Production company: Best Group
- Release date: 11 March 2008
- Country: India
- Language: Malayalam

Shalabam is a 2008 Malayalam film by Suresh Palanshery starring Sudheesh, Ramya Nambeeshan, Kaithapram, etc. The movie was produced under the banner of

== Plot ==
Hari is the only son of Kumaran who runs a local tea stall in a village. Meera is Hari's childhood friend who still loves to be with children. Meera is not married in spite of many proposals as she has yet to reach maturity.

Meera loves Hari, but Hari only saw her as a friend. Hari loves another girl Akhila and her father insists that he will marry her off only to a Government Employee. After Hari gets a Government job, he marries Akhila. The marriage of Hari makes meera unhappy and she becomes depressed.

The superstitious villagers started believing that Meera is mentally ill and its bad for the village. The villages threatens Meera and her mother and orders them to vacate the village. The movie ends when Meera finally becomes mature making her and her mother happy.

== Cast ==
- Sudheesh
- Ramya Nambeeshan
- Kaithapram
- Madampu Kunjukuttan
- Mala Aravindan
- Mamukkoya
- Rajan Padoor
- KPAC Lalitha
- Bindu Vaarapuzha
- Nilamboor Ayisha

== Songs ==
The movie had four songs all written and composed by Kaithapram Damodaran Namboothiri.

Songs
Song	Singers	Raga
Kadha Parayunna (Maanathe Kooda)	Kaithapram Damodaran Namboothiri	
Lekhe Chandralekhe	Deepankuran, Gayathri Varma	Mohanam
Meera Krishnakanhaiya	Deepankuran, Manjari	
Shalabhame	G. Venugopal	
