= Pappan Narippatta =

Indian film director

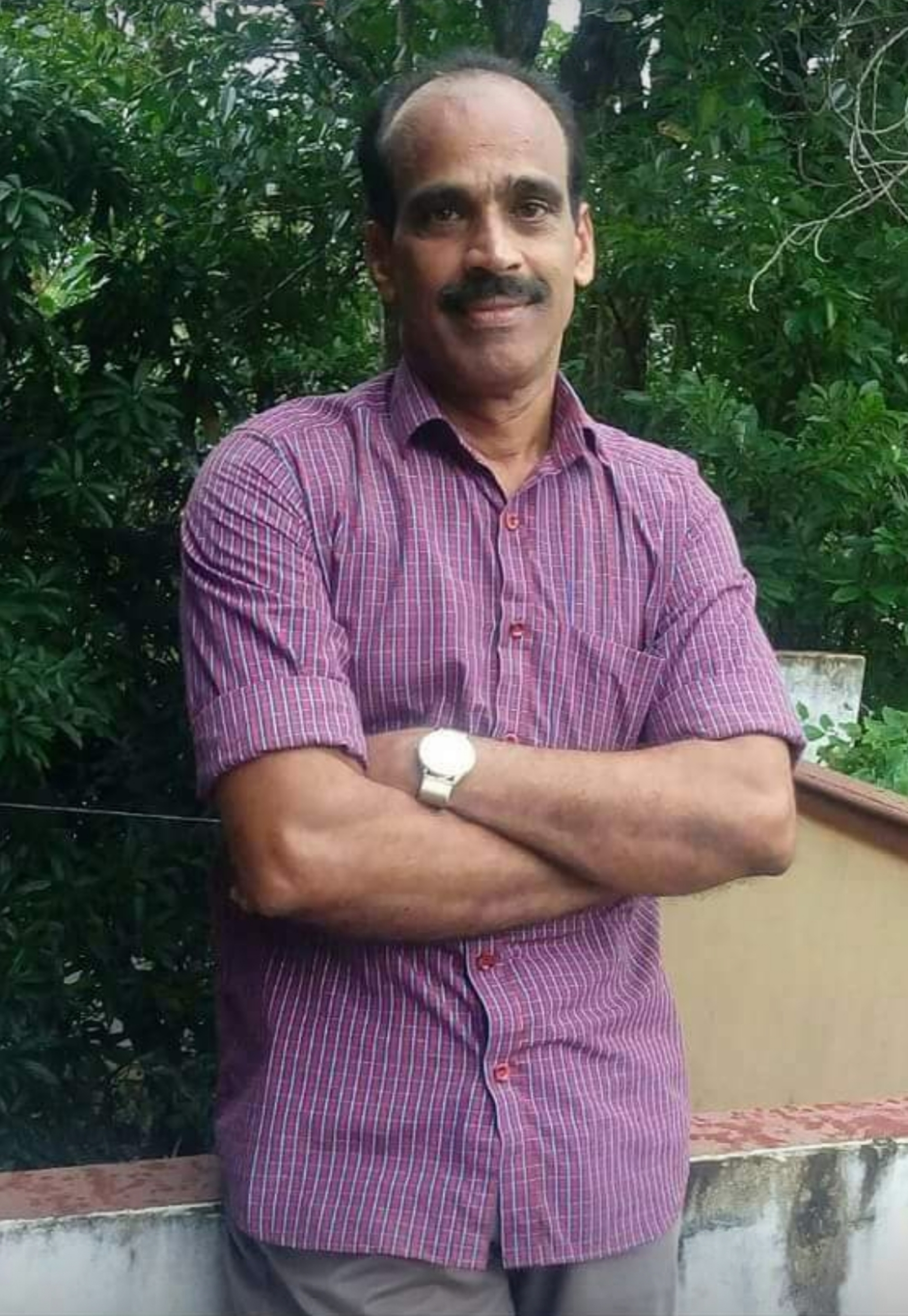
- Born: Padmanabhan; Narippatta, Vadakara, Kozhikode, India
- Occupation: Film Director
- Years active: 1982–1998, 2018–present
- Spouse: Veena
- Children: Sidharth, Arundhathi

Pappan Narippatta (Padmanabhan / Pappan T Namibiar) is an Indian film director from Narippatta, vadakara in Kozhikode district, Kerala. He made his directorial debut with the family entertainer Kottappurathe Koottukudumbam in 1997.

== Filmography ==
=== As director ===
Year	Title
2024	Vayassethrayayi
2018	Karinkannan
1998	Malabaril Ninnoru Manimaaran
1997	Kottappurathe Koottukudumbam

=== As associate director ===
Year	Title	Director
1996	Sathyabhamakkoru Premalekhanam	Rajasenan
1995	Aadyathe Kanmani	Rajasenan
1995	Aniyan Bava Chetan Bava	Rajasenan
1991	Kadinjool Kalyanam	Rajasenan

=== As assistant director ===
Year	Title	Director
1994	Vardhakya Puranam	Rajasenan
1992	Aayushkalam	Kamal
1992	Ayalathe Adheham	Rajasenan
1987	Kanikanum Neram	Rajasenan
1982	Panchajanyam	K. G. Rajasekharan
