= Aryan (1988 film) =

1988 Malayalam film by Priyadarshan

- Poster
- Directed by: Priyadarshan
- Written by: T. Damodaran
- Produced by: Century Kochumon
- Starring: Mohanlal; Ramya Krishnan; Sharat Saxena; M. G. Soman; Gavin Packard; Shobana
- Cinematography: S. Kumar
- Edited by: N. Gopalakrishnan
- Music by: Reghu Kumar (Songs); Johnson (Score)
- Production company: Cheers Films
- Distributed by: Century Films
- Release date: 26 August 1988
- Running time: 173 minutes
- Country: India
- Language: Malayalam

Aryan is a 1988 Indian Malayalam-language action crime film directed by Priyadarshan and written by T. Damodaran. The film stars Mohanlal, Ramya Krishnan, Sharat Saxena, Shobana, Sreenivasan, Gavin Packard, M. G. Soman, and Goga Kapoor. It was produced by Mohanlal and Century Kochumon through the company Cheers Films.

Aryan tells the tale of an underworld battle and family bonds through the main character Devanarayanan, who arrives in Bombay with nothing and rises to become a gangster in a powerful crime gang.

Mohanlal won the Kerala State Film Award – Special Jury Award for his performance in the film. The film was dubbed in Hindi as Aaryan Mera Naam. Aryan and was remade in Tamil as Dravidan (1989), in Telugu as Ashoka Chakravarthy (1989), and in Kannada as Chakravarthy (1990). Saxena reprised his role in all the versions.

== Plot ==
The film opens with a flashback in which Devanarayanan (Devan) is a Brahmin priest from Kerala who is the breadwinner for his impoverished family. He is in love with Aswathy, but her corrupt father, Govindan Nair, opposes their relationship. Devan is also at odds with Arumukhan, a corrupt local businessman. Problems go from bad to worse Arumukhan and Govindan Nair, with the help of Inspector Chandrappan, falsely accuse Devanarayanan of stealing thiruvabharana (Deity's ornaments) from the local temple. Chandrappan arrests Devan and thrashes him in front of the villagers and his family, who beg him to stop. Devan is taken to jail. Once Devan is out of jail, his father disowns Devan, believing him guilty of the theft, and Devan is forced to leave his village.

In the present day, Devan lives in Bombay with Kunjali and his daughter Sainaba, who runs a tea shop. The city is terrorized by a thug named Martin and his gang. One day, Martin thrashes Devan and steals his necklace. However, Devan retaliates by defeating Martin in a fighting match later that day. Devan soon becomes involved in the underworld, and he becomes the trusted aide of ageing crime boss Kareem, who had lost his wife, brother, and uncle in an underworld gang war decades ago. Sainaba is in love with Kareem's only son.

While on a mission for Kareem, Devan is taken hostage by Majeed Khan and his gang, who beat Devan until he is unconscious. When Devan wakes up, he finds Kareem and Nirmala, another member of Kareem's gang, tending to his wounds.Devan soon heals with Nirmala’s help. Kareem and his secretary, Nair, persuade Devan to kill Majeed Khan.

Devan and Nirmala soon fall in love. Devan tells Nirmala about the humiliation he faced while on trial for the theft of the thiruvabharana. Meanwhile, Kareem finds out about his son's relationship with Sainaba and rebukes him. He then orders his gang to attack Kunjali and Sainaba, but Devan intervenes. Nair sees this and turns against Devan. Devan and Nair engage in a fight, which ends with Nair fleeing in fear. Kunjali then hits Sainaba after finding out about her relationship with Kareem's son, but Devan comforts her. Kareem threatens to kill Devan. In response, Devan points a gun at Kareem and details his reasons for defending Kunjali and Sainaba. Kunjali also confronts Kareem for the attack. Devan convinces Kareem and Kunjali to allow Sainaba to marry Kareem's son.

At a party among Kareem's gang and the city police officers, Kareem is arrested after being reported by Nair, who is jealous of the attention Kareem is paying Devan. Devan then blackmails the arresting officers using footage of the officers engaging with Kareem's gang, and Kareem is released. Nair joins Majeed Khan's rival gang. Sainaba, Kareem's son, and Kunjali, are shot dead by Majeed Khan, Nair, and their henchmen during the Holi celebrations. This influences Kareem to become more religious and leave his criminal life.

Majeed Khan and Nair plan to leave Bombay, but Devan kills them. Devan is sentenced to five years in prison. After he is released, Devan and Nirmala move to Kerala. When Devan returns to his village, his father is angry at his return. Devan's mother then angrily tells him to leave.

With the help of Nirmala and Sakhavu Karunan, his politician friend, Devan gathers Arumukhan, Govindan Nair, Inspector Chandrappan, Adv Radhakrishnan, and the corrupt high priest of the temple. He demands that the men who framed him confess his innocence to his family. Angry, Devan storms out of the house. Ashwathy visits Devan and says that her husband, Adv Radhakrishnan, is innocent. Rather than punishing the men who framed him, Devan decides to let them go for Ashwathy's sake. He then introduces Ashwathy and Nirmala to each other.

Later, Devan shows Nirmala a mansion he used to live in and says he dreams of living there again with her. Nirmala suggests Devan gets his mother's approval first. Sakhavu Karunan soon arrives, stating that he was searching for Devan. Devan tells him that there's no need as he's forgiven the men who framed him. Karunan accuses Devan of being in cahoots with them, but Devan shrugs off his remarks and leaves. Back in the village, Devan invites his parents and sisters to live in the mansion with him and Nirmala.

At the mansion, Devan finds Nirmala held hostage by Majeed Khan and Nair, who have assaulted her. It is revealed that Majeed Khan and Nair survived Devan's attempt to murder them. Devan pays the ransom to free Nirmala but is shot by Majeed Khan. A fight ensues, and Devan suffocates Nair and shoots Khan, finally killing him. Nirmala also dies, leaving Devan speechless and devastated. The film ends with a furious Devan screaming at a judge for having been imprisoned under fabricated accusations.

== Cast ==
- Mohanlal as Devanarayanan Namboothiri / Devan, a Brahmin priest-turned-gangster
- Ramya Krishnan as Nirmala / Nimmi, Devan's girlfriend
- Shobhana as Aswathy, Devan's former girlfriend
- Sharat Saxena as Majeed Khan, the main antagonist and a powerful underworld don in Mumbai
- Goga Kapoor as Kareem Seth, an aged powerful underworld don in Mumbai
- Kundara Johny as Nair, the secondary antagonist and ex-secretary to Kareem, later Majeed Khan's henchman
- Sreenivasan as 'Sakhavu' Karunan, an ambitious politician
- M. G. Soman as Arumukhan, the villainous local businessman
- Innocent as Govindan Nair, Aswathy's corrupt father
- Maniyanpilla Raju as Adv. Radhakrishnan, Aswathy's husband and Govindan's son-in-law
- Sukumari as Thampuratti, Devan's mother
- Thikkurissy Sukumaran Nair as Namboothiri Thampuran, Devan's father
- Kuthiravattam Pappu as Hassan
- Balan K. Nair as Kunjali
- Monisha as Sainaba/Sainu, Kunjali's daughter
- Gavin Packard as Martin, a menacing local thug
- Priya as Subhadra, Devan's younger sister
- Sithara as Dhathrikutty, Devan's youngest sister
- Sreenath as Unnikrishnan, Dhathrikutty's husband and Devan's brother-in-law
- C.I. Paul as Inspector Chandrappan, a corrupt police officer and Aramukhan's accomplice
- Kaithapram Damodaran Namboothiri as Oikyan, Devan's 'Guru'
- Dinesh Kaushik as Henchman
- Milind Gawali as Salim, Kareem's son and Sainaba's husband
- Bob Christo as Tony, a Goon

== Soundtrack ==
The music was composed by Raghu Kumar and the lyrics were written by Kaithapram.

No.	Song	Singers	Lyrics	Length (m:ss)
1	"Om Jai Jagadeesh Hare"	Sujatha Mohan	Kaithapram	01:09
2	"Ponmuraliyoothum"	M. G. Sreekumar, Sujatha Mohan	Kaithapram	03:33
3	"Shaanthimanthram Theliyum"	Kaithapram, M. G. Sreekumar, Sujatha Mohan	Kaithapram	05:53

== Box office ==
The film was a commercial success. It ran for over 100 days in theatres.

== Remake ==
Aryan was later remade in Tamil as Dravidan (1989) by Suresh Balaje, with Sathyaraj playing the lead role. It was also remade in Telugu as Ashoka Chakravarthy (1989) starring Nandamuri Balakrishna and in Kannada as Chakravarthy (1990) starring Ambareesh.
