= Theerthadanam =

2001 film by B. Kannan

Theerthaadanam
- Directed by: G. R. Kannan
- Written by: M. T. Vasudevan Nair
- Produced by: Bose Varghese
- Starring: Jayaram; Suhasini Maniratnam; Ponnamma Babu; Sreelatha Namboothiri
- Cinematography: M. J. Radhakrishnan
- Edited by: A. Sreekar Prasad
- Music by: Kaithapram Damodaran Namboothiri
- Production company: Chembakasseril Productions
- Distributed by: Sree Mookambika Films
- Release date: 12 October 2001
- Country: India
- Language: Malayalam

Theerthadanam (transl. Pilgrimage) is a 2001 Indian Malayalam-language directed by G. R. Kannan and written by M. T. Vasudevan Nair based on his story Vanaprastham. The film stars Jayaram and Suhasini Maniratnam. The film met with critical acclaim. It was selected to be screened in 18 International Film Festival, which is a record at that time. Suhasini Maniratnam and K. S. Chithra got Kerala State Film Awards for their works in the movie

== Plot ==
The story of an old man and his student reunited after 36 years.

== Cast ==
- Jayaram as Karunakaran
- Suhasini as Vinodini K. S. (voice dubbed by Thankamani)
- Monica as Young Vinodini
- Ponnamma Babu as Vinodini's Mother
- Kuttyedathi Vilasini as Parukutti
- Rachana Narayanankutty as Vinodini's friend
- Beeyar Prasad as Narayanan
- K. Kaladharan as Swami
- Master Kannan
- Master Sreeram
- Master Vignesh as Kannan
- P. J. Radhakrishnan as Pattaru
- Raj Mohan
- Swapna Ravi as Bhanumathi

== Awards ==
Kerala State Film Awards 2001

- Best Actress - Suhasini Maniratnam
- Best Female Playback Singer - K. S. Chithra ("Mooli Mooli")
- Best Dubbing Artist - Thankamani
- Special Jury Award - Jayaram
