= Shikaari =

1979 novel by Yeshwanth Chittala

- Author: Yeshwanth Chittala
- Language: Kannada
- Genre: Novel
- Published: 1979 Manoohar Granthamaala, Dharwad
- Publication place: India
- Media type: Print (Paperback & Hardback)
- Pages: 264
- Preceded by: Mooru darigalu
- Followed by: Purushottama

Shikaari is psychological thriller novel written by Yashwant Vithoba Chittal. The book shikaari is considered as one of the finest novels written in Kannada. This novel related corporate workplace in India. Shikari tells the story of Nagnath, a migrant from north Karnataka who has risen to a high-ranking position in a chemicals corporation in Bombay.
