= Bhavana Radhakrishnan =

Indian musicologist and music educator

- Born: T.M Bhavana; 28 July 1961 (age 65); Alanallur (gram panchayat), Palakkad
- Occupation: Playback singer
- Years active: 1991-present
- Spouse: Dr. C G Radhakrishnan Namboothiri
- Children: Arun, Anagha

Bhavana Radhakrishnan (born 28 July 1961) is a Carnatic singer and playback singer in Malayalam cinema. She received the 1997 Kerala State Film Award for Best Singer for the song "Ennodenthini pinakkam" in the film Kaliyattam.

She was awarded a doctorate in music by the University of Kerala. She is a music educator and currently working as associate professor in Carnatic music at SN College for Women's, Kollam. She is also known as a performer of devotional music.

== Filmography ==
The songs that she sang in films are :-

#	Song name	Film	Year	Singers
1	Thankavilakanamma	The Honourable Pankunni Nair	1991	MG Sreekumar, Bhavana Radhakrishnan, Baby Kavitha, Master Jayaram
2	Ennodenthini pinkkam	Kaliyattam	1997	Bhavana Radhakrishnan
3	Manassilenthe	Kaattathoru Penpoovu	1998	Bhavana Radhakrishnan, Sindhu
4	Nanda Kumaaranu	Chitrashalabham	1998	Bhavana Radhakrishnan
5	Oru Neela Megham	Varavaay	2000	Bhavana Radhakrishnan
6	Orilakkumbil	Venalkkaalam	2003	Bhavana Radhakrishnan
7	Loka samastha sughino	Alexander the Great	2010	MG Sreekumar, Bhavana Radhakrishnan
