= Kaliyattam =

- VCD cover
- Directed by: Jayaraj
- Written by: Balram Mattannur
- Based on: William Shakespeare's Othello
- Produced by: K. Radhakrishnan
- Starring: Suresh Gopi; Lal; Biju Menon; Manju Warrier
- Cinematography: M. J. Radhakrishnan
- Edited by: B. Lenin; V. T. Vijayan
- Music by: Songs: Kaithapram; Score: C.Rajamani
- Production company: Jayalakshmi Films
- Distributed by: Surya Cine Arts
- Release date: 22 August 1997
- Running time: 130 minutes
- Country: India
- Language: Malayalam

Kaliyattam (English: The Play of God) is a 1997 Indian Malayalam-language tragedy film directed by Jayaraj. It stars Suresh Gopi, Lal (in his acting debut), Biju Menon and Manju Warrier. The film is an adaptation of William Shakespeare's play Othello, set against the backdrop of the Theyyam performance of Kerala. The screenplay is written by Balram Mattannur. Suresh Gopi plays Kannan Perumalayan, the equivalent to Othello, Lal plays Paniyan, the equivalent to Iago, Manju Warrier plays Thamara, the Desdemona version, and Biju Menon plays Kanthan, Cassio's role. Suresh Gopi's role as Kannan Perumalayan was critically acclaimed.

In 1998, Suresh Gopi received the National Film Award for Best Actor and Kerala State Film Award for Best Actor for his critically acclaimed performance. Jayaraj won the Best Director Award for Kaliyattam. The film was a critical and commercial success.

== Plot ==
This is an adaptation of Shakespeare's Othello, revolving around Kannan Perumalayan, a Theyyam artist who corresponds to Othello, and Thamara, the beautiful daughter of the village head. While Unni Thampuran hates Kannan because he had a crush on Thamara, and Paniyan, who plays a Komali, covets the role of Theechamundi which Perumalayan holds. Paniyan plants the seeds of doubt about Thamara's fidelity in Kannan's mind, making him suspect that Thamara and his assistant, Kanthan, are having an affair. Kannan spots a silk robe which he had presented to Thamara in Kanthan's hands.

Kannan, out of grief and anger, takes Thamara's life by suffocating her with a pillow. On the same night, Paniyan plans to get Kanthan killed by Unni Thampuran. But the plan goes awry, and Thamburan is killed. Amidst these events, Kannan is told of his mistake by Paniyan's wife, Cheerma, before Paniyan murders her. Kannan overpowers Paniyan, crushing his legs with a stone, and leaving him to live the rest of his life crippled. Kannan Perumalayan gives the ''Perumalayan'' role to Kanthan and commits suicide in the Theyyam ritual fire.

== Cast ==
- Suresh Gopi as Kannan Perumalayan (Othello)
- Manju Warrier as Thamara (Desdemona)
- Lal as Paniyan (Iago)
- Biju Menon as Kanthan (Cassio)
- Bindu Panicker as Cheerma (Emilia)
- Narendra Prasad as Thamburan (Brabantio)
- E. A. Rajendran as Unni Thampuran (Roderigo)

== Soundtrack ==
Kaliyattam

Soundtrack album by Kaithapram
- Released: 22 August 1997
- Studio: Music City, Kozhikode
- Genre: Film soundtrack
- Length: 36:32
- Label: Johny Sagariga; T-Series

Kaithapram chronology
Thattakam (1997)	Kaliyattam (1997)	Ennu Swantham Janakikutty (1998)

The music for this movie was composed, as well as lyrics written, by Kaithapram Damodaran Namboothiri.

Track	Song	Playback	Raga
1	"Vannathi Puzhayude"	K. J. Yesudas	Madhyamavathi
2	"Velikku Veluppaankaalam"	K. J. Yesudas	Mohanam
3	"Ezhimalayolam"	Kaithapram	
4	"Sapamapa Magari"	Choir	
5	"Kathivanoor Veerane"	Kallara Gopan	Yamunakalyani
6	"Ennodenthinee Pinakkam"	Bhavana Radhakrishnan	Shahana
7	"Kathivanoor Veerane"	Sreeja	Yamunakalyani
8	"Ennodenthinee Pinakkam"	K. J. Yesudas	Shahana

== Awards ==
=== National Film Awards 1997 ===
- National Film Award for Best Director – Jayaraj
- National Film Award for Best Actor – Suresh Gopi

=== Filmfare Awards 1997 ===
- Filmfare Award for Best Director – Malayalam – Jayaraj
- Filmfare Award for Best Music Director – Malayalam – Kaithapram

=== Kerala State Film Awards 1997 ===
- Kerala State Film Award for Best Actor – Suresh Gopi
- Best Film with Popular Appeal and Aesthetic Value
- Best Music Director – Kaithapram
- Best Female Playback Singer – Bhavana Radhakrishnan

=== Kerala Film Critics Association Awards 1997 ===
- Best Actor – Suresh Gopi
- Best Supporting Actor – Lal
