= Desadanam =

- Directed by: Jayaraj
- Screenplay by: Madampu Kunjukuttan
- Story by: Sreekumar Arookutty
- Produced by: Jayaraj
- Starring: Mstr. Kumar; Vijayaraghavan; Mini Nair; Unnikrishnan Namboothiri
- Cinematography: M. J. Radhakrishnan
- Edited by: B. Lenin; V. T. Vijayan
- Music by: Kaithapram (songs); Mohan Sithara (background score)
- Production company: New Generation Cinema
- Distributed by: Shogun Films
- Release date: 31 October 1996
- Running time: 95 minutes
- Country: India
- Language: Malayalam

Desadanam (English: Journey to wisdom) is a 1996 Indian Malayalam language musical drama film directed by Jayaraj. It won the National Film Award for Best Feature Film in Malayalam. The story is about a young boy chosen to join a monastery. The film was a box-office hit.

== Plot ==
The plot revolves around the personal turmoil faced by the parents of a child who is to be inducted into priesthood by a monastery. The characters played by Vijayaraghavan and Mini Nair portray the pain of imminent separation from their only child.

The boy who led a carefree life until then has been identified as having a deep understanding of religious philosophy and scriptures at a very young age by the priests of a holy shrine. They request the family to induct the boy into priesthood to which the grandfather of the boy readily agrees, for he himself had aspirations of joining the shrine in the past. The parents, though not keen on parting with their child are compelled to give in because the elders of the family have given their word.

== Cast ==
- Master Kumar as Parameswaran aka Pachu
- Vijayaraghavan as Sankaran, Pachu's Father
- Mini Nair as Pachu's mother
- Satyabhama Pisharasyar as Mutthashi
- Unnikrishnan Namboothiri as Sankaran's father
- V. K. Sriraman as Madhavan
- Perangodu Chithrabhanu Namboodiri
- Neelakantan Namboodiri
- Madampu Kunjukuttan as Shastrikal
- Kaithapram Damodaran Namboothiri as Krishnan
- Soumya Unnikrishnan as Theethikutty

== Soundtrack ==
Desadanam

Soundtrack album by Kaithapram
- Released: 1 October 1996
- Language: Malayalam
- Label: Sargam Speed Audios; Satyam Audios
- Producer: Jayaraj

Kaithapram chronology
Desadanam (1996)	Karunyam (1997)

All the songs in the movie were well received. The music was composed by Kaithapram who himself wrote the lyrics and had a role in the movie too.

Track	Song title	Singer(s)	Raga
1	"Kaliveedurangiyallo"	K. J. Yesudas	Mohanam
2	"Yathrayayi"	K. J. Yesudas, Chorus	Shyama
3	"Engane Njan"	Sujatha Mohan	Arabhi
4	"Naava Mukunda Hare"	Manju Menon, Deepankuran	Bihag
5	"Vettakkoru Makan"	Prakash Chandran, Chorus	Mukhari
6	"Nanmayerunnoru"	Manju Menon	
7	"Neelakarmukil"	Manju Menon, Kunjanujathi Thamburatti	Arabhi
8	"Kaliveedurangiyallo"	Manju Menon	Mohanam
9	"Engane Njan"	K. J. Yesudas	Arabhi

== Box office ==
The film became commercial success.

== Awards ==
National Film Awards

- Best Feature Film in Malayalam - Jayaraj (director, producer)
- Best Child Artist - Mstr. Kumar
- Best Audiography - T. Krishnanunni

Kerala State Film Awards

- Best Director- Jayaraj
- Second Best Actress - Mini Nair
- Best Child Artist - Mstr. Kumar
- Best Male Playback Singer - K. J. Yesudas
- Best Cinematography - M. J. Radhakrishnan
- Best Sound Recordist - T. Krishnanunni
- Best Dubbing Artist - Venmani Vishnu

Kerala Film Critics Association Awards

- Best Film – Jayaraj (director)
- Best Director – Jayaraj
- Best Story – Sreekumar Arookutty
- Best Child Artist – Mstr. Kumar
- Best Cinematographer – M. J. Radhakrishnan
- Best Lyricist – Kaithapram
- Best Background Score – Mohan Sithara
- Best Male Playback Singer – K. J. Yesudas
- Best Female Playback Singer - Sujatha Mohan
