= Kaithapram Damodaran Namboothiri =

Indian lyricist and poet

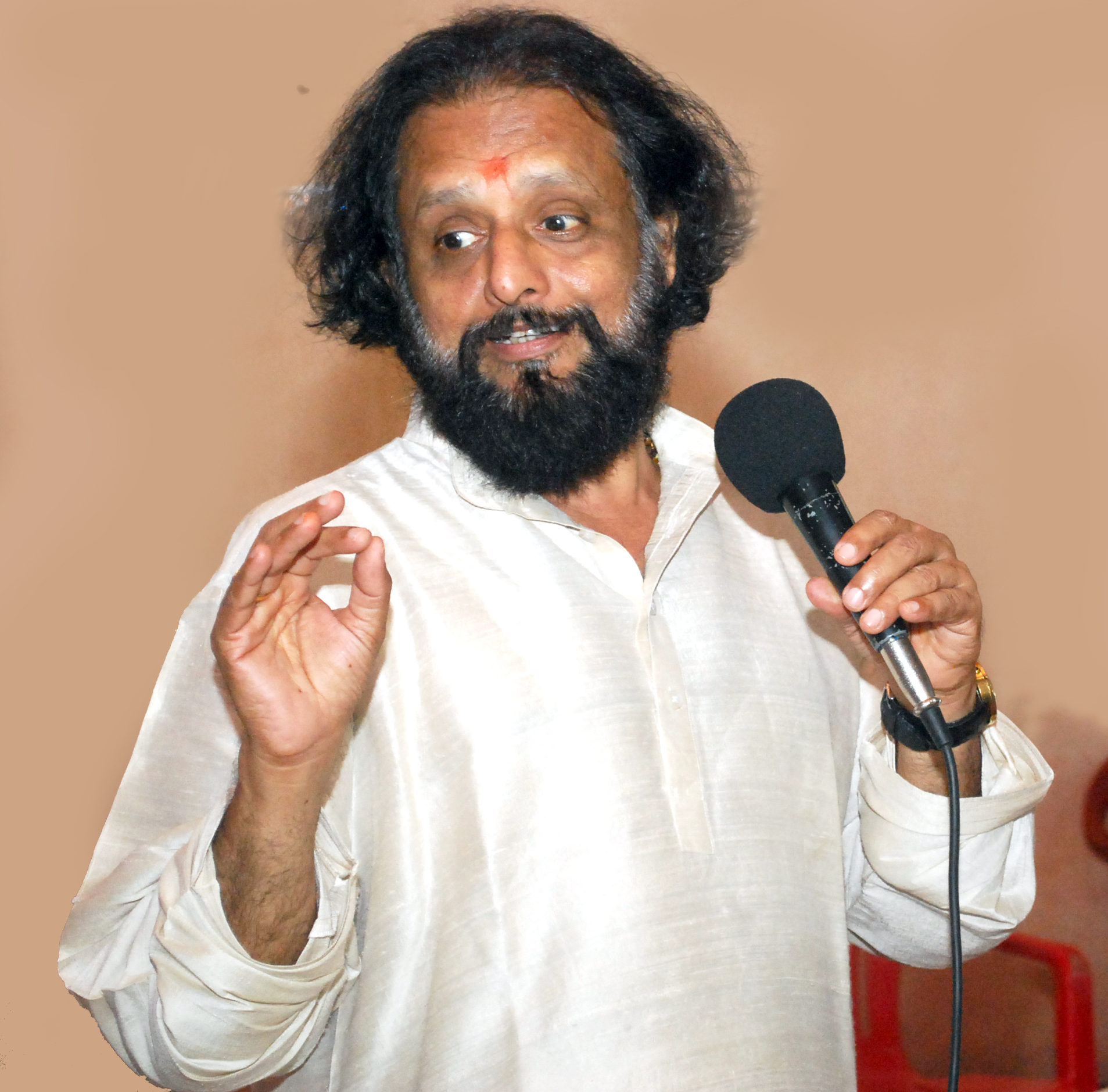
- Born: 4 August 1950 (age 76); Kaithapram, Kannur, Kerala, India
- Occupations: Lyricist; poet; music therapist; screenwriter
- Years active: 1985–present
- Works: Full list
- Spouse: Devi Antharjanam
- Children: 2 (including Deepankuran)
- Relatives: Kaithapram Vishwanathan Namboothiri (brother); Unnikrishnan Namboothiri (father in law); Deepankuran Kaithapram (son); Santhosh Mada (nephew); P. V. Kunhikrishnan (brother in law)
- Awards: Padma Shri; Kerala State Film Award; Asianet Film Award; Filmfare Award South; Mathrubhumi Literary Award

Kaithapram Damodaran Namboothiri, simply known as Kaithapram, is a Malayalam lyricist, poet, music director, actor, singer, screenwriter, music therapist and performer of Carnatic music. He debuted with the movie Ennennum Kannettante in 1986. He won the Kerala State Film Award for Best Lyricist two times. He was awarded India's fourth-highest civilian honour Padma Shri in 2021 by the Government of India for his contribution to the field of art.

== Life and career ==
Kaithapram Damodaran Namboothiri was born as the eldest son of Keshavan Namboothiri (popularly known as Kannadi Bhagavathar, a disciple of Chembai Vaidyanatha Bhagavatar) and Aditi Antharjanam in Kaithapram village in Payyanur Taluk of Kannur district of Kerala, on 4 August 1950. He currently resides in Thiruvannur in Kozhikode District. He has four siblings, the youngest of whom, Kaithapram Viswanathan, was also a popular Carnatic musician and music director. Kaithapram village is famous for maintaining old vedic traditions. He got his Veda education from his grandfather. Later on he continued his education under well-known gurus (teachers) including Pazhassi Thamburan (a descendant of Pazhassi Raja) and SVS Narayanan. He pursued his studies in acting and music at Natyagruha.

He is married to Devi Antharjanam who is the daughter of actor Unnikrishnan Namboothiri; they have two children, Deepankuran and Devadarshan. His elder son Deepankuran is a Music composer as well as singer who has composed Music for various films. Kaithapram Damodaran's youngest brother, Kaithapram Viswanathan, is a Malayalam cinema music director who runs the Sruthilaya Music School at Payyanur.

Kaithapram made his entry into Malayalam cinema as a lyricist for the song Devadundubhi Sandralayam in the film Ennennum Kannettante which was directed by Fazil and music composed by Jerry Amaldev and all of the songs become popular Since then he has written lyrics for more than 346 films. He has also acted in many films, including Swathithirunal, Aryan, His Highness Abdulla, and the film Theerthadanam, based on the story of famous Malayalam writer M.T. Vasudevan Nair. He has played the character of a classical or semi-classical singer in most of the films. The songs from Desadanam, his first film as a music composer, were a hit. The film Sopanam, directed by Shri Jayaraj, was based on a story and screenplay written by Kaithapram.

Kaithapram has established a position in the Malayali heart with his artistic renderings. He has written prose and poems which have won several awards, including a Harivarasanam Award in 2025.

As a lyricist, Kaithapram made songs with almost all major music composers of his time. But, most of his popular songs were composed by Johnson. The duo made songs for around 35 films, and most of them have superhit songs. He also made numerous songs with Mohan Sithara, Raveendran, Ouseppachan, S. P. Venkatesh, Vidyasagar, Jassie Gift and so on.

Shri Kaithapram is also the Managing Trustee of Swathithirunal Kala Kendram (Music School) at Kozhikode, which caters to more than 400 music students. He has received numerous awards from various government and cultural organisations in Kerala. He has popularised and promoted the application of music for therapeutic purposes through the Music Therapy Foundation. Many have benefited from the systematic music therapy sessions conducted all over Kerala.

== Awards ==
Civilian honours

- 2021 – Padma Shri

Kerala State Film Awards

- 1993 – Best Lyricist: Paithrukam
- 1996 – Best Lyricist: Azhakiya Ravanan
- 1997 – Best Music Director: Karunyam

Kerala Film Critics Association Awards

- 1990 – Best Lyricist: Innale
- 1992 – Best Lyricist: Kudumbasametham, Kamaladalam, Savidham
- 1996 – Best Lyricist: Sallapam, Desadanam
- 1997 – Best Music Director: Ennu Swantham Janakikutty, Kaliyattam
- 1998 – Best Lyricist: Agnisakshi, Ormacheppu
- 2002 – Best Lyricist: Yathrakarude Sradhakku
- 2010 – Best Lyricist: Holidays

Filmfare Awards South

- 1996 – Best Music Director: Desadanam
- 1997 – Best Music Director: Kaliyattam

Asianet Film Awards

- 2005 – Best Lyricist Award: Anandabhadram
