= Sargam =

Sargam may refer to:

- Swara, a way of assigning syllables to pitches (solmization) in Indian music
- Sargam (music), singing the notes of a musical composition
  - Sargam notes, the notes sung this way.
- Sargam (1950 film), a 1950 Indian Hindi-language family drama film by P.L. Santoshi
- Sargam (1979 film), a 1979 Indian Hindi-language film by Kasinathuni Vishwanath, starring Rishi Kapoor and Jayapradha
- Sargam (1992 film), a 1992 Indian Malayalam-language film by Hariharan, starring Vineeth, Manoj K. Jayan and Rambha
- Sargam (1995 film), a 1995 Pakistani film by Syed Noor starring Adnan Sami, Zeba Bakhtiar and Nadeem
- Uncle Sargam, a puppet character made by Pakistani puppeteer Farooq Qaiser

== See also ==
- Swara (disambiguation)
- Sa Re Ga Ma (disambiguation)
- Sarigam, city in Gujarat, India
- Sarigamalu, a 1993 Indian Telugu-language film
- Sarigamapadani, a 1994 Indian Tamil-language film
- Sarigama Viji, an Indian entertainer
