= Sa Re Ga Ma Pa Dha Ni =

Sa Re Ga Ma Pa Dha Ni is the vocalization in the sargam system (see sargam (music) and sargam notes) of the seven basic musical notes (sapta svara) of the octave in Indian classical music, equivalent to solfège's "Do Re Mi Fa Sol La Ti" in Western music.

Sa Re Ga Ma Pa Dha Ni may also refer to:

- Saregama, formerly known as The Gramophone Company of India/His Master's Voice/EMI, an Indian music record company, label and content producer for Indian film and television
- Sa Re Ga Ma Pa, a musical reality singing competition television franchise broadcast in multiple Indian languages, including:
  - Sa Re Ga Ma Pa Hindi (Hindi)
    - Sa Re Ga Ma Pa Championship
    - Sa Re Ga Ma Pa The Singing Superstar
    - Sa Re Ga Ma Pa The Next Singing ICON
    - Sa Re Ga Ma Pa L'il Champs, the children's version
      - Sa Re Ga Ma Pa Li'l Champs International
  - Sa Re Ga Ma Pa Lil Champs or Sa Re Ga Ma Pa Tamil Li'l Champs (Tamil)
  - Sa Re Ga Ma Pa Bangla (Bengali)
  - Sa Re Ga Ma Pa Kannada (Kannada)
  - Sa Re Ga Ma Pa Keralam (Malayalam)
  - Sa Re Ga Ma Pa Marathi (Marathi)
    - Sa Re Ga Ma Pa Marathi Li'l Champs
  - Sa Re Ga Ma Pa Punjabi (Punjabi)
  - Sa Re Ga Ma Pa Telugu (Telugu)
  - Sa Re Ga Ma Pa Seniors, the senior/adult version

== See also ==
- Swara (disambiguation)
- Sargam (disambiguation)
- Sarigam, city in Gujarat, India
- Sarigamalu, a 1993 Indian film
- Sarigamapadani, a 1994 Indian film
- Sarigama Viji, Indian entertainer
