= Eakantham =

- Cover of the film's script
- Directed by: Madhu Kaithapram
- Written by: Alankode Leelakrishnan
- Produced by: Antony Joseph
- Starring: Thilakan; Murali
- Cinematography: M. J. Radhakrishnan
- Edited by: Venugopal
- Music by: Songs: Kaithapram Viswanathan; Lyrics: Kaithapram Damodaran Namboothiri; Score: Johnson
- Production company: Rubens Media International
- Release date: 10 August 2006
- Country: India
- Language: Malayalam
- Budget: est. ₹35 lakhs

Eakantham (English: Loneliness) is a 2006 Indian Malayalam-language feature film directed by Madhu Kaithapram, who made his debut. The film stars veteran actors Thilakan and Murali. It tells the story of two brothers who suffer from isolation and loneliness in their old age. It received critical praise and won many awards including two National Film Awards and a Kerala State Film Award.

== Cast ==
- Thilakan as Achutha Menon
- Murali as Ravunni Menon
- Salim Kumar as Velayudhan
- Manoj K. Jayan as Dr. Sunny
- Madhupal
- Meera Vasudev as Dr. Sophy
- Bindu Panicker
- Roslin as Velayudhan's mother
- Shobha Mohan as Mother Superior

== Awards ==
National Film Awards (2007)

- Indira Gandhi Award for Best Debut Film of a Director - Madhu Kaithapram
- Special Jury Award - Thilakan

Kerala State Film Awards (2006)

- Special Jury Award - Madhu Kaithapram

== Soundtrack ==
Music by Kaithapram Viswanathan and Lyrics by Kaithapram Damodaran Namboothiri.

- Kaiyyethum Doore Oru Kuttikkalam - K. J. Yesudas
