= Jahangir Shamz =

Indian film director and film producer

- Born: Shamsudeen Jahangir; 5 March 1969 (age 57); Ayroor, Varkala
- Other name: Shamz
- Occupations: Film Director, Film Producer
- Children: 3

Jahangir Shamz (born Shamsudeen Jahangir 1969 in Varkala, Kerala) is an Indian director and producer who works in Malayalam films.

== Biography ==
Jahangir Shamz started his career as an engineer in 1995. He did a Diploma in Film Making from New York Film Academy (Abu Dhabi).

Jahangir produced a Malayalam feature film in 2009, Madhya Venal, which was directed by Madhu Kaithapram. He produced another feature film in 2011, Bhakthajanangalude Sradhakku directed by Priyanandanan.

In 2013, Jahangir directed his first film, Teens. His next film Karanavar which came out in 2014 was produced by Sandya Rajendran under the banner of Kalidasa International.

== Filmography ==
=== As producer ===
Year	Film
2009	Madhya Venal
2011	Bhakthajanangalude Sradhakku

=== As director ===
Year	Film
2013	Teens
2014	Karanavar
