= Madhya Venal =

- Directed by: Madhu Kaithapram
- Written by: Anil Mukhathala
- Produced by: Jahangir Shamz
- Starring: Manoj K. Jayan; Shweta Menon; Arun Bala; Niveda Thomas
- Cinematography: M. J. Radhakrishnan
- Edited by: Venugopal
- Music by: Kaithapram Viswanathan
- Distributed by: Xarfnet Movies Release
- Release date: 4 July 2009
- Country: India
- Language: Malayalam

Madhya Venal is a 2009 Malayalam film produced by Jahangir Shamz under the banner of Xarfnet Movies. The movie is directed by Madhu Kaithapram starring Manoj K. Jayan and Shweta Menon.

== Plot ==
Sarojini is a housewife and a social worker. In her village, the majority of the villagers depend on the Khadi weaving mills for their livelihood. Sarojini too runs a mill. Her husband Kumaran is a local politician and trade union activist. Praveen who is an executive from a new generation bank comes to help the villagers. Without any proper documents he lends money to them. Being innocent they do not realize the trick behind Praveen's business. Kumaran opposes the bank and also clashes with his party leadership on the plight of workers. Kumaran gets suspended from the party.

Sarojini and Kumaran try their level best to make the people understand Praveen's intention. Meanwhile, Praveen fakes love for Manikutty, the daughter of Kumaran and Sarojini, since they were against him.

== Cast ==
- Manoj K. Jayan as Kumaran
- Shweta Menon as Sarojini
- Sabitha Jayaraj
- Arun Bala as Praveen
- Niveda as Manikutty
- Balachandran Chullikkadu
- Augustine
- Irshad

== Awards ==
- Kerala State Film Award for Best Male Playback Singer - K. J. Yesudas for "Swantham Swantham Baalyathiloode"
- Padmarajan Puraskaram/Award for the Best Movie of 2009 in Malayalam - Madhyavenal.
- Kerala Film Critics Award for Second Best Actress - Shwetha Menon for Madhyavenal in 2009.
- Kerala Film Critics Award for Madhyavenal - the film with social relevance and commitment in 2009.
- Kerala Film Critics Award for Manoj K Jayan - Special Jury Award for Madhyavenal in 2009.
