= C. V. Balakrishnan =

Indian writer (born 1952)

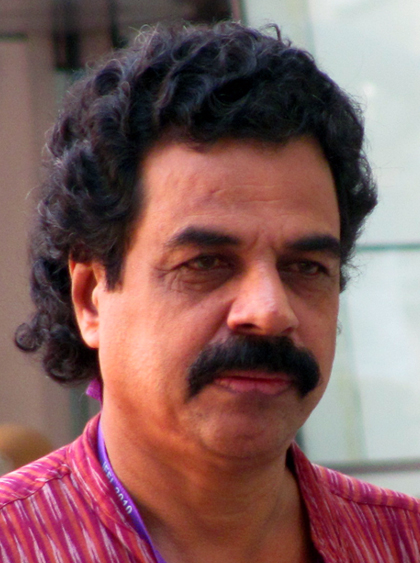
- Balakrishnan in 2010
- Born: 24 September 1952 (age 74); Payyanur, Kerala, India
- Occupation: Writer
- Writing career
- Language: Malayalam
- Genres: Novel, novella, short story, essay, screenplay
- Notable works: Ayussinte Pusthakam; Disa; Kamamohitham; Atmavinu Sariyennu Thonnunna Karyangal
- Notable awards: Kerala Sahitya Akademi Award; Kerala State Film Award

C. V. Balakrishnan (born 24 September 1952) is an Indian writer of Malayalam literature. His novels and short stories encompass the emotional issues related to mass culture, sexual politics, fate of the marginalised and institutionalised religions. An author of more than 60 literary works along with a few film scripts and film criticisms, his best known work is the novel Ayussinte Pusthakam (The Book of Passing Shadows). He received the Kerala Sahitya Akademi Award thrice and the Kerala State Film Award for Best Book on Cinema in 2002 for Cinemayude Idangal. In 2014, he won the Padmaprabha Literary Award.

== Biography ==
Balakrishnan was born in Payyannur, Kannur district, Kerala. After completing his school education, he took training in teaching and worked in various schools before shifting to Calcutta in 1979 where he worked as a freelance journalist. It was in Calcutta he began writing Ayussinte Pusthakam.

== Ayussinte Pusthakam (The Book of Passing Shadows) ==
Ayussinte Pusthakam is considered one of the major works in the post-modernist Malayalam literature. Balakrishnan began writing this novel when he moved to Calcutta in late-1970s. An old edition of the Bible at St. Paul's Cathedral in Calcutta triggered the book in him. It took him three years to complete the novel. Says the author: "All the characters and villages of Christian settlers were in my mind long before I began thinking about writing Ayussinte Pusthakam. The characters are based on people I met during my course as a school teacher in a village in Kasaragod. I wrote Ayussinte Pusthakam at a time when I was going through an emotionally difficult period; my relation with my father was strained and I was feeling very lonely. Ayussinte Pusthakam is about loneliness." The book is also about sin and sadness, written in a style and language that have been judiciously borrowed from The Bible." The novel was successfully adapted for the stage by suveeran in 2008. It won many Kerala Sangeetha Nataka Akademi Awards including one for the best play.

== Bibliography ==
=== Novels ===
- Ayussinte Pusthakam (Kottayam: DC Books, 1984)
- Aathmavinu Sariyennu Thonnunna Karyangal (Kottayam: DC Books, 1997)
- Avanavante Anandam Kandethanulla Vazhikal (Kottayam: DC Books, 2006)
- Disa (Kottayam: DC Books, 2001)
- Ennum Njayarazhcha Aayirunnenkil (Calicut: Mathrubhumi, 2018)
- Jeevithame Nee Enthu? (Kottayam: DC Books, 1987)
- Kannadikkadal (Kottayam: DC Books, 1990)
- Kamamohitham (Valapad: August Books, 1994)
- Kalamezhuthu (Kottayam: N.B.S., 1981)
- Librarian (Kottayam: DC Books, 2014)
- Uparodham (Trivandrum: Chintha, 1981)
- Varu Daivame Varu (Calicut: Mathrubhumi, 2016)
- Arul (Manorama Books, 2023)

=== Novellas ===
- Aadhi
- Aavanakkinte Oru Poovu Allenkil Erikkinter Oru Poovu
- Aagola Grameenar
- Ozhiyabadhakal (Calicut: Poorna, 1996)
- Drushti
- Asthikalile Venal
- Eenthappanayude Thottam
- Ellinpadangal Poovidumbol (Trivandrum: Prabhath, 1999)
- Globinte Ee Vasath
- Irattakkuttikalude Achan
- Parimalaparvatham (Kottayam: DC Books, 2003)
- Vilakkumadam
- Manassinu Ethra Thiraseelakal
- Manjuprathima
- Meen Pidikkaan Poya Gabriel
- Narthanasala
- Amen Amen
- Prappitiyan
- Sari, Pisachineppatti Samsarikkam
- Tharangaleela
- Vishadakala
- Viva Goa (Kottayam: DC Books, 2012)
- Vellivelichathil
- Ithivritham (Trichur: Current, 1994)
- Kadal Guhakal
- Oru Gothra Katha, Oru Charitra Katha, Oru Chalachitra Katha
- Maranam Ennu Perullavan
- Ottakkoru Penkutty (Trichur: Current, 1989)
- Jwalakalapam (Kottayam: DC Books, 1996)
- Etho Rajavinte Prajakal (Trichur: Current, 1985) (collection of five novelettes)
- Ente Pizha Ente Pizha Ente Valiya Pizha (Kottayam: DC Books, 1985) (collection of novelettes: Mazha Nanayunna Pavam, Daivame Ente Pizha Ente Pizha)
- Bhavabhayam (Kottayam: DC Books, 1997)
- Rathisandratha

=== Short story collections ===
- Bhumiye Patti Adhikam Parayanda (Kottayam: S.P.C.S., 1993)
- Daivam Piano Vaayikkumbol (Calicut: Mathrubhumi, 2020)
- Edwin Paul (Trichur: Current, 2016)
- Ente Bhranthan Kinavukal (Kottayam: DC Books, 2021)
- Ente Priyapetta Kathakal (Kottayam: DC Books, 2009) (20 selected stories)
- Katha (Calicut: Mulberry, 1999) (23 selected stories)
- Kulirum Mattu Kathakalum (Calicut: Poorna, 1999)
- Malakhamar Chiraku Veesumbol (Quilon: Imprint, 1994)
- Makkalum Mattu Kathakalum (Kottayam: S.P.C.S., 2000)
- Mamool (Trivandrum: Prabhath, 1999)
- Marukara (Calicut: Mulberry, 1987)
- Pranayakalam (Calicut: Mulberry, 1996)
- Sareeram Ariyunnathu
- Snehavirunnu (Trichur: Current, 1991)
- Thiranjedutha Kathakal (Kottayam: DC Books, 2014) (51 selected stories)
- Ulkrushtaraaya Manushyarum Undu
- Urangan Vayya
- Vishudha Chumbanam (Calicut: Mathrubhumi, 2014)

=== Autobiography ===
- Paralmeen Neenthunna Paadam (Calicut: Mathrubhumi, 2012)

=== Memoirs ===
- Saannidhyam
- Sugandha Sasyangalkidayiloode
- Vaathil Thurannitta Nagarathil
- Aathmaavinodu Cherunnathu

=== Travelogues ===
- Ethetho Saranikalil
- Yathrapathangalil
- Scottish Dinarathrangal

=== Translations ===
- Parethan (Translation of D. H. Lawrence's novel The Escaped Cock)
- Anyadesha Kathakal (Selected stories)
- Vegetarian (Translation of Han Kang's novel The Vegetarian)
- Vruddhanum Vankatalum (Translation of Ernest Hemingway's novel The Old Man and the Sea)

=== Others ===
- Cinemayude Idangal (Essays on Film)
- Mechilsthalangal (Essays)
- Thathyakal Mithyakal (Essays)
- Nerkazhchakalude Neru (Selected Journalism)
- Orma Mathram (Calicut: Mathrubhumi, 2012) (Screenplay)

== Filmography ==
Story, screenplay and dialogues

- Mattoral (1988)
- Puravrutham (1988)
- Sammanam (1997)
- Kattathoru Penpoovu (1997)
- Orma Mathram (2011)
- Vellivelichathil (2014)

Story

- Irattakuttikalude Achan (1997)
- Kochu Kochu Santhoshangal (2000)
- Kottaram Veettile Apputtan (1998)
- Thoramazhayathu (2010)
- Segment Puzha in the anthology Cheraathukal (2021)

== Awards ==
- 1994: SBI Malayalam Literary Award for Maalakhamaar chiraku veesumbol
- 1998: V. T. Bhattathiripad Memorial Award for Atmavinu Sariyennu Thonnunna Karyangal
- 2000: Kerala Sahitya Akademi Award (Novel) for Atmavinu Sariyennu Thonnunna Karyangal
- 2001: Kerala Film Critics Association Award for Kochu Kochu Santhoshangal
- 2002: Kerala State Film Award (Best Book on Cinema) for Cinemayude Idangal
- 2008: Mayilpeeli Puraskaram
- 2010: Shantakumaran Thampi Award
- 2012: O. Chandu Menon Puraskaram
- 2012: Basheer Puraskaram
- 2012: Kalakeralam Award (Best screenplay) for Orma Mathram
- 2013: Muttathu Varkey Award
- 2014: Padmaprabha Literary Award
- 2014: Kerala Sahitya Akademi Award (Autobiography) for Paralmeen Neenthunna Paadam
- 2015: Abu Dhabi Malayalee Samajam Sahitya Puraskaram
- 2017: Kerala Sahitya Akademi Award (Travelogue) for Ethetho Saranikalil
- 2018: Mundur Krishnankutty Award
