= Vineeth =

Indian actor

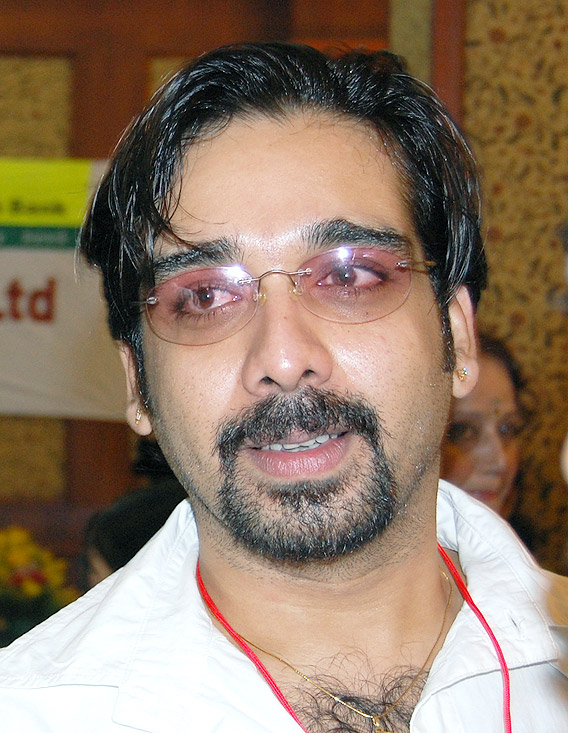
- Vineeth in 2008
- Born: Vineeth Radhakrishnan; 23 August 1969 (age 57); Thalassery, Kerala, India
- Occupations: Actor; dancer; voice artist; choreographer
- Years active: 1985 – present
- Spouse: Priscilla Menon (m. 2004)
- Children: 1
- Relatives: Shobana (cousin)
- Family: See Travancore family
- Honours: Kalaimamani Award (2006)

Vineeth Radhakrishnan (born 23 August 1969) is an Indian actor, Bharatanatyam dancer, voice artist and choreographer who primarily works in Malayalam, Tamil and Telugu language films. He has also appeared in a few Hindi and Kannada films. He has won several awards including 3 Kerala State Film Awards, Kalaimamani honour from Government of Tamil Nadu and Filmfare Award South nominations.

== Early life ==
Vineeth was born to K. T. Radhakrishnan and P. K. Shanthakumari on 23 August 1969 at Thalassery in Kannur district, Kerala. His family hails from the Travancore region (present-day southern Kerala districts) related to the Travancore Sisters, and his family later settled in Kannur district. He has a sister, Kavitha Dinesh. Vineeth is the nephew of Ramachandran Nair, the husband of actress Padmini of the Travancore sisters. His aunt, Padmini, and her sister, Ragini, convinced his parents to send him to dancing school. Actress Shobana is his cousin.

Vineeth attended Good Shepherd International School, Ooty, St Joseph's Higher Secondary School, Thalassery, and St. Joseph's College, Devagiri, Kozhikode. He then pursued a Bachelor of Commerce from The New College, Chennai, in 1991.

Vineeth started training in Bharathanatyam at the age of six and won several dance prizes while a student, including the first prize at the Kerala School Kalolsavam for four years in a row, also winning the top title of "Kalaprathibha" in 1986.

== Film career ==
Vineeth entered films with the I. V. Sasi film Idanilangal in 1985, and caught the public eye with his second film, Nakhakshathangal, in 1986. His dancing skills were prominently displayed in several films as well. He played the lead characters in Idanazhiyil Oru Kaalocha (1987), a story by poet Balachandran Chullikkadu and Oru Muthassi Katha (1988) directed by Priyadarshan. Aavarampoo (1992), the Tamil remake of Thakara changed everything for Vineeth directed by Bharathan. As soon as Aavarampoo ended, Hariharan called him for Sargam (1992), in which he played a musical genius. Suddenly Vineeth was doing multiple films in Malayalam and Tamil. Kabooliwala (1994) and Manathe Vellitheru (1994) became two turning points in his Malayalam career, one establishing him as a young romantic hero, the other proving he could handle negative shades really well. Though his films impressed both critics and front benchers, he did not become a super hero, a sought after actor. He had appeared in maximum Malayalam films. But his career did not pick up as expected.

His roles in successful Tamil films also include Gentleman (1993), Pudhiya Mugam (1993), Jaathi Malli (1993) and May Maadham (1994). Among other projects came Kadhal Desam (1996), where Vineeth and Abbas played college students in love with the same woman, played by Tabu. The movie, with its themes of friendship and romance and the music of A. R. Rahman, became very popular. He has acted in several well received films since then in all the main South Indian languages. In spite of his success in films, he still considers dance as his first love and is undergoing advanced training in Bharatanatyam and participates in several dance programmes all over the world as well as the Surya Dance Festival. He has worked in several Telugu films such as Aaro Pranam (1997), Maa Annayya (2000), Ammayi Kosam (2001), Nee Premakai (2002) and Lahiri Lahiri Lahirilo (2002). Vineeth, who disappeared from both Tamil and Malayalam cinema, made a comeback with Rajinikanth starrer Chandramukhi (2005). He played the same role in the Hindi version of Bhool Bhulaiyaa (2007) as well. He also played in many roles in Malayalam films such as Rathri Mazha (2007), Banaras (2009), Thathwamasi (2010), Ideal Couple (2012), Omega Brothers (2012), Aattakatha (2013), Sukhamayirikkatte (2015) and Pallikoodam (2016).

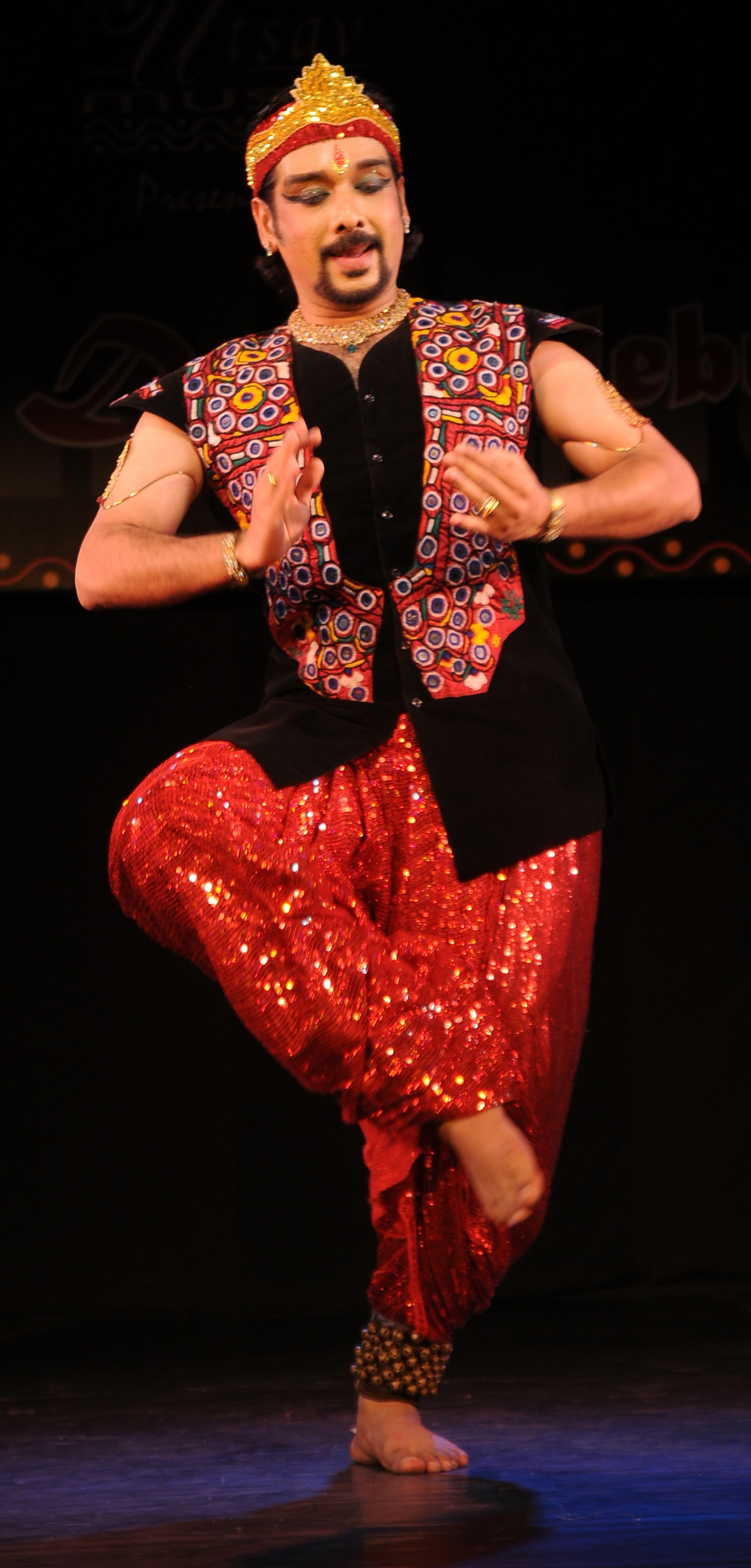
Vineeth performing at Utsav Music and Krishna Gana Sabha on ′International Dance Day’, 30 April 2012

He won the Kerala State Film Award for Best Choreography for Kambhoji in 2017. Vineeth has collaborated with G. V. Prakash Kumar in Sarvam Thaala Mayam (2019). It was a Tamil musical drama that was written and directed by Rajiv Menon. Actor singer Krishnachandran dubbed for Vineeth in most of his early movies. Ironically, Vineeth won the Kerala State Film Award for Best Dubbing Artist in 2020 for giving voice to Vivek Oberoi's character in Lucifer, actor Prithviraj’s first as a director. In Malayalam, he was seen in Kavya Prakash's debut film Vaanku (2021), based on a story by Unni R. In Marakkar: Lion of the Arabian Sea (2021), he dubbed for the character played by Tamil star Arjun Sarja. Vineeth won the award for his dubbing. In 2023, he co-starred with Fahadh Faasil in Pachuvum Athbutha Vilakkum and Dhoomam. He is making his comeback in Tamil cinema and plays a father in the drama film, Kaadhal Enbadhu Podhu Udamai (2025).

== Personal life ==
Vineeth married Priscilla Menon, who hails from Thalassery, in August 2004. They live in Chennai, and a daughter was born to them in 2006.

== Awards and nominations ==
- 1986 - Kalaprathibha - Kerala School Kalolsavam
- 1992 - Best New Face award by Film Fan's Association in Tamil Nadu for Aavarampoo
- 1992 - Kerala Film Critics Association Awards Second Best Actor award for Daivathinte Vikrithikal and Sargam
- 1993 - Supporting Actor award by Film Fan's Association in Tamil Nadu for Jathi Malli and Pudhiya Mugam
- 2006 - Yuvakala Bharathi award - Bharath Kalachar
- 2006 - Kalaimamani Award from Government of Tamil Nadu
- 2013 - Asiavision Awards for Best Supporting Actor
- 2013 - Filmfare Award for Best Supporting Actor – Malayalam - Nominated for Bavuttiyude Namathil
- 2017 - Kerala State Film Award for Best Choreography - Kambhoji for the song "Chenthar Nermukhi"
- 2020 - Kerala State Film Award for Best Dubbing Artist - Lucifer (dubbed for Vivek Oberoi)
- 2021 - Kerala State Film Award for Best Dubbing Artist - Marakkar: Arabikadalinte Simham (dubbed for Arjun Sarja)

== Filmography ==
=== Malayalam films ===
Year	Title	Role	Notes
1985	Idanilangal	Kunjumon	
1986	Nakhakshathangal	Ramu	
1986	Pranamam	Appukuttan	
1986	Namukku Parkkan Munthiri Thoppukal	Antony	
1986	Idanazhiyil Oru Kaalocha	Ananth	
1987	Oridathu	Josekutty	
1987	Amrutham Gamaya	Unnikrishnan	
1987	Rithubhedam	Keshavan	
1987	Ponnu		
1987	Kanikanum Neram	Vinu	
1988	Aranyakam	Mohan	
1988	Kanakambarangal	Rajan	
1988	Janmandharam	Unnikrishnan	
1988	Oru Muthassi Katha	Chanthu	
1989	Mahayanam	Rameshan	
1989	Rugmini		
1990	Lal Salam	Medayil Josekutty	
1990	Kattukuthira	Mohan	
1990	Aaram Vardil Aabhyanthara Kalaham		
1992	Champakulam Thachan	Chanthutti	
1992	Aacharyan	Abraham	
1992	Daivathinte Vikrithikal	Son of Landlord	Kerala State Film Critics Association Second Best Actor Award
1992	Kamaladalam	Somashekharanunni (Malavika's lover)	
1992	Sargam	Haridas	Kerala State Film Critics Association Second Best Actor Award
1993	Gazal	Muneer	
1993	Samooham	Udayan	
1993	Kalippattam	Harikrishnan	
1993	Kabuliwala	Munna	
1993	Kanyakumariyil Oru Kavitha	Vishnu	
1993	Arthana	Jayakrishnan	
1994	Manathe Vellitheru	Ramesh	
1994	Parinayam	Madhavan	
1994	Daivathinte Vikrithikal	Landlord's son	
1995	Thakshashila	Salman	
1995	Highway	Vinod Menon	
1995	Thacholi Varghese Chekavar	Shyam	
1996	Kala Pani	G S Sethu	Dubbed in Tamil as Sirai Chaalai
1996	Hitler	Whistling Passenger	Cameo appearance
1996	Kavadam		Unreleased
1999	Mazhavillu	Vijay Krishnan	
1999	Prempujari	Murali	
1999	Ustaad	Nandan	
2000	Darling Darling	Subash Chandra Bose/ Kochu Kurup / Aniyankutty (fake identity)	
2004	Perumazhakkalam	Raghu Rama Iyer	Guest Appearance
2004	Chathikkatha Chanthu	Krishna	
2005	Alice in Wonderland	Victor Joseph	
2005	Mayookham		
2006	Moonnamathoral	Dr. Arun	
2006	Vadakkum Nathan	Parameshwaran	
2007	Rathri Mazha	Harikrishnan	
2008	Mizhikal Sakshi	Aravind	
2009	2 Harihar Nagar	Shyam Sundhar	
2009	Chemistry	Aloshy	
2009	Banaras	Hari	
2010	Neelambari	Devanand	
2010	Thathwamasi	Rameshan	
2010	Killy Killy	Aloshy	
2011	Munthiri Paadam	Munna	
2012	Bavuttiyude Namathil	Satheeshan	
2012	Ideal Couple	Ganeshan	
2012	Father's Day	Gopan	
2012	Arike	Balu	
2013	Breaking News Live	Deepak	
2013	Omega Brothers	Sidharth	
2013	Aattakatha	Unnikrishnan	
2013	Ezhamathe Varavu	Prasad	
2013	Cleopatra		
2014	Swapaanam	Thuppan Namboodiri	
2015	100 Days of Love	S. P. Pillai	
2015	Sukhamayirikkatte		
2015	Kumbasaram	Rafi	
2015	Njan Samvidhanam Cheyum		
2015	Akkaldhamayile Pennu	Anto	
2016	Pallikoodam	Gokul Sir	
2017	Kambhoji	Kunjunni	
2019	Panthu	Anwar	
2019	Madhaveeyam	Madhav Dev	
2021	Vaanku	Razak	
2021	Kaalchilambu	Kannan, Jayadevan	
2023	Pachuvum Athbutha Vilakkum	Riyas	
2023	Dhoomam	Praveen	
2023	Nila	Mahi	
2024	Manorathangal	Venugopal's father	Released on ZEE5 Anthology series Segment: Kadugannawa, Oru Yathra Kurippu
2025	Dheeran	Abubackar Haji	
2025	Dominic and the Ladies' Purse	Adv. Prakash Menon	
2025	Eko	Mohan Pothan	
2025	Sarvam Maya	Vinod Mathew Manjooran	
2026	Secret Stories: Roslin	John	JioHotstar series
2026	Bouma	Samuel	

=== Tamil films ===
Year	Film	Role	Ref.
1992	Aavarampoo	Sakkarai	Best New Face Awarded from the Film Fan's Association in Tamil Nadu
1993	Jathi Malli	Moscow	
1993	Pudhiya Mugam	Raja Rajeswaran / Hari (dual role)	
1993	Gentleman	Ramesh	
1994	May Madham	Eeshwar	
1996	Kadhal Desam	Karthik	
1997	Sakthi	Sakthi	
1997	Devathai	Umapathi	
1997	Nandhini	Suresh	
1998	Simmarasi	Kathir	
1999	Maravathe Kanmaniye	Surya	
1999	Suyamvaram	Gautham	
2000	Karisakattu Poove	Pounrasu	
2001	Vedham	Sanjay	
2003	Kadhal Kirukkan	Gautham	
2003	Priyamana Thozhi	Michael D'Souza	
2005	Chandramukhi	Viswanathan & Gunashekaran	
2006	Pasakiligal	Nallarasu	
2008	Sila Nerangalil	Madhavan	
2008	Uliyin Osai	Iniyan	
2019	Sarvam Thaala Mayam	Mani	
2025	Kaadhal Enbadhu Podhu Udamai	Devaraj	

=== Telugu films ===
Year	Film	Role	Ref.
1993	Sarigamalu	Kalidasu	
1997	Evandi Pelli Chesukondi	Vijay	
1997	Aaro Pranam	Chanti	
1997	Rukmini	Ravi	
1998	Prema Pallaki		
1998	Priyuralu		Dubbed in Malayalam as Manjeeradhwani
1998	Padutha Theeyaga	Rushi	
1998	W/o V. Vara Prasad	Varaprasad	
1999	Preminchalani Vundi		
1999	Prema Kosam	Rahul	
2000	Balaram	Srinivasa Prasad	
2000	Maa Annayya	Shekhar	
2001	Ammayi Kosam	Venkat	
2002	Lahiri Lahiri Lahirilo	Srinivasa Naidu	
2002	Nee Premakai	Srinivas	
2003	Maa Bapu Bommaku Pellanta	Krishnamoorthy	Cameo appearance
2005	Thanks	Sri Ram	
2021	Rang De	Arjun's brother-in-law	

=== Other language films ===
Year	Film	Role	Language	References
1997	Daud: Fun on the Run	Inspector Sri	Hindi	
1998	Kanasalu Neene Manasalu Neene	Raghunandan	Kannada	
2002	Bokshu – The Myth	Rati's lover	English	
2007	Bhool Bhulaiyaa	Sharad Pradhan / Shashidhar	Hindi	
2010	Aptharakshaka	Ramanatha	Kannada	
2011	Queens! Destiny Of Dance	Mukta	Hindi	

=== Dubbing ===
Year	Film	Dubbed for	Character	Language	Notes
2019	Lucifer	Vivek Oberoi	Bimal Nair / Bobby	Malayalam	Won, Kerala State Film Award for Best Dubbing Artist
2020	Big Brother	Arbaaz Khan	Vedantham IPS	Malayalam	
2020	The Kung Fu Master	Jiji Scaria	Rishi Ram	Malayalam	
2021	Marakkar: Arabikadalinte Simham	Arjun Sarja	Ananthan	Malayalam	Won, Kerala State Film Award for Best Dubbing Artist
2022	Kaduva	Vivek Oberoi	I.G Joseph Chandy / Ouseppukutty	Malayalam	
2022	Ottu	Arvind Swamy	David	Malayalam	
