= Geetha Poduval =

Entrepreneur and activist for disabled people

Geeta Poduval
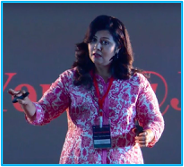
- Born: Ahmedabad
- Occupations: Entrepreneur; activist
- Years active: 2012-present

Geeta Poduval is a social entrepreneur, motivational speaker, and activist for disabled people. She is the founder of DRZYA, a firm that trains disabled people to perform and provides a platform for disabled performances, talks and workshops. She is also the founder of Drzyashakti Trust, an NGO for the services of disabled people.

She was previously an actress and news anchor. The two notable films to her credit are Sukumarji's Kandethal and Madhu Kaithapram's Vellivelichathil.

== Early life and background ==
In 2017 she founded Drzya, a firm that offers disabled artists opportunities to showcase their talent professionally and participate in inspirational talks and workshops. Later in 2018 she founded Drzyashakti Trust to serve and promote the causes of disabled people. Presently she is involved in capacity building of disabled people, counselling and mentoring them, delivering workshops and inspirational talks.

== Acting ==
Geeta has acted in films, TV serials, corporate films and advertisements.

- Vellivelichatthil – In the Limelight (Malayalam, released 2014). She played the second heroine in the film as John Brittas’ wife. Directed by Madhu Kaithapram.
- Kandethal – The Revelation (Malayalam, released 2016). She played the female protagonist. Directed by Sukumarji.
- Crime Branch (Malayalam, TV serial, 2014). Played the lead role of Assistant Commissioner of Police for eight episodes for Kairali TV Channel.

== Training and speaking ==
Geeta has been a speaker at various forums and events. She was a speaker at TEDxYouth@JGIS. She was invited as the Keynote speaker during the Daughters’ Day celebration of the Bengaluru chapters of PRCI and YCC. She has been conducting training programs and motivational talks for corporate houses and government organisations for many years on a wide range of topics including women leadership, diversity and inclusion, POSH, managing life and life goals among others.
