= Orma Mathram =

- theaterical poster
- Directed by: Madhu Kaithapram
- Screenplay by: C. V. Balakrishnan
- Story by: Rahim Kadvath
- Produced by: Rajan Thaliparamba
- Starring: Dileep; Priyanka Nair; Master Siddharth; Dhanya Mary Varghese
- Cinematography: M. J. Radhakrishnan
- Edited by: Kevin Thomas
- Music by: Background score: Johnson; Songs: Kaithapram Viswanathan
- Production company: Horizon Entertainment
- Distributed by: Horizon Entertainment Release; Kalasangham Films
- Release date: 29 July 2011
- Country: India
- Language: Malayalam

Orma Mathram (English: Memories only) is a 2011 Malayalam-language drama film directed by Madhu Kaithapram and starring Dileep, Priyanka Nair, Master Sidharth, Dhanya Mary Varghese, and Nedumudi Venu in the main roles. The screenplay was written by C. V. Balakrishnan based on a story by Rahim Kadavath.

== Cast ==
- Dileep as Ajayan
- Priyanka Nair as Safiya, Ajayan's wife
- Master Sidharth as Deepu, Ajayan's son
- Jagathy Sreekumar as Radhakrishna Warrier, the lawyer
- Dhanya Mary Varghese
- Nedumudi Venu As Samson uncle
- Sathi Premji as Jew lady, wife of Nedumudi Venu (Maria Aunty)
- Salim Kumar
- Harishree Ashokan
- Hakim Rawther as man at orphanage

== Reception ==
The film was critically acclaimed but as an art film, it was not well received in the theaters. Undoubtedly, it is one of the best performances in Dileep's career. Master Siddharth won the Mathrubhumi Film Awards 2011 and Amrita TV Film Awards for his performance.
