= Irattakuttikalude Achan =

- Directed by: Sathyan Anthikad
- Screenplay by: Sreenivasan
- Story by: C. V. Balakrishnan
- Based on: Irattakuttikalude Achan by C. V. Balakrishnan
- Produced by: Madhavan Nair
- Starring: Jayaram; Manju Warrier; Sreenivasan; Lalu Alex; Murali; Urmila Unni; Kavya Madhavan
- Cinematography: Vipin Mohan
- Edited by: K. Rajagopal
- Music by: Johnson
- Production company: Murali Films
- Release date: 4 April 1997
- Country: India
- Language: Malayalam

Irattakuttikalude Achan (transl. Father of twins) is a 1997 Indian Malayalam-language family drama film directed by Sathyan Anthikad and written by Sreenivasan, adapted from the novella of the same name by C. V. Balakrishnan. It stars Jayaram and Manju Warrier, while Murali, Urmila Unni, Sreenivasan and Lalu Alex appears in supporting roles. The film was remade in Telugu as Ooyala (1998).

== Plot ==
The story revolves around the life of Rajeevan who elopes with a rich girl. Later when persuaded he gives away one of his twin children to a stranger who lost all his children at birth.

== Cast ==
- Jayaram as Rajeevan
- Manju Warrier as Anupama, Rajeevan's wife
- Sreenivasan as Constable Sahadevan
- Murali as Venugopal
- Urmila Unni as Devi, Venugopal's wife
- Lalu Alex as Doctor Ravindranath
- Kochu Preman as Valsalan
- Kozhikode Shanta Devi as Valsalan's mother
- Vishnuprakash as Pothuval, Anupama's father
- Ponnamma Babu as Anupama's mother
- Kavya Madhavan as Dhanya, Anupama's sister
- Sukumari as Gracy teacher
- Kuthiravattam Pappu as S. I. Kuruppu
- Krishnakumar as Robert
- Manju Pillai as Indira, Sahadevan's wife
- Master Akashlal as Twins

== Production ==
The film is an adaptation of the novella of the same name, written by C. V. Balakrishnan. Sathyan Anthikad later commented that, as a father of twin sons, the title was the first aspect of the book that drew his attention.

== Soundtrack ==
Irattakuttikalude Achan

Soundtrack album by Johnson
- Genre: Film
- Language: Malayalam

All lyrics are written by Kaithapram Damodaran; all music is composed by Johnson.

No.	Title	Artist(s)	Length
1.	"Ethra Neramaay Njaan"	K. J. Yesudas
2.	"Kannanennu Peru"	K. S. Chithra
3.	"Nee Kaanumo"	K. S. Chithra
4.	"Nee Kaanumo"	K. J. Yesudas
