= Manathe Vellitheru =

- Directed by: Fazil
- Written by: Fazil
- Produced by: P.Khais
- Starring: Vineeth; Shobana; Mukesh; Sreenivasan; Lalu Alex; Sanup Kumar; Lakshmi
- Cinematography: Anandakuttan
- Edited by: T.R.Shekhar
- Music by: Johnson
- Release date: 11 November 1994
- Country: India
- Language: Malayalam

Manathe Vellitheru (transl. The Silver Chariot in the Sky) is a 1994 Indian Malayalam-language musical thriller film written and directed by Fazil, starring Vineeth, Shobana, Mukesh, Lakshmi, Sanup Kumar and Sreenivasan. The film was dubbed in Tamil as Murattu Kaadhal.

== Plot ==
The story begins with City Police Commissioner Babu Mohan sending his subordinate and close friend Circle Inspector Appukuttan, a man with kleptomaniac tendencies, to take a statement from Merlin Fernandez, a beloved pop singer who is troubled by a stalker.

Merlin met a young man named Ramesh, a young, rich, professional gambler, who reveals he is a fan, and they gradually form a friendship, encountering each other on some occasions including her performances. On one such day, Merlin sees Ramesh react violently to some rude people, and becomes convinced that he is obsessed with her. Further antics by Ramesh begin to worry Merlin and her crew, to the point that she arranges for her people to beat him up. In the end, as things begin to go further out of hand, Merlin requests for police protection.

Despite the best efforts from Appukuttan and Babu, Ramesh keeps on meeting Merlin, to her own displeasure. Fed up with the inefficiency of the police, Merlin arranges for goons to beat up Ramesh, but even that fails. Ramesh is soon classified as a wanted suspect. Meanwhile, during his various encounters with Merlin, Ramesh professes that he adores her, wants her and wishes to die in her arms, but he cannot understand why he is obsessed with her. This however only further complicates issues.

During his investigation of the matter, Babu recovers a cassette tape from Ramesh's car, and on playing it, finds that it only has two verses of one of Merlin's songs being looped to repeat. He believes this to be some sort of a clue. Meanwhile, Merlin decides to marry businessman Thomas Jacob, believing that this will get rid of Ramesh, but it only escalates his obsession. He calls Merlin, threatening to kill her, Thomas and then himself if the wedding happens. Meanwhile, Babu and Appukuttan locate Ramesh, who surrenders willingly. During a tense interrogation, Ramesh shows signs of psychological distress. Ramesh reveals to Babu that he has no recollection about his past or his childhood, and has no clue why he is so obsessed with Merlin. Realizing that Ramesh is honest and needs help, Babu allows him to go. But in the process, Ramesh misplaces the only possession that has he has always had with him, a silver medallion which he considers his lucky charm. After finding that Appukuttan swiped the medallion, Babu decides to use it to find out about Ramesh's past.

Merlin and Thomas get engaged, and this further frustrates Ramesh. Meanwhile, Babu, tracing the history of the medallion, reaches a mental asylum, where he encounters Yasodhamma, an old woman, who identifies the medal to be her son's. After further investigation, Babu reveals to Merlin and her family that he knows who Ramesh is and why he is obsessed with Merlin. Ramesh is the eldest child of Yasodhamma, a music teacher, who loved him and gave him the silver medallion, a family heirloom, as a gift. Ramesh's father however, was a drunkard gambler who used to abuse Yasodhamma in his angry and drunken state. During one such drunken rage, Ramesh's father accidentally killed his infant daughter, Ramesh's sister. In a grief-filled rage, Yasodhamma stabbed the man to death, and decided to kill herself and Ramesh to end their suffering, but Ramesh managed to run away before Yasodhamma could harm him. Yasodhamma was jailed and lost her sanity, and was later admitted to a mental asylum when no one came for her, while Ramesh's trauma caused him to repress his memories. Babu reveals that Ramesh's obsession towards Merlin is rooted in her music. Merlin, who style of music is pop renditions of known folk tunes, coincidentally used one of the tunes which Yasodhamma used to sing to Ramesh as a lullaby in one of her songs, the same music which Babu found in the cassette, and this invoked an attachment towards her in him. Through Merlin and her music, Ramesh is seeking his own past, and in the process, his mother.

Babu asks Merlin and Thomas to postpone their wedding so that he can find Ramesh and reunite him with his mother, but is refused by Thomas. On their wedding day, Babu places police protection around the venue, but despite all that, Ramesh manages to kidnap Anu, Merlin's little niece, and demands that Merlin and Thomas be brought to him in exchange for her. Police surround the area but are held back by Ramesh, whose mental state is rapidly falling. But before he can do any harm, Merlin reaches his hideout with a now released Yasodhamma, singing the old lullaby. This manages to bring back Ramesh's repressed memories, and he gives up, overcome with grief. Merlin reunites an emotionally broken Ramesh with Yasodhamma, who regains some sanity after seeing her son. Feeling guilty, Ramesh apologizes to Merlin and Thomas, and thanks Merlin for reuniting his family. Babu, understanding that Ramesh's actions were the result of his deep rooted trauma, lets him go free and returns his lucky silver medallion back to him.

In the end, Merlin returns to the stage, more energetic than ever, and her show is watched by her fans, family, Babu, Appukuttan and of course, Ramesh and his mother.

== Cast ==
- Vineeth as Ramesh
- Shobana as Merlin Fernandez
- Mukesh as Commissioner Babu Mohan
- Sreenivasan as CI Appukkuttan
- Lalu Alex as Thomas Jacob
- Rekha Harris as Julie
- Lakshmi as Yasodhamma, Ramesh's mother
- Sanup Kumar as Childhood Ramesh
- N. F. Varghese as Abdulla
- Anjali Nair
- V. K. Sreeraman as Ramesh's father
- Jose Pellisseri as Merlin's Make Up Man
- T. P. Madhavan as Underworld Don
- Mafia Sasi as Sathyan

== Soundtrack ==
The music was composed by Johnson, with lyrics by Shibu Chakravarthy.

Song	Singers
Anthimaanachoppu	Chandrasekhar, K S Chithra
Ethaanarangennu	Yesudas, K S Chithra
Maanathe Vellitheril	Yesudas, K S Chithra
Manassin Madiyile	Vani Jairam
Manassin Madiyile [Duet]	K S Chithra, Vani Jairam
Moovanthi	Mano, Malgudi Subha

== Reception ==
The movie was well received by the audience and critics praised the performance of Vineeth as the stalker of Merlin (played by Shobhana).
