= Five Fingers (2005 film) =

- Directed by: Sanjeev Raj
- Written by: S. Suresh Babu
- Produced by: Saji Nanthyattu
- Starring: Kunchacko Boban; Karthika
- Cinematography: Santosh K. Lal
- Edited by: P.C. Mohanan
- Music by: Benny Johnson
- Release date: 13 May 2005
- Country: India
- Language: Malayalam

Five Fingers is a 2005 Indian Malayalam romance film by Sanjeev Raj (in his directorial debut). starring Kunchacko Boban and Karthika.

== Plot ==
Five close friends, Manu, Meera, Rafeeq, Ashok Baby and Vijayakumar, are studying at a college. They are very close pals and willing to do anything for each other.

== Cast ==
- Kunchacko Boban as Manu
- Karthika as Meera
- Sudheesh as Rafeeq
- Ashok Baby
- Riyaz Khan as Hari Narayanan IPS
- Siddique as Chandrappan
- Bineesh Kodiyeri as Amitt
- Sai Kumar as Krishna Murthy
- Augustine as Kuriachan
- Janardhanan as Fr. Nedumbaran
- Kalpana as Marykutti
- K. P. A. C. Sunny
- Madhupal as Sunnychan
- K. G. George as Doctor
- Ambika Mohan as Rafeeq's Mother

== Production ==
The film was shot in Kottayam in 2004.

== Soundtrack ==
The film has eight songs composed by Benny Johnson. The lyrics were written by Sachidanandan Puzhankara.

Track listing
No.	Title	Singer(s)	Length
1.	"Ormayil"	K. J. Yesudas	6:03
2.	"Karivalayo"	Sujatha Mohan	4:40
3.	"Thinkalpottu"	Shankar Mahadevan	4:48
4.	"Karivalayo"	K. J. Yesudas, Sujatha Mohan	4:40
5.	"Makkachi"	Afsal	4:04
6.	"Pachakkili"	Sabulal	6:09
7.	"Chandanaponn"	K. J. Yesudas	4:39
8.	"Ee Paattu"	Radhika Thilak	4:21
Total length:			39:24
