= Cleopatra (2013 film) =

- Promotional Poster
- Directed by: Rajan Sankaradi
- Written by: Satheesh Kumar
- Produced by: TKR Nair; Pioneer Worldwise Pictures
- Starring: Manoj K. Jayan; Vineeth; Sudha Chandran; Shankar; Urmila Unni; Aswathy; Prerna; Sudheesh
- Cinematography: Muralikrishnan
- Edited by: P.C.Mohanan
- Music by: Sangeetha Varma; Manjunath Jayavijaya; Narayananunni S Surya Narayanan
- Production company: Kalidasa Kalakendram
- Release date: 25 October 2013
- Country: India
- Language: Malayalam

Cleopatra is a 2013 Indian Malayalam-language film directed by Rajan Sankaradi, starring Manoj K. Jayan, Vineeth, Sudha Chandran, and veteran Shankar. Its release was on hold for over 2 years and released on 25 October

== Plot ==
Cleopatra is an emotional family film which concentrates on family bondings.

== Cast ==
- Manoj K Jayan
- Vineeth
- Sudha Chandran
- Shankar
- Urmila Unni
- Aswathy
- Prerna
- Sudheesh
- Santhakumari
