= Marupuram =

- Poster
- Directed by: Viji Thampi
- Written by: Renjith; Kaloor Dennis
- Produced by: Joy Thomas
- Starring: Jayaram; Mukesh; Urvashi; Sukumaran; Jagathy Sreekumar
- Cinematography: K. G. Jayan; Jayanan Vincent
- Edited by: K. P. Hariharaputhran
- Music by: Mohan Sithara
- Distributed by: Jubilee Productions
- Release date: 1990
- Running time: 139 minutes
- Country: India
- Language: Malayalam

Marupuram (transl. The other side) is a 1990 Indian Malayalam-language action thriller film directed by Viji Thampi and written by Renjith and Kaloor Dennis. The film stars Jayaram, Mukesh, Urvashi, Sukumaran, Jagathy Sreekumar, M. G. Soman, Siddique, Lalu Alex, Jagadish and Devan.

== Plot ==
Two friends, Sethu and Roy, are staying at a lodge owned by Rathna and managed by Chaakkunni. Sethu and Roy do con jobs to make ends meet and save money to send Roy abroad for a better life. But they are cheated by Travel Agent, they attempt a burglary that goes wrong and lands them in jail. After their release, Sethu decides to part ways with Roy. Sethu reaches the lodge as he's in love with Rathna. Chaakkunni helps Sethu by giving him some educational certificates that belonged to a previous tenant. Sethu changes his name to Albert (the name on the educational certificate) and lands in a job as a company supervisor. Sethu lives in fear that someone will recognize him as Sethu costing him his job and sending him to prison again for forgery. Bharathan Menon, a friend of Sethu's boss comes to visit him along with his family. His daughter is depressed and refuses marriage. Menon's meeting with Sethu startles and surprises him. He informs Sethu that he has seen him somewhere and starts probing, which frightens Sethu.

Salim comes to town and starts inquiring about Albert. His agenda is to bump off Sethu. his first attempt fails. After Sethu returns, he sees Roy who has come to meet him. After dropping him off, Salim attacks Sethu again but loses his life accidentally.

Issac Thomas investigates Salim's death. He finds a note of Albert's address in Salim's wallet and his encounter with Sethu raises doubt of Sethu's actual identity. The investigation begins and becomes more complex. The real Albert is dead and the suspect list is long, as everyone has a motive to kill Albert. Issac Thomas' investigation leads him from one suspect to another, and finally, it is revealed that it was Francis who killed Albert to protect his brother Binoy & his friends, who raped Menon's daughter while she was eloping with Albert. Francis then dumps Albert's body in Menon's garage and proceeds to blackmail him to get more time for an earlier deal they had between them. Sethu is exonerated and reunites with Roy & Rathna.

== Cast ==
- Jayaram as Sethumadhavan / Sethu / Albert Alex (Fake)
- Mukesh as Roy, Sethu's Friend
- Urvashi as Rathnamma, Sethu's Lover
- Sukumaran as CI Issac Thomas
- Jagathy Sreekumar as Chakkunni, Caretaker of Rathnamma Lodge, Sethu and Roy's Friend
- Manoj K. Jayan as Real Albert Alex / Aby
- Lalu Alex as Adv. R. K. Pillai / Pillaichan, Issac's Friend
- Siddique as SI Rasheed, Issac's Subordinate Officer
- Jagadish as Mathew, Sethu's Friend and Travel Agency Manager (Extended Cameo)
- M. G. Soman as Bharathan Menon, Pillai's Friend
- Devan as Francis, Pillai's business partner
- Keerikkadan Jose as Salim, Bharathan Menon's henchman
- Ashokan as Binoy, Francis's brother
- Mahesh as Raghu, Binoy's friend
- T. P. Madhavan as Krishnanunni Menon, Bharathan Menon's brother and Maya's uncle
- Jagannathan as Nair, Pillai's clerk
- Kaveri as Maya Menon, Bharathan Menon's daughter and Albert's lover
- Paravoor Bharathan as Harishankar, Rathnamma's father
- Spadikam George as Gopi Menon, police officer
- Nandu as Shibu, autorickshaw driver
- Appa Haja as Sibi, Binoy's friend
- Viji Thampi as Kariyachan
- Rajan Sankaradi as forensic surgeon
- Kaladi Omana as Krishnanunni Menon's wife and Maya's aunt
- Nayana as Maya's friend
