= Guruji Oru Vakku =

- Poster designed by Gayathri Ashokan
- Directed by: Rajan Sankaradi
- Written by: Venu Nagavally
- Starring: Mohanlal; Madhu; Nedumudi Venu; Ratheesh
- Cinematography: Vipin Mohan
- Edited by: K. P. Hariharaputhran
- Music by: Jerry Amaldev; Johnson (score)
- Production company: Gajaraja Films
- Distributed by: Gajaraja Films
- Release date: 9 November 1985
- Country: India
- Language: Malayalam

Guruji Oru Vakku (transl. Guruji, a word) is a 1985 Indian Malayalam-language film directed by Rajan Sankaradi (in his directorial debut) and written by Venu Nagavally. The film stars Mohanlal, Madhu, Nedumudi Venu, and Ratheesh. The film has songs composed by Jerry Amaldev and a background score by Johnson.

== Plot ==
The film depicts two jobless friends, Charli and Gopakumar (Gopu), who survive by selling what they steal from parked vehicles to a second-hand parts dealer. Charli is good at heart, living with memories of a lost love. Gopu is a playboy, trying to woo wealthy girls. They meet Unni, who was cheated in an employment racket and wants to join the group. In an attempt to steal a car stereo, they are caught by Guruji and taken to his estate. 10,000 rupees were given to the three on the condition that they report what they achieved after exactly 1 year. The one who achieved the best would be gifted with Gurukripa Estate.

The trio leaves happily and Gopu loses his money gambling. Gopu marries a wealthy girl Meera, who was introduced earlier in the movie, Haunt gifts a hotel (sea land) to her and migrates to Australia. Gopu becomes the manager of the hotel. He keeps a distance from Charli and Unni, but later they are employed in that hotel on Meera's request. Swami, the fraudulent hotel manager becomes unhappy with them. Unni leaves first, followed by Charli. The hotel is closed due to staff strike, Gopu begins drinking, and has no plans to settle the strike.

When the day of reporting to Guruji arrives, Gopu meets Guruji in a drunken state and creates trouble. Unni arrives with his mute brother and states that the money was spent on his deceased father's treatment, pleading for one year more to settle the contest.

Charli does not arrive, but Betty arrives with a letter that narrates what happened to him after parting with Gopu. Charli happens to meet Betty and her mother in a hospital for blood donation (AB+) for the mother's surgery. He lives with them as, the mother sees her lost son of the same name.

A marriage proposal arrives for Betty, and the boy happens to be son of the parts dealer to whom Charli used to sell the stolen goods. The groom's party withdraws from the proposal stating, not interested as Charli has a shady past. Later, Charli gets a serious illness and dies. On his death bed, he hand over the letter to Betty and asks her to meet Guruji. In the letter Charli is anxious about Betty and Mother and requests Unni to marry her and be the light of that house. The movie ends in a candle lit cemetery, where Guruji, Gopu, Unni, and Betty are saying their prayers over the grave of Charli, and Guruji unites Unni and Betty. Gopu kneels over Charli's grave and breaks into tears.

== Cast ==
- Madhu as Guruji
- Mohanlal as Unni
- Nedumudi Venu as Charly
- Ratheesh as Gopu
- Manochithra as Meera
- Seema as Betty
- Uma Bharani as Latha
- Sukumari as Betty's Mother
- Sankaradi
- T. P. Madhavan as Hotel Manager

== Soundtrack ==
The music was composed by Jerry Amaldev and the lyrics were written by Bichu Thirumala.

No.	Song	Singers	Lyrics	Length (m:ss)
1	"Penninte Chenchundil"	K. J. Yesudas, K. S. Chithra	Bichu Thirumala	
2	"Velaankannippalliyile"	K. J. Yesudas	Bichu Thirumala	
3	"Venpakal Thirayo Nizhalaattamo"	K. J. Yesudas, Chorus	Bichu Thirumala	
