= Pranayavarnangal =

- Poster
- Directed by: Sibi Malayil
- Written by: Jayaraman Kadambat; Sachidanandan Puzhankara
- Produced by: Dinesh Panicker
- Starring: Suresh Gopi; Manju Warrier; Divya Unni; Biju Menon
- Cinematography: Santosh Thundiyil
- Edited by: L. Bhoominathan
- Music by: Vidyasagar
- Production company: Dream Makers
- Release date: 23 January 1998
- Running time: 133 minutes
- Country: India
- Language: Malayalam

Pranayavarnangal (transl.Colors of love) is a 1998 Indian Malayalam-language romantic film directed by Sibi Malayil, and written by Jayaraman Kadambat and Sachidanandan Puzhankara. The film stars Suresh Gopi, Manju Warrier, Divya Unni and Biju Menon. This film was a Super-hit at box office.

== Plot ==
Arathi is a shy girl, who is silent, a daydreamer and loves poetry whereas Maya is her roommate and best friend who is naughty and plays pranks on hostel mates. Victor loves Arathi but is afraid to express his love. At a college event, Vinayachandran who is well known to Maya's family and district collector of the city comes as the guest and he praises Aarathy after listening to her poetry. Meanwhile, Maya realizes that Arathi has a crush on Vinayan. Seeing this as an opportunity to make Aarathy come out of her shell, Maya compels her friend to write letters to Arathi posing as Vinayan. Arathi truly falls in love with Vinayan, whereas he doesn't have a clue about this. Meanwhile, Maya's parents arrange her marriage with Vinayan as he is in love with Maya. Maya also starts loving Vinayan. Soon Maya forces Arathi to forget Vinayan as she feels guilty and both friends break up. With the help of Victor, Arathi comes to meet Vinayan but realizes that he is marrying Maya. Arathi has a mental breakdown. Victor takes care of her. Vinayan visits her and tells her the truth and both the friends reunite.

== Cast ==
- Suresh Gopi as Vinayachandran
- Manju Warrier as Arathi Nair
- Divya Unni as Maya (voice by Sreeja)
- Biju Menon as Victor
- Karamana Janardanan Nair as Kunjambu, Maya's father
- E.A Rajendran as Chandran, Aarathi's brother
- Bobby Kottarakkara as Joji, postman
- Nandu as Sandeep, Victor's friend
- Kuthiravattom Pappu
- Jose Pellissery as Ashokan, principal
- Irshad as Babu, college chairman
- Praveena as Vanaja, Maya's friend
- K. G. George as Doctor
- Rema Devi as Aarathi's sister-in-law
- Roslin as Aarathi's aunt
- T.P. Radhamani as Maya's mother
- (Kripa) Remya as Aarathi's niece
- Shafna as Aarathi's niece

== Production ==
The song "Aaro Viral" was shot at University College Thiruvananthapuram.

== Soundtrack ==
Pranayavarnangal

Soundtrack album by Vidyasagar
- Released: September 6, 1997 (Audio Cassette); January 1, 1998 (Audio CD)
- Genre: Feature film soundtrack
- Label: Satyam Audios
- Producer: Vidyasagar

Vidyasagar chronology
Gamyam (1998)	Pranayavarnangal (1997)	Elavamkodu Desam (1998)

The soundtrack of the film was composed by Vidyasagar to the lyrics written by Gireesh Puthenchery and Sachidanandan Puzhankara, co-writer of the film. The songs were widely popular among the masses. The song 'Aaro Viral Neetti' was a remake of Vidyasagar's own composition 'Meetu Ennai' from the 1993 Tamil film Maathangal Ezhu. The song "Kannadi Koodum" tune was reused by R. P. Patnaik as "Toonega Toonega" in 2001 Telugu movie Manasantha Nuvve directed by V. N. Aditya. It was then reused in Tamil by Vidyasagar, Kannada and Bengali remakes of Manasantha Nuvve.

=== Track listing ===
Track	Title	Singer(s)	Lyricist	Raga
1	"Aaro Viral Neetti"	K. J. Yesudas	Gireesh Puthenchery	Ragamalika (Hamsanadam, Vrindavana Saranga)
2	"Varamanjalaadiya"	Sujatha Mohan	Sachidanandan Puzhankara	Kapi
3	"Othiri Othiri"	K. S. Chithra	Gireesh Puthenchery	
4	"Kannadi Koodum"	K. J. Yesudas, K. S. Chithra	Gireesh Puthenchery	Mohanam
5	"Aalelo Pulelo"	Chorus	Sachidanandan Puzhankara	
6	"Aaro Viral Neetti"	K. S. Chithra	Gireesh Puthenchery	Ragamalika (Hamsanadam, Vrindavana Saranga)
7	"Orukula Poo"	Suresh Gopi	Sachidanandan Puzhankara	Ragamalika (Abheri, Sudha Dhanyasi)
8	"Varamanjalaadiya"	K. J. Yesudas	Sachidanandan Puzhankara	Kapi
9	"Othiri Othiri"	Shabnam	Gireesh Puthenchery	

== Awards ==
Kerala State Film Awards

- Kerala State Film Award for Best Music Director - Vidyasagar
- Kerala State Film Award for Best Female Playback Singer - Sujatha Mohan

Kerala Film Critics Association Awards

- Kerala Film Critics Award for Best Music Director - Vidyasagar
- Kerala Film Critics Award for Best Female Playback Singer - Sujatha Mohan

Asianet Film Awards

- Asianet Film Award for Best Music Director - Vidyasagar
- Asianet Film Award for Best Female Playback Singer - Sujatha Mohan
