= Sachidanandan Puzhankara =

Indian lyricist, poet, and screenwriter

- Born: Chalakkudi, Thrisur, Kerala
- Occupation(s): Lyricist, Poet, Screenwriter
- Years active: 1998-Present
- Spouse: Elsa

Sachidanandan Puzhankara is an Indian lyricist, poet, and screenwriter who works predominantly in Malayalam. He co-wrote the lyrics and screenplay for the film Pranayavarnangal. Since then, he has written many successful songs.

== Life and career ==
Sachidanandan was born in Annanad, near Chalakudy in Thrissur district of Kerala. He studied in Maharaja's College, Ernakulam and Government Victoria College, Palakkad. He worked as an officer in KSRTC. He entered the film industry through his friend Jayaraman Kadambat. His first film was Pranayavarnangal which was directed by Sibi Malayil and music composed by Vidyasagar. In the movie Pranayavarnangal he got an opportunity for writing a poetic song named "Varamanjaladiya Ravinte Maaril".

== Filmography ==
Year	Movie	Song	Composer
1998	Pranayavarnangal	Aalelo pulelo	Vidyasagar
1998	Pranayavarnangal	Oru kulappoo pole	Vidyasagar
1998	Pranayavarnangal	Varamanjalaadiya	Vidyasagar
2001	Ishtam	Kaanumpol parayamo	Mohan Sithara
2003	Gramaphone	Oru poomazha	Vidyasagar
2005	5 Fingers	Karivalayo Changaathi	Benny Johnson
2005	5 Fingers	Chandanappon	Benny Johnson
2005	5 Fingers	Moonnu Kaalulloru Kaakkaachiye	Benny Johnson
2005	5 Fingers	Thinkal Pottu Thotta Penmaniye	Benny Johnson
2005	5 Fingers	Pachakkili	Benny Johnson
2006	Kisaan	Aalilathaali Ekaakithe Nin	Johnson, Kaithapram Viswanath
2006	Kisaan	Thappedu Kaatte	Johnson, Kaithapram Viswanath
2006	Kisaan	Jesus You Are My Savior	Johnson, Kaithapram Viswanath
2006	Kisaan	Mazha puthumazha	Johnson, Kaithapram Viswanath
2006	Kisaan	Thaalamthulli	Johnson, Kaithapram Viswanath
2006	Kisaan	Orililakale	Johnson, Kaithapram Viswanath
2007	November Rain	Raavin nenjil	Anup S Nair
2007	November Rain	Chembakappoo	Anup S Nair
2007	November Rain	Aarumaarum	Anup S Nair
2007	November Rain	Bad company	Anup S Nair
2007	November Rain	Gaanamayidaam	Anup S Nair
2007	November Rain	Dham	Anup S Nair
2007	November Rain	November rain	Anup S Nair
2010	Naayakan	Swapnathin Kunnatheri	Prashanth Pillai
2010	Naayakan	Lolalolamaayi	Prashanth Pillai
2010	Naayakan	Ranadheera	Prashanth Pillai
2011	Film Star	Kali Paranjaalum	Vijayan Poonjar
2011	Film Star	Thathe Muthe	Benny Johnson
2011	Film Star	Unmakalengo	Benny Johnson
2011	Film Star	Kadalolam Malayolam	Benny Johnson
2011	Film Star	Enakkenave	Benny Johnson
2019	Moonnam Pralayam	Pathiye Veyilin	Reghupathi
2019	Moonnam Pralayam	Alapole	Reghupathi

== Literary contributions ==
- Pachavellam (Poetry collection)
- Ivale vayikkumpol (Poetry collection)
- Adukkala (Poetry collection)
- Pacha (Poetry collection)
- Vattiyilla (Poetry collection)
- Ormmakkurippukal (Malayalam translation of Pablo Neruda's poems)
- Vazhikatti (Malayalam translation of R.K. Narayanan's novel)
- Anuranjanam (Malayalam translation of Benazir Bhutto's memoir)
