= Aavarampoo =

1992 film by Bharathan

- Theatrical release poster
- Directed by: Bharathan
- Written by: Prasanna Kumar (dialogues)
- Screenplay by: Padmarajan
- Story by: Padmarajan
- Produced by: Keyaar
- Starring: Vineeth; Nandhini; Nassar
- Cinematography: S. Kumar
- Edited by: B. Lenin; V. T. Vijayan
- Music by: Ilaiyaraaja
- Production company: K. R. Enterprises
- Release date: 5 June 1992
- Running time: 125 minutes
- Country: India
- Language: Tamil

Aavarampoo (transl. Avaram senna) is a 1992 Indian Tamil-language teen romance film, directed by Bharathan and produced by Keyaar. A remake of the 1980 Malayalam film Thakara, it stars Vineeth, Nandhini and Nassar. The film was released on 5 June 1992, and Nassar won the Tamil Nadu State Film Special Award for Best Actor.

== Plot ==
Sakkarai is a mentally ill boy and an orphan. Most of the villagers take advantage of his innocence. Sakkarai works under his chief Thevar, who has two wives. After a dispute with his first wife Lakshmi, he marries another woman. Sakkarai develops a soft corner for Thevar's daughter Thamarai. Aasari, who has been humiliated by Thamarai, brainwashes and manipulates Sakkarai. Sakkarai has a physical relation with Thamarai. Later, Thevar finds out their relationship and beats the innocent Sakkarai. Later, Thevar arranges his daughter's marriage with Senkodan, a drunkard. What transpires later forms the crux of the story.

== Cast ==
- Vineeth as Sakkarai
- Nandhini as Thamarai
- Nassar as Thevar
- Goundamani as Aasari
- Sulakshana as Thevar's second wife
- Valsala Menon as Lakshmi, Thevar's first wife
- Anu Anand as Balu
- Bayilvan Ranganathan as Bayilvan
- Sharmili as Pappa
- Indrajith
- Seena Antony
- Vichithra
- Master Deepak
- Baby Sridevi
- Bharathan in a cameo appearance

== Soundtrack ==
The soundtrack was composed by Ilaiyaraaja.

Song	Singer(s)	Lyrics	Duration
"Aalolam Paadi"	Ilaiyaraaja	Gangai Amaran	5:05
"Adukku Malli Yeduthu"	S. P. Balasubrahmanyam, S. Janaki	Gangai Amaran	5:00
"Mandhiram Idhu"	K. J. Yesudas	Pulamaipithan	6:09
"Nadhi Odum Karaiyoram"	S. Janaki	Gangai Amaran	4:53
"Saadhinchane"	Krishnachander	Tyagaraja	2:55
"Saami Kitta Solli"	S. P. Balasubrahmanyam, S. Janaki	Gangai Amaran	4:39

== Release and reception ==
Aavarampoo was released on 12 June 1992. The Indian Express wrote, "the director's touch of class is evident in every frame". Marma Yogi of Kalki praised the film's short threaded story and lack of lengthy, unnecessary dialogues. For his performance, Nassar won the Tamil Nadu State Film Special Award for Best Actor.
