= Rajan Sankaradi =

Indian film director

- Born: Rajagopal C 6 November 1953; Cherai
- Died: 1 August 2016 (aged 62); Aluva
- Occupation: Film director
- Years active: 1977-2016
- Notable work: Guruji Oru Vakku, Meenathil Thalikettu, Cleopatra
- Spouse: Usha Rajan

Rajan Sankaradi (6 November 1953–1 August 2016) was an Indian film director. He started his career as an assistant director under Balachandra Menon. He had directed the films Guruji Oru Vakku (1985), Meenathil Thalikettu (1998) and Cleopatra (2013) with prominent actors like Mohanlal and Dileep playing the leads. He also worked as associate to several prominent Malayalam filmmakers including Joshiy, Fazil and K. Madhu. He is the nephew of actor Sankaradi.

== Filmography ==
=== As director ===
- Guruji Oru Vakku (1985)
- Meenathil Thalikettu (1998)
- Cleopatra (2013)

=== As an actor ===
Year	Title	Role	Notes
1988	August 1	Sreedharan	
1989	Adhipan	Goonda	
1989	Jagratha	Fake Policeman	
1990	Marupuram	Forensic Surgeon	
