= Kannaki (film) =

2001 Malayalam language film

- Directed by: Jayaraj
- Written by: Sajeev Kilikulam
- Based on: Antony and Cleopatra
- Produced by: Mahesh Raj
- Starring: Lal; Nandita Das; Siddique; Kalpana; Geetu Mohandas; Manoj K. Jayan; Cochin Hanifa
- Cinematography: M. J. Radhakrishnan
- Edited by: N.P. Sathish
- Music by: Kaithapram Vishwanathan Nambudiri
- Production company: Neelambari Films
- Release date: 7 December 2001
- Country: India
- Language: Malayalam

Kannaki (English: The Eye) is a 2001 Indian Malayalam-language tragedy film directed by Jayaraj and written by Sanjeev Kilikulam. It stars Nandita Das, Lal, Siddique, Kalpana, Geetu Mohandas and Manoj K. Jayan. It is an adaptation of William Shakespeare's play Antony and Cleopatra. This is Jayaraj's second film adaptation of a Shakespeare play, the first being Kaliyattam (1997). Lal plays Manickam, the equivalent to Antony. Nandita Das plays Kannaki, the equivalent to Cleopatra and Manoj K. Jayan plays Gounder, Octavius Caesar's role. Nandita Das' role as Kannaki was critically acclaimed.

== Plot ==
Manickam and Choman are best friends in a local village. Manickam excels in the local game of cockfighting and has acquired the mastery of the game and of the bird. Manickam is actually fighting for Choman in his regular cockfights against the Gounder.

Kannaki likes Manickam and Choman's sister Kumudam admires him. Kannaki and Manickam become very close and he takes a decision to marry her. When Choman learns of this, he is furious. He wants Manickam to marry his sister and goes to the extent of announcing their wedding at a public function. Manickam meets Kumudam and explains to her that he has a brotherly affection to her and not of that of a lover. Kumudam is heart-broken, but maintains a level of loyalty in hope that, Manickam will realize her love. Choman is angered by all this and feels betrayed by his best friend. Choman and the Gounder has a falling-out with Kannaki.

Kannaki meanwhile, out of love, tries to get Manickam out of the local game and enviously out of the clutches of Kumudam. A local fortune teller Kanakamma keeps feeding ideas and false news into Kannaki's ears about Manickam. On her idea, Kannaki provides an untrained cock on the pretense that she had trained the cock to fight, to Manickam. Manickam takes the cock to fight, against Choman's cock. Manickam loses the fight and comes home to say Kannaki has cheated him. There she tells him she did this to have Manickam all to herself and away from Choman and the Gounder.

Choman and Gounder pair up to defeat Manickam at a local festival. They know that Manickam will come to the cock fight. When Kumudam learns of Choman and Gounder's plan, she pleads to her brother to not fight against Manickam, to which the Gounder says if she wants Manickam, they have to separate Kannaki from him. And their separation is only possible if this fight takes place.

Later, Kanakamma comes to Manickam and says Kumudam wants to meet him in private. After he goes to speak to Kumudam, Kanakamma goes inside and tell Kannaki that Manickam is cheating on her, and as proof she can go outside and see Manickam and Kumudam speaking. Meanwhile, at a distance Manickam is telling Kumudam that he still sees her as a sister, and nothing else. Kumudam says she still loves him, and they depart. Kannaki then approaches Kumudam and says, Kumudam shouldn't meet Manickam again. Kumudam lies to her that she cannot stop herself from seeing her child's father who is Manickam, and that they have met like this many times before. Kannaki is shocked and asks Kumudam what she should do, to which Kumudam says she should let Manickam come back to her.

Kannaki then sees a local snake seller, and gets the most poisonous snake from him. Later Manickam is seen gifting Kannaki with a wedding saree to wear for their wedding. He says they will marry right after the game, which he is sure to win. Kannaki dresses up as a bride, and wishes Manickam the best for the game. As soon as he leaves, she tells Ravunni to tell Manickam after the game that she left from that place, and that Manickam should forget her and marry Kumudam. He also tells Ravunni that she will be in the inside the Sarpa Kavu, waiting for Ravunni's skill in convincing Manickam, and until he tells her that Manickam left to stay with Kumudam, she will not come out.

Manickam wins the game, seriously injuring Choman's cock, and a fight erupts. Gounder runs away, and at the end of the fight, Manickam and Choman finds their friendship stronger than ever. Manickam returns home with the winning cock announcing his victory, but when Ravunni delivers Kannaki's message to him, he is grief-stricken and shocked as to why Kannaki did this to him. He locks the house, and attempts to fight with the cock. He lets the cock wound and scratch him, and continues till the cock pecks at his jugular vein on the neck. Meanwhile, Ravunni unsuccessfully tries to stop Manickam from outside the house, and runs to Kannaki. Initially, she does not come out, but when Ravunni tells her what Manickam did to himself, she comes out and goes to stop him from going crazy. Manickam dies before Kannaki reaches him. When she finds him dead, she lets out a deep wail and cry. She then removes the snake she bought earlier, and lets it bite her. She dies beside Manickam.

== Cast ==
- Nandita Das as Kannaki
- Lal as Manickam
- Geetu Mohandas as Kumudam
- Siddique as Choman
- Cochin Haneefa as Ravunni
- Manoj K. Jayan as Gounder
- Kalpana as Kanakamma
- Sajan Palluruthi as Manickam's friend

== Soundtrack ==
Film had notable songs composed by Kaithapram Vishwanathan Nambudiri, who debuted through this film, and lyrics penned by Kaithapram Damodaran Namboothiri.

Song	Lyrics	Artist	Raga(s)
"Angu Vadakku"	Kaithapram	Kuttappan, Chorus	
"Ennu Varum Nee"	Kaithapram	K. J. Yesudas	Sankarabharanam
"Ennum Varuum"	Kaithapram	K. S. Chithra	Harikambhoji
"Iniyoru Janmamundengil"	Kaithapram	K. J. Yesudas	Harikambhoji
"Karineelakkannazhaki"	Kaithapram	M. G. Sreekumar	Shuddha Dhanyasi
"Karineelakkannazhaki Kannaki" (F)	Kaithapram	K. S. Chithra	Shuddha Dhanyasi
"Kodungalooramme"	Kaithapram	M. G. Sreekumar	
"Pooparikkaan"	Kaithapram	K. J. Yesudas	Kapi

== Reception ==
A critic from Cinesouth wrote that "Ours is a culture famous for its epics. Our people have a taste of such stories that came into existence ages ago. Kannagi is just another proof of it".
