= Kambhoji (film) =

- Directed by: Vinod Mankara
- Written by: Vinod Mankara
- Story by: Vinod Mankara
- Starring: Vineeth; indrans; Lakshmi Gopalaswamy; Grace Antony; Hareesh Peradi; Sona Nair; Rachana Narayanankutty
- Cinematography: Sambu Sarma
- Edited by: Ayoob Khan
- Music by: M Jayachandran
- Release date: 30 March 2017
- Country: India
- Language: Malayalam

Kambhoji is a 2017 Indian Malayalam-Language Dance Music film written and directed by Vinod Mankara.

== Plot ==
Kambhoji tells the tragic story of Kathakali artist Kunjunni (Vineeth) and his unsuccessful love with Uma Antharjanam (Lakshmi Gopalaswamy). Kunjunni reaches Uma's house to learn Kathakali from Ravunni Menon (Hareesh Peradi), a veteran in the art form. Menon is like a family member in Uma's house and that's why he stays there to teach children Kathakali in the courtyard. A talented disciple, Kunjunni impresses Menon, who assigns Kunjunni to run the class there and leaves for his house forever to look after his only daughter. However, love blossoms between Uma and Kunjunni. Things become complicated when the murder of Narayani (Sona Nair) occurs in the village and Kunjunni gets arrested and sentenced to death.

== Cast ==
- Vineeth as Kunjunni
- Lakshmi Gopalaswamy as Uma Antharjanam
- Hareesh Peradi as Ravunni Aashan, Kathakali trainer
- Sona Nair as Narayani
- Rachana Narayanankutty as Jaanu, a servant
- Shivaji Guruvayoor as Jailor Manoj
- Grace Antony as Kunjolu, Ravunni's daughter
- Indrans as Shivaraman, Kathakali makeup artist
- Kalaranjini as Uma's mother
- Kalamandalam Sivan Namboodiri as Uma's father

== Music ==
Kambhoji

Soundtrack album by M. Jayachandran
- Released: 5 September 2016
- Genre: Film soundtrack
- Length: 33:15
- Language: Malayalam
- Label: Satyam Audios
- Producer: M. Jayachandran

The film's soundtrack album and background score are composed by M. Jayachandran. The lyrics for the songs were written by ONV Kurup, Vinod Mankara and Gopalakrishna Bharathi. The album was released on 5 September 2016 at Hyacinth hotel in Trivandrum.

The album marks Jayachandran's re-collaboration with Vinod Mankara after their successful film Karayilekku Oru Kadal Dooram (2010) for which the former won Kerala State Award for best music director. The film also marks the last works of acclaimed Malayalam poet ONV Kurup before his death. Kurup handed over his written lines to Mankara just three days before his death.

The soundtrack album has nine songs set to tune by Jayachandran and comprises popular singers like K. J. Yesudas, K. S. Chithra, Bombay Jayashree among others who have recorded their voices.

Tracklist
No.	Title	Lyrics	Singer(s)	Length
1.	"Nadavathil"	ONV Kurup	K. S. Chithra
2.	"Shruthi Cherumo"	ONV Kurup	K. J. Yesudas
3.	"Anguli Sparsham"	Vinod Mankara	Bombay Jayashree
4.	"Chenthar Nermukhi"	ONV Kurup	Sreevalsan J Menon, K. S. Chithra
5.	"Irakkam Varamal"	Gopalakrishna Bharathi	Bombay Jayashree
6.	"Harinakshi (female)"	Traditional	Nandini
7.	"Harinakshi (male)"	Traditional	Kottakkal Madhu
8.	"Olivil undo"	Traditional	Nandini
9.	"Mariman Kanni"		Kalanilayam Sinu
Total length:				33:15

== Awards ==
Kerala State Film Awards

- Best Lyrics – ONV Kurup
- Best Music Director – M Jayachandran
- Best Female Play Back Singer – K. S. Chithra
- Best Choreography – Vineeth
