= Kamamohitham =

1994 novel by C.V. Balakrishnan

- Author: C.V. Balakrishnan
- Language: Malayalam
- Genre: Fiction
- Publisher: August Books, Valapad
- Publication date: 1994
- Publication place: India

Kamamohitham is a 1994 Malayalam language novel by C.V. Balakrishnan. The novel narrates the story of Jajali, the monk and Sagaradathan in ancient India.

== Film adaptations ==
Film director K. G. George had planned a film adaptation of the novel, but the film did not take off. Another film adaptation of the novel was announced in 2015, directed by Harihardas and starring Mohanlal in a double role.
