= Vellivelichathil =

- Directed by: Madhu Kaithapram
- Written by: C. V. Balakrishnan
- Produced by: Ramesh Nambiar
- Starring: John Brittas; Iniya; Geeta Poduval
- Cinematography: Seenu Sidharth
- Edited by: Johnkutty
- Music by: Deepankuran; Bijibal
- Distributed by: Well Flow Talkies
- Release date: 19 September 2014
- Running time: 2 hours
- Country: India
- Language: Malayalam

Vellivelichathil is a 2014 Indian Malayalam film directed by Madhu Kaithapram, starring John Brittas and Iniya in the leading roles. This is the first Malayalam film to be shot entirely in Muscat, Oman.

== Plot ==
The plot revolves around the life of Upendran, played by John Brittas, who falls in love with and wishes to marry a bar dancer, played by Iniya. The lives of NRI Malayalees are portrayed by the other characters in the movie, depicting their daily struggles.

== Cast ==
- John Brittas as Upendran
- Iniya
- Geeta Poduval
- Suraj Venjaramoodu
- Lalu Alex
- Raveendran
- Tini Tom
- Sudheer Karamana
- Sreejith Ravi
- Renny Johnson
- Neena Kurup

== Music ==
The music soundtrack for the movie was released by Satyam Audios.

=== Track listing ===
Vellivelichathil

Soundtrack album by Deepankuran
- Language: Malayalam
- Label: Satyam Audios

No.	Title	Singer(s)	Length
1.	"Randupranaya"	K. S. Chitra
2.	"Baje Shahnayi"	Hariharan
3.	"Panankiliye"	Ahmed

== Reception ==
The film received mixed reviews and did not do too well in the box office. The Times of India movie reviews rated the movie with 1 and a half stars and calling Madhu Kaithapram's effort a lazy act of self-indulgence. The Satellite rights for the movie were secured by Asianet.
