= Idanilangal =

- Directed by: I. V. Sasi
- Written by: M. T. Vasudevan Nair
- Screenplay by: M. T. Vasudevan Nair
- Produced by: K. Balachander
- Starring: Mammootty; Mohanlal; Menaka; Seema
- Cinematography: N. A. Thara
- Edited by: K. Narayanan
- Music by: M. S. Viswanathan
- Production company: Kavithalayaa Productions
- Release date: 23 August 1985
- Country: India
- Language: Malayalam

Idanilangal is a 1985 Indian Malayalam-language film, directed by I. V. Sasi and produced by K. Balachander. The film stars Mammootty, Mohanlal, Seema and Menaka and . The film has musical score by M. S. Viswanathan.

== Plot ==
Chinammu (Seema) stabs her violent husband leaving him for dead and is later cast out of the household where she works as a maid when the lady of the house sees her pregnancy morning sickness. Balan (Mohanlal), a bit of a rough character, rescues her from being taken advantage of in her vulnerable state. But the gossip spreads that she is pregnant and the townspeople clamour to get rid of a woman of such ill repute.

Vijayan (Mammootty) a Public Works officer and his wife Bhanu have recently arrived and the neighbours convey the gossip to him and ask him to do something about it. Vijayan and Balan clash about Chinnammu. Vijayan asks the Police to intervene, but the local Inspector is on good terms with Balan.

Chinnammu admits to murdering her husband to Balan, who is sympathetic considering the circumstances. Meanwhile Vijayan and Bhanu plan for her pregnancy in middle class comfort despite not having family support. Balan faces rejection from his wealthy family and the girl he loves and clashes again with Vijayan over his rough ways, while Chinnammu is cast out once again and is found in the woods struggling with labour pains. Sarama (Sukumari) takes her in but the child is lost. Her difficult circumstances are contrasted with the support and stability Bhanu gets for her pregnancy. People's perceptions of how deserving the two women are of their situations are briefly mentioned in some of the village conversations.

Bhanu's labour is difficult as she gives birth to a boy but does not herself survive. Chinnammu assists with breastfeeding the baby despite reservations from Vijayan and the judgemental townsfolk.

Chinnammu wins over Vijayan with her care and helpfulness, while the townsfolk continue gossiping mercilessly with only Saramma offering resistance to the gossip. An unhappy and drunk Balan proposes to Chinnammu who does not respond. Vijayan returns home and fights Balan, but spares him at Chinnammu's request.

The daughter of one of the more judgemental townswomen, Kalikuttiyamma (Meena) is caught by Saramma fooling around with a horse hand. Saramma confronts the girl about her behaviour but maintains discretion.

Chinnammu confronts Vijayan about his coldness towards his own child whom he refuses to touch. Vijayan confronts his grief at the loss of his wife and his blaming his baby son for it. He finally shows affection to his child and continues to soften towards Chinnammu as he offers her a job as the child's nanny.

It turns out Chinnammu's husband, Kuttappan, is still alive as he turns up at the local brothel and liquor store. He confronts Chinnammu at Vijayan's home and threatens her to get her to return to their house. He tells her to meet him at the bus stop at night.

Chinnammu who is rattled by her husband's threats, lies unconvincingly to Vijayan who is angered by her evident dishonesty.

Chinnammu decides to try to escape but is chased to Balan's house by Kuttappan. Vijayan turns up at Balan's house in a rage accompanied by townsfolk demanding to know where his child is. He fights Balan. Chinnammu begs them to stop fighting because she knows Kuttappan probably kidnapped the child as leverage to get her back. This hunch is correct. Kuttappan is confronted at the bus stop with the child. Balan and Vijayan fight him and he stabs Balan. Ultimately, Chinnammu stabs Kuttappan and kills him.

The movie ends with Chinnammu in custody but assured of full support from Vijayan and Balan.

== Cast ==
- Mammootty as Vijayan
- Mohanlal as Balan
- Seema as Chinnammu
- Vineeth as Kunjumon
- Sukumari as Saramachettathi
- Shubha as Madhavi
- Bhagyalakshmi
- Jagannatha Varma
- Janardanan
- Raveendran as Maniyan
- Kundara Johnny as Kuttappan
- Kuthiravattam Pappu as Thamapilla
- Meena as Kalikuttiyamma
- Paravoor Bharathan
- Ranipadmini as Subhadra
- Menaka as Bhanu

== Soundtrack ==
The music was composed by M. S. Viswanathan and the lyrics were written by S. Ramesan Nair.

No.	Song	Singers	Lyrics	Length (m:ss)
1	"Indrachaapathin Njaanazhinju"	K. J. Yesudas	S. Ramesan Nair	
2	"Vayanaadan Manjalinu"	P. Susheela	S. Ramesan Nair	
