= The Book of Passing Shadows =

Novel by C. V. Balakrishnan

Ayussinte Pusthakam
- Book cover
- Author: C. V. Balakrishnan
- Language: Malayalam, English
- Genre: Contemporary Fiction, South Asian Culture, Literary Fiction
- Publisher: DC Books (Malayalam); Niyogi Books (English)
- Publication date: April 1984 (Malayalam); 5 October 2021 (English)
- Publication place: India
- Media type: Print (hardback and paperback)
- Pages: 232 pp (English paperback edition)

Ayussinte Pusthakam (transl. The Book of Passing Shadows) (Malayalam: ആയുസ്സിന്റെ പുസ്തകം), is a well-known Indian Malayalam language novel by C. V. Balakrishnan.

== Development ==
=== Writing ===
Balakrishnan began writing this novel when he moved to Calcutta in late-1970s. An old edition of the Bible at St. Paul's Cathedral in Calcutta triggered the book in him. It took him three years to complete the novel. Says the author: "All the characters and villages of Christian settlers were in my mind long before I began thinking about writing Ayussinte Pusthakam. The characters are based on people I met during my course as a school teacher in a village in Kasaragod. I wrote Ayussinte Pusthakam at a time when I was going through an emotionally difficult period; my relation with my father was strained and I was feeling very lonely. Ayussinte Pusthakam is about loneliness. The book is also about sin and sadness, written in a style and language that have been judiciously borrowed from The Bible." The protagonist in this novel is Yohannan, and the plot revolves around his ambiguities concerning sexual desire.

=== Translations ===
Ayussinte Pusthakam has been translated into Tamil and English since its publication in 1984. Following is a list containing information about the translated works.

Language	Title	Publisher	Publishing date	Translator	Reference
Tamil	உயிர்ப் புத்தகம் (Uyir Puththagam)	Kizhakku Pathippagam	2007	V. Krishnamurthy	
English	The Book of Passing Shadows	Niyogi Books	2021	T.M. Yesudasan	

==== English translation ====
The book was translated from Malayalam into English by T.M. Yesudasan, a former associate professor and head, Department of English, CMS College Kottayam. He has contributed to journals and anthologies on literary and cultural studies including the Penguin collection, No Alphabet in Sight: New Dalit Writing from South India.

== Adaptations ==
=== Drama ===
The novel was adapted into an experimental play by Suveeran. The play received Kerala Sangeeta Nataka Akademi Award of 2008, and participated in several international festivals.
