= Swara (disambiguation) =

Swara is a concept in Indian classical music.

Swara may also refer to:

- Swara, Nepal, a town
- Swara (custom) or Vani, a forced marriage custom in parts of Pakistan
- Swara (film), a 2023 Sri Lankan film
- SWARA, an African wildlife conservation magazine
- Swara Bhasker (born 1988), Indian film actress

== See also ==
- Sargam (disambiguation)
- Sa Re Ga Ma Pa Dha Ni (disambiguation)
