= Madhu Kaithapram =

Indian film director

- Born: 1970; Kaithapram, Kannur district, Kerala, India
- Died: 29 December 2014 (aged 43–44); Kozhikode, Kerala, India
- Occupation: Film director
- Years active: 2006 – 2014

Madhu Kaithapram was an Indian film director who worked primarily in the Malayalam film industry based in Kerala. He made his directorial debut with the feature film Ekantham in 2006 that won him the National Film Award for the best debutant director and followed it up with the critically acclaimed Madhya Venal (2009) and the family-drama Orma Mathram (2011). His last venture Velli Velichathil was released on 19 September 2014. He died on 29 December 2014. He was under treatment for diabetes.

== Filmography ==
Year	Film	Cast	Notes
2006	Ekantham	Thilakan, Murali	Indira Gandhi Award for Best Debut Film of a Director; Kerala State Film Award (Special Jury Award)
2009	Madhya Venal	Manoj K. Jayan, Shweta Menon	Kerala Film Critics Association Awards for the Film with Social Relevance and Commitment
2011	Orma Mathram	Dileep, Priyanka, Master Sidharth	
2014	Vellivelichathil	Iniya, John Brittas	First Malayalam film shot in Oman
