= Sargam (1992 film) =

- Poster designed by Gayathri Ashokan
- Directed by: Hariharan
- Screenplay by: Hariharan
- Produced by: Bhavani Hariharan
- Starring: Vineeth; Manoj K. Jayan; Rambha
- Cinematography: Shaji N. Karun
- Edited by: M. S. Mani
- Music by: Bombay Ravi
- Production company: Gayathri Cinema Enterprises
- Distributed by: Manorajyam Release
- Release date: 10 April 1992
- Country: India
- Language: Malayalam

Sargam is a 1992 Indian Malayalam-language musical drama film written and directed by Hariharan and produced by his wife, Bhavani Hariharan. Chowallur Krishnankutty wrote the dialogues. The film features Vineeth, Manoj K. Jayan, and Rambha (in her Malayalam film debut), while Nedumudi Venu, Soumini/Srikanya, Urmila Unni, V. K. Sriraman, Thilakan, and Oduvil Unnikrishnan play supporting roles. Shaji N. Karun did the cinematography, while Bombay Ravi composed the soundtrack and M. S. Mani handled the editing. The movie was the third highest-grossing movie of the year. It won the National Film Award for Best Popular Film Providing Wholesome Entertainment and three Kerala State Film Awards: Best Director (Hariharan), Second Best Actor (Manoj K. Jayan), and Best Music Director (Bombay Ravi). It was remade in Telugu as Sarigamalu with Vineeth, Manoj K. Jayan, and Rambha reprising their roles.

== Plot ==
Kuttan Thampuran is the son of Subhadra Thampuratti and Kochanyian Thampuran of the Maangaattu Kovilakam. Kuttan has suffered from epilepsy since childhood. He is rough and violent in his character and is feared by all in the village. Haridas is his classmate despite being two years younger and has had a special bond with him since childhood. Hari always accompanies Kuttan and carries iron keys to assist him if a seizure develops. Both Hari and Kuttan grow up to be unsuccessful in life, and Hari is criticized for this by his father Bhagavathar, a well-known classical singer who himself has not been financially successful. Hari has had a liking for music, but Bhagavathar discourages him from it and persuades him to pursue a professional degree course. Kuttan, meanwhile, has had frequent epileptic seizures and is a nuisance in both his home and the village, despite seeking various medical treatments.

Unknown to Bhagavathar, Hari has a natural singing talent, which he displays at the local temple. Thankamani, who is dependent on Illam, is a student of Bhagavathar and falls for Hari after she hears him sing. Hari, though initially reluctant towards Thankamani, soon develops a passionate relationship with her based on mutual interest in music. Kuttan tells Hari that he is the only person who loves him, and they reaffirm their brotherly love. Meanwhile, Thekkemadom Nampoothiri advises that the only treatment for Kuttan is to get married. Both Valiya Thampuran and Thampuratti plan to get Thankamani married to Kuttan. Kuttan agrees to this, unaware of the affair between Hari and Thankamani. Thampuratti persuades Hari to forget Thankamani and leave the village for Kuttan's sake. Kuttan is devastated after coming to know about everything after their marriage and commits suicide.

Years later, an aging Thampuratti calls for Hari, who has now become a well-known singer in India, to visit her. Hari's visit to the village and subsequent happenings form the rest of the story. Meanwhile, Thankamani is paralyzed and unable to speak, probably from the shock of her forced marriage and then the subsequent suicide of her husband, Kuttan.

When Hari sings "Raaga Sudharasa" for Thampuratti, then hearing his voice, Thankamani attempts to sing along. Soon, she displays signs of getting cured. Thampuratti passes on, relieved that Thankamani can be reunited with Hari.

== Cast ==
- Vineeth as Haridas
- Manoj K. Jayan as Kuttan Thampuran
- Rambha as Thankamani (credited as Amrutha)
- Soumini as Nandini
- Urmila Unni as Subhadra Thampurati, Kuttan's mother
- V. K. Sriraman as Kochanyian Thampuran, Kuttan's father
- Nedumudi Venu as Bhagavathar, Haridas's father
- Thilakan as Thekkemadom Nampoothiri
- Oduvil Unnikrishnan as Valiya Thampuran
- Renuka as Kunjulakshmi
- Santhakumari as Thankamani's mother
- Ravi Vallathol as Kunjulakshmi's husband
- Jagannatha Varma as Warrier Master
- B.Harikumar as Sheshadri
- Anila Sreekumar as Maid
- Mariza as Mariza

== Soundtrack ==
Sargam

Soundtrack album by Bombay Ravi
- Released: October 1991
- Studio: Tharangini, Chennai
- Genre: Film soundtrack
- Label: Tharangini Records

Bombay Ravi chronology
Vidhyarambham (1990)	Sargam (1991)	Ghazal (1993)

The acclaimed soundtrack of this movie was composed by Bombay Ravi, for which the lyrics were penned by Yusufali Kechery and also selections from traditionals.

No.	Song	Singer(s)	Lyricist	Raga
1	"Pravahame"	K. J. Yesudas, Chorus	Yusuf Ali Kechery	Shuddha Dhanyasi (with traces of Abheri)
2	"Kannadi Aadyamayen"	K. S. Chithra	Yusuf Ali Kechery	Kalyani
3	"Aandholanam"	K. J. Yesudas, K. S. Chithra	Yusuf Ali Kechery	Kedaragaula
4	"Bhooloka Vaikunda"	K. J. Yesudas	Traditional (Ragam Thanam Pallavi - Pallavi)	Todi
5	"Krishna Kripa Sagaram"	K. J. Yesudas, K. S. Chithra	Yusuf Ali Kechery	Charukesi
6	"Kannadi Aadyamayen"	K. J. Yesudas	Yusuf Ali Kechery	Kalyani
7	"Minnum Ponnin Kireedam"	K. S. Chithra	Traditional (C. V. Vasudeva Bhattathiri)	Chakravakam
8	"Raaga Sudharasa"	K. J. Yesudas, K. S. Chithra	Traditional (Tyagaraja)	Andholika
9	"Padmanabha Parama Purusha"(starting from "Udadhi Nivaasa")	K. J. Yesudas, Chorus	Traditional (Purandara Dasa)	Malahari
10	"Sree Saraswathi"	K. S. Chithra	Traditional (Muthuswami Dikshitar)	Arabhi
11	"Sangeethame"	K. J. Yesudas	Yusuf Ali Kechery	Jaunpuri

== Awards ==
National Film Awards

- National Film Award for Best Editing - M.S. Mani
- Best Popular Film Providing Wholesome Entertainment

Kerala State Film Awards

- Best Director - Hariharan
- Second Best Actor - Manoj K. Jayan
- Best Music Director - Bombay Ravi

Filmfare Awards South

- Filmfare Award for Best Film - Malayalam - Bhavani Jayakumar
