= K. P. Suveeran =

Indian film director

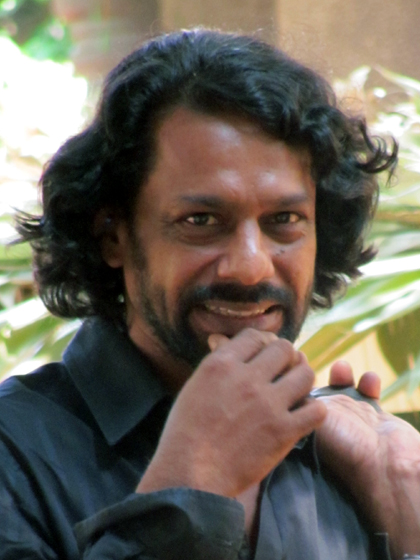
K. P. Suveeran

K. P. Suveeran is a film and drama director from Kozhikode. His first movie Byari won the National Film Award for Best Film in 2011. This is the first feature film to be made in the Beary language.

== Biography ==
Suveeran is a native of Azhiyur, Kozhikode. After completing his course at the School of Drama and Fine Arts and the School of Performing Arts, Pondicherry, though he was expelled from the National School of Drama, Delhi in his final year. Recognized as an actor, director and painter, he has to his credit almost thirty plays and four short films which have also received many awards. He has also published articles in leading periodicals in Kerala, published many short stories and a novelette and translated the plays Yerma, Island and Crime Passional into Malayalam.

Suveeran started his career as a director in Malayalam amateur drama, and first came to notice with his plays Agni, and Udambadokkolam. He secured the Sangeetha Nataka Academy awards for three years and the Mahindra Excellence in Theatre Award in 2011 for his latest drama Ayussinte Pusthakam.

== Filmography ==
- Byari
- Mazhayathu

== Awards and recognition ==
- National Film Award for Best Feature Film, India, 2011 - Byari
- SAARC Best Feature Film (Bronze), 2012 - Byari
- Theatre Award, 2011 - Ayussinte Pusthakam
- Kerala Sangeetha Nataka Akademi Award, 2019
- Recipient of Ladly National Media Award
- Bharathan Purasaaram
- Drishya Kala Ratna
