= Manoj K. Jayan =

Indian actor

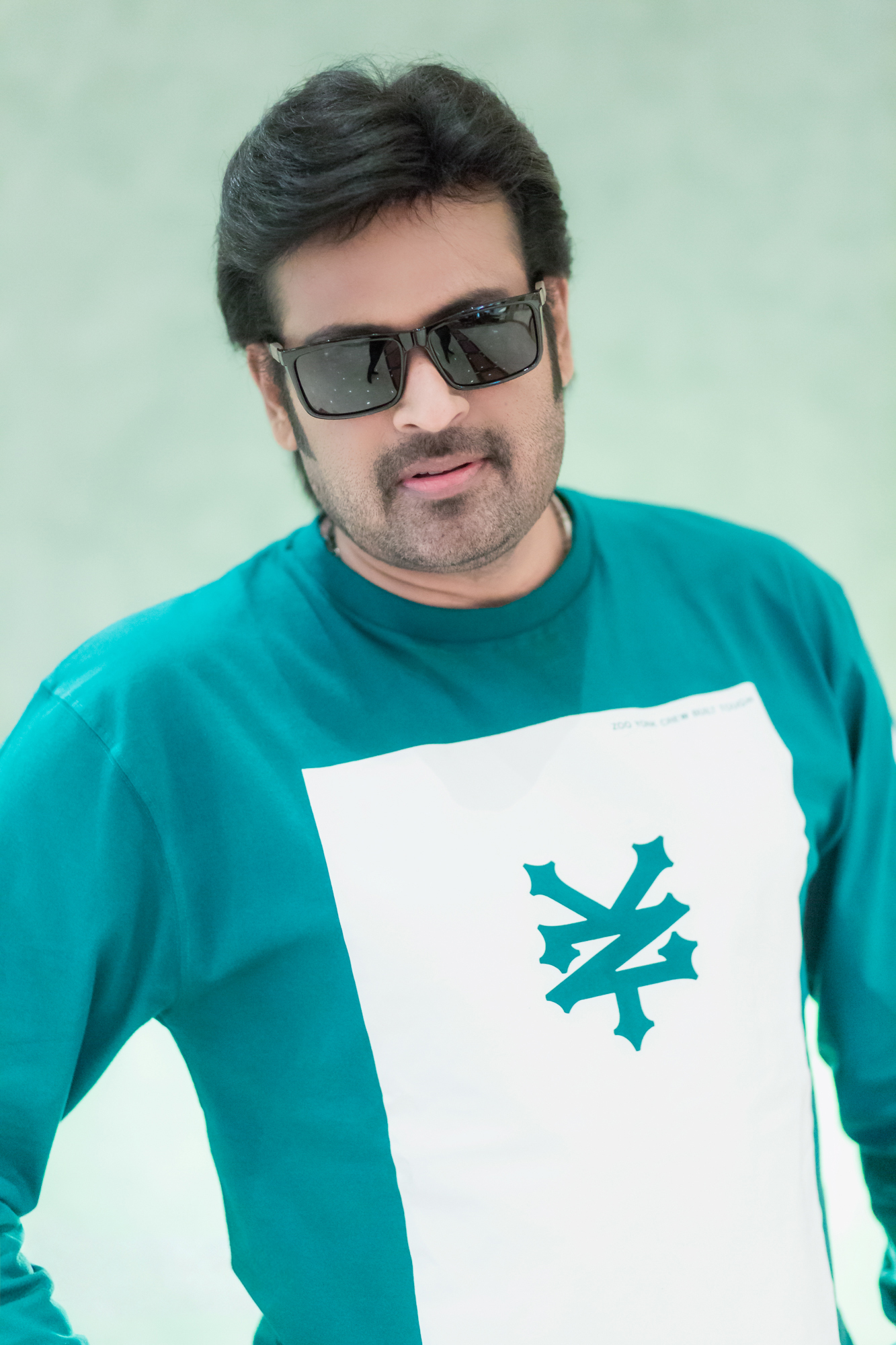
- Manoj in 2016
- Born: Manoj Kadampoothramadam Jayan; 15 March 1966 (age 60); Kottayam, Kerala, India
- Education: Southern Film Institute, Trivandrum
- Years active: 1988–present
- Spouses: Urvashi (m. 2000; div. 2008); Asha (m. 2011)
- Children: 2
- Father: K. G. Jayan

Manoj Kadampoothramadam Jayan, also known as Manoj K. Jayan, is an Indian actor who works in Malayalam films and has also appeared in a few Tamil films. Manoj has won the Kerala State Film Award for Second Best Actor three times for his portrayals of Hariharan's "Kuttan Thampuran" in Sargam (1992), "Thalakkal Chandu" in Pazhassi Raja (2009) and "Kunjiraman" in Farook Abdul Rahiman's Kaliyachan. He has played "Kuttan Thampuran" (Sargam), "Thirumangalath Neelakandan Namboothiri" (Perumthachan), "Kunjunni Namboothiri" (Parinayam), "Unnikrishnan" (Venkalam), "Ananthakrishna Warrier" (Sopanam), "Digambaran" (Anandabhadram) and "Thalakkal Chandu" (Pazhassi Raja).

== Early life and career ==
Manoj K. Jayan was born on 15 March 1966 to and V. K. Sarojini and Carnatic musician K. G. Jayan of the Kadampoothramadam family, in Kottayam, Kerala, India. He has an elder brother, Biju K Jayan, a musician. He graduated from Government College, Kottayam. After completing his studies, he joined the Southern Film Institute in Trivandrum to study acting. Although Manoj debuted with a small role in 1987 movie Ente Sonia, he was cast as the lead actor in Mamalakalkkappurathu (1988). However, Ente Sonia was never released theatrically.

== Personal life ==
Manoj was married to actress Urvashi, whom he divorced in 2008. They have a daughter together. In 2011, he married Asha, and the couple has a son. He also has a stepdaughter from Asha's first marriage.

== Filmography ==
=== Malayalam ===
Year	Title	Role	Notes
1988	Mamalakalkkappurathu	Naxalite	
1988	Ente Sonia		
1990	Anantha Vruthantham	Kishore	
1990	Marupuram	Albey	
1990	Prosecution	Rajendran	
1991	Chanchattam	Babu	
1991	Nettippattam	Freddy	
1991	Sundhari Kakka	Gang leader	
1991	Kadalora Kattu	Babychan	
1991	Chakravarthy	Thampi	
1991	Perumthachan	Thirumagalathu Neelakandan Namboothiri	
1992	Kudumbasametham	Sivashankaran	
1992	Sargam	Kuttan Thampuran	
1992	Kallanum Polisum	Kallan	
1992	Snehasagaram	Muthu	
1992	Utsava Melam	Singer	
1992	Valayam	Ravi	
1992	Pandu Pandoru Rajakumari	Vishnu	
1993	Ghazal	Vandikaran Khadar	
1993	Sopanam	Ananthakrishna Warrior	
1993	Ithu Manju Kaalam	Gopi	
1993	Chamayam	Anto	
1993	O' Faby	SI Siby	
1993	Samooham	Majeed	
1993	Venkalam	Unnikrishnan	
1994	Sukrutham	Rajendran	
1994	Palayam	Noble	
1994	Pidakkozhi Koovunna Noottandu	Sachidanandan	
1994	Bheesmacharya	Dilip	
1994	Parinayam	KunjunniNamboodiri	
1994	Prathakshinam	Unni	
1994	Vardhakya Puranam	Jayan	
1995	Ezharakoottam	CI Viswanathan	
1995	Thumboli Kadappuram	Willams	
1995	Agrajan	Aravindhan	
1996	Kanchanam	James Antony	
1996	Kumkumacheppu	Jayadevan	
1996	Mookkilla Rajyathu Murimookkan Rajavu	Mukundan	
1996	Sallapam	Divakaran	
1996	Manthrika Kuthira	Advocate	
1996	Pallivathuckal Thommichan	Dharmaraj	
1996	Swarnakireedam	Achutty	
1997	Asuravamsam	Palayam Murukan	
1997	Churam	Kunjunni	
1997	Kannur	Karivalloor Sivankutty	
1997	Shibiram	Kochu Varkey/Sajan	
1997	Vaachalam	Sekharankutty	
1997	Sammanam	Viswanathan	
1998	Panchaloham	Paramu	
1998	Ilamura Thamburan	Ananthapadmanabhan	
1998	Kalapam	Bharathan	
1998	Aaghosham	Rex Isaac	
1998	Manjukalavum Kazhinju	Reghu	
1999	Sparsham	Mahi	
1999	Aayiram Meni	Babu	
1999	Prempujari	Singer	Guest appearance
2000	Punaradhivasam	Agricultural Officer	
2000	Valliettan	Dasan	
2001	Praja	David IPS	
2001	Saivar Thirumeni	Mithran	
2001	Unnathangalil	Micheal	
2001	Ravanaprabhu	Sivadasan MLA	
2002	Kannaki	Gounder	
2002	Phantom	Sub Inspector Sebastian	
2002	Krishna Gopalakrishna	Dr. Jacob	
2002	Thandavam	Dasappan Gaunder	
2002	Kattuchembakam	SP Rajendra Varma	
2003	Mayamohithachandran		
2003	Saphalam	Govind Shankar	
2004	Vajram	Dracula	
2004	Koottu	Hameed Khan	
2004	Kaazhcha	Vallakaaran Joy	
2004	Natturajavu	Antappan	
2005	Udayon	Pottan Pathru	
2005	Ananthabhadram	Digambaran	
2005	Rajamanikyam	Raja Selvam	
2005	Arunam	Achuthan	
2005	Deepangal Sakshi	Vinod	
2006	Photographer	Circle Inspector	
2006	Ennittum	Prof. Jayadevan	
2006	Smart City	Sharath Chandran	
2006	Bada Dosth	Zakir Ali	
2006	Pathaka	Hari Narayanan IPS	
2007	Rock & Roll	Saidapet Giri	
2007	Ekantham	Dr. Sunny	
2007	Naalu Pennungal	Ouseppu	
2007	Time	Durgadasan	
2007	Mayavi	Balan	
2007	Big B	Eddy John Kurishinkal	
2008	Jubilee	CBI Officer	
2008	Kanichukulangarayil CBI	CBI officer Arjun	
2008	Crazy Gopalan	Babu John	
2008	Twenty:20	Mahindran	
2008	Akasha Gopuram	Alex	
2008	Mizhikal Sakshi	Aditya Varma	
2008	Oru Pennum Randaanum	Raman Pillai	
2008	Rathri Mazha	Vivek	
2009	Kavyam	Ananthakrishna Bhagavathar	
2009	Madhyavenal	Sakhavu Kumaran	
2009	Chemistry	Bhadran Namboodhiri	
2009	Pazhassi Raja	Thalakkal Chanthu	
2009	Sagar Alias Jackie Reloaded	Manu	
2009	Chattambinadu	Mallanchira Chandramohan	
2009	Winter	Psychiatrist	
2009	Moz & Cat	Panickar Das	
2010	Dhrona 2010	Maniyankottu Girishan	
2010	Kayam	Choonda	
2010	24 Hours	Underworld Don, Ikhthar	
2010	Nirakazhcha	Sreekuttan	
2010	Thoovalkattu	Sundaran	
2010	Paattinte Palazhy	Ameer	
2011	Seniors	Rashid Munna	
2011	Vellaripravinte Changathi	Krishnan	
2012	Njanum Ente Familiyum	John Paileykunnel	
2012	Mallu Singh	Pappan	
2012	Thattathin Marayathu	Sub-Inspector Premkumar	
2012	Ardhanari	Manjula	
2013	Lokpal	SP Vijayan	
2013	Ladies & Gentleman	Anoop	
2013	6 B Paradise	Aadhithyan	
2013	Kaliyachan	Kunjiraman	
2013	Kadal Kadannu Oru Maathukutty	Himself	
2013	Neram	Rayban	Bilingual film; Simultaneously shot in Tamil
2013	Cleopatra	Novelist Ramdas	
2013	Kadhaveedu	Qadir	
2014	Konthayum Poonoolum	Sethu	
2014	Onnum Mindathe	Panchara Jose	
2014	Homely Meals	Sarath Chandran	
2014	Asha Black	Senthil	
2014	Nagara Varidhi Naduvil Njan	Suresh	
2015	Mariyam Mukku	Mariyanasan	
2015	Samrajyam II: Son of Alexander	Stephen Antony	
2015	Namasthe Bali	Sunny	
2015	Chirakodinja Kinavukal	Director Raghoouthaman	
2015	Negalukal	Darappan	
2015	Vishwasam Athallae Ellaam	A.C.P Prithyraj Singh I.P.S	
2015	Kukkiliyar	Wanderer	
2015	Beware of Dogs	Baptist	
2015	Thilothama	CI Rana	
2016	Sahapadi 1975	Narikkodu Narayanan	
2016	Valleem Thetti Pulleem Thetti	Neer	
2017	Solo	Bhadhran	Bilingual film; Simultaneously shot in Tamil
2017	Tharangam	Antony Gonsalvez	
2017	Zacharia Pothen Jeevichirippundu	Zacharia Pothen	
2017	Crossroad	Driver	
2017	Sadrishya Vakyam	Issac Antony	
2017	Vilakkumaram	Gireesh	
2018	Bonsai	Madhusoodhanan Nair	
2018	My Story	Williams	
2018	Mazhayathu	Circle Inspector	
2019	Irupathiyonnaam Noottaandu	Baba	
2019	An International Local Story	Shivan	
2019	Vishudha Pusthakam	Raj Subramaniam	
2019	Thottappan	Fr. Peter	
2019	Evidey	Symphony Zacaria	
2019	Pathinettaam Padi	Stanlin Moore	
2019	Ganagandharvan	Kalasadhan Titto	
2021	Aaha	Gee Varghese Ashan	
2021	Vidhi: The Verdict		
2022	Salute	DySP Ajith Karunakaran	
2022	Louis		
2022	Ente Mazha	Balu	
2022	Shefeekkinte Santhosham	Ayurveda Doctor	
2022	Malikappuram	SI Haneef	
2023	Higuita	M.V. Gopinathan	
2023	Jailer	Superintendent of Police	
2024	Aanandhapuram Diaries	Adv. Easwar	
2024	Thankamani	Mani Peter	
2024	Nunakuzhi	Sundarnath	
2025	Rekhachithram	Vincent	
2025	Lovely	Magistrate	
2025	United Kingdom of Kerala	Madhavan	
2025	Dheeran	Bombay Aruvi	
2025	Mehfil	Sethu	
2025	Karam	Mahendran	
2026	Thudakkam		

=== Tamil ===
Year	Title	Role	Notes
1991	Thalapathi	Manoharan	
2002	Game	Lenin	
2003	Dhool	Inspector Karunakaran	
2003	Thirumalai	Arasu	
2004	Vishwa Thulasi	Shiva	
2004	Azhagesan	Landlord's son	
2004	Jana	ACP Rajasekhar	
2005	Thirupaachi	ACP Rajaguru	
2005	Mannin Maindhan	Bhairavamoorthy	
2005	Aanai	Jayaram	
2006	Sudesi	Private Detective Thilak	
2006	Thiruttu Payale	Businessman Sivaraj	
2006	Thimiru	Periya Karuppu	
2007	Sringaram	Mirasdar Sukumar	
2007	Dhandayuthapani	Thamizharasu	
2008	Sadhu Miranda	Rowdy Davidraj	
2008	Ko	Raghavan	
2008	Ellam Avan Seyal	Doctor	
2009	Villu	Inspector Joseph	
2009	Thee	ACP Jayan	
2009	Ragavan	Lakshmipathi	
2012	Billa II	Koteeswara "Koti" Rao	
2014	Nee Naan Nizhal	Senthil Nathan	
2016	Meendum Oru Kadhal Kadhai	SI	
2017	Solo	Bhadran	
2018	Pattinapakkam	James Thomas	

=== Telugu ===
Year	Title	Role	Notes
1993	Sarigamalu	Kittappa	
2003	Veede	Venkiteshwara Rao	
2006	Naidu LLB		
2008	Souryam	Shivaram Gowd	

== Television ==
List of television credits
Year	Title	Director
1988	Kumilakal	Adam Ayub
1989	Devamanohari Nee	Shajiyem
1989	Vaitharani	P.Bhaskaran
1990	Samaganam	N. Sankaran Nair
1990	Pankiyamma	

== Awards ==
List of awards received by Manoj K. Jayan
Year	Title	Award
1992	Perumthachan	Film Artsclub Award
1993	Sargam	Kerala State Film Award (Second Best Actor); Film Critics Award; Film Chamber Award; Madras Lion's Club Award
1994	Chamayam, Sopanam	Film Critics Award
1994	Chamayam	Film Artsclub Award
2004	Thirumalai (Tamil)	Variety Cinema Award (Best Villain)
2006	Ananthabhadram	Film Critics Award (Best Actor); Amritha Award (Second Best Actor); Sathyan Smaraka Award (Best Supporting Actor)
2010	Pazhassi Raja	Kerala State Film Award (Second Best Actor); Film Fare Award (Best Supporting Actor); Ujala Asianet Award (Special Jury Award); The Exo Mathrubhumi Amrita Film Award (Best Supporting Actor); SathyanSmaraka Award (Best Actor); Amma Award Dubai (Best Supporting Actor); The Mumbai Malayalam Film Awards (Best Supporting Actor); JaiHind TV Award (Best Supporting Actor); South Scope Cine Awards (Best Supporting Actor); Bharath Murali Award (Best Actor)
2010	Madhyavenal, Thoovalkattu	Film Critics Award (Special Jury Award)
2012	Vellaripravinte Changathi	Asia vision award (Special Jury Award)
2012	Ardhanari	Jaycey Foundation Award 2012(Second Best Actor); Ujala Asianet Award (Special Jury Award); Sreekrishna Natya Sangeetha Academy Award(Chalachitra Prathibha Puraskaram); Padmasree Thilakan Puraskaram at Riyadh (Saudi Arabia)
2012	Kaliyachan	Kerala State Film Award (Second Best Actor); Mumbai Malayali Award (Special Jury Award)
2012	Various films	JaiHind TV Award (Versatile Actor); IMAQ Award (Versatile Actor)
2015	Various Films	Bharath gopi Award (Life Time Achievement)
2016	Various Films	Lions Club International Calicut (Abhinaya Sreshta Puraskaram)
2016	Negalukal,Kukkiliyar	Film Critics Award (Best Actor)
2016	Various Films	Kairali TV BAHU MUGHA Prathibha Puraskaram (QATAR)
2016	Kaliyachan	Outstanding Performer of the year (ANAND TV Film Award London)

=== Other awards ===
- 2020 - Abraham Lincoln Paramount Literary Award by The International Peace Council United States for his contributions towards cinema, cultural and social works.
- 2021 – Granted the UAE Golden Visa in recognition of his contributions to Indian cinema.

== Playback singer ==
List of film playback singer credits
Year	Film/Album	Song(s)	Co-Singer(s)	Lyricist	Music Director
1993	Ayyappatheertham	Pamba Ganapathiye, Deepam Kandu, Malamukalundoru swamy, Azhuthanadiyozhukku	Solo	MD Rajendran, PC Aravindan	Kalarathnam K G Jayan (Jaya vijaya)
2001	Saiver Thirumeni	Allikkallilu Vellam Kootti	Solo	Gireesh Puthenchery	Raveendran
2011	Mazhanrutham	Mazhayil Nin	Solo	Sohanlal	Pradeep Somasundaram
2013	Pranavamalhar	Melle, Husbi Rubbi	Solo	Jaleel	Sidharth Vijayan
2014	Onnum Mindathe	Thathinantha	Solo	V R Santhosh	Anil Johnson
