= Thakara =

- Poster
- Directed by: Bharathan
- Written by: P. Padmarajan
- Produced by: V. V. Babu
- Starring: Prathap Pothan; Surekha; Nedumudi Venu; K. G. Menon
- Cinematography: Ashok Kumar
- Edited by: N. P. Suresh
- Music by: M. G. Radhakrishnan (Songs); Johnson (Background score)
- Production company: Jovial Films
- Distributed by: Sagarika Release
- Release date: 28 September 1979
- Country: India
- Language: Malayalam

Thakara is a 1979 Indian Malayalam-language drama film directed by Bharathan and written by Padmarajan. It stars Prathap Pothan, Surekha, Nedumudi Venu and K. G. Menon in pivotal roles. The film was a breakthrough in the career of Bharathan and Venu. It was remade in Tamil as Aavarampoo (1992).

== Plot ==
Thakara (Prathap Pothan) is an orphan. He is mentally immature, but clean hearted. He has a close relationship with the fickling Subhashini (Surekha), the dream girl of the village, who often confuses men with her sexual teasing. Thakara was betrayed by the words of Chellappanashari (Nedumudi Venu) and indulges in a physical relationship with Subhashini. Subhashini's father Mathu Mooppan (K. G. Menon) finds out their relation and beats Thakara unconscious and injures him severely. Thakara, fully filled with revenge on Mooppan, runs away. Once he earns enough money to buy a knife, he returns and kills Mooppan. Subhashini refuses to go with Thakara, who proposes to her after killing her father. With no way to escape, Thakara finds his end in front of a running train.

== Cast ==
- Prathap Pothan as Thakara
- Surekha as Subhashini (Voice dubbed by KPAC Lalitha)
- Nedumudi Venu as Chellappanasari
- K. G. Menon as Mooppan
- Anirudhan as Pullai
- Sreelatha Namboothiri as Kamakshi
- Santha Devi as Subhashini's mother

== Production ==
Initially, writer Padmarajan chose Bharat Gopy for the role of Maathu Mooppan, but he declined the offer saying he is not interested in doing "commercial films". Later, they had a discussion on the matter a day before the shooting of Padmarajan's Peruvazhiyambalam on which Gopy agreed to act on his insistence, after that meeting Gopy changed his views and began appearing in mainstream films as well. In his book Abhinayam Anubhavam published in 1994, Gopy recalls that, it was Padmarajan, who is younger than me, made me realise that there is no commercial or art film, but only good and bad films.

== Soundtrack ==
The music was composed by M. G. Radhakrishnan and the lyrics were written by Poovachal Khader.

| No. | Song | Singers | Lyrics | Length (m:ss) |
|---|---|---|---|---|
| 1 | "Kudayolam Bhoomi" | K. J. Yesudas, S. Janaki | Poovachal Khader | |
| 2 | "Mouname" | S. Janaki | Poovachal Khader | |

== Awards ==
- Filmfare Award for Best Film - Malayalam won by V.V. Babu (1979)
