= Sarigamalu =

- DVD cover
- Directed by: Kranthi Kumar
- Written by: Hariharan
- Based on: Sargam by Hariharan
- Produced by: C. Vinaya Kumari; K. Sarada Devi
- Starring: Vineeth; Manoj K. Jayan; Rambha
- Cinematography: Hari Anumolu
- Edited by: A. Sreekar Prasad
- Music by: Bombay Ravi
- Production company: Gayathri Cinema Enterprises
- Distributed by: Sri Vijetha Films
- Release date: 27 November 1993
- Running time: 119 minutes
- Country: India
- Language: Telugu

Sarigamalu is a 1993 Indian Telugu-language musical drama film directed by Kranthi Kumar and written by Hariharan. It is a remake of Hariharan's 1992 Malayalam film Sargam. The film stars Vineeth (in his Telugu debut), Manoj K. Jayan, and Rambha, while J. V. Somayajulu, P. J. Sarma, and Tanikella Bharani play supporting roles.

== Plot ==
Kitappa is the son of Sathyavathi. Kitappa has suffered from epilepsy since childhood. He is violent in his character and is feared by all in the village. Kalidasu is his classmate who has had a special bond with Kitappa since childhood. Kali always accompanies Kittappa and carries iron keys to assist him in case of an epilepsy seizure. Both Kali and Kitappa grow up to be unsuccessful in their respective lives, and Kali is criticised for this by his father, who is a well-known classical singer but has himself not been financially successful. Kali has had a liking for music, but discourages him from music and persuades him into a professional degree course. Kittappa, meanwhile, had frequent epileptic seizures and is a nuisance in both his home and the village, despite seeking various medical treatments.

Unknown to his father, Kalidasu has a natural talent as a singer and has abundant raw talent, which he displays at the local temple. Jyothi who is a student of Kali's father and falls for Kali after she hears him singing. Kali, though initially reluctant towards Jyothi, soon develops a passionate relationship with her based on the mutual interest in music. Kitappa discloses to Kali that he is the only person who loves him, and they reaffirm their brotherly love for each other. Meanwhile, local expert advises that the only treatment for Kitappa is to get married. Sathyavathi amma plans to get as a wife for Kitappa. Kitappa agrees to this, unbeknownst about the affair between Kali and Jyothi and persuades Kali to forget Jyothi and leave the village for Kitappa's sake. Kitappa is devastated after coming to know about everything after their marriage and commits suicide.

Years later, an ageing Sathyavathi calls for Kali, who has grown up to be a well-known singer in India, to pay a visit to her. Kali's visit to the village and subsequent happenings form the rest of the story. Meanwhile, Jyothi is paralysed and unable to speak probably from the shock of her forced marriage and then the subsequent suicide of her husband Kitappa. When Kalidasu sings "Raga Sudha Rasa.." for Jyothi, then hearing his voice, Jyothi attempts to sing along. Soon, she displays signs of getting cured, and now, Sathyavathi passes on, relieved that Jyothi can be reunited with Kali.

== Cast ==
- Vineeth as Kalidasu
- Manoj K. Jayan as Kitappa
- Rambha as Jyothi
- J. V. Somayajulu as Sathyavati, Kalidasu's father
- P. J. Sarma
- Tanikella Bharani

== Soundtrack ==
The soundtrack was composed by Bombay Ravi, for which the lyrics were penned by Veturi. The songs were well received.

- Swara Raga Ganga Pravahame - K. J. Yesudas
- Godavari - S. P. Balasubrahmanyam, K. S. Chithra
- Raagasudha - K. J. Yesudas
- Sarigama - K. S. Chithra
- Sangeethame - S. P. Balasubrahmanyam
- Krishna Krupa - K. J. Yesudas, Chithra

== Release ==
The film failed at box-office. Producer C. Aswini Dutt knew it would happen due to the film's experimental nature and the fact that the actors are from the Malayalam film industry and are unfamiliar with Telugu speaking audience.
