= Sarigam =

- city
- Location in Gujarat, India Sarigam (India)
- Coordinates: 20.27801°N 72.84171°E
- Country: India
- State: Gujarat
- District: Valsad

Population (2001)
  - Total: 472

Languages
  - Official: Gujarati, Hindi
- Time zone: UTC+5:30 (IST)
- Vehicle registration: GJ
- Website: gujaratindia.com

Sarigam is a town and an Industrial Notified Area in Umargam (Umbergaon) taluka of Valsad district in the Indian state of Gujarat.

== Demographics ==
As of 2001 India census, Sarigam INA had a population of 100,000. Males constitute 63% of the population and females 37%. Sarigam INA has an average literacy rate of 70%, higher than the national average of 59.5%: male literacy is 70%, and female literacy is 42%. In Sarigam INA, 18% of the population is under 6 years of age.
