= Sargam notes =

Hindustani sight-singing technique

Sargam (from SA-RE-GA-MA), a technique for the teaching of sight-singing, is the Hindustani or North Indian equivalent to the western solfege. Sargam is practiced against a drone and the emphasis is not on the scale but on the intervals, thus it may be considered just intonation. The same notes are also used in South Indian Carnatic music.

The notes, or swar, are Shadj, Rishabh, Gandhara, Madhyam, Pancham, Dhaivat, Nishad. When singing these become Sa, Re, Ga, Ma, Pa, Dha, Ni, and sargam stands for "Sa-Re-Ga-Ma". Only these syllables are sung, and further designations are never vocalized. When writing these become, S, C, D, E, F, G, A dot above a letter indicates the octave higher, a dot below the octave lower. A line below a letter indicates it is flat or komal, an acute accent above a letter indicates it is sharp or tivar. In some notation systems, the distinction is made with capital and lowercase letters. Natural is called shudda. Re, Ga, Dha, and Ni may be either shudda or komal; Ma may be either shudda or tivar and is then called tivra Ma. Sa and Pa are immovable (once Sa is selected), forming a just perfect fifth.

In certain forms of Indian classical and qawwali, when a rapid, 16th note sequence of the same note is to be sung, sometimes different syllables are used in a certain sequence to make the whole easier to pronounce. For example instead of "sa sa sa sa sa" said really quickly, it might be "sadadalisadadali" which lends itself more to a quick and light tongue movement.

Also see Carnatic music, swara.
