= Kaithapram Viswanathan Namboothiri =

Indian musician and music director (1963–2021)

- Born: 1963; Kaithapram, Payyanur, Kerala, India
- Died: 29 December 2021 (aged 58); Vellalasery, Kozhikode, Kerala, India
- Occupations: Composer; Musician
- Years active: 1996–2021
- Spouse: Gouri
- Children: Adithi, Narmada, Keshav
- Parent(s): Keshavan Namboothiri, Adithi Antharjanam
- Relatives: Kaithapram Damodaran Namboothiri (brother)
- Awards: Kerala State Film Award for Best Background Music

Kaithapram Vishwanathan Namboothiri (1963 – 29 December 2021) was an Indian musician and music director. He was awarded Kerala State Film Award for Best Background Music in 2001 for his background music for Kannaki.

== Life and career ==
Viswanathan was born in Kaithapram village in Payyanur Taluk of Kannur district in 1963 to Kannadi Kesavan Namboothiri (a Carnatic musician and a disciple of Chembai Vaidyanatha Bhagavathar) and Adithi Antharjanam as their youngest child. His eldest brother, Kaithapram Damodaran Namboothiri, is a lyricist and a poet.

An alumnus of Thiruvananthapuram Music College, Nambudiri handled the orchestra for his brother's songs in Jayaraj's Desadanam. He made his debut with Kaliyattam, directed by Jayaraj. He composed music for some 23 films, many of which were directed by Jayaraj including Kannaki and Thilakkam. Most of his songs were written by his own brother, but many other lyricists like Gireesh Puthenchery, Sachidanandan Puzhankara and S. Ramesan Nair also wrote his songs. His scores had been rendered by K. J. Yesudas, P. Jayachandran, K. S. Chithra and G. Venugopal.

Viswanathan died of cancer at the MVR Cancer Center in Vellalasery near Kozhikode on 29 December 2021, at the age of 58. He was cremated with full state honours at Thiruvannur Kovilakam crematorium near his home. He is survived by his wife Gouri, daughters Adithi and Narmada, son Keshav, brothers Damodaran and Vasudevan and sister Thankam. Both his parents and another sister, Saraswathi, predeceased him.
