= Indra (2008 film) =

2008 film by H Vasu

- Movie poster
- Directed by: H Vasu
- Written by: B. A. Madhu (Dialogues)
- Screenplay by: H. Vasu
- Story by: Suresh
- Produced by: V Kuppaswamy; B Suresh
- Starring: Darshan; Namitha
- Cinematography: Krishna Kumar
- Edited by: M. Verman
- Music by: V. Harikrishna
- Production company: Super Good Combines
- Distributed by: Jayanna Films
- Release date: 25 May 2008
- Running time: 140 minutes
- Country: India
- Language: Kannada

Indra is a 2008 Indian Kannada-language masala film starring Darshan and Namitha in the lead roles. It is a remake of 2003 Tamil film Arasu.

Indra was released on 25 May 2008 and became an average grosser at the box office.

== Premise ==
Indra's dreams of living a normal life gets shattered when his brother Rayanna and sister-in-law gets killed by a Mumbai-based crime boss. With this, Indra sets on a crusade to exact vengeance for Rayanna's death.

== Cast ==
- Darshan as Rayanna and Indra
- Namitha as Janaki
- Sanghavi
- Ramesh Bhat
- Anandaraj
- Harish Raj
- Avinash
- Siddarth
- Vinaya Prasad
- Thimme Gowda as Ramashastry
- Anitharani
- Sathyajith
- Bullet Prakash
- Kalpana
- Sadashiva Brahmavar
- Ganesh Rao
- Mandeep Roy
- Lochan

== Soundtrack ==
The music was composed by V. Harikrishna and released by Ashwini Recording Company.

Indra

Soundtrack album by V. Harikrishna
- Released: June 18, 2008
- Recorded: 2008
- Genre: Soundtrack
- Length: 22:08
- Label: Ashwini Recording Company
- Producer: V. Harikrishna

V. Harikrishna chronology
Gaalipata (2008)	Indra (2008)	Arjun (2008)

Track list
No.	Title	Lyrics	Singer(s)	Length
1.	"Daari Bidi"	V. Nagendra Prasad	Shankar Mahadevan	4:08
2.	"Raja Ninnane"	V. Nagendra Prasad	Kunal Ganjawala, Anuradha Sriram	4:47
3.	"Ye Galasi"	Kaviraj	Suchitra	4:22
4.	"Gum Gum"	V. Nagendra Prasad	Udit Narayan, Malathy Lakshman, Tippu	4:58
5.	"Rainbow"	Kaviraj	Chaitra H. G.	3:53
Total length:				22:08

== Reception ==
A critic from Rediff.com wrote that "The fast-paced story does not effectively translate into a brisk narration". A critic from Sify wrote that "This is a usual run-of-the-mill Darshan film that has nothing much to boast except his double role for the first time".
