= Vavval Pasanga =

- Theatrical release poster
- Directed by: Suresh
- Written by: Suresh
- Produced by: A. K. R.
- Starring: Rahul; Utthara Unni
- Cinematography: Y. N. Murali
- Edited by: Gopi Krishna
- Music by: Jerome Pushparaj
- Production company: Sree Raji Movies
- Release date: 26 October 2012
- Country: India
- Language: Tamil

Vavval Pasanga is a 2012 Indian Tamil-language romantic crime film written and directed by Suresh. The film stars Rahul and Utthara Unni in the lead roles.

== Plot ==
A youngster is compelled to choose an unfavorable path because of societal pressure and turns into a cold-blooded gangster. However, his life starts to change when he falls in love.

== Cast ==
- Rahul as Kasiraman a.k.a. Vavval
- Utthara Unni as Kasi's love interest
- Raja as Kasi's father
- Rama
- Muruganandam
- Ramesh
- Saadhika
- Paranthaman
- Kaaka
- Jayan
- Vijayaraj
- Rajeswari
- Neelakandan
- Jyothi
- Mahendran
- Bhagat Singh
- Manoharan

== Production ==
This film marks the film debut of Utthara Unni, daughter of Malayalam actress Urmila Unni.

== Soundtrack ==
The music is composed by Jerome Pushparaj, who previously composed for Thodakkam (2008). The film's music was praised by Kamal Haasan.

All lyrics are written by Kabilan Vairamuthu.

Songs
No.	Title	Playback	Length
1.	"Aanantha Thandavam"	José Ernesto Monzón	1:20
2.	"Earuna Earuvenda"	Naveen	4:37
3.	"Kanne En Kannil"	Karthik	4:44
4.	"Poo Methu Vazhum"	Suchitra	1:08
5.	"Vaa Machi"	Suchitra	4:30
6.	"Vannanda Vannanda"	Rahul Nambiar	4:34

== Reception ==
A critic from The Times of India rated the film 2 out of 5 and said that "Vavwal Pasanga has emotions, romance, comedy and action but the problem is that there is no common thread connecting them". Malini Mannath of The New Indian Express called the screenplay "insipid" and "meandering".
