= Madhushree Narayan =

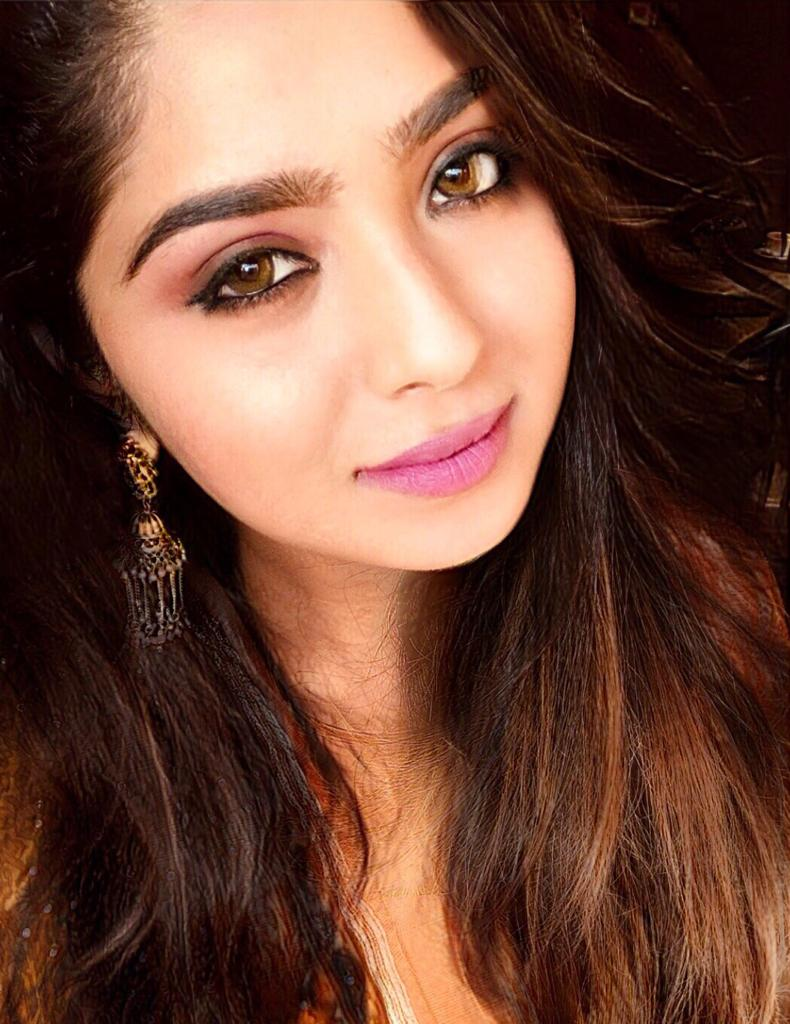
- Madhushree in 2015
- Born: 9 February 1999 (age 27); Thiruvananthapuram, Kerala, India
- Occupation: Playback singer
- Years active: 2003 – present
- Musical career
- Genres: Classical; Thumri; Ghazal; Bhajan; Filmi; Pop
- Instrument: Vocals
- Website: www.madhushreenarayan.com

Madhushree Narayan is an Indian playback singer and a classical singer. She was born to the Classical singer and music composer, Ramesh Narayan and Karnatic music artist Hema. She has won Kerala State Film Awards for Best Female Playback Singer in 2015 and 2019 and received Kerala Film Critics Award 2014.

== Career ==
Madhushree has been singing from the age of three and began learning music formally from her father Ramesh Narayan and later from Jasraj.

== Awards and honours ==
Year	Award category	Work
2015	Kerala State Film Award for Best Playback Singer - Female	Edavappathy
2019	Kerala State Film Award for Best Playback Singer - Female	Kolaambi
