= Nam Naadu =

Nam Naadu may refer to:

- Nam Naadu (1969 film), a Tamil-language film starring M. G. Ramachandran
- Nam Naadu (2007 film), a Tamil-language film starring R. Sarathkumar
