= Lenin Rajendran =

Indian filmmaker and politician (1951–2019)

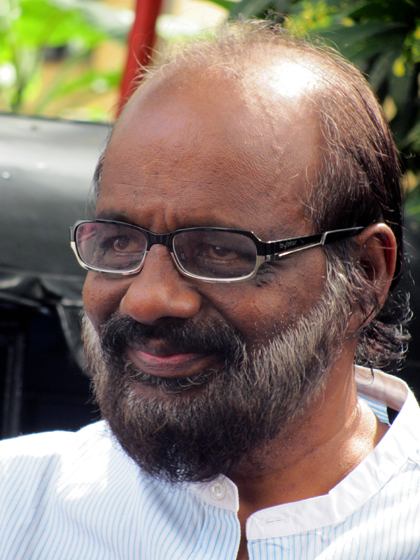
- Born: 1951; Thiruvananthapuram, Kerala, India
- Died: 14 January 2019 (aged 67); Chennai, Tamil Nadu, India
- Other name: Rajendran
- Occupations: Film director; Screenwriter
- Years active: 1981–2019
- Children: 2

Lenin Rajendran (1951 – 14 January 2019) was an Indian film director and screenwriter who worked in Malayalam cinema. He served as the Chairman of Kerala State Film Development Corporation from 2016 to January 2019.

== Career ==
Beginning his film-making career as an assistant to director P. A. Backer, Rajendran made his directorial debut with Venal (1982). Although Rajendran mainly worked in independent and serious cinema, his films retained elements of mainstream film production. His works, the last of which was the film Edavappathy (2016), are distinguished by the absence of traditional happy endings.

An active member of the Communist party, Rajendran at times integrated his political orientation into his screen work: his 1985 film Meenamasithile Sooryan was about the anti-feudal upheaval of the 1940s in Kerala from a Communist viewpoint. As a CPI(M) nominee, he contested against Shri K. R. Narayanan in Ottapalam in both the 1989 and 1991 Lok Sabha elections.

Swathi Thirunal (1987), a period film was a biographical work of a 19th-century king of Travancore, better known as a musical composer. While Daivathinte Vikrithikal (1992) was the cinematic adaptation of M. Mukundan's novel of the same name, Kulam (1997) was a loose adaptation of C. V. Raman Pillai's historical novel Marthandavarma, Mazha (2001) was adapted from Madhavikutty's Nashtapetta Neelambhari. One of his other films, Anyar (2003) deals with the hot topic of communal polarisation in Kerala.

His other films are Prem Nazirine Kanmanilla (1983), Puravrutham (1988), and Vachanam (1989).

Не was the chairman of Kerala State Film Development Corporation.

== Death ==
Lenin Rajendran died on 14 January 2019 in Apollo Hospital Chennai after a liver transplant, at the age of 67. His body was taken back to his native place, and was cremated with full state honours. He is survived by his wife Dr. Ramani, son Gouthaman and daughter Parvathi.

== Awards ==
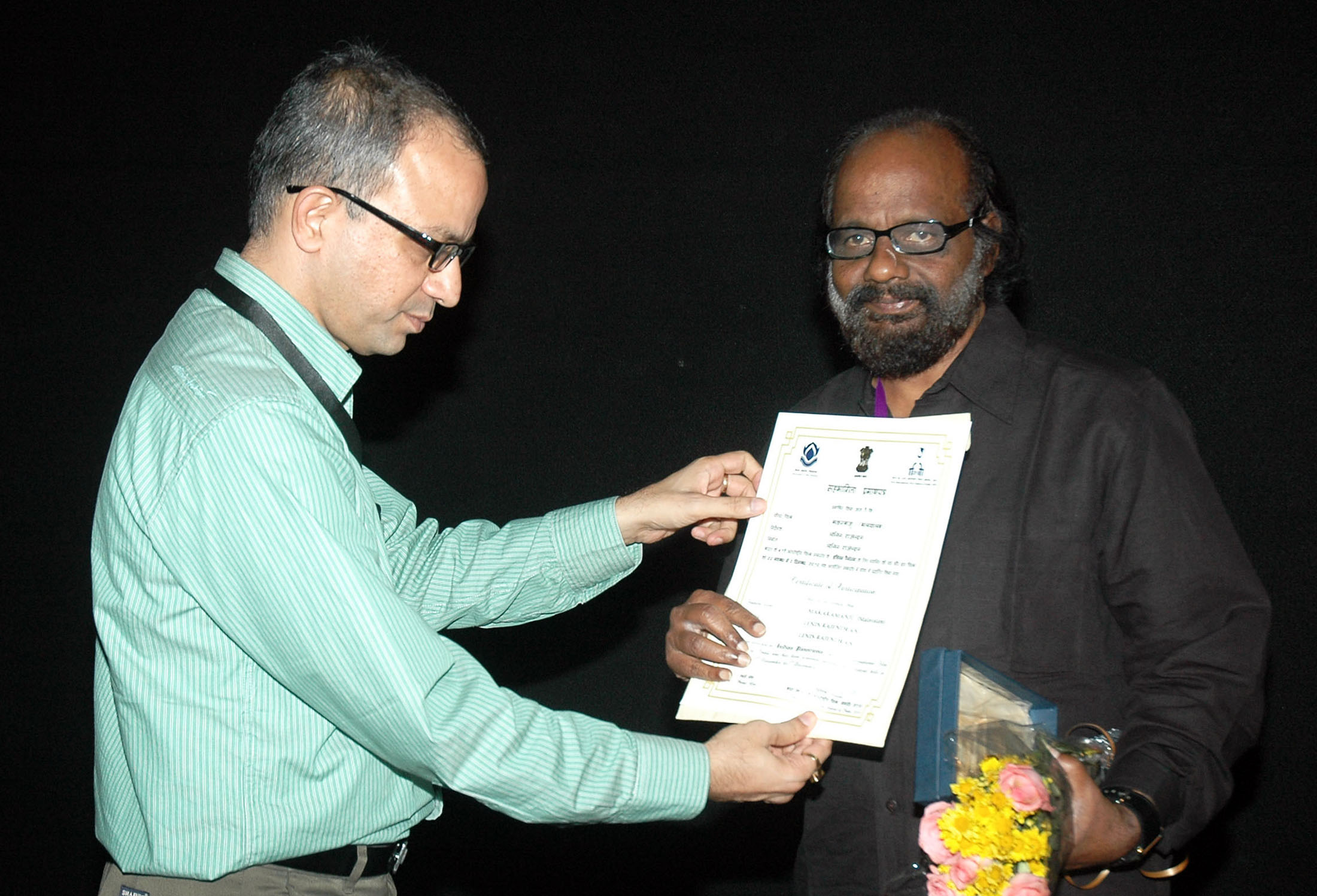
Lenin Rajendran (right), being felicitated at IFFI (2010)

Kerala State Film Awards

- 1987 - Kerala State Film Award (Special Jury Award): Swathi Thirunal (film)
- 1992 - Kerala State Film Award for Best Film: Daivathinte Vikrithikal
- 1996 - Best Film with Popular Appeal and Aesthetic Value : Kulam
- 2006 - Kerala State Film Award for Best Director : Rathri Mazha
- 2010 - Kerala State Film Award for Second Best Film:Makaramanju

International Film Festival of Kerala

- 2010 - FIPRESCI Prize for Best Malayalam Film - Makaramanju

Kerala State Television Awards

- 1999 - Second Best Teleserial: Balyakalasmaranakal
- 2011 - Best Documentary (Biography): Kaviyoor Revamma

Kerala Film Critics Award

- 2003 - Special Jury Award : Anyar
- 2006 - Second Best Film : Rathri Mazha
- 2010 - Second Best Film : Makaramanju
- 2016 - Best Screenplay : Edavappathy

== Filmography ==
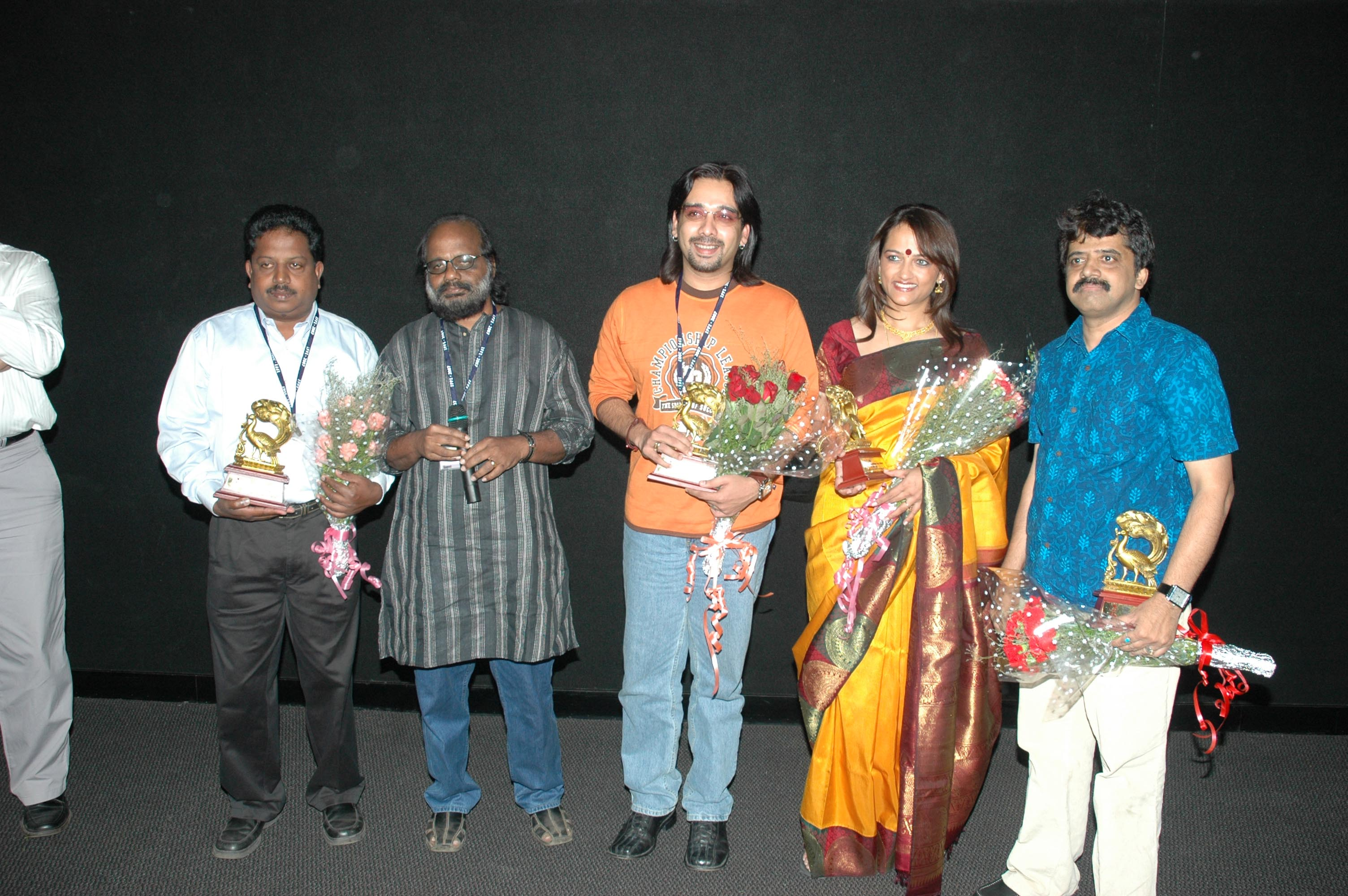
Director Lenin Rajendran with the cast of the film at Indian Panorama, during presentation on 24.11.2007 at Panji Goa

Year	Title	Cast
1981	Venal	Sukumaran, Jalaja
1982	Chillu	Venu Nagavalli, Shanthi Krishna
1983	Prem Nazirine Kanmanilla	Prem Nazir, Sreenivasan, Maniyanpilla Raju, Vijay Menon
1985	Meenamasathile Sooryan	Bharath Gopi, Venu Nagavalli, Vijay Menon, Murali, Ravi, Shobana
1985	Mazhakkala Megham	
1987	Swathi Thirunal	Anant Nag, Ranjini
1988	Puravrutham	Om Puri
1989	Vachanam	Suresh Gopi, Jayaram, Sithara, Sreevidya, Thilakan, Mamukkoya
1992	Daivathinte Vikrithikal	Raghuvaran, Srividya, Thilakan, Vineeth, Sudheesh, Siddique
1997	Kulam	Suresh Gopi, Bhanupriya, Vijayaraghavan
2000	Mazha	Biju Menon, Lal, Samyuktha Varma, Jagathy Sreekumar, Thilakan, Urmila Unni
2003	Anyar	Jyothirmayi, Biju Menon, Lal, Siddique
2007	Rathri Mazha	Vineeth, Meera Jasmine, Manoj K. Jayan, Biju Menon, Lalu Alex, Cochin Haneefa
2010	Makaramanju	Santosh Sivan, Karthika Nair, Nithya Menon, Lakshmi Sarma
2016	Edavappathy	Utthara Unni, Manisha Koirala, Siddhartha
2017	Crossroad Segment - Pinpe Nadappaval	Anjana Chandran, Joy Mathew, Sagar
