= Siddharth Lama =

Nepalese actor

Siddarth Lama (Nepali: सिद्धार्थ लामा) (born 1985; Pokhara, Nepal) is a Nepali film actor. Outside Nepal he is best known for his memorable role as the Rimpoche in the Malayalam film Yoddha (1992). He has since played the lead role in Lenin Rajendran's Malayalam film Edavappathy (2016).

== Personal life ==
Siddharth is the son of the Nepali film maker and actor Yubraj Lama. He is a graduate in management and works with the Nepal National Sports Council. He is a recovered drug addict, a Trained Drug Counselor and General Secretary of D-Care Foundation, a NGO that works with drug users in Nepal. He has authored a book Drug and Drug Addiction.

== Film career ==
Siddharth, then a six-year-old, shot to fame and immense popularity in Kerala for his role as the young Rimpoche in the hit Malayalam movie Yoddha. He plays the lead role in Lenin Rajendran's Edavappathy alongside Manisha Koirala and Utthara Unni. Siddharth has also starred as a child artiste in several Nepali films and played the lead in one feature film, Gandharva, and in a couple of short films.
