= Suryakantha =

- Suryakantha
- Directed by: M. Surendran
- Written by: M. Surendran
- Screenplay by: M. Surendran
- Story by: M. Surendran
- Produced by: Sanju S Unnithan
- Starring: Rajesh Hebbar, Simi Baiju, Omsha, Balaji Sarma
- Cinematography: Dinesh Baboo
- Edited by: Jayachandra Krishna
- Music by: Ramesh Narayan
- Production company: Spire Productions
- Release date: 26 April 2017
- Country: India
- Language: Sanskrit

Suryakantha is a Sanskrit film made in Kerala, India. It is the fifth Sanskrit film overall and the first contemporary Sanskrit film, which narrates the story of an ageing couple living out their last days. It talks about common people who converse in Sanskrit. The film won 'Special Jury award' at the 2017 Kerala Film Critics Association Awards.

== Plot ==
Suryakantha tells the story of an ageing couple living out their last days. The couple, both Kathakali artists, live a dreary life and their only comfort is the lovely memories of a glorious past where they had amazed the audiences with outstanding performances. Janaki (Simi Baiju), who was a dancer in her prime, is now bed-ridden and Narayanan, (Rajesh Hebbar) her husband, who was once a famous Kathakali singer, is making a living as a carpenter. His only aim in life is to keep his ailing wife comfortable and happy.
