= Edavappathy =

- Film poster
- Directed by: Lenin Rajendran
- Screenplay by: Lenin Rajendran
- Produced by: N. R. K. Pillai; Ravisankar
- Starring: Manisha Koirala; Siddharth Lama; Utthara Unni
- Cinematography: Madhu Ambat
- Edited by: B. Lenin
- Music by: Ramesh Narayan; Mohan Sitara
- Production companies: Green Cinema; Manoram Creations
- Distributed by: Padhuva Films
- Release date: 29 April 2016 (India)
- Running time: 115 minutes
- Country: India
- Language: Malayalam

Edavappathy (lit. 'Southwest monsoon') is a 2016 Indian Malayalam-language drama film written and directed by Lenin Rajendran. It deals with the story of the mental conflicts of a Tibetan Buddhist priest. Siddharth Lama plays the male lead with Utthara Unni opposite him. Manisha Koirala also plays a leading role.

Art director was Suresh Kollam. Mohan Sitara and Ramesh Narayan composed the music. The film won three Kerala State Film Awards.

== Cast ==
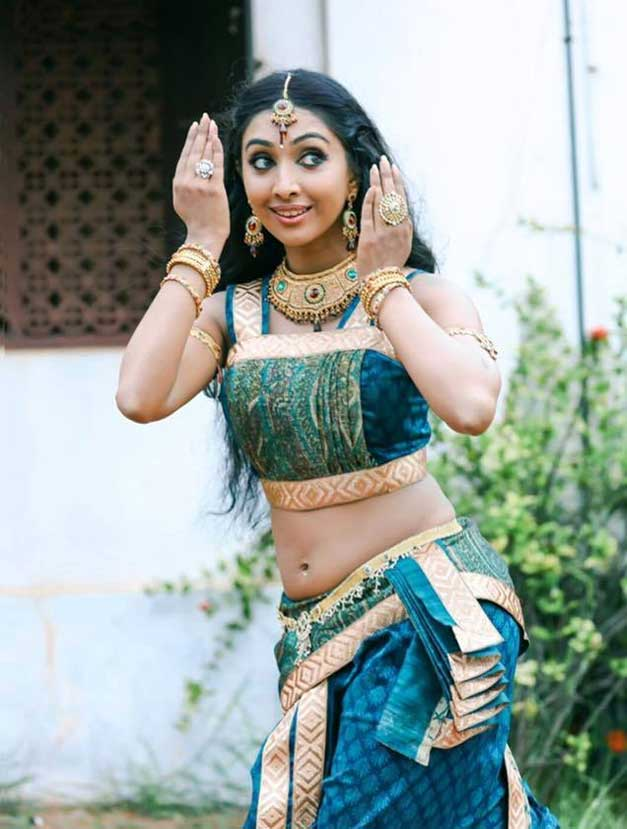
Utthara Unni as Vasavadatta, the main female lead

- Siddharth Lama as Siddharath / Upagupta (Voice dubbed by Sharath Das)
- Manisha Koirala as Sumithra / Mathangi (Voice dubbed by Praveena and Bhagyalakshmi)
- Utthara Unni as Vasavadatta / Yamini (Voice dubbed by Angel Shijoy)
- Kelly Dorji

== Awards ==
46th Kerala State Film Awards

- Best Music Director : Ramesh Narayan
- Best Singer : Madhushree Narayan
- Best Dubbing Artist : Sharath Das

Kerala Film Critics Awards

- Best Screenplay : Lenin Rajendran
- Best Female Debut - Utthara Unni
- Best Makeup Artist -
