= Suresh (director) =

Indian film director

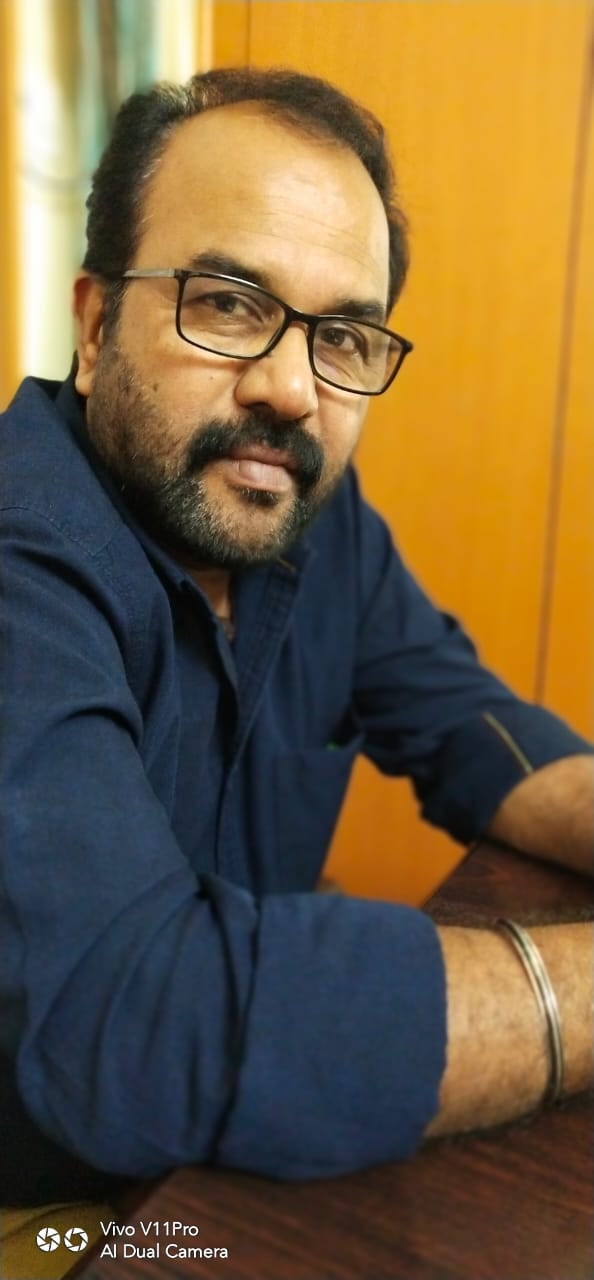
- Image of director Suresh, taken from a smartphone
- Occupations: Director, screenwriter
- Years active: 2003–present

Suresh is an Indian film director and screenwriter, who directs Tamil-language action-masala films.

== Career ==
Suresh studied under various directors including Dharani, N. Maharajan and N. Lingusamy. He made his directorial debut with Arasu starring R. Sarathkumar and Simran. Most of the shooting took place at Kumbakonam, in and around the temple areas. Other locations were Mumbai and Kolkata. A fight scene was filmed at the Kumbakonam market area. Five cameras were used and it took ten days to shoot the fight scene. The scene choreographed by Peter Hein and filmed by cinematographer Y. N. Murali, was shot amidst a large crowd including the hero, some stuntmen, character artistes and the locals. Close-up shots of the fight scene were shot again in Chennai Studio where a set resembling the market place was erected. Sify wrote:"the narration is told in a gripping fashion with all the essential ‘masalas’ like punchy dialogues, action, song ‘n’ dance and item numbers".

After the film's success Suresh again collaborated with Sarathkumar in Gambeeram, which received mixed reviews and had an average performance at the box office. In 2006, Suresh announced his next film titled Kattan with Prashanth. However, the film never took off despite an official announcement.

Suresh made a comeback with Sabari with Vijayakanth appearing as a doctor, The film received mixed reviews and failed at box office.

He again directed Sarathkumar in Nam Naadu, remake of Malayalam film Lion. The film based on politics was released at the time when Sarathkumar started a political party. The film received negative reviews and became a failure. After a five-year gap, Suresh directed Vavval Pasanga with newcomers Rahul (son of choreographer Lalita Mani) and Utthara Unni (daughter of Malayalam actress Urmila Unni) starring. The film's low key release meant that film went unnoticed at the box office. During 2017, he worked on a family drama film titled Thirupathisamy Kudumbam featuring newcomers.

== Filmography ==
| Year | Title | Ref. |
|---|---|---|
| 2003 | Arasu | |
| 2004 | Gambeeram | |
| 2007 | Sabari | |
| 2007 | Nam Naadu | |
| 2012 | Vavval Pasanga | |
| 2018 | Thirupathisamy Kudumbam | |
