= Kolaambi =

2019 Indian Malayalam-language drama film

- Official poster
- Directed by: T. K. Rajeev Kumar
- Written by: T. K. Rajeev Kumar, KM Venugoplal
- Produced by: Roopesh Omana
- Starring: Nithya Menen; Renji Panicker; Rohini; Dileesh Pothan; Sijoy Varghese; G Suresh Kumar
- Cinematography: Ravi Varman
- Edited by: Ajay Kuliyoor
- Music by: Ramesh Narayan
- Production company: Nirmalyam Cinema
- Release dates: October 2019 (Goa); 7 April 2023
- Running time: 124 minutes
- Country: India
- Language: Malayalam

Kolaambi (transl. Loudspeaker) is a 2019 Indian Malayalam-language drama film written and directed by T. K. Rajeev Kumar, starring Nithya Menen, Renji Panicker, Rohini, Sijoy Varghese and Dileesh Pothan. The film is produced by Roopesh Omana under the production house Nirmalyam Cinema. Resul Pookutty handles the sound recording, while music is composed by Ramesh Narayan and cinematography is done by Ravi Varman. Production design is done by Sabu Cyril.

Kolaambi was premiered in Indian Panorama at 50th International Film Festival of India, Goa, held in November 2019. The film was released on 7 April 2023.

== Cast ==
- Nithya Menen as Arundhati
- Renji Panicker as Abdul Khader
- Dileesh Pothan as Sudharshan
- Sijoy Varghese as Sanjay Tharakan
- Rohini as Sundarambal
- Siddharth Menon as Solomon
- Baiju Santhosh as Moulavi
- Aristo Suresh as Aampli Naanu
- Suresh Kumar as Varghese
- Manju Pillai as Lawyer
- Asha Aravind as Anju Sudharshan
- P. Balachandran as Kamal Pasha
- Pauly Valsan as Alphonse
- Jayakrishnan as Jacob George
- Poojapura Radhakrishan as Beeran
- Vijay Yesudas as himself (cameo appearance)
- Abhiram.S.S as Bicycle Guy(cameo appearance)

== Production ==
Kolaambi marks the 25th film and directorial come back of director T. K Rajeev Kumar after nearly six years. Resul Pookutty was brought in for sound recording. Ravi Varman was signed as the cinematographer and Sabu Cyril as the production designer. Nithya Menen was chosen for the role of biennale artist, marking her second collaboration with T. K. Rajeev Kumar after Thalsamayam Oru Penkutty.

Principal photography of the film was commenced at Thiruvananthapuram on 18 October 2018.

== Soundtrack ==
Kolaambi

Soundtrack album by Ramesh Narayan
- Released: 5 August 2019
- Recorded: 2018–19
- Studios: Muzik Lounge, Chennai
- Genre: Feature film soundtrack
- Language: Malayalam
- Label: Manorama Music

Ramesh Narayan chronology
Ennu Ninte Moideen (2015)	Kolaambi (2019)

Track list
No.	Title	Lyrics	Singer(s)	Length
1.	"Aarodum Parayuka"	Prabha Varma	Madhushree Narayan	3:46
2.	"Ororo Novin"	Prabha Varma	Bombay Jayashri	4:45
3.	"Parayatharike Vanna Pranayame"	Vinayak Sasikumar	Madhushree Narayan	3:58

== Accolades ==
Award	Category	Winner	Notes	Ref.
National Film Awards	Best Lyricist	Prabha Varma	For the song "Aarodum Parayathe Vayya"	
50th Kerala State Film Awards	Best Female Playback Singer	Madhushree Narayan	For the song "Parayathrike Vanna Pranayame"	
