= Sabari (2007 film) =

- VCD cover
- Directed by: Suresh
- Written by: Suresh; Pattukottai Prabhakar (dialogues)
- Produced by: Salem Chandrasekharan
- Starring: Vijayakanth; Jyorthirmayi; Malavika
- Cinematography: Y. N. Murali
- Edited by: G. Sasikumar
- Music by: Mani Sharma
- Production company: Sree Saravana Creations
- Release date: 17 March 2007
- Running time: 167 minutes
- Country: India
- Language: Tamil

Sabari is a 2007 Indian Tamil-language action film directed by Suresh. It stars Vijayakanth as the title character with Jyothirmayi, Malavika and Pradeep Rawat in supporting roles. The film was released on 17 March 2007 to mixed reviews.

== Plot ==
Sabarivasan is a doctor by profession and cannot tolerate injustice by any means. Nandhini, a college student, meets Sabari and falls in love with him. Eventually they both get married. Vajravelu is a local criminal working for a minister. Vajravelu's brother-in-law Ezhumalai is arrested by the police for a brutal murder. While trying to escape on the way to court, he is shot by a policeman. Vajravelu's henchmen take Ezhumalai to Sabari and force him to operate. Sabari removes the bullet, but he beats up all the henchmen and produces Ezhumalai to the police. Ezhumalai is sentenced to death and is hanged.

Vajravelu is angry and vows revenge. Vajravelu comes out on bail and kills Sabari's father. He also kidnaps Nandhini. Sabari fights against Vajravelu and saves Nandhini. On the way back to the hospital, Sabari is stabbed by Vajravelu's wife. Vajravelu and his henchmen arrive and injure Sabari. They leave thinking Sabari is dead, but he is saved and admitted to hospital. Knowing this, Vajravelu comes in search of Sabari. Sabari fights them back and kills Vajravelu.

== Cast ==
- Vijayakanth as Dr. Sabarivasan
- Jyothirmayi as Nandhini
- Malavika as Doctoral student
- Pradeep Rawat as Vajravelu
- Mahadevan as Minister
- Delhi Ganesh as Sabarivasan's father
- Aryan as Ezhumalai
- LIC Narasimhan as Doctor
- Scissor Manohar as Party member
- R. N. R. Manohar as Dr. Manohar
- Aishwarya as Vajravelu's wife
- Rajashree as Maragadham
- Reena as Anjali
- Ayyappan Gopi as Brake inspector
- Robo Chandru as Inspector Vasudevan
- Rajendranath as Commissioner of police
- Sindhu as Vajravelu's sister
- Vatsala Rajagopal as Nandhini's grandmother
- Boys Rajan as Dr. Rajan
- Mudhalvan Mahendran as Police inspector
- Theni Murugan as Arumugam
- Raviprakash as Inspector general of police
- Vishwanth as Sri Lankan Tamil man
- Archana Harish as Sri Lankan Tamil woman

== Production ==
The film was launched at AVM Studios on 29 August 2006. Shooting was done at locations in India including Chennai, Pondicherry and Rameswaram, while a song sequence was filmed in Bangkok.

== Soundtrack ==
Soundtrack was composed by Mani Sharma.

| Song | Singers | Lyrics |
|---|---|---|
| "Aalayamani" | Kalyani Menon | Na. Muthukumar |
| "Aavana Aakkana" | Tippu, Sujatha Mohan | Na. Muthukumar |
| "Om Ennum" | Ranjith, Naveen, Rahul Nambiar | Na. Muthukumar |
| "Orumurai Sonnal" | Naveen, Bhargavi | Na. Muthukumar |
| "Osama Osama" | A. V. Ramanan, Ranjith, Naveen | Kabilan |

== Critical reception ==
The Hindu wrote "Now having said all these you can only add that Vijayakanth could have gone in for an innovative storyline, far removed from the run-of-the-mill rut". Lajjavathi of Kalki praised Vijayakanth for doing an action film without politics and also praised Suresh for racy screenplay and called Pattukottai Prabhakar's dialogues as sharp but felt if Malavika's portions, unnecessary songs were removed and some of the plots were trimmed, this Sabari would have been talked about even more. Chennai Online wrote "Whether it's a lawyer, a cop or a doctor he is playing, it doesn't seem to matter much. For it's the same predictable and cliched scenario that Vijaykanth goes through. Which again doesn't speak very highly of the director's effort to present a fare that is refreshing or exciting". Sify wrote "There is plenty of blood and gore, punch lines, flying kicks and songs in exotic foreign locales. But sadly director Suresh has no story to tell and stretches it for nearly three hours. All said and endured, Sabari, tests your patience".
