= Prem Nazirine Kanmanilla =

1984 Malayalam film by Lenin Rajendran

- Directed by: Lenin Rajendran
- Written by: Lenin Rajendran; Vaikom Chandrashekharan Nair
- Starring: Prem Nazir; Mammootty; Vijay Menon; Maniyanpilla Raju; Sreenivasan
- Cinematography: Venu
- Edited by: G. Murali
- Music by: M. B. Srinivasan
- Production company: Susmitha Creations
- Distributed by: Susmitha Creations
- Release date: 25 November 1983
- Country: India
- Language: Malayalam

Prem Nazirine Kanmanilla (transl. Prem Nazir is missing) is a 1983 Malayalam crime film, directed by Lenin Rajendran, starring Sreenivasan, Maniyanpilla Raju, Vijay Menon and Prem Nazir in the lead roles. The movie also shows the Kerala society and its political leadership and how various people behave during such a tragic event.

The name may have been based on an older movie Postmane Kananilla ("Postman goes missing") in which Prem Nazir played the lead role.

== Plot ==
A group of frustrated youngsters decides to kidnap the famous Malayalam actor Prem Nazir from one of the film shooting sets. The captured Prem Nazir is then taken to a dilapidated home in a dense forest. The kidnappers treat Prem Nazir with due respect and in the best possible manner, given the place where they are. One kidnapper comes from an upper-caste Hindu family, and his father worked as the local temple oracle. Though highly educated, he does not find a good job. Another gang member has a very troubled childhood during which his parents were murdered and he had to live as a domestic helper of the murderer. The kidnap of Prem Nazir is to express their frustration against the cruel society.

Kerala is now totally shocked to hear about this news. Old actresses Ragini and Kumari are seen watching old movies in which Prem Nazir acted with them. New movie releases (including Richard Attenborough's Gandhi) have been suspended and old Prem Nazir movies are now played in the theatres. The producer of the latest movie in which Prem Nazir was acting, is in a very bad state. Only two more scenes in his movie were yet to be shot. In desperation he requests Prem Nazir's brother Prem Nawaz to act as a dummy, so that he can somehow complete the movie. The producer, pleads with Prem Nawaz that the movie would get completed, and he can release the movie and generate some quick money. His idea is to release the movie before Prem Nazir is rescued.

The political scene in the state is in a bad condition. The ruling government of the day is accused of being lax on investigations. The party in the opposition feels that government did not provide adequate protection to Prem Nazir because, Nazir sympathised with the party in opposition. Demands are made asking the Home Minister to resign. The Home Minister flatly refuses and tries to retain his position. He feels there are international agencies out there involved in the kidnapping and so assistance from the central government is required.

Meanwhile, the state police also mobilizes large numbers of police officers from the armed reserve and armed police battalions for a combing operation. At the same time, Prem Nazir, who by then had become quite friendly with the kidnappers, manages to convince them of the foolishness of their actions. He advises them to surrender. They soon plan to escape from the forest with a plan to surrender when they are ambushed by a police party. The police whose only aim was to rescue Prem Nazir uses excessive force to capture the kidnappers. They are beaten all the way to the police vehicles and one of them is shot. A dejected Prem Nazir looks on helplessly as he knows that the kidnappers are not hardcore criminals, but he cannot convince the police and also the government leadership and the people.

== Cast ==
- Sreenivasan as Kidnapper
- Maniyanpilla Raju as Kidnapper
- Vijay Menon as Kidnapper
- Gangadharan Menon as Kidnapper
- Thilakan as Home Minister
- Innocent as Himself
- Prem Nazir as Himself
- Krishnankutty Nair as Producer Mamachan
- Swapna as Herself
- Nedumudi Venu as Himself
- Madhavi as Herself
- Shanthi Krishna as Herself
- Aranmula Ponnamma as Herself
- Menaka as Herself
- Mammootty as Himself
- Shankar as Himself
- Achankunju as Maran
- Santhakumari as Bhargavi
- Bharath Gopi (uncredited cameo)
- Lakshmi (uncredited Cameo)
- Sheela (Uncredited Cameo)
- Prema (Uncredited Cameo)
- Reena
- Kanakalatha
- Vijayan
- Aruna
- Hari
- Innocent acts as a film producer. In real life, in the 1970s and early 1980s, Innocent was a film producer.
- Director P. G. Viswambharan, actors Mammootty, Nedumudi Venu and Prem Nawas act as themselves in the movie.
- John Samuel, who was quite popular anchor for the programme Prathikaranam in Doordarshan Malayalam in early 1990s acted as the Deputy Superintendent of Police investigating this case.

== Similar Incident ==
In a real-life parallel, Kannada film actor Dr. Rajkumar was abducted by poacher and bandit Veerappan on July 30, 2000, and was released after 108 days.
