= Yoddha (1992 film) =

1992 film by Sangeeth Sivan

- Directed by: Sangeeth Sivan
- Written by: Sangeeth Sivan (Story)
- Screenplay by: Sasidharan Arattuvazhi
- Produced by: Saga Films
- Starring: Mohanlal; Jagathy Sreekumar; Siddharth Lama; Puneet Issar; Madhoo; Urvashi
- Cinematography: Santosh Sivan
- Edited by: A. Sreekar Prasad
- Music by: A. R. Rahman
- Production company: Saga Films
- Distributed by: Saga Films
- Release date: 3 September 1992 (India)
- Running time: 150 minutes
- Country: India
- Language: Malayalam

Yoddha: The Warrior, or simply Yoddha (transl. Warrior) is a 1992 Indian Malayalam-language action-adventure film directed by Sangeeth Sivan and written by Sasidharan Arattuvazhi. Mohanlal plays the lead role of Thaiparambil Ashokan, the saviour destined to rescue the Rimpoche of a Nepalese Buddhist monastery from sorcerers practicing black magic. The ensemble supporting cast include Siddharth Lama, Jagathy Sreekumar, Puneet Issar, Madhoo and Urvashi.

The original songs and background score were composed by A. R. Rahman. Santosh Sivan was the cinematographer and A. Sreekar Prasad edited the film. Saga Films produced and distributed the film. Yoddha was released in India on 3 September 1992. It was later dubbed and released in other regional Indian languages—Dharam Yoddha (1997) in Hindi, Ashokan (1993) in Tamil, and Yoddha (1993) in Telugu. The film won four Kerala State Film Awards for Best Child Artist (Lama), Best Editor (Prasad), Best Sound Recordist (Arun K. Bose), and Best Male Singer (M. G. Sreekumar).

== Plot ==
In an unknown location on the Himalayan Nepal, a mystical boy is about to be crowned the Rimpoche of a Buddhist monastery when a gang of sorcerers, led by Vishaka, abduct the child. Vishaka is in service to a mysterious enchantress, who needs to make a human sacrifice of the Rimpoche before the solar eclipse to attain invincibility. The monks expect the advent of a saviour, the man with ears as a weapon, across the Himalayas to rescue the child as they are prophesied. In the meantime, Rimpoche manages to escape through the course and reaches Kathmandu.

At the other end of the subcontinent, in a village in Kerala, Ashokan, a youngster spends his time competing with his cousin, Appukuttan, in local games and other shenanigans. Appukuttan is also having doubts that his fiancé Dhamayanthi prefers Ashokan over him. After a palm reader predicts that he will commit murder if he stays in Kerala, Ashokan is sent to his uncle Capt. Kuttikrishna Menon a.k.a Kuttimama in Nepal by his mother. Unbeknownst to Ashokan, Appukuttan flees to Nepal beforehand and masquerades as Ashokan before their uncle. Once Ashokan reaches Nepal, in unforeseen circumstances loses his luggage and while he reaches his uncle's home he is cast out assuming he is a con artist as Appukuttan disguises as Ashokan is already there. In the streets, he meets the boy and forms a bond with him and names him Unnikuttan.

Kuttimama's daughter, Aswathi, is a researcher in Nepalese traditions and history. As a payback to Ashokan, Appukuttan attempts to plot his way into marrying her, who in turn is Ashokan's bride-to-be by their custom, but not engaged. Ashokan, with Unnikuttan's (as he calls the boy) assistance, manages to cast doubt into the mind of his uncle about the credibility of Appukuttan's claims and wins over Aswathi's love and trust.

Ashokan and Aswathi witness one of the sorcerers' confederate combatants kidnapping the boy. Upon following him into a forest, they end up confronting Vishaka. In an ensuing fight, Vishaka grievously wounds Aswathi, blinds Ashokan using a substance, and leaves the two to die. Ashokan is rescued by a tribe affiliated with the monks that train warriors tasked with protecting the monastery. Ashokan is discovered as the "chosen one" and is given training in Kung Fu and martial arts, to overcome his blindness and enhance his hearing skills. At the same time, Appukuttan was also captured by another evil tribe while following the two.

Ashokan, now enlisted as a warrior, infiltrates the sorcerer's location and rescues Unnikuttan from a bewitched sheathe. The boy then, aided by an ailing old monk, restores Ashokan's eyesight. As the solar eclipse nears, the monks begin the coronation ceremony of the boy. Vishaka rushes to the monastery to terminate it. But Ashokan stands in his way and, in a climactic fight, kills him. The boy is crowned as the Rimpoche. Ashokan discovers that Aswathi was indeed saved by tribes and is alive and healthy. Appukuttan returns as Ashokan-esque trained warrior, but before he could stand a chance, he is subdued by Ashokan in a friendly manner.

== Cast ==
- Mohanlal as Thaipparambil Ashokan Menon / Akkosotto (called by Unnikuttan)
- Siddharth Lama as Rimpoche / Unnikuttan
- Puneet Issar as Vishaka
- Jagathy Sreekumar as Arassumoottil Appukuttan
- Madhoo as Aswathi Menon
- Urvashi as Dhamayanthi
- M. S. Thripunithura as Capt. Kuttikrishnan Menon (Kuttimama)
- Oduvil Unnikrishnan as Gopalan Menon, Appukuttan's Father
- Jagannatha Varma as Raghavan Menon, Ashokan's father
- Sukumari as Sumathi, Ashokan's mother
- Meena as Vasumathi, Appukuttan's mother
- Gopal Bhutani as Ashokan's trainer
- Yubaraj Lama as Sorcerer's confederate combatant
- Monali Singh as sorcerer
- Subair as Mohan, Ashokan's motivator
- Beena Antony as Baba, Ashokan's sister
- Nandu as Santhosh, Ashokan's friend
- Vineeth Anil as Vikru, Ashokan's hometown buddy
- Priyanka as a girl in kabaddi crowd
- Kalabhavan Haneef as a man in song / Appukuttan's Friend

== Production ==
Siddharth Lama debuted in the film playing Rimpoche. His father Yubaraj Lama also acted in the film as the long-haired henchman, an abductor sent by Puneet Issar's villain character. Cinematographer Santhosh Sivan found Siddharth Lama accidentally, who happened to see him when he visited actor Yubaraj Lama. At the time, they were searching for a suitable child actor to play the role of Rimpoche. Sivan invited "little" Lama to the film, who without hesitation said, yes. While filming, Lama shaved his head at least 20 times for the film. Every three days he had to shave.

Ashokan's arrival scene at the Nepal airport was shot at the Tribhuvan International Airport in Kathmandu. The house shown in the film as the residence of Kuttymama in Nepal was originally a hotel named Astoria (it was since then converted into a school). The Swayambhu architecture situated atop a hill in the Kathmandu Valley was a significant filming location. Some of the comedy scenes between Mohanlal and Jagathy Sreekumar were shot on its steps elevating to the Buddha statue. The jacket worn by Mohanlal in the scenes shot in Nepal was an indigenous fashion at the time, called the Butterfly Jacket. Some sequences were filmed inside a cave called the Bat Cave in Pokhara, a tourist attraction. Baring a few scenes shot in Palakkad, the film was completely shot in Nepal.

== Music ==
Yoddha

Soundtrack album by A. R. Rahman
- Released: 2 August 1992
- Recorded: 1992
- Venues: Madras (now Chennai), Tamil Nadu
- Studio: Panchathan Record Inn
- Genre: Feature film soundtrack
- Label: Tharangini Records
- Producer: A. R. Rahman

A. R. Rahman chronology
Roja (1992)	Yoddha (1992)	Pudhiya Mugam (1992)

The film's original songs and background score were composed by A. R. Rahman; the lyrics for the songs were by Bichu Thirumala. Yoddha was the second film of Rahman after Roja (1992). He was working on Roja when he signed Yoddha. Rahman had already attained fame across South India for composing successful jingles for advertisement films and was then known by the name Dileep. Sangeeth decided to experiment with Rahman as the composer and was impressed with Rahman's musical arrangement for a candy commercial he directed. He also liked Rahman's composition of "Chinna Chinna Asai" for Roja, which Rahman showed him while he was in his studio.

The song "Padakaali" is featured in the backdrop of a singing competition between Ashokan and Appukuttan in a temple, with both of them dissing each other with words. The song's situation in the story was briefed to lyricist Thirumala by Sivan while they were in Rahman's Panchathan Record Inn studio in Chennai. After hearing it, Hindu goddess Kali's image was the first thing that came into his mind. He thought that a hymn describing Kali's furious persona would suit the situation. He referred to the book Mahakshetrangalude Munnil by Nalankal Krishna Pillai for reference, from which he got words such as padakali, porkali, chandi, maargini among others, to use in the lyrics. Padakali and chandi are synonyms for goddess Kali. Since it was a comical song, it was not expected to have deep words, though Thirumala was particular that the words should not be meaningless, and most of the words he added were related to religious worship. It is one of the all-time popular songs in Malayalam film music.

Apart from the original Malayalam version, the soundtrack was also released in Tamil (as Asokan), Hindi (as Dharam Yoddha), and Telugu (as Yoddha). The respective soundtracks featured versions of all songs except "Mamboove" which was not featured in the film. "Mamboove" was later reused for the Tamil movie Pavithra as "Sevvanam". The lyrics were written by Vairamuthu, P. K. Mishra, and Veturi respectively for the Tamil, Hindi, and Telugu versions. The Hindi version was added with five songs composed by Pappu Khan, none of which was featured in the film. The original soundtrack was released by Tharangini in 1992. The Tamil dubbed version, Asokan by Pyramid was released in 1994, the Hindi version by BMG Crescendo in 1996, and the Telugu version in 1995. The Hindi version was re-released in 1997 with five new songs added.

=== Track listing ===
All lyrics are written by Bichu Thirumala.

Yoddha (Original Motion Picture Soundtrack)
No.	Title	Artist(s)	Length
1.	"Maampoove"	K. J. Yesudas, Sujatha Mohan	03:33
2.	"Padakaali"	K. J. Yesudas, M. G. Sreekumar	04:23
3.	"Theme"	Malgudi Subha, A. R. Rahman	05:20
4.	"Kunu Kune"	K. J. Yesudas, Sujatha Mohan	03:50

All lyrics are written by Vairamuthu.

Ashokan (Tamil dubbed)
No.	Title	Artist(s)	Length
1.	"Kulu Kulu Endru"	S. P. Balasubrahmanyam, K. S. Chithra	03:50
2.	"Om Kari"	S. P. Balasubrahmanyam	04:23
3.	"Nilavuku Pakkam"	S. P. Balasubrahmanyam	06:51

Dharam Yoddha (Hindi dubbed)
No.	Title	Lyrics	Music	Artist(s)	Length
1.	"Me Delhi Ka Sahjada"	P. K. Mishra, Shyam Anuragi	A. R. Rahman	S. P. Balasubrahmanyam	04:23
2.	"Muzko Lagta Hai"	P. K. Mishra, Shyam Anuragi	A. R. Rahman	S. P. Balasubrahmanyam, K. S. Chithra	03:50
3.	"Chori Se Chupke" (Re-added)	P. K. Mishra, Shyam Anuragi	Pappu Khan	Jolly Mukherjee, Poornima Shrestha	05:47
4.	"Ek Do Teen Char" (Re-added)	P. K. Mishra	Pappu Khan	Jolly Mukherjee, Alka Yagnik	06:08
5.	"Kal Raat Muzse Tu" (Re-added)	P. K. Mishra	Pappu Khan	Abhijeet Bhattacharya, Poornima Shrestha	04:02
6.	"Kangana Kalai Mein" (Re-added)	P. K. Mishra	Pappu Khan	Kavita Krishnamurthy	05:06
7.	"Ye Resham Ki Saari" (Re-added)	P. K. Mishra	Pappu Khan	Kumar Sanu	05:56

Yoddha (Telugu dubbed)
No.	Title	Artist(s)	Length
1.	"Kulu Kule"	S. P. Balasubrahmanyam, S. P. Sailaja	03:50
2.	"Theme"	Malgudi Subha	05:20

== Release ==
Yoddha was released in India on 3 September 1992.It started with huge initial and was hit at box office despite mixed reviews.It was later dubbed and released in other regional Indian languages—Dharam Yodha (1997) in Hindi, Ashokan (1993) in Tamil, and Yoddha (1993) in Telugu. Tamil, Telugu dubbing rights of yodha was sold for 29 lacs and dubbed versions became huge success.

== Accolades ==
Award	Category	Recipient	Result	Ref.
Kerala State Film Award	Best Child Artist	Siddharth Lama	Won	
Kerala State Film Award	Best Editor	A. Sreekar Prasad	Won	
Kerala State Film Award	Best Sound Recordist	Arun K. Bose	Won	
Kerala State Film Award	Best Male Singer	M. G. Sreekumar	Won	
