= Puravrutham =

- Directed by: Lenin Rajendran
- Written by: C. V. Balakrishnan
- Screenplay by: Lenin Rajendran; C. V. Balakrishnan
- Produced by: M. K. Aniyan
- Starring: Revathy; Om Puri; Innocent; KPAC Lalitha
- Cinematography: Ramachandra Babu
- Edited by: V. R. K. Prasad
- Music by: Kavalam Narayana Panicker
- Production company: Chithrakarthika
- Distributed by: Chithrakarthika
- Release date: 11 February 1988
- Country: India
- Language: Malayalam

Puravrutham is a 1988 Indian Malayalam film, directed by Lenin Rajendran and produced by M. K. Aniyan. The film stars Revathy, Om Puri, Innocent and KPAC Lalitha in the lead roles. The film has musical score by Kavalam Narayana Panicker.

== Cast ==
- Revathy as Devu
- Om Puri as Raman
- Innocent as Kelu Vair
- KPAC Lalitha as Kanaran's Wife
- Murali as Achu
- Abu Salim
- Babu Namboothiri as Masur
- Balan K. Nair as Kanaran
- Jagannathan as Toddy Shop Keeper
- M. S. Thripunithura as Landlord
- R. K. Nair
- Thodupuzha Vasanthi
- Sujatha Thiruvananthapuram as Pathu
- Vijayaraghavan as Abu
- Sreedharan mash as Police Man

== Soundtrack ==
The music was composed by Kavalam Narayana Panicker.

No.	Song	Singers	Lyrics	Length (m:ss)
1	"Aayiram Pidikkunna"	Kavalam Sreekumar	Kavalam Narayana Panicker	
2	"Manjakkaattil"	Jagannadhan	Kavalam Narayana Panicker	
3	"Onnaanaam Malamukalil"	Arundhathi	D. Vinayachandran	
