= Rathri Mazha =

- Directed by: Lenin Rajendran
- Written by: Lenin Rajendran
- Produced by: B. Rakesh
- Starring: Vineeth; Meera Jasmine; Manoj K. Jayan; Chithra Iyer; Lalu Alex; Prem Prakash; Bhanupriya
- Edited by: Mahesh Narayanan
- Music by: Ramesh Narayan
- Distributed by: Green Cinema
- Release date: 16 February 2007
- Country: India
- Language: Malayalam

Rathri Mazha (transl. Night rain) is a 2007 Indian Malayalam-language film by Lenin Rajendran starring Vineeth and Meera Jasmine in lead roles. Rathri Mazha was chosen as one of the Indian entries for the Asian, African and Latin American Competition segment of the 38th IFFI. The film won one National Film Awards and five Kerala State Film Awards.

== Plot ==
Meera loves Hari and with friends she opens her mind one day on this. Meera invited Hari to show her father and keeps arrangements with good dinner but Hari not come. Hari is not seen many days till one day Hari shows his paralysis stage with inability to walk and sitting in a wheel chair. Hari is shown as an efficient dancer and dancing in chitra's dance group with Bala her husband seen fed up with chitra's over dedication to keep repeating the practice. Hari is favourite for chitra who tells him to dance more and shows too much interest in Hari. Bala is in pain seeing chitra showing over interest in Hari. scene shifts to present now Hari weds Meera as Meera confess she loves Hari. Hari later enters chitra's dance class room and chitra gets excited but tells Hari how Hari developed the illness and why Bala disappeared for which Hari remembers he dancing with head down over a high ceiling tied cloth and doing steps and Bala watching after few minutes Hari falls down and gets hospitalized in paralysis condition, Bala confesses he wanted only Hari to fall down and lose the over braveness to make Hari behave himself but didn expect Hari to become paralysed and tells he is leaving as he cannot take up more pain . Now Chithra tells she is going somewhere if by chance she can meet Bala after Bala was not seen many days. Hari comes to know Meera is now sensitive as many people approached her with sexual talk as Hari is paralysed. Hari starts practicing by applying paint on his face and wishes to start his dance troup. Meera dislikes Hari's passion to like the dancing atmosphere and says she is leaving him and goes away. Manoj approach Hari and tells he is with him to proceed with his dancing group and later one female artist who likes Hari after talking hugs Hari but her boyfriend seeing doesn't like and quit the dancing troup. Hari deeply sad starts making dancing steps violently and Manoj seeing this tells Meera to support him by coming there, Meera seen now with Hari who falls into Meera 's lap and Hari recognise Meera is now with him become satisfied and film ends.

== Cast ==
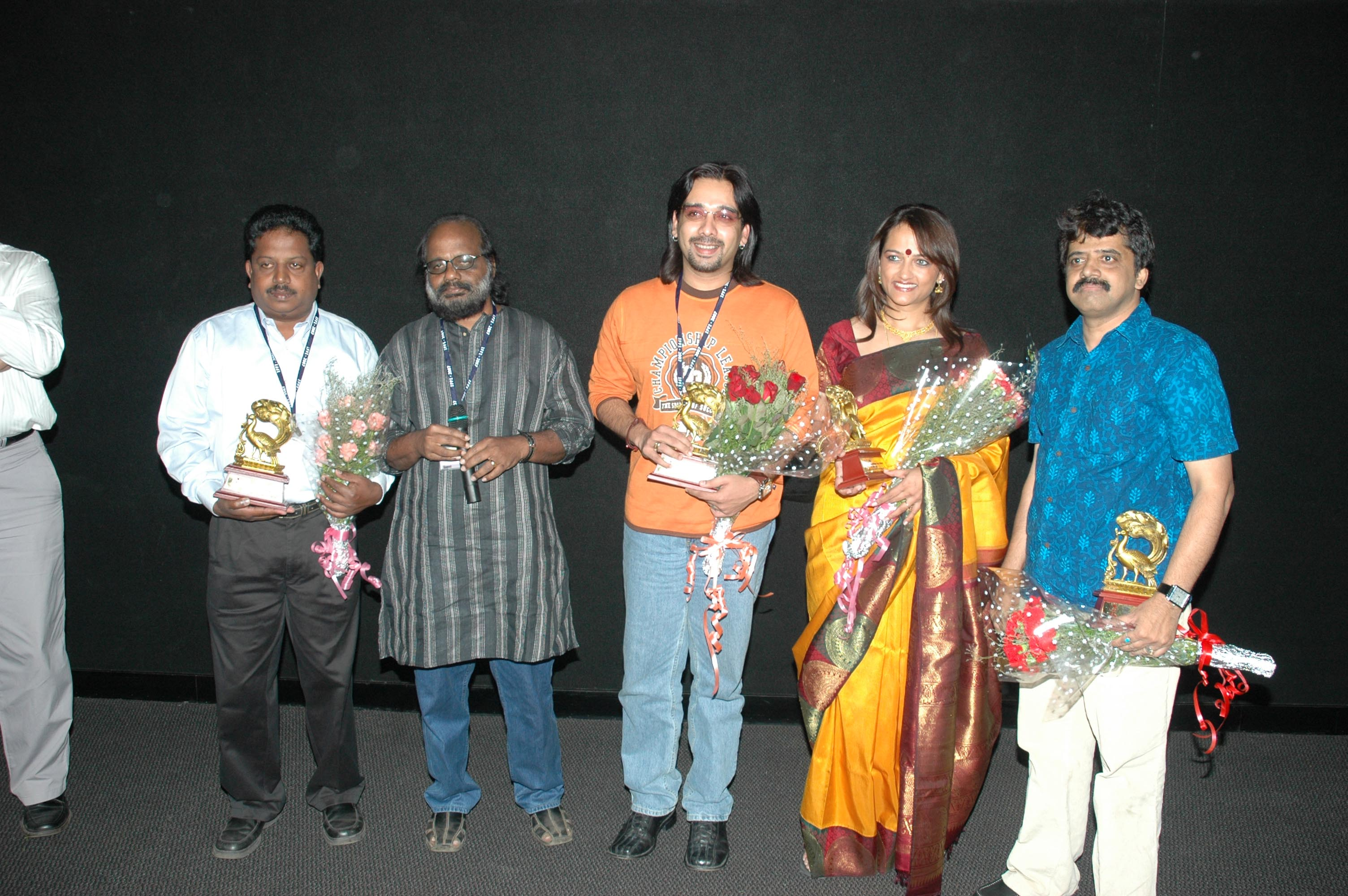
Director Lenin Rajendran with the cast of the film at Indian Panaorama, during presentation on 24.11.2007 at Panji Goa

- Vineeth as Hari
- Meera Jasmine as Meera
- Manoj K. Jayan
- Chitra Iyer
- Diya
- Lalu Alex as Balashankar
- Jagathy Sreekumar
- Sreekala Sasidharan
- Prem Prakash

== Soundtrack ==
The film's soundtrack was composed by Ramesh Narayan, with lyrics penned by Kaithapram, O. N. V. Kurup, and Sugathakumari.

#	Song	Lyricist	Singers
1	Aalolam Kanmani [F]	Kaithapram	Sujatha Mohan
2	Aalolam Kanmani [Humming]	Kaithapram	Sujatha Mohan
3	Aalolam Kanmani [M]	Kaithapram	K. K. Nishad
4	Bhaasuri	Kaithapram	Sujatha Mohan, Srinivas
5	En Nenjile	Kaithapram	Hariharan
6	Manassi Nabhassi (Amrithavarshini)	O. N. V. Kurup	Ramesh Narayan
7	Raathrimazha [FD]	Sugathakumari	K. S. Chithra, Gayathri Ashokan
8	Raathrimazha [MD] (Madhyamavathi)	Sugathakumari	Ramesh Narayan, Gayathri Ashokan

== Awards ==
=== National Film Awards ===
- Best Choreographer - Madu Gopinath, Saji Vakkom

=== Kerala State Film Awards ===
- Best Director - Lenin Rajendran
- Best Music Director - Ramesh Narayan
- Best Male Playback Singer- Srinivas
- Best Female Playback Singer - Sujatha Mohan
- Best Choreography - Madu Gopinath & Saji Vakkom

=== Kerala Film Critics Association Awards ===
- Best Female Playback Singer - Sujatha Mohan
