= Killadi =

2015 Indian film by A. Venkatesh

- Film poster
- Directed by: A. Venkatesh
- Written by: Pattukottai Prabhakar
- Produced by: Salem Chandrasekharan
- Starring: Bharath; Nila; Vivek; Roja
- Cinematography: K. S. Selvaraj; S. Gopinath
- Edited by: V. T. Vijayan; N. Ganesh Kumar
- Music by: Srikanth Deva
- Release date: 30 January 2015
- Country: India
- Language: Tamil

Killadi (transl. Wise Man) is a 2015 Indian Tamil-language action comedy film directed by A. Venkatesh, and produced by Salem Chandrasekharan. It stars Bharath and Nila, while Vivek and Roja play pivotal roles. The music was composed by Srikanth Deva. After beginning production in 2006, the film went through production troubles before releasing on 30 January 2015.

== Cast ==
- Bharath as Dharani
- Nila as Anjali
- Vivek as Arnold
- Roja as Angayarkanni
- Vincent Asokan as Bhavani
- Avinash as SP Easwarapandiyan
- Vennira Aadai Moorthy as Dharmarajan
- Ilavarasu as Inspector Britto
- Delhi Ganesh as Dharani's father
- Cell Murugan as Rambo
- O. A. K. Sundar as Police officer
- Amarasigamani as Anjali's father
- Prem as Dharani's brother
- Bayilvan Ranganathan as Traffic police
- Rajyalakshmi as Dharani's mother
- Vanaja as Easwari, Dharani's sister-in-law
- Revathi Priya as Lakshmi, Dharani's sister
- Sindhu as Servant
- Chelladurai as Head constable
- Kili Ramachandran as Gas company worker
- Thenali as Drunkard
- Japan Kumar as Dharani's friend
- Venkat as Easwarapandiyan's friend
- Supergood Subramani as Chettiar
- Shamili Sukumar as Priya, Anjali's friend
- Archana Harish as Anjali's friend
- Suja Varunee in a special appearance
- Kanal Kannan as Rowdy

== Production ==
The project was first announced in September 2006, when Salem Chandrasekharan announced that he had signed Bharath and director Venkatesh to work together in a film titled Killadi. In a press meet, the producer noted that the film would proceed simultaneously alongside his other production, Vetrimaaran's Desiya Nendunchalai 47 starring Dhanush. Bharath began shooting the film alongside Koodal Nagar and Nepali, delaying his schedules for the other films to maintain his look for Killadi. However, in 2007, the producer ran into financial problems and postponed his two projects indefinitely.

In December 2009, the producer announced that the film would continue its shoot but it was held back by the director's involvement in other films, Maanja Velu, Vaada and Vallakottai, prompting further delays. The film only picked up again in 2013 and was readied for release, with an extended separate comedy track featuring Vivek and Cell Murugan inserted and extensively shot. Further promotions were advertised by the team throughout 2014, before the film was released in January 2015.

== Soundtrack ==
The soundtrack is composed by Srikanth Deva collaborating with director Venkatesh for fourth time, and lyrics written by Vaali. The audio launch of the film took place on 24 March 2013 at Prasad Labs in Chennai. The film's success in overcoming several legal hurdles saw a team of advocates being invited to the event, with the chief guests being producers Kaliaperumal and Gnanavel Raja.

- "Sakkapodu" – Ranjith
- "Ekka Chakka" – Jithin, Vicky
- "Ekka Chakka" (female) – Surmukhi Raman
- "Mamavai" – Rita, Mukesh
- "Nee Rangikkari" – Velmurugan, Mahathi

== Reception ==
The film was released on 30 January 2015. Sudhir Srinivasan of The Hindu wrote, "If there literally existed a sea of clichés, Killadi is what you would get if you randomly drew a bucketful from it". M Suganth from The Times of India noted, "The film is essentially a compendium of the masala movie must-haves — hero introduction song, aggressive hero, his loving family members, damsel-in-distress heroine, kuthu songs disguised as duets, random comedy track and over-the-top villains".
