= Rajesh Hebbar =

Indian actor (born 1967)

- Born: K. Rajesh Hebbar; Palakkad, Kerala, India
- Occupations: Actor; television presenter; singer
- Years active: 2003–present

K. Rajesh Hebbar is an Indian actor Commonly known as Hebb6 who predominantly works in Malayalam films and television.

== Personal life ==
Rajesh Hebbar was born to a Kannadiga family settled in Palakkad, Kerala. He completed his education at Government Victoria College, Palakkad. He is married to Anitha, and they have three children: Akash, Varsha, and Raksha. Hebbar was the lead singer of a rock band named Primitive Knights.

== Filmography ==
=== Television ===
Year (s)	Title	Role	Channel	Director	Notes
2002	Ullurukkam	Moidu	Doordarshan	Shyamaprasad	Telefilm
2004	Orma	Dr. Shyam	Asianet	K. K. Rajeev	
2005	Athira X C		Amrita TV		Telefilm
2006	Unniyarcha	Kannappan Chekavar	Asianet	Shrikuttan	
2006	Lakshyam		Asianet	Dr. S. Janardhanan	
2006–2007	Mandrake		Asianet		
2007	Thadankal Paalayam		Asianet	Swati Bhaskar	
2008	Shri Mahabhagavatham	Shakuni	Asianet	Thulasidas	
2009	Devimahathmyam	Shivamani	Asianet	Viji Thampi	
2010	Rahasyam	Ashok Menon	Asianet	Dr. S Janardhanan	
2010	Kudumbayogam	Luke	Surya TV	K. K. Rajeev	
2010–2011	Autograph	Dr. Syamaprasad	Asianet	Sujith Sunder	
2010	Tik Tik				Won – Kerala State Television Award for Best Actor (Telefilm)
2011–2012	Akashadoothu	Dr. David	Surya TV	Aadithyan	
2011	Nizhalkannadi		Surya TV	Santhivila Dinesh	
2011	Aakashathile Pole Bhoomiyilum	Doctor	Athmeeya Yathra	Athmeeya Yathra	
2011–2012	Allaudinnum Adbudha Villakkum		Asianet	Merryland	
2012–2013	Ammakili	Dr. Koshy	Asianet	Faisal Adimali	Won – Asianet Television Award for Best Actor in a Negative Role
2013	Nirakoottu	Suresh	Kairali TV	Faisal Adimali	
2013	Nirapakittu	Suresh	Media One	Faisal Adimali	
2013	Ethirineram		City channel	Blue magic Palakkad	
2014	Oridathoridathu	Dr. Eapen a.k.a. Achayan	Asianet Plus	Unni Cherian	
2015	Sundari	Sakariya	Mazhavil Manorama	Faisal Adimali	
2016–2019	Bharya	Jose K. Mathew	Asianet	V. K. Gireeshkumar	
2016	Jagratha Season 1	Christopher alias a.k.a. Christy	Amrita TV	Arun	
2016	Sahayathrika	Neelan	Surya TV	K. J. Bose	
2017	Jagratha Season 2	S. I. Kuruvilla	Amrita TV	Kannan	
2017	Jagratha Season 3		Amrita TV	Kannan	
2018	Police	Murugan SI	ACV	Anilkumar	
2018	Makkal	Devan	Mazhavil Manorama	Faisal Adimali	
2019	Mahaguru	Madan Ashan	Kaumudy TV	Dr. Mahesh Kidangil	
2019–2020	Chackoyum Maryyum	Chandrasenan	Mazhavil Manorama	Joyce	
2019	Krithyam	Thomas Roy	Kairali TV	Santosh	
2020	Koodathayi	Panayam Jose	Flowers TV	Girish Konni	
2021–2022	Palunku	Dr. Anirudhan	Asianet	Kiran	
2022	Thumbapoo	The new owner of Corba Gelatin	Mazhavil Manorama	Dileep Thavanur	
2022–2025	Bhavana	Dr. Sreeram	Surya TV	Sunil Karyattukara	
2023–2024	Uppum Mulakum 2	Ram Kumar	Flowers TV	R. Unnikrishnan	
2024	Home	Kishore	Flowers TV	R. Unnikrishnan	
2024–2025	Valsalyam	Girish	Zee Keralam		
2024–2025	Premapooja	Louis	Surya TV		
2026–present	Kattathe Kilikkoodu	Nidhi's father	Asianet		

=== Reality shows ===
Year	Program	Channel	Notes
2010	Tharolsavam	Kairali TV	Participant
2011	Tharolsavam	Kairali TV	Participant
2013	Munch Stars	Asianet	Team Leader – Amma
2014	Sundari Neeyum Sundaran Njanum	Asianet	Participant along with Sonu S. K. Winners
2014	Little Stars	Asianet	Host
2015	Malabar Masala	Flowers TV	Host
2017	Star War	Surya TV	Participant
2018	Urvasi Theatres	Asianet	Participant
2019	Start Music Aaradhyam Padum	Asianet	Participant
2021	Aram+Aram=Kinnaram	Surya TV	Participant

=== Films ===
Year	Film	Role	Notes
2003	Ivar	Alambu Rajan	
2003	Manassinakkare	Joy	
2003	Chitrakoodam		
2005	The Tiger	Doctor	
2006	Karutha Pakshikal	Sathish	
2007	Payum Puli	Rajan Menon	
2007	Smart City	Adv. Joy Philip	
2008	Innathe Chintha Vishayam	Ranjan Phillip	
2010	In Ghost House Inn	Sekhar	
2010	Sahasram		
2011	Sevenes	Max Owner	
2011	City of God	Punnoose	
2011	Oru Nunakatha	Production controller	
2012	Unnam	Vikraman	
2012	Molly Aunty Rocks!	Sunny	
2012	Face2Face	Dr. Chandrabhanu	
2013	White Paper	Psychologist	
2013	Amen	Esthappan / Esthappanasan	
2014	Ulsaha Committee	Kishore	
2014	7th Day		
2014	Pianist	Laila's father	
2014	John Paul Vaathil Thurakkunnu	Dr. Prakash	
2014	1 by Two	Doctor	
2014	Villali Veeran	Mahadevan	
2015	Appavum Veenjum	Rana	
2015	Nirnayakam	Dr. George	
2015	Priyamanasam	Unnayi Warrier	Sanskrit film
2015	KL 10 Patthu	Ahmed's Father	
2015	Haram		
2016	Chennai Koottam		
2016	Akkaldhamayile Pennu	Simon	
2017	Suryakantha	Narayanan	Sanskrit film
2019	Margam Kali	Doctor	
2020	Forensic	Burma Colony victim's father	
2021	Nizhal	Dr. Basheer	
2021	Cold Case	Mahesh	
2022	Kaduva	Dr. Paulachan	
2023	Neru	Thomas	
2026	Mollywood Times	Doctor	
