= Salem Chandrasekharan =

Indian film producer and distributor (died 2021)

- Died: 10 May 2021
- Occupation(s): Film producer, distributor
- Years active: 2004–2015

Salem Chandrasekharan (died 10 May 2021) was an Indian film producer and distributor. He produced high-budget Tamil films like Ghajini and Sabari under Sree Saravana Creations.

== Business ==
Before venturing into film production, Chandrasekharan was a distributor and owner of a three-screen theatre in Salem named ARK Complex. His first production was Sullan (2004) and later was supposed to produce Vetrimaaran's debut film Desiya Nedunchaalai with Dhanush, which was later shelved. Despite the success of Ghajini (2005), his following ventures did not perform well. Owing to financial issues, he also had to pause work on the production of Karu Pazhaniappan's Asokamithran, also starring Dhanush. His final project, Killadi (2015), released almost a decade after the film was shot, owing to financial problems. He later sold his theatres to Aascar Ravichandran.

== Death ==
Chandrasekharan died on 10 May 2021 due to COVID-19.

== Filmography ==
- Sullan (2004)
- February 14 (2005)
- Ghajini (2005)
- Sabari (2007)
- Killadi (2015)
