= Arasu (2003 film) =

- Directed by: Suresh
- Written by: Suresh
- Produced by: R. B. Choudary (presenter); Babu Raaja
- Starring: R. Sarathkumar; Simran; Roja
- Cinematography: Y. N. Murali
- Edited by: V. Jaishankar
- Music by: Mani Sharma
- Production company: JJ Good Films
- Distributed by: Super Good Films
- Release date: 14 April 2003
- Running time: 164 minutes
- Country: India
- Language: Tamil

Arasu (transl. Kingdom) is a 2003 Indian Tamil-language masala film written and directed by Suresh and produced by Babu Raaja. The film stars Sarath Kumar in dual lead roles alongside Simran and Roja, while Sai Kumar, Vadivelu, Delhi Ganesh and Riyaz Khan play supporting roles. The score and soundtrack were composed by Mani Sharma. Arasu was released on 14 April 2003 and became a commercial success at the box office. The film was remade in Kannada as Indra (2008).

== Plot ==
Thirunavukkarasu alias Arasu is employed in a temple by Venu Shastri at Kumbakonam and stays in Pichumani's house. Arasu's calm nature and responsible behaviour impress the local people, and Shastri's daughter Meera falls in love with Arasu. One day, Arasu sees the news about the release of a convict from prison and violently kills the convict with the help of a few men. Meera and Shastri witness the murder. Arasu meets Shastri's family and discloses his past.

Past: Arasu is the son of Periyavar Natarajan, a kind-hearted gangster who is striving hard for the welfare of slum dwellers in Chennai. Sabapathy is a corrupt business tycoon who goes to any extent to earn money. Trouble erupts between Sabapathy and Periyavar, following which Sabapathy is arrested and sentenced to imprisonment for his illegal activities, which led to the deaths of a few young girls. To exact vengeance, Sabapathy's brother Gunashekharan and his henchmen kill Periyavar and his wife Sivagami. Arasu gets enraged and swears vengeance against Sabapathy and Gunashekharan.

Present: Venu Shastri and Meera understand Arasu's position and decide to save him by not disclosing his whereabouts to the police. Despite all the attempts by the cops, Arasu successfully kills Sabapathy and Gunashekharan, then surrenders to the police and is sentenced to imprisonment. Five years later, Arasu finally reunites with Meera and leads a happy life.

== Cast ==
- Sarath Kumar in a dual role as:
  - Thirunavukkarasu (Arasu)
  - Periyavar Natarajan, Arasu's father
- Simran as Meera (Voice dubbed by Savitha Reddy), Arasu's love interest
- Roja as Sivagami, Periyavar's wife and Arasu's mother (Voice dubbed by KR Anuradha)
- Vadivelu as Pichumani
- Sai Kumar as Sabapathy
- Delhi Ganesh as Venu Shastri, Meera's father
- Manivannan as Rahim Bhai, Periyavar's trusted sidekick
- Murali as Harikrishnan, CBI Officer (Voice dubbed by Thalaivasal Vijay)
- Riyaz Khan as Gunashekharan, Sabapathy's brother
- Bhanu Chander as Sundaramurthy
- Sudha as Gomathi, Meera's mother
- Bharathi as Meera's friend
- Minnal Deepa as Thenmozhi
- Kottachi as Photographer
- Chitti Babu as Lawyer
- Sampath Ram as Periyavar's Henchman
- Bava Lakshmanan
- Kiran Rathod in an item number

== Production ==
The film marked the debut of Suresh who had worked with directors like N. Maharajan (Vallarasu), Dharani, and Lingusamy. The film was produced by Baburaja, who previously worked as executive at Super Good Films.

Most of the shooting took place at Kumbakonam, in and around the temple areas. Other locations were Mumbai and Kolkata. A fight scene was picturised at the Kumbakonam market area. Five cameras were used and it took ten days to shoot the fight scene. The scene choreographed by Peter Hayen and canned by cinematographer Y. N. Murali, was shot amidst a large crowd including the hero, some stuntmen, character artistes and the locals. Close-up shots of the fight scene was shot again in Chennai Studio where a set resembling the market place was erected. The film's title was credited in titles as Arasu Darbar with Arasu on top with large letters and Darbar placed below with small letters since the title Arasu was already registered.

== Soundtrack ==
The music was composed by Mani Sharma.

Song	Singers	Lyrics
"Aalaana Dhegam Engum"	Anuradha Sriram	Kabilan
"Bull Bull Thara"	Pop Shalini	Kalaikumar
"Ilesha Kattumaram"	Tippu, Kalpana Raghavendar	Kalaikumar
"Kattha Kattha"	Karthik, Ganga	Kabilan
"Malligai Malligai"	Vijay Yesudas, Sujatha	Kabilan

== Critical reception ==
Sify wrote "the narration is told in a gripping fashion with all the essential ‘masalas’ like punchy dialogues, action, song ‘n’ dance and item numbers". Malini Mannath of Chennai Online wrote, "An 'Arasu' for Sharat, like a Baashha for Rajinikanth, one thought. Till the debutant director, who showed so much promise in the first half, belied it in the second".
