= Nam Naadu (2007 film) =

- Theatrical release poster
- Directed by: Suresh
- Written by: Ramesh Khanna (dialogues)
- Screenplay by: Suresh
- Story by: Udayakrishna; Siby K. Thomas
- Based on: Lion (Malayalam)
- Produced by: Singanamala Ramesh Babu
- Starring: Sarath Kumar; Karthika Mathew
- Cinematography: Y. N. Murali
- Edited by: G. Sasikumar
- Music by: Srikanth Deva
- Production company: Kanagarathna Movies
- Release date: 21 September 2007
- Running time: 161 minutes
- Country: India
- Language: Tamil

Nam Naadu (transl. Our Country) is a 2007 Indian Tamil-language political action film directed by Suresh, starring Sarath Kumar and Karthika Mathew. It is a remake of 2006 Malayalam film Lion. The film, which began production in May 2007, failed to replicate the success of the original.

== Plot ==
Aalavandhar a corrupt politician who holds the post as Education minister and wants to become the chief minister. He is supported by his sons-in-law, Sathya ex-IPS Officer who runs a finance company and Elamaran IAS officer, the district collector. With the idea of his in-laws, Aalavandhar tries to disturb peace in state and make situation against the CM.

Muthazhagu an honest youth wing leader of the same ruling party learns and opposes the move of his father and he stands by and for the people. Sathya, Elamaran and Aalavandhar allocates a land space in a village for a cool drink company. The village is rich in land water and the people oppose for the governments move against them. But these corrupt personalities issue an order for the start of the factory. Muthazhagu tries to meet the collector with the people of the locality and fails to get a reason for it. So he moves on to the court and with the court's order he gets a stay for the project.

In order to save and work for the people he plans to contest in the elections as an independent candidate. He stands opposite his father Aalavandhar. He wins the elections and extends his support to the party and gets a place in the ministry. He takes charge of the high-profile department as Home Minister.

Muthazhagu commands and passes orders to all the departments to work for the welfare of the public and he would take care of all the other issues within the departments. He threatens the CM and takes orders for effective governance.

Aalavandhar gets irritated by the moves of Muthazhagu and discusses the same with his in-laws. Sathya plans to wipe him off. This brings Aalavandhar to realize his misdoings in the past and meets Muthazhagu and confesses his mistake and asks him to return to their home. Muthazhagu accepts to return to their home along with his wife Gowri. On an official call he goes to Delhi. Aalavandhar meets up in an accident and passes away. Muthazagu's mom thinks Muthazagu killed his dad and bans him from the house. Muthazaghu finds that Sathya was the mastermind for the murder as his dad said to him about the public confession of their crimes. Muthazaghu kills his brother-in-law in the climax.

== Cast ==
- Sarath Kumar as Muthazhagu
- Karthika as Gowri
- Nassar as Aaalavandhar
- Ramesh Khanna as Narayanan
- Charan Raj as Sathya
- Ponvannan as Elamaran
- Vijayakumar as Boominathan
- Manivannan as Purushothaman
- Santhana Bharathi as political member
- C. R. Saraswathi as political member
- Nellai Siva as political member
- Pragathi as Muthazhagu's mother
- Abitha as Sathya's wife
- Sriman as Bala
- Riyaz Khan as Krishna Kumar I.P.S
- Madhan Bob as Sena
- Ilavarasu as Albert
- Pandu as political member
- Raj Kapoor as local rowdy
- Besant Ravi as local rowdy
- T. P. Gajendran as Irulandi
- Scissor Manohar

== Soundtrack ==
Soundtrack was composed by Srikanth Deva and lyrics were written by Kabilan.

- "Kadhal Ennum" - Murali Yesudas, Sujatha
- "Kottaisamy Varaaru" - Manikka Vinayagam
- "Manasil Manasil" - Karthik, Chinmayee
- "Vaazhaiyadi" - Jerome Pushparaj

== Critical reception ==
Sify wrote, "Sarath and director Suresh has kept the theme of politics as family business, and added a lot of heroism to the central character and made him a one-man fighting machine". Rediff.com wrote: "Director Suresh needs to realise that unless the scripts are original, it takes a miracle to save a movie. And even in a bankable star like Sarath, he finds no miracle". Madhumitha of Kalki praised the acting of star cast, Ramesh Khanna's dialogues but panned Srikanth Deva's music and cinematography. Chennai Online wrote "The scenes breeze through without leaving much impact. A remake of the Malayalam film, 'Lion', no effort has been made to adapt it to suit a new audience. And whatever little changes have been made, what we get to see are again clichéd scenes and stereotyped characters".
