= Utthara Unni =

Indian actor

- Utthara Unni performing Bharatanatyam at a Dance Festival
- Born: Thiruvalla, Kerala, India
- Occupations: Dancer; actress
- Years active: 2012–2018
- Parent(s): Ankarath Ramanunni; Urmila Unni
- Relatives: Samyuktha Varma
- Website: www.uttharaunni.in

Utthara Unni is an Indian Bharatanatyam dancer from Kerala. She has directed some short films, documentaries and music videos. She also acted in two films. She heads a dance academy called Temple Steps in Kochi, Kerala.

== Career ==
=== As a dancer ===
Utthara Unni Receiving Best Dancer Award 2017.

She has performed in Natyanjali festivals held at Chidambaram, Kumbakonam, Thirunallar, Nagapattinam, Mayiladuthurai, Thiruvarur and Thanjavur. Some of her stages include Soorya Dance Festival – Parampara, Mylapore Fine Arts – Chennai, Sangeetha Nataka Akademi – Thrissur, Nishagandhi – Trivandrum, Eranakulam Shiva temple, Guruvayur, Mookambika temple, Vyloppilli Samskriti Bhavan – Trivandrum. Utthara has also made a name for herself by giving solo concerts in other countries such as Nepal, Thailand, UAE, Abu Dhabi, Sharjah, Bahrain and Kuwait.

She is also the director of the dance school "Temple Steps" situated in Cochin.

She is a member of the UNESCO International Dance Council.

=== Film career ===
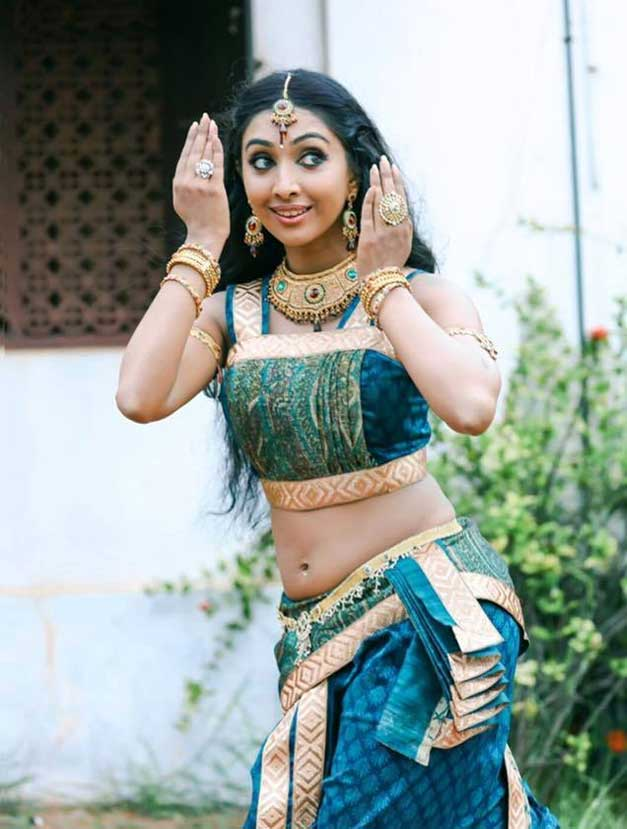
Utthara Unni as Vasavadatta, the main female lead

Utthara's directorial debut was through a short film Randaam Varavu featuring her mother Urmila Unni. The film won her five awards for best direction. She later directed a supernatural short-film featuring Urmila Unni and Devan called Ninth Month. Her next short film Paw Prints featuring Siddique is a short film is about relationship between a man and a dog. She has also created music videos and documentaries. Utthara Unni is also an acclaimed singer and has released a music album titled Pathirapontheril..

She made her debut in the Tamil film Vavval Pasanga (2012) directed by Suresh. Her first Malayalam film was Edavappathy, directed by Lenin Rajendran. Utthara portrayed dual roles of Vasavadatta (a famous character from Kumaran Asan's poem Karuna) and a modern girl Yamini in the parallel story of the film. Her performance was critically acclaimed and won her the Kerala Film Critics Association Award for the best upcoming actor (debut).

Utthara started her TV career in 2015 with a show called Mambazham in Kairali TV. Currently, she is hosting a reality show on Amrita TV called Autumn Leaf to find the best music band in Kerala.

== Personal life ==
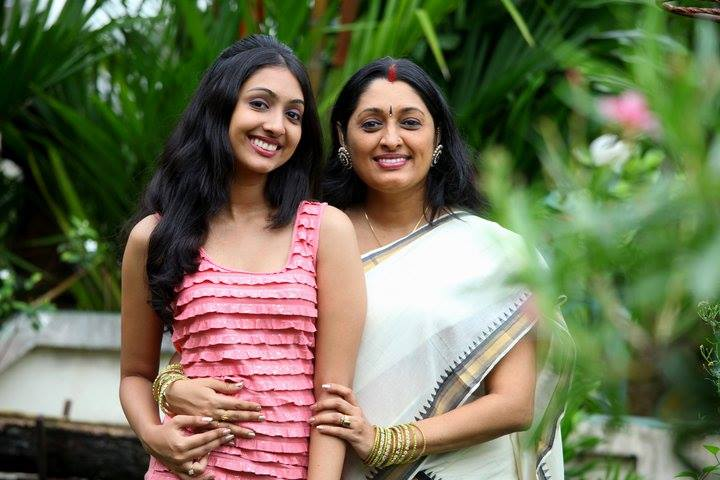
Utthara Unni and her mother, actress Urmila Unni

Utthara Unni is daughter of Malayalam actress Urmila Unni and is married to businessman Nithesh S Nair.Actress Samyuktha Varma is her cousin.

== Awards ==
Utthara Unni Receiving Award

- Drishya award for best direction for the Short Film Randaam Varavu
- Guru Gopikrishna National Award for Bharatanatyam in 2016
- NP Abu Award for The Best Dancer of the Year 2017
- Kerala State Film Critics Award for Best Debut for Edavapathy

== Filmography ==
=== As actress ===
Year	Film	Role	Language	Notes
2012	Vavval Pasanga	kasi's love interest	Tamil	
2016	Edavappathy	Vasavadatta/Yamini	Malayalam	

=== As TV show host ===
Year	Show Name	Role	Channel	Language	Notes
2015	Mambazham	Host	Kairali TV	Malayalam	
2018	Autumn Leaf	Host	Amrita TV	Malayalam	
