= Ramesh Narayan =

Indian singer and composer (born 1959)

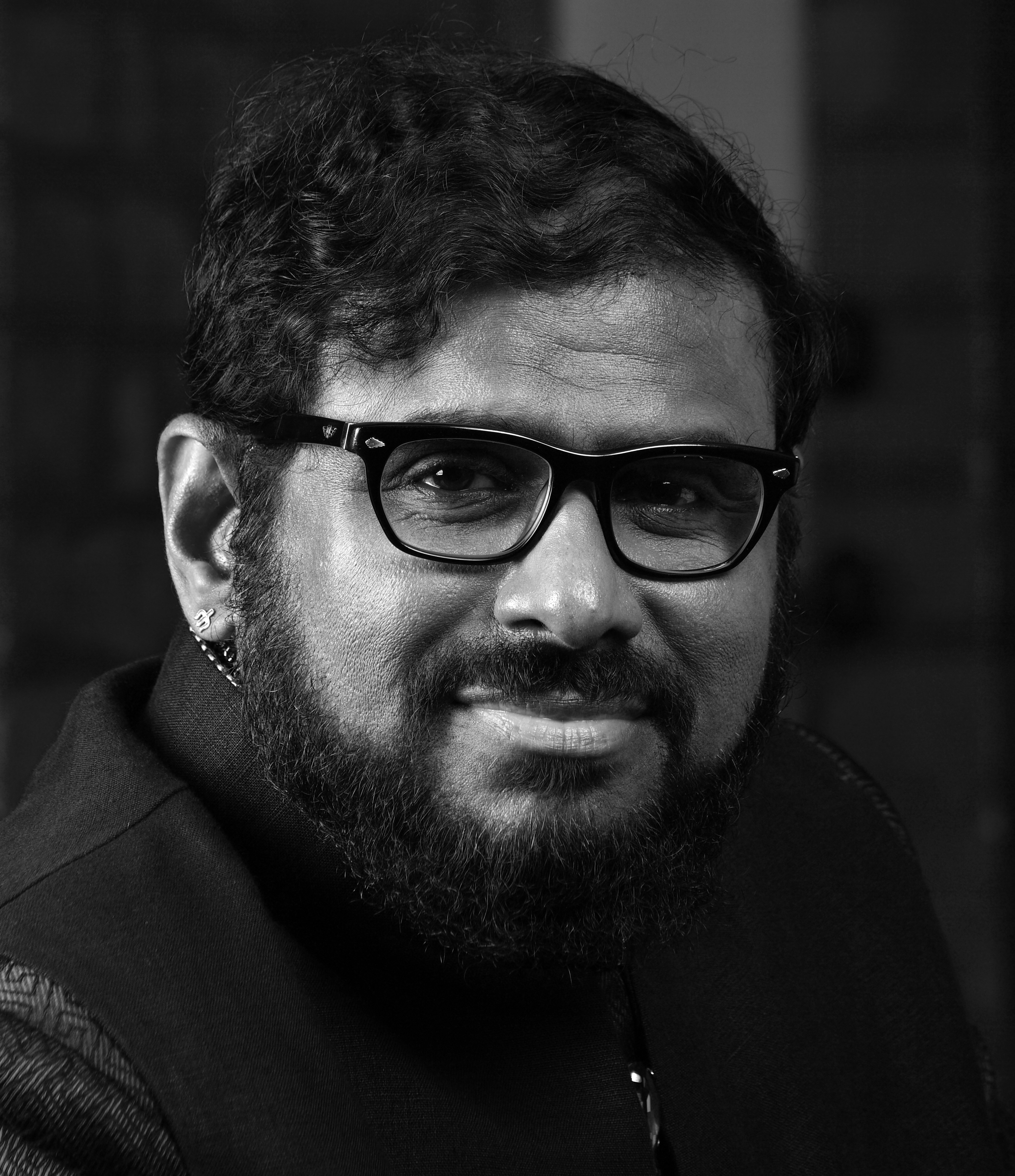
- Ramesh Narayan in 2015

Background information
- Born: 3 November 1959 (age 66); Kuthuparamba, Kerala India
- Occupations: Indian Classical Singer; Music Composer; Music Director; Music Producer
- Years active: 1972–present
- Website: rameshnarayan.com
- Musical career
- Genres: Filmi music; Indian classical; World music
- Instruments: Vocals; Sitar; Guitar; Harmonium
- Labels: PMN Sangeet Gurukul; IME; Arty Entertainments

Ramesh Narayan (born 3 November 1959) is an Indian classical vocalist, composer and music producer who works predominantly in Malayalam cinema. Ramesh began his initial training in Carnatic music and later mastered the classical Hindustani style under the renowned Pandit Jasraj.

Ramesh began his career composing score music for documentaries, films and Indian television programs in Hindi, Malayalam and Tamil. He composed and sung the national integration song Saur Mandal Mein Tim Tim in 1996, directed by Jnanpith Award laureate M.T. Vasudevan Nair for Lok Seva Sanchar Parishad. Ramesh's film-scoring career began in the early 1990s with the Malayalam film Magrib. His notable works include Garshom, Meghamalhar, Saira, Makalkku, Rathri Mazha, Paradesi (2007 film), Manjadikuru Adaminte Makan Abu Veettilekkulla Vazhi, Makaramanju, Edavappathy, Ennu Ninte Moideen, Suryakantha etc.

Ramesh Narayan has earned National Film Awards, four Kerala State Film Awards, two Kerala Film Critics Association Awards. He has received the Indian Music Academy Award for popularizing Hindustani classical music in Kerala from the then President of India Dr. A. P. J. Abdul Kalam.

Ramesh became popular by performing a 36-hour vocal recital as part of celebrating the 100 years of Indian Cinema at the Film and Television Institute of India, Pune. This performance got him an entry to the Limca Book of Records 2013 for completing the 24 hour raga cycle. In 2023, he was honoured with Kerala Sree Award, third highest civilian award given by the Government of Kerala.

== Original scores ==
- All compositions in Malayalam unless otherwise noted

Year	Film	Notes
1993	Magrib	
1999	Garshom	
2000	The Salute	Malayalam-Tamil film
2000	Thottam	
2001	Meghamalhar	
2001	Mookkuthi	
2001	Jeevan Masai	
2003	Anyar	
2003	Saphalam	
2004	Kottaaram Vaidyan	
2005	Makalkku	
2005	Sheelabathi	
2005	Saira	Kerala State Film Award for Best Background Music
2006	Arunam	
2006	Rathri Mazha	Kerala State Film Award for Best Music Director
2007	Paradesi	
2008	Raman	
2008	Manjadikuru	
2009	Orkkuka Vallappozhum	
2009	Katha Parayum Theruvoram	
2010	Thathwamasi	
2010	Avan	
2011	Makaramanju	
2011	Veeraputhran	
2011	Adaminte Makan Abu	
2011	Veettilekkulla Vazhi	Imagine India 2011 Awards for Best Music Director
2013	Miss Lekha Tharoor Kaanunnathu	
2014	Apsaras	Tamil
2014	White Boys	Kerala State Film Award for Best Music Director
2014	Ottamandaaram	
2015	Kukkiliyar	
2015	Alif	
2015	Edavappathy	Kerala State Film Award for Best Music Director
2015	Ennu Ninte Moideen	Kerala State Film Award for Best Music Director
2016	Buddhanum Chaplinum Chirikkunnu	
2017	Aaradi	
2017	Crossroad	
2017	Suryakantha	Sanskrit
2017	Paathi	
2017	Viswasapoorvam Mansoor	
2017	The Sword Of Liberty	
2018	Pacha	
2019	Kolaambi	
2020	Varthamaanam	
2020	Swapnangal Pookkunna Kaadu	
2020	Eelam	
2022	Siddy	

== Awards and achievements ==
Kerala Sangeetha Nataka Akademi Award 2012

Kerala State Film Awards:

- 2005 – Best Background Score - Saira
- 2006 – Best Music Director - Rathri Mazha
- 2014 – Best Music Director - White Boys
- 2015 – Best Music Director - Edavapathy & Ennu Ninte Moideen

== Controversy ==
On 17 July 2024, a video emerged following an incident with actor Asif Ali at the trailer launch of the then upcoming anthology film, Manorathangal. At the event, Asif Ali was supposed to present a memento to Ramesh Narayan, which Ramesh Narayan snubbed.The video of it went viral, leading to widespread criticism and support waves for Asif Ali, and subjecting Ramesh Narayan to cyber trolls. The incident shows Ramesh got his hand to the award from Asif all the while seemingly ignoring the actor. Asif, visibly perplexed by the gesture, remained standing near the musician for a moment before returning to his seat. Ramesh then beckoned filmmaker Jayaraj to make Jayaraj present the memento to him, and demeanour of Ramesh shifted noticeably, smiling and hugging Jayaraj.

On July 18, 2024, Ramesh Narayan issued a public apology regarding the incident, attributing it to unintentional circumstances. Subsequently, on July 19, Asif Ali clarified his stance on the controversy during a press conference. Asif Ali suggested that Narayan's reaction stemmed from personal matters and denied he himself feeling insulted from Narayan's reaction. The actor's public statement also criticised the online harassment directed towards Ramesh Narayan.
