= Urmila Unni =

Indian dancer and actor

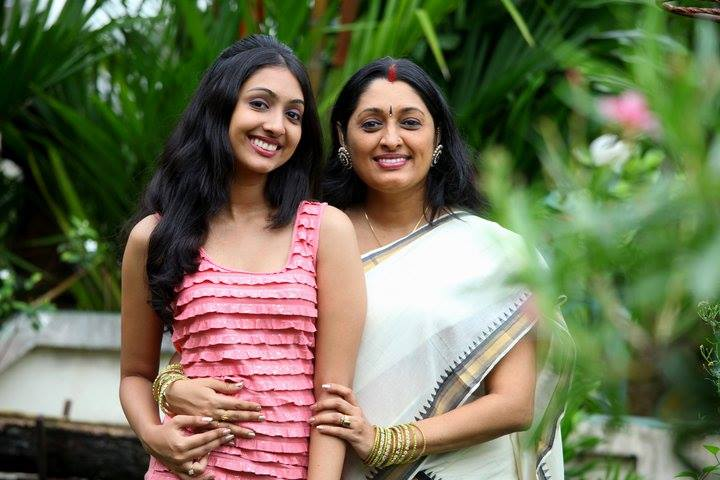
- Urmila (right) with her daughter Utthara Unni (left)
- Born: Swathi Urmila Raja; 14 June 1962 (age 64); Thiruvalla, Kerala, India
- Years active: 1988 – present
- Spouse: Ankarath Ramanunni (m. 1981)
- Children: Utthara Unni
- Parents: K. C. Anujanraja; Manorama
- Relatives: Samyuktha Varma

Urmila Unni (born 14 June 1962) is an Indian classical dancer and actress who predominantly works in Malayalam cinema. Her daughter Utthara Unni is also an actress and professional classical dancer .

== Early life ==
Urmila Unni was born into a royal family as the daughter of K. C. Anujanraja Kottakal Kovilakam and Nedupuram Kottarathil Manorama at Nedumpuram Palace, Thiruvalla. She studied at Infant Jesus Convent School in Thrissur and is a former student of the Sree Kerala Varma College, Thrissur. She learned Bharatanatyam, Kathakali, Mohiniyattam, and Veena. She is also a painter.

Urmila is married to Ankarath Ramanunni. The couple has a daughter, Utthara Unni, who is also an actress and dancer. Currently they are residing at Kadavanthra, Ernakulam. They have started a dance school, Angopanga, in Bahrain. Actress Samyuktha Varma is her niece. She is the author of Cinema Katha and Panchalika.

== Filmography ==
Year	Film	Role	Notes
1988	Maratam	Kavutti	Debut film
1989	Ulsavapittennu	Aniyankuttan's mother	
1992	Sargam	Subhadra Thampuratti	
1992	My Dear Muthachan	Voice for Manu	Tarun
1995	Kathapurushan	Kunjunni's mother	
1997	Irattakuttikalude Achan	Devi	
1998	Panchaloham	Chinnammu	
2000	Puraskaram	Gayathri	
2000	Susanna	Bhargavi	
2000	Mazha	Bhadra's mother	
2000	Ariyaathe		
2000	Kochu Kochu Santhoshangal	Vilasini	
2001	Mookkuthi	Shalini	
2001	Saivar Thirumeni	Martha	
2001	Dosth	Ajith's mother	
2001	Dubai	Swaminathan's wife	
2001	Megasandesam	Mariya	
2002	Dany	Jayalakshmi	
2002	Punarjani	Appu's mother	
2002	Punyam	Queen	
2003	Gaurisankaram	Sankaran's mother	
2004	Sasneham Sumithra	Dr. Nirmala Issac	
2004	Aparichithan	Dr.Thripura Sundari Varma||	
2004	Njan Salperu Ramankutty	Velayudhan's wife	
2004	Thudakkam	Adv. Lakshmi Nair	
2004	Maratha Nadu	Sreelakshmi	
2004	Sethurama Iyer CBI	Meenakshi Iyer	
2004	Aparichithan	Tripura Sundari Varma	
2004	Parayam	Raju's mother	
2005	Pauran	Kathreena	
2005	Sheelabathi	Sumangala	
2005	Bharathchandran I.P.S.	Subhadra	
2006	Raashtram	Maliyekkal Thommi's kin	
2006	Red Salute	Mariya Joseph	
2006	Thuruppu Gulan	Bharathi	
2006	Ammathottil		
2007	Atheetham	Remadevi Thamburatti	
2007	Heartbeats	Edikkula's mother	
2007	Inspector Garud	Sethulakshmi's mother	
2007	Nadiya Kollappetta Rathri	AadiLakshmi Varadhachalam	
2008	Anthiponvettam	Jeevan's mother	
2008	Shakespeare M.A. Malayalam	Rajalakshmi	
2008	Laptop	Dr.Vanaja	
2008	Annan Thampi	Ravunni's wife	
2008	Roudram	Dr. Ratnakumari	
2008	Aayudham	Leena	
2009	Meghatheertham	Radhika	
2009	Duplicate	Maya	
2009	Banaras	Devu's mother	
2009	Pramukhan	Gayathriamma	
2009	Black Dalia	Sunny Kuruvila's wife	
2009	Vairam: Fight for Justice	Sumithra	
2009	Kerala Varma Pazhassi Raja	Chirakkal Thamburatty	
2010	Valiyangadi	Sethulakshmi	
2010	Aatmakatha	Teacher	
2010	Fiddle	Gayatri's mother	
2010	Holidays	Riya's mother	
2010	Pokkiri Raja	Aswathy's mother	
2010	Koottukar	Devaki	
2010	Njaan Sanchaari	Lakshmi	
2010	Kanyakumari Express	Saraswathy	
2011	Daivathinte Kaiyoppu	Sophy's mother	
2011	Dam 999	Vinay's mother	English Movie
2011	7 Aum Arivu	Queen	Tamil Movie
2011	Kanakompathu	Geethu's mother	
2011	Mohabbath	Aarifa	
2011	Snehaveedu	Nalini	
2011	Killadi Raman	Savithri	
2011	Sarkar Colony	Doctor	
2011	Swapnamalika	Appu's mother	
2012	Bhoomiyude Avakashikal	Saradha's mother	
2012	Rasaleela	Savithriyamma	
2012	101 Weddings	Vijayamma	
2012	Theruvu Nakshathrangal	Mahila Sangam President	
2012	Mr. Marumakan	Interview Board Member	
2012	Scene Onnu Nammude Veedu	K.K. Jose's wife	
2012	Arike	Alaga Devi	
2012	Nada Brahmam	Oormila	
2012	Oru Nadigaiyin Vaakkumoolam	Girija	Tamil Movie
2012	Breaking News Live	Nayana's mother	
2013	Njan Anaswaran	-	
2013	3 Dots	Lakshmi's mother	
2013	Cleopatra	Mathaji	
2013	Namboothiri Yuvavu @ 43	Madhavi	
2013	Musafir		
2014	Avarude Veedu		
2014	Bad Boys		
2014	Pranayakatha	Lelamma	
2014	Dial 1091		
2014	Oru Korean Padam	Saramma	
2014	Yaan	Lakshmi	Tamil Movie
2014	Ettekaal Second	Neethu's mother	
2014	Koothara	Tharun's mother	
2014	Snehamullaoral Koodayullappol	Sumithra	
2014	Vasanthathinte Kanal Vazhikalil	Antharjanam	
2014	Randaam Varavu	Thampuratti/Ghost	Short film
2014	Mummyude Swantham Achoos	Sandra's mother	
2015	Village Guys	Mythili	
2015	Ellam Chettante Ishtam Pole	Lakshmiyamma	
2015	Mathru Vandhanam	Raju's sister	
2015	Compartment	Nun	
2015	Sukhamayirikkatte	-	
2016	Plus Or Minus	Gayatri	
2016	Maaya Malika	Maya's mother	
2016	Poy Maranju Parayahte	Swayamprabha's mother	
2016	Ameyam	Fathima	Short film
2016	9th Month	Mithra	Short film
2017	Hadiyya	-	
2017	Paw Prints	-	Short film
2018	Nonsense	Principal	
2018	1948 Kaalam Paranjathu	-	
2019	Madhaveeyam	-	
2019	Safe	Nirmala Amma	
2019	Kalikoottukar	Amina	
2019	Venalmazha	-	Music video
2021	Black Coffee	Susy	
2022	Aquarium	Provincial Amma	
2022	PK Rosy	-	
2023	Mukalparappu		
TBA	Thoolika	TBA	

== Television serials ==
- Rakkuyil (Mazhavil Manorama)
- Ottachilambu (Mazhavil Manorama)
- Amruthavarshini (Janam TV)
- Sreekrishnavijayam (Janam TV)
- Njangal Santhushtaranu (Asianet Plus)
- Devimahathmyam (Asianet)
- Kunjalimarakkar (Asianet)
- Pazhassiraja (Surya TV)
- Velankani Mathavu (Surya TV)
- Nizhalattom (DD)
- Mughmariyathey (Surya TV)
- Kathayariyathey (Surya TV)
- Manasariyathe (Surya TV)
- Priyam (Kairali)
- Orma (Asianet)
- Mangalyam (Asianet)
- Nizhalukal (Asianet)
- Sankeerthanam Pole (Asianet)
- Neeti Vacha Madhuvidhu (DD)
- Melottu Kozhiyunna Ilakal (Doordarshan)
- Darussalam (DD)
- Theekkali Internet Pollumbol (Surya TV)
- Manassariyathe (Surya TV)
- Ponnunjal (Asianet)
- Sree Mahabhagavatham (Asianet)
- Kadamattathu Kathanar (Asianet)
- Idavazhiyile Poocha Mindapoocha (Asianet)
- Sthree (Asianet)
- Poothali (Amrita TV)
- Parvanendu
- Manalnagaram
- Parinamam
- Mounanombaram (Kairali TV)
- Sakunam (DD Malayalam) - telefilm
- Ente Mash - telefilm
- Kalippata Kadayile Sthree - telefilm

== TV shows ==
- Ruchibhedham as Presenter
- Thani Nadan as Presenter
- Smart Show as Participant
- Red Carpet as Mentor
