= A. K. Rajagopal =

Indo-American theoretical physicist

A K Rajagopal
- Born: Mysore
- Known for: Contributions to density functional theory and quantum information
- Awards: Fellow of the American Physical Society
- Scientific career
- Fields: Theoretical solid-state physics
- Workplaces: LSU, NRL
- Thesis: Itinerant electron ferromagnetism
- Academic advisors: Harvey Brooks
- Notable students: Gary S. Grest

Attipat Krishnaswamy Rajagopal (commonly known as A K Rajagopal) is an Indian-American theoretical physicist who has contributed to density functional theory (DFT) and quantum information science. He is a Fellow of the American Physical Society (elected in 1970) and spent most of his career first at Louisiana State University and then at the United States Naval Research Laboratory.

== Early years and education ==
Rajagopal was one of four sons and two daughters of A. A. Krishnaswami Ayyangar (1892–1953), an Indian mathematician who taught at the University of Mysore and worked on the history of Indian mathematics. One of his brothers was the poet and scholar A. K. Ramanujan (1929–1993); one of his brothers-in-law was the Indian academic K Bhogishayana (1926-2003). Rajagopal grew up in Mysore, and was an undergraduate at the Department of Physics at Yuvaraja College, Mysore. He earned a master's degree (1960) from the Indian Institute of Science, Bangalore, with a dissertation on lattice vibrations of zinc blende. He then went to Harvard University on a Tata Memorial Travel Grant and a Gordon McKay Prize Fellowship, earning a PhD (1965) with a thesis entitled Itinerant electron ferromagnetism, supervised by Harvey Brooks.

== Career ==
Rajagopal held a faculty position in the Department of Physics and Astronomy at Louisiana State University in Baton Rouge for about two decades, from the mid-1960s until 1985. In 1978 he spent a sabbatical year at the IBM Thomas J. Watson Research Center in Yorktown Heights.

In 1985 he joined the Naval Research Laboratory (NRL) in Washington, D.C., where he conducted theoretical research in condensed matter and statistical physics, including magnetic and superconducting properties of metals and alloys, electron gas theories, long-time relaxation phenomena in complex systems, nanoelectronic structures, nonequilibrium time-dependent density functional theory, Tsallis entropy for nonextensive systems, and later quantum entanglement and information theory. He is now President of the Inspire Institute, a 501(c)(3) nonprofit for scientific research, which was founded in 2006 by a small group of NRL-associated physicists. He has also been an adjunct faculty at the Harish-Chandra Research Institute.

== Research ==
In the 1970s, Rajagopal contributed to the early development of spin-density-functional theory. His paper with J. Callaway, and his later sole author work are credited as laying the rigorous foundations for relativistic DFT. (It is established that relativistic effects play a major role in the electronic properties of materials, as discussed, for instance, in the review on DFT terms by Engle, and other articles in the same source.) He also authored a review of the formalism. Later contributions extended this work toward current-density-functional theory and relativistic formulations, including a 1995 paper with F. A. Buot.

In the last two decades of his career, Rajagopal's research shifted toward quantum information science, including work on quantum entropy, entanglement, the Majorana representation of symmetric multi-qubit states, and generalizations of statistical mechanics (superstatistics) to the quantum domain. Two concepts from this period are referred to using his name in the literature: the "Abe–Rajagopal (AR) q-conditional entropy" and the "Rajagopal–Rendell (RR) quantum deficit".

== Selected publications ==
- Rajagopal, A. K.; Callaway, J. (1973-03-01). "Inhomogeneous Electron Gas". Physical Review B. 7 (5): 1912–1919. Bibcode:1973PhRvB...7.1912R. doi:10.1103/PhysRevB.7.1912. ISSN 0556-2805.
- Rajagopal, A K (1978-12-24). "Inhomogeneous relativistic electron gas". Journal of Physics C: Solid State Physics. 11 (24): L943–L948. Bibcode:1978JPhC...11L.943R. doi:10.1088/0022-3719/11/24/002. ISSN 0022-3719.
- Rajagopal, A. K.; Kimball, John C. (1977-03-01). "Correlations in a two-dimensional electron system". Physical Review B. 15 (5): 2819–2825. Bibcode:1977PhRvB..15.2819R. doi:10.1103/PhysRevB.15.2819. ISSN 0556-2805.
- Pant, M.M.; Rajagopal, A.K. (1972-06-01). "Theory of inhomogeneous magnetic electron gas". Solid State Communications. 10 (12): 1157–1160. Bibcode:1972SSCom..10.1157P. doi:10.1016/0038-1098(72)90934-9.
- Ngai, K. L.; Rendell, R. W.; Rajagopal, A. K.; Teitler, S. (1986-12-01). "Three Coupled Relations for Relaxations in Complex Systems". Annals of the New York Academy of Sciences. 484 (1): 150–184. Bibcode:1986NYASA.484..150N. doi:10.1111/j.1749-6632.1986.tb49569.x. ISSN 0077-8923.
- Ngai, K. L.; Rajagopal, A. K.; Teitler, S. (1988-04-15). "Slowing down of relaxation in a complex system by constraint dynamics". The Journal of Chemical Physics. 88 (8): 5086–5094. Bibcode:1988JChPh..88.5086N. doi:10.1063/1.454662. ISSN 0021-9606.
- Abe, Sumiyoshi; Rajagopal, A.K (2001-01-01). "Nonadditive conditional entropy and its significance for local realism". Physica A: Statistical Mechanics and Its Applications. 289 (1–2): 157–164. arXiv:quant-ph/0001085. Bibcode:2001PhyA..289..157A. doi:10.1016/S0378-4371(00)00476-3.
- Pati, Arun Kumar; Wilde, Mark M.; Devi, A. R. Usha; Rajagopal, A. K.; Sudha (2012-10-08). "Quantum discord and classical correlation can tighten the uncertainty principle in the presence of quantum memory". Physical Review A. 86 (4) 042105. arXiv:1204.3803. Bibcode:2012PhRvA..86d2105P. doi:10.1103/PhysRevA.86.042105. ISSN 1050-2947.

== Awards ==
Rajagopal was elected as a Fellow of the American Physical Society in 1970, and a Fellow of the Washington Academy of Sciences in 1994. He received a Distinguished Research Master award from Louisiana State University in 1984.
