= Rajagopal =

Rajagopal or Raja Gopal is a common name in India. Notable persons with that name include:

== Given name ==
- Rajagopal (professor and researcher), Indian business and marketing expert
- Raja Gopal Of Guler, former king of Guler

=== M ===
- Rajagopal Muthukumaraswamy (born 1936), publisher, librarian, translator and scholar

=== P ===
- Rajagopal P. V. (born 1948), Indian Gandhian activist

=== S ===
- Rajagopal Sathish (born 1981), Indian cricketer
- Rajagopal Seziyan (1923–2017), Indian writer

== Surname ==
=== A ===
- A. Rajagopal, Indian politician, social worker, and lawyer
- A K Rajagopal, Indo-american theoretical physicist

=== C ===
- Cadambathur Tiruvenkatacharlu Rajagopal (1903–1978), Indian mathematician
- Chandran Rajagopal (1974–2001), Indian foreign worker and murderer executed in Singapore

=== D ===
- Dandamudi Rajagopal (1916–1981), Indian weightlifter, bodybuilder, actor, sports administrator, and coach

=== H ===
- Heera Rajagopal (born 1971), Indian actress

=== J ===
- Jijoy Rajagopal (born 1977), Indian actor

=== K ===
- K. Rajagopal (born 1956), Malaysian football player and coach
- K. R. Rajagopal (1950–2025), Indian-American mechanical engineer and professor
- Kuderu Rajagopal (born 1953), Indian educator

=== L ===
- Lagadapati Rajagopal (born 1964), Indian politician

=== M ===
- M. R. Rajagopal (born 1947), Indian physician

=== N ===
- Nisha Rajagopal (born 1980), Indian musician

=== O ===
- O. Rajagopal (born 1929), Indian politician

=== P ===
- P. Rajagopal (Ambur MLA), Indian politician
- P. Rajagopal (businessman) (1947–2019), Indian businessman
- Pakkiri Rajagopal, Indian-American politician

=== R ===
- Rosalind Rajagopal (1903–1996), American educator

=== V ===
- V. Rajagopal (born 1927), Indian cricket umpire
- Vatsala Rajagopal (born 1933), Indian actress
