= Rajagopal P. V. =

Indian activist (born 1948)

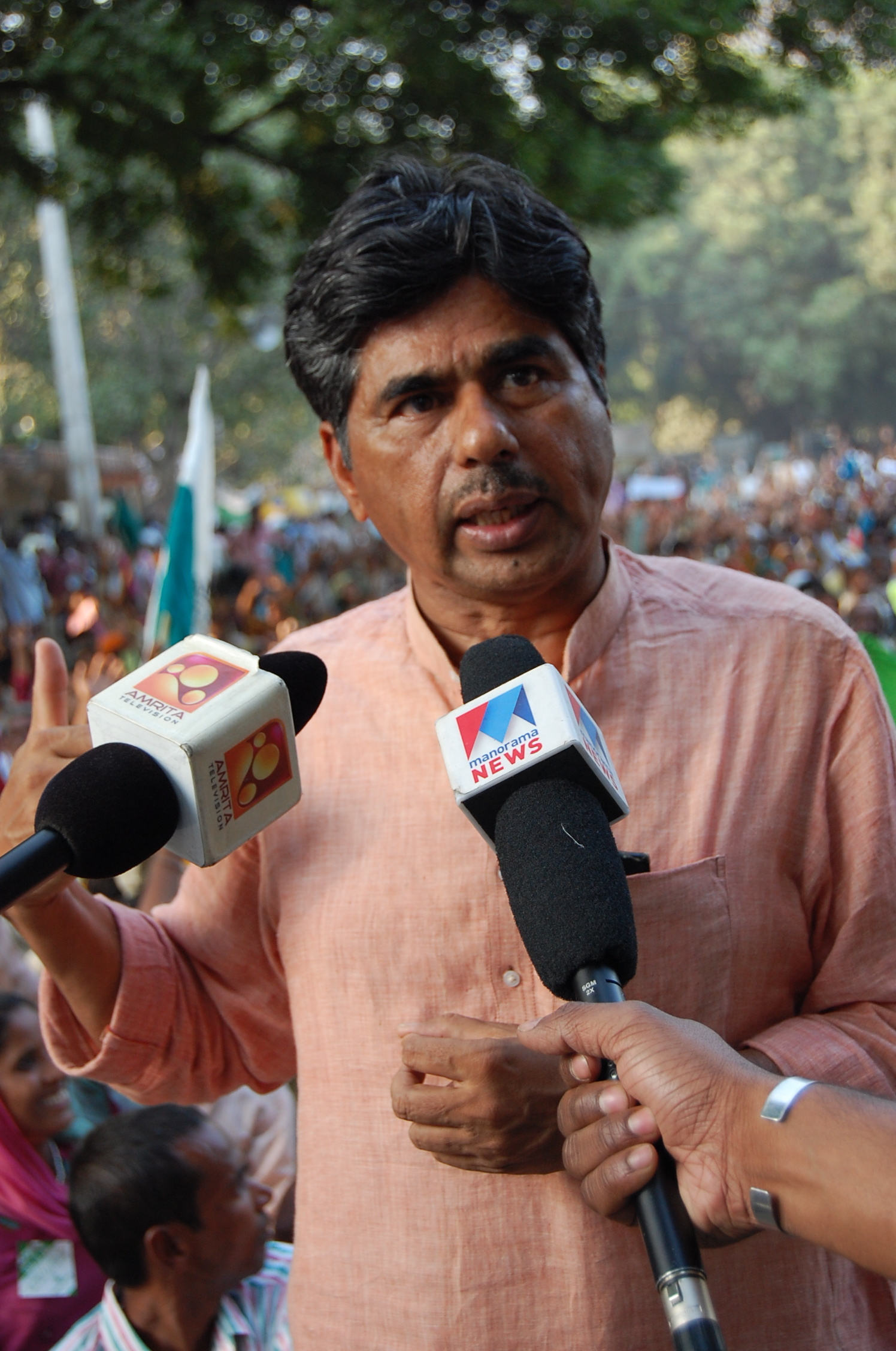
- Rajagopal in October 2007
- Born: Rajagopalan Puthan Veetil; 1948 (age 77–78); Thillenkery, Madras State, then part of the Dominion of India (present-day Kerala, India)
- Education: Diploma in Engineering
- Occupations: Activist, president of Ekta Parishad
- Partner: Jill Carr-Harris

Rajagopal Puthan Veetil (born 1948) is an Indian Gandhian activist, former Vice Chairman of the Gandhi Peace Foundation in New Delhi, and a founding member of Ekta Parishad, a movement advocating for land and resource rights for landless communities. Rajagopal was born in Kerala, India, into a family influenced by Gandhian values and traditions of community service. Through his exposure to local institutions and ashrams during his childhood, he developed an early interest in rural development and social justice.

His background in agricultural engineering led him to participate in community development initiatives across India. In the 1970s, Rajagopal worked in the Chambal region of central India, participating in nonviolent rehabilitation programs for former dacoits. In 1972, he joined an initiative with J.P. Narayan and Subba Rao to facilitate the surrender and rehabilitation of approximately 500 dacoits (bandits) in the region. These experiences in rural conflict zones and grassroots development shaped his long-term commitment to nonviolent activism and the rights of marginalized communities.

In 2012, he led a march of approximately 100,000 supporters to New Delhi to demand land and resource rights for the landless. The movement ended with the signing of an agreement with the Government of India.

Rajagopal was awarded the Niwano Peace Prize in 2023 for his work.

== Early life ==
=== Biography ===
Rajagopal was born in 1948 in Thillenkery, Kerala, the fourth of five children. He attended Seva Mandir School and completed his education in agricultural engineering at Sevagram, Gandhi's ashram in Maharashtra, where he also learned English.

In the early 1970s, he worked in the Chambal region of Madhya Pradesh for the rehabilitation of individuals involved in dacoity (banditry). Since 2001, Rajagopal has been married to Canadian social activist Jill Carr-Harris.

== Activism ==
Under Rajagopal's leadership, Ekta Parishad grew to include 200,000 members across six states, consisting primarily of women.

=== Janadesh 2007 ===
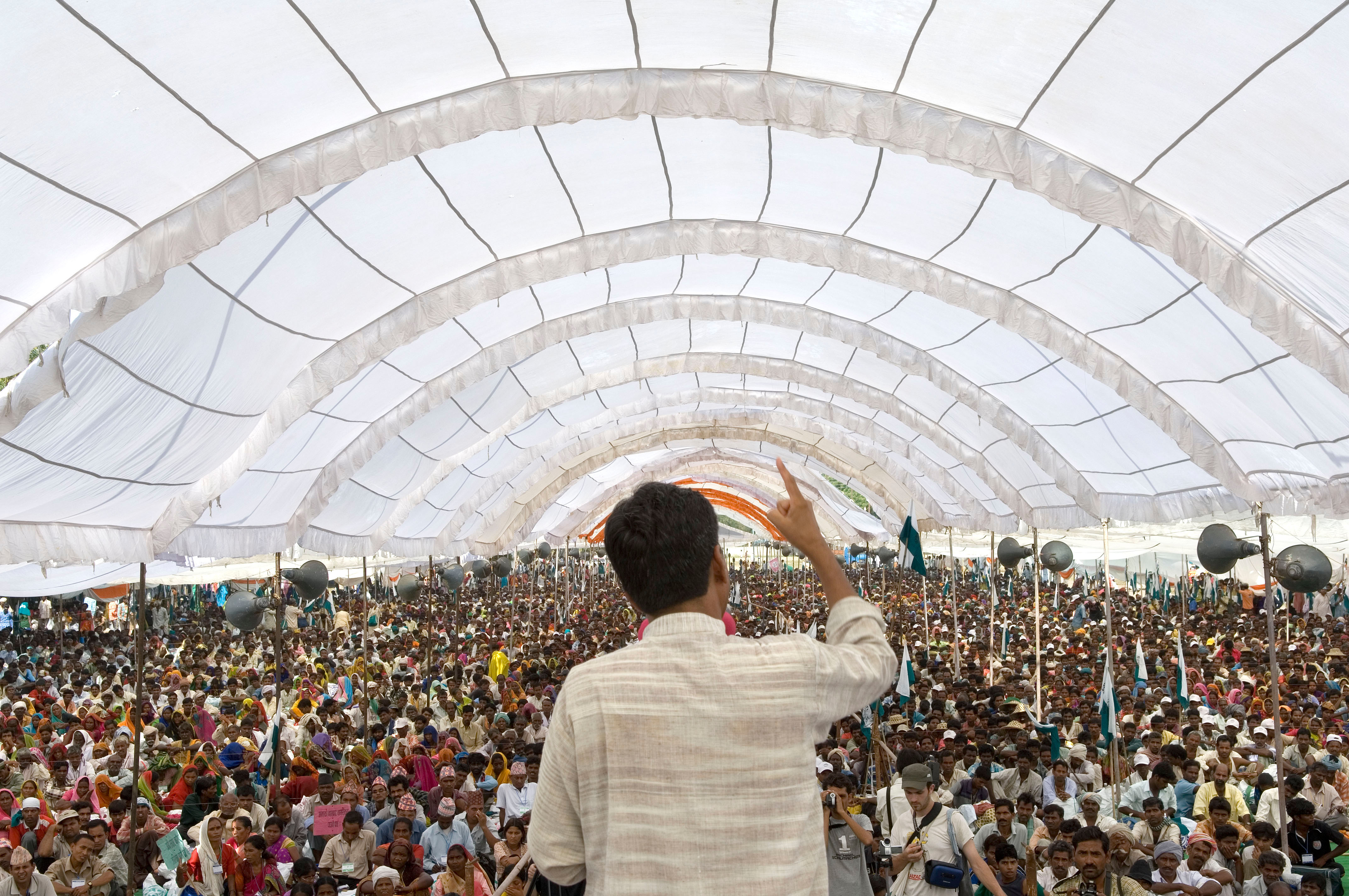
Rajagopal speaking to the crowd in Janadesh 2007

In 2007, Rajagopal led a 340-kilometre march, known as Janadesh (People's Verdict), from Gwalior to Delhi. This march, utilizing non-violent methods such as foot-marches (Padayatra) championed by Gandhi, called on the government to address land and forest rights.

=== Jan Satyagraha 2012 ===
The Jan Satyagraha 2012 march (Yatra) began in Gwalior on 2 October, with the aim of reaching Delhi by 28 October if no agreement was reached with the government. Approximately 35,000 participants joined the march.

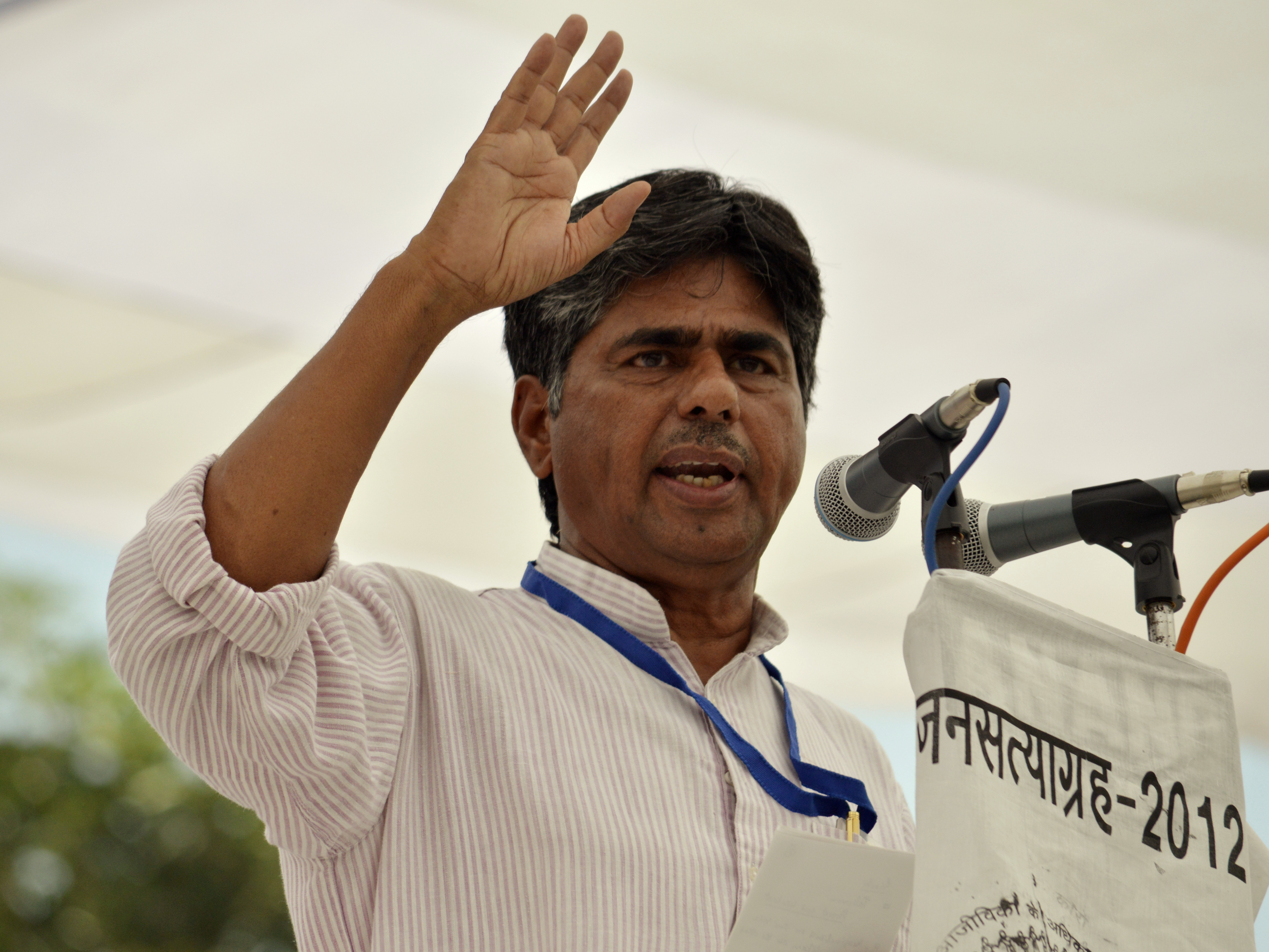
Rajagopal addressing in Jan Satyagraha 2012

=== Jan Andolan 2018 ===
In October 2018, Rajagopal led a march of approximately 25,000 people from Gwalior to Morena, demanding land and tribal rights. The march was initially planned to extend from Haryana to New Delhi. This demonstration took place during the 2018 Madhya Pradesh Legislative Assembly election and several months before the 2019 national elections. Madhya Pradesh Chief Minister Shivraj Singh Chouhan addressed the marchers in Gwalior before their departure, promising to establish a committee to address land rights issues. However, according to Ekta Parishad, the marchers were not satisfied with these proposals and decided to proceed. In Morena, leaders from the Indian National Congress, the main opposition party, addressed the marchers, promising to meet their demands if elected. Ekta Parishad expressed satisfaction with these commitments, deciding to halt the march in Morena instead of continuing to New Delhi as initially planned.

=== Jai Jagat 2020 ===
In 2015, Rajagopal and Ekta Parishad launched the Jai Jagat 2020 campaign as an international movement for justice and peace, aiming to involve civil society organizations and grassroots communities beyond India and Europe.

The 2019–2020 Jai Jagat Global Peace March from Delhi to Geneva expanded outreach to new international organizations and established initiatives in multiple countries.

The march was suspended in Armenia in March 2020 due to the COVID-19 pandemic. A few marches to Geneva at the end of September 2020 marked the last significant mobilization under the umbrella of Jai Jagat, outside India. Since then, local and regional groups have undertaken initiatives such as organizing marches or cartoon exhibitions.

== Advocacy ==
Observers have described Rajagopal's leadership of Ekta Parishad, which includes the mobilization of tribal peoples, women, and youth, and its advocacy for land reform, as an alternative to violent movements like Naxalism in central rural India.

== New land reforms, 2014 and conflicts ==
In response to proposed amendments to the Land Acquisition Act by the Modi government, which sought provisions such as the mandatory consent of 70% of those affected in the case of public-private partnership (PPP) projects and remove the provision requiring a time-bound Social Impact Assessment for land acquisitions, Rajagopal stated that Modi was pro-corporate and that these changes would further aggravate the disparities between the rich and the poor in the country.

== Selected works ==
=== Articles ===
- Voice of Hope and Voice for Change (English) - A collection of articles by Rajagopal P.V. published by the National Center for Advocacy Studies, Pune.
- Land for Life (English) - A collection of village data during the foot march by Rajagopal P.V. published by the National Center for Advocacy Studies, Pune.
- Main ne Dekha Hain (Hindi) - A collection of village stories during the foot march by Rajagopal P.V. published by Ekta Parishad.
- Pagdandiyom par paav (Hindi) - A collection of village people's story during the foot march by Rajagopal P.V. published by Ekta Parishad.
- Gulamon ki Basti se Gujar raha hoon (Hindi) - A collection of village based stories during the foot march by Rajagopal P.V. published by Ekta Parishad.
- Jo Ghar Khoya Apana (Hindi) - A collection of village data during the foot march by Rajagopal P.V. published by Ekta Parishad.
- Sab ki apani Ho Zameen (Hindi) - A collection of village data during the foot march by Rajagopal P.V. published by Ekta Parishad.
- Journey to the other India - A collection of articles in English during the year-long samwad yatra in 2011–2012.
- The legacy of Gandhi, Rajagopal P.V. - A life for non-violent resistance by Carmen Zanella of Switzerland.
- Biography of Rajagopal by Dr. Julius Ruibke of Germany.

=== Audio-Visual ===
- "Janadesh" (People's Verdict) A film on 25,000 people on foot in 2007 from Gwalior to Delhi (English, Hindi, Spanish, German, and French) Film makers from France, Switzerland, Spain, and India.
- "Land First" A Film on Orissa foot march by Amanda, England.
- "Is Small still Beautiful" A Film Broadcast on BBC News, Traccy Winchester, England.
- "Raja's Raise" A Film based on a story of Elephant, Karl Saurer from Switzerland.
- "Ahimsa"(based on Non-Violence training and Social action), Karl Saurer from Switzerland.
- "Jansatyagrah" (Truth Force) Rajagopal and his initiatives, Vikram Nayak, New Delhi.
- "Peoples Movement Processes", Praveen Pagare, Nasik.
- "Jan Chetana Ka Uday" Struggle of Peoples Movement, Ritu Datta, New Delhi.
- "Manzil ki Aur" Community based Nonviolent Struggle for right, Ritu Datta, New Delhi.
- "Millions can walk" Film on Jansatyagraha by Christoph Schaub, Switzerland.
- Nari Shakti Zindabad (Women Empowerment & Leadership), Praveen Pagare, Nasik.
- Interview on DD National - Aaj Savere Program, DD National.

== Awards and recognition ==
Year	Award	Presenter
2008	Friend of the Poor award	Orissa Culture & Youth organization
2008	K. Janardhanan Pillai Endowment award	Gandhi Bhawan, Trivadrum, Kerala
2010	Swaraj Millenium Award	Swadeshi, Kerala
2011	Shri. Kumarapilla Velayudhan Master Award for achievements in the social field	Purnodaya Trust in Trissur, Kerala
2012	Krishi Gaurav Award	Patanjali Pratishthan, Uttarakhand
2012	Gareeb Bandhu Award	Orissa Culture & Youth organization
2012	Human Rights Award	Human Rights Chapter of Geneva, Switzerland
2013	Professor N.A. Karim Award for outstanding Public Service – 2012	Vakkom Moulavi Foundation Trust, Trivandrum, Kerala
2014	Anuvrat Ahimsa Award for International Peace for the year 2013	Anuvrat Global (ANUVIBHA), New Delhi
2015	Spirit of Assisi National Award	Assisi Shanti Kendra, Angamally, Kerala
2015	Indira Gandhi Award for National Integration	Indian National Congress
2016	Honored Jeewan Rakshak Award for his life in service of humanity	Jeewan Rakshak Trust, Rajasthan
2017	Krishi Yoddha Award	Indian Students Parliament
2023	Niwano Peace Prize	Niwano Peace Foundation
