= YCM =

YCM may refer to:

- Y chromosome microdeletion, a family of genetic disorders
- St. Catharines/Niagara District Airport, Ontario, Canada, IATA airport code YCM
- Yacht Club de Monaco
- Yuvaraja's College, Mysore, India
