= Jan Satyagraha 2012 =

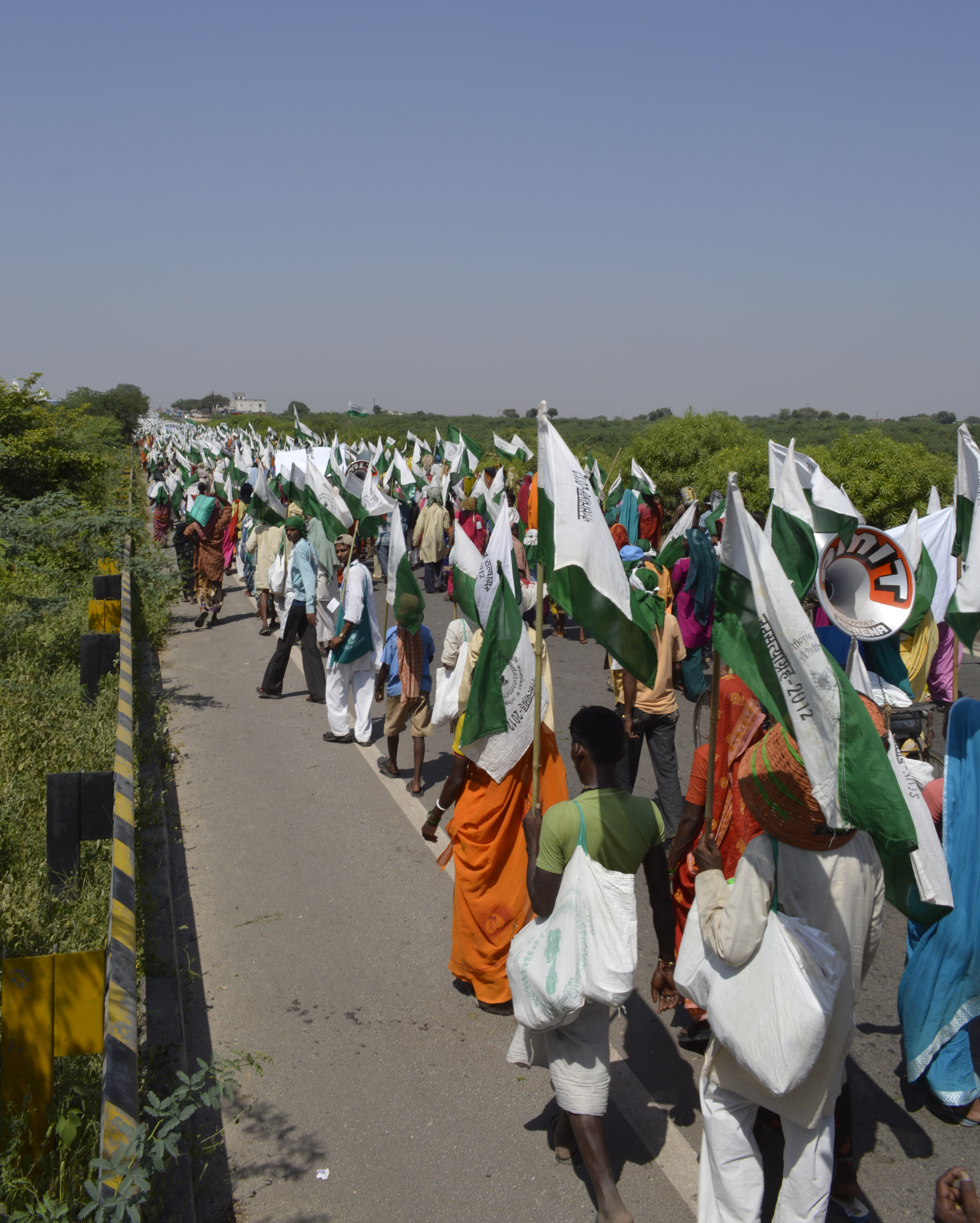
Jan Satyagraha 2012, between Gwalior and Agra

Jan Satyagraha 2012 was a non-violent foot march organized by Ekta Parishad, on a 350 km stretch between Gwalior and Delhi. The march started at Gwalior on 2 October 2012, and arrived in Delhi on 29 October 2012. Jan Satyagraha means "Keenness to Truth" and is based on Mahatma Gandhi's non-violent resistance.

The objective is to obtain "a comprehensive National Land Reforms Act and effective implementation and monitoring institutions to provide access to land and livelihood resources to the poor landless, homeless and marginalized communities". Ekta Parishad is also demanding implementation of PESA or Panchayats (Extension to Scheduled Areas) Act 1996 in tribal areas so that local population have a say in how the land and natural resources in their respective areas are used. They also demand fast-track courts to settle thousands of pending land disputes.

After Janadesh 2007, Ekta Parishad demands included the implementation of the Forest Rights Act, 2008.

Between 20 and 24 September, several meetings took place between representatives of Ekta Parishad and government ministers, but no agreement was reached.

50,000 landless and small farmers gathered in Gwalior on the Mela Ground on 2 October 2012. Jairam Ramesh, Minister of Rural Development, Government of India; Jyotiraditya Madhavrao Scindia, Member of Parliament from the Congress Party; and Rajagopal P. V., president of Ekta Parishad, made speeches. Many other personalities were present.

On 8 October, an Ekta Parishad delegation met again with Ramesh in New Delhi. An agreement was reached and the march stopped at Agra. The two major points of the agreement were:

- establishment of a draft national land reforms policy in the next 6 months, to be finalised soon thereafter.
- adoption of a legal provision to provide agriculture land to landless people and homestead land to homeless people.

== Gallery ==
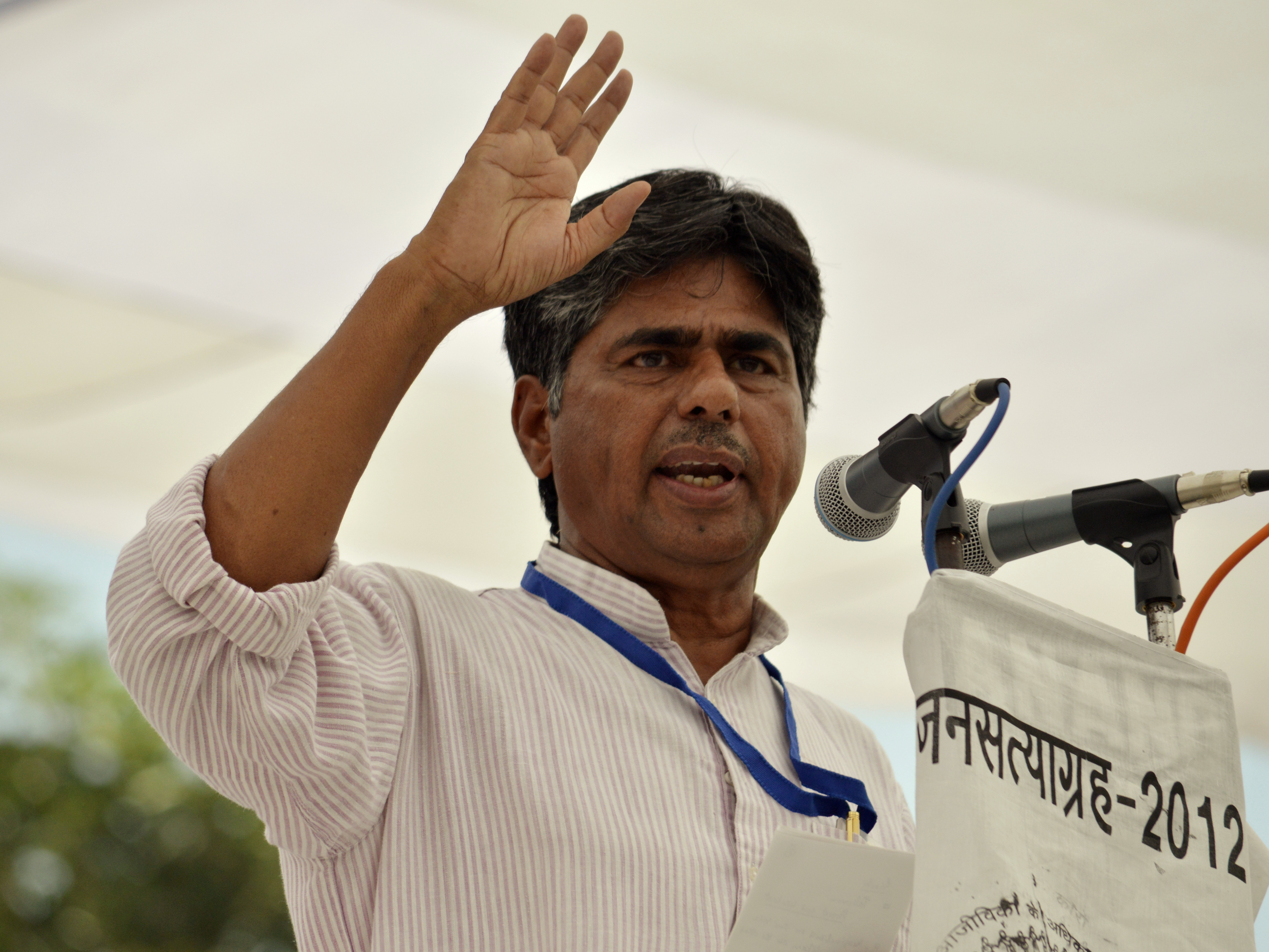
Rajagopal P.V., president of Ekta Parishad

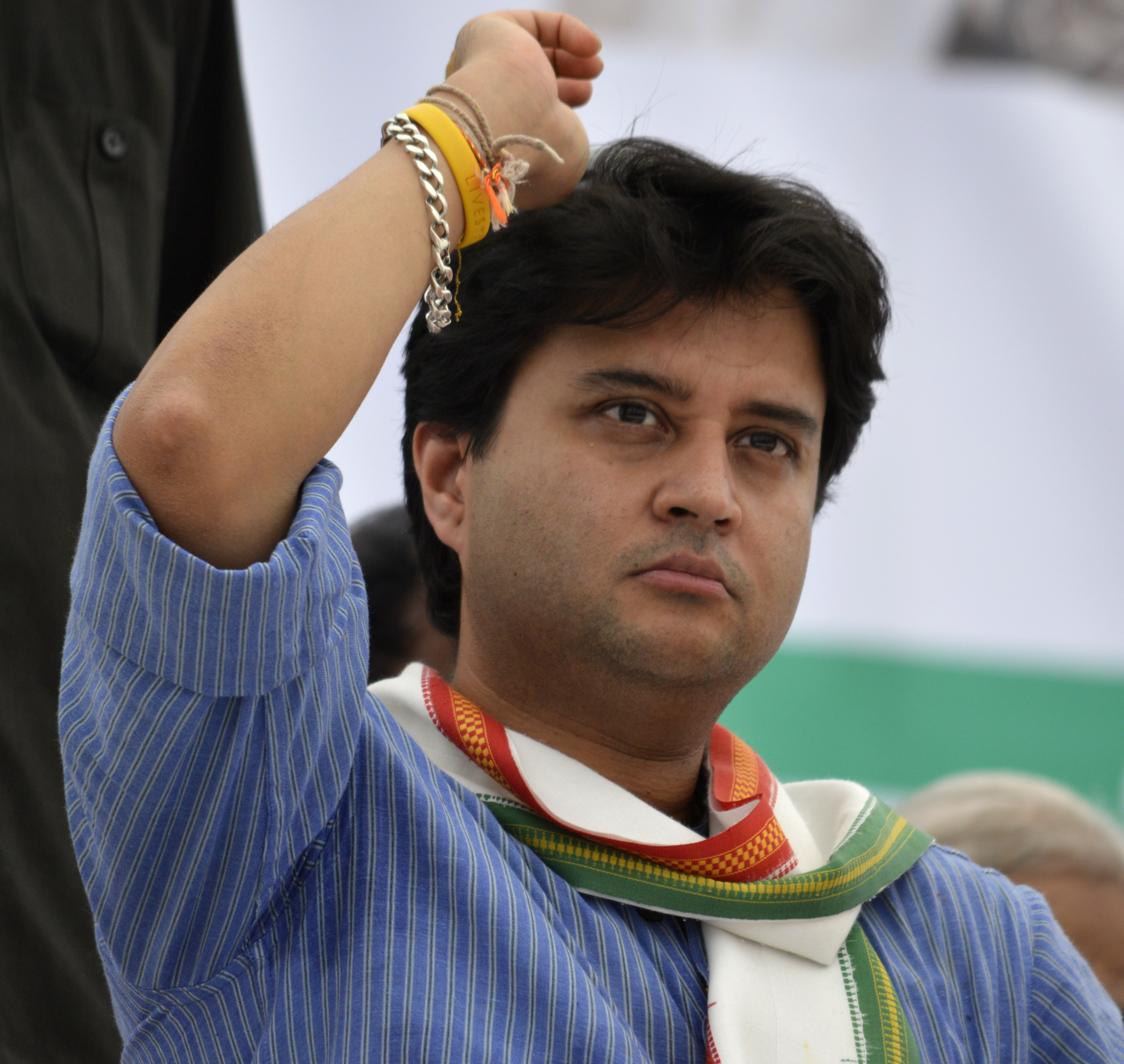
Jyotiraditya M. Scindia, member of parliament

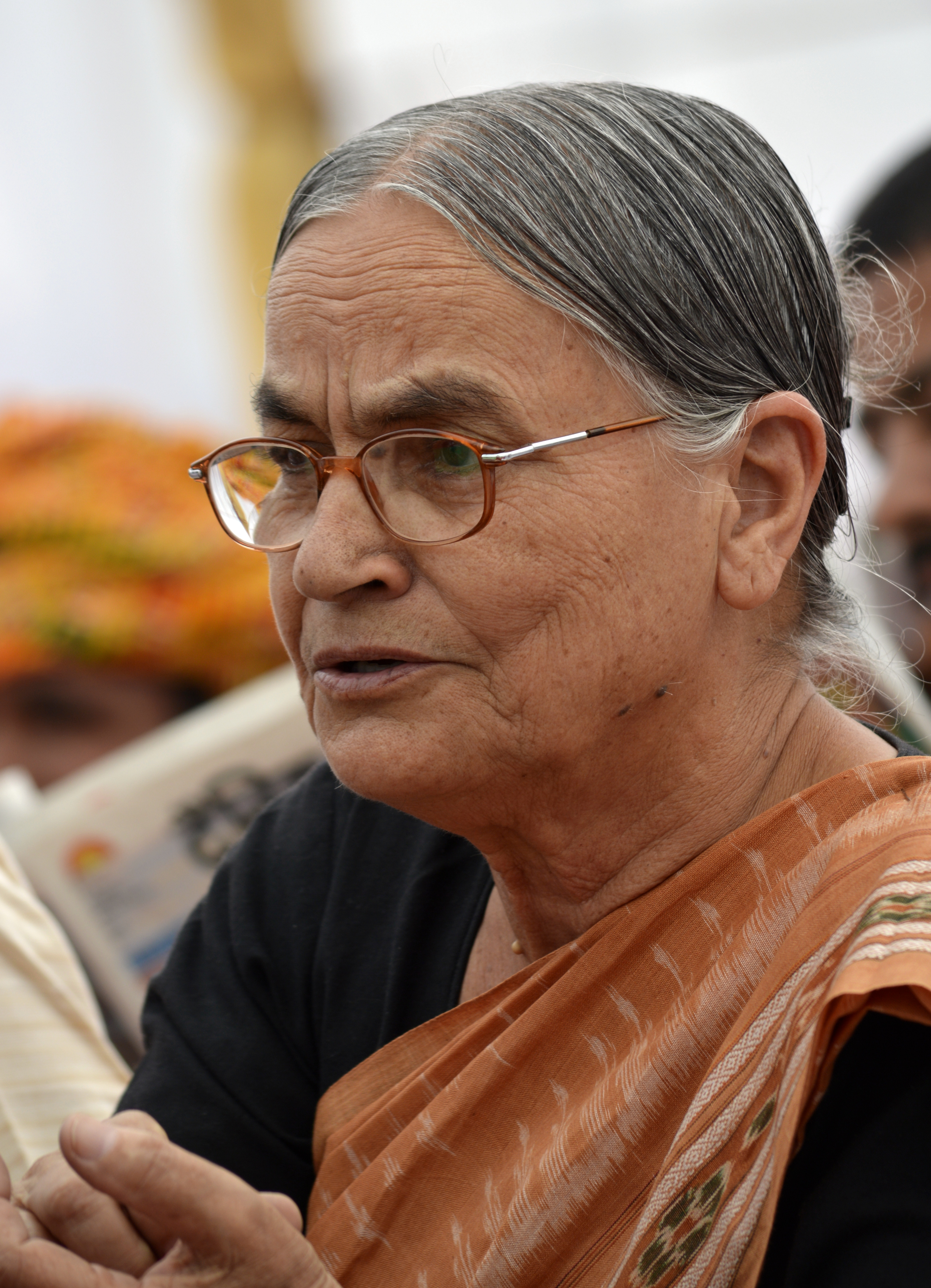
Radha Bhatt, president of the Gandhi Peace Foundation

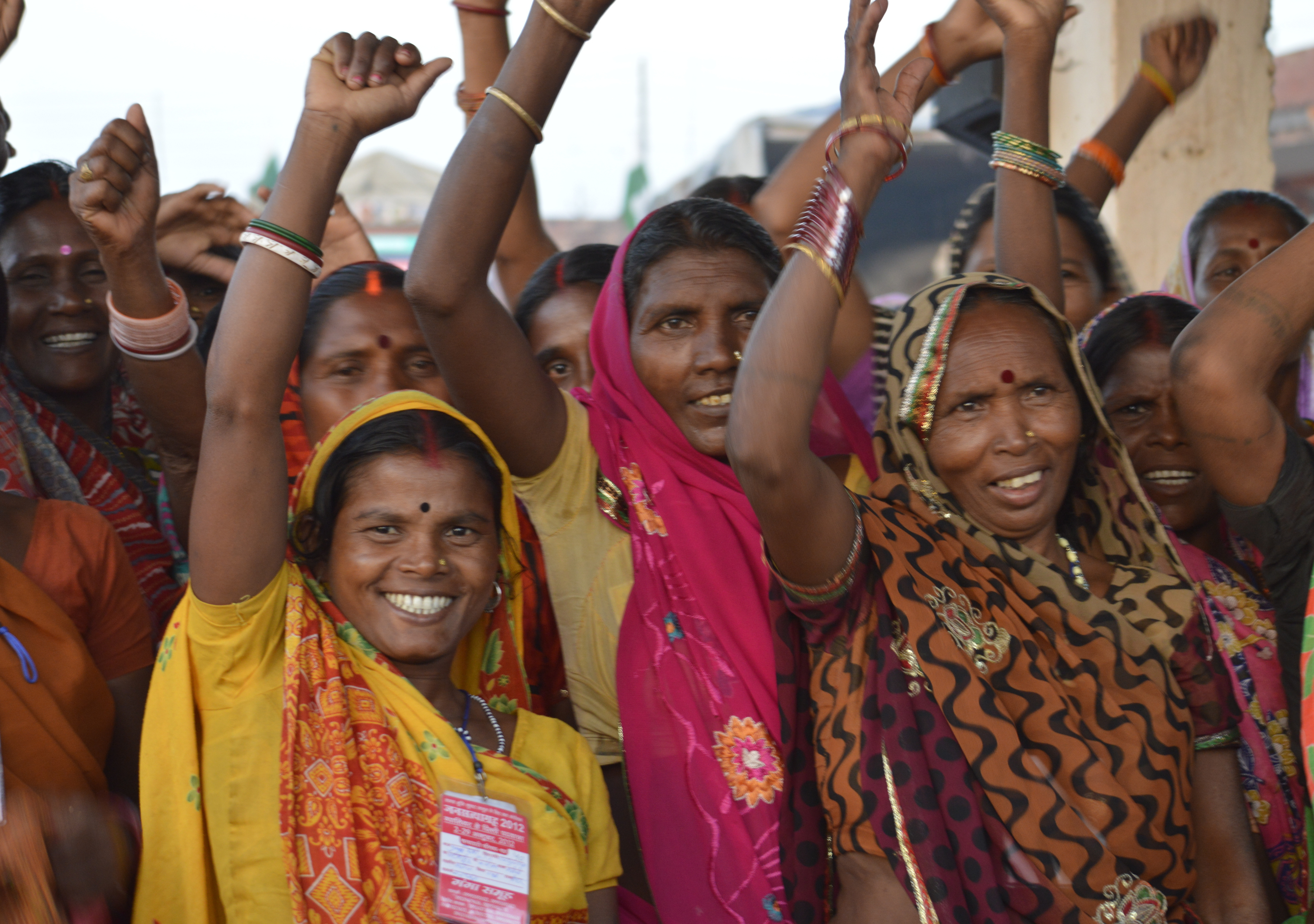
Adivasi women, Gwalior

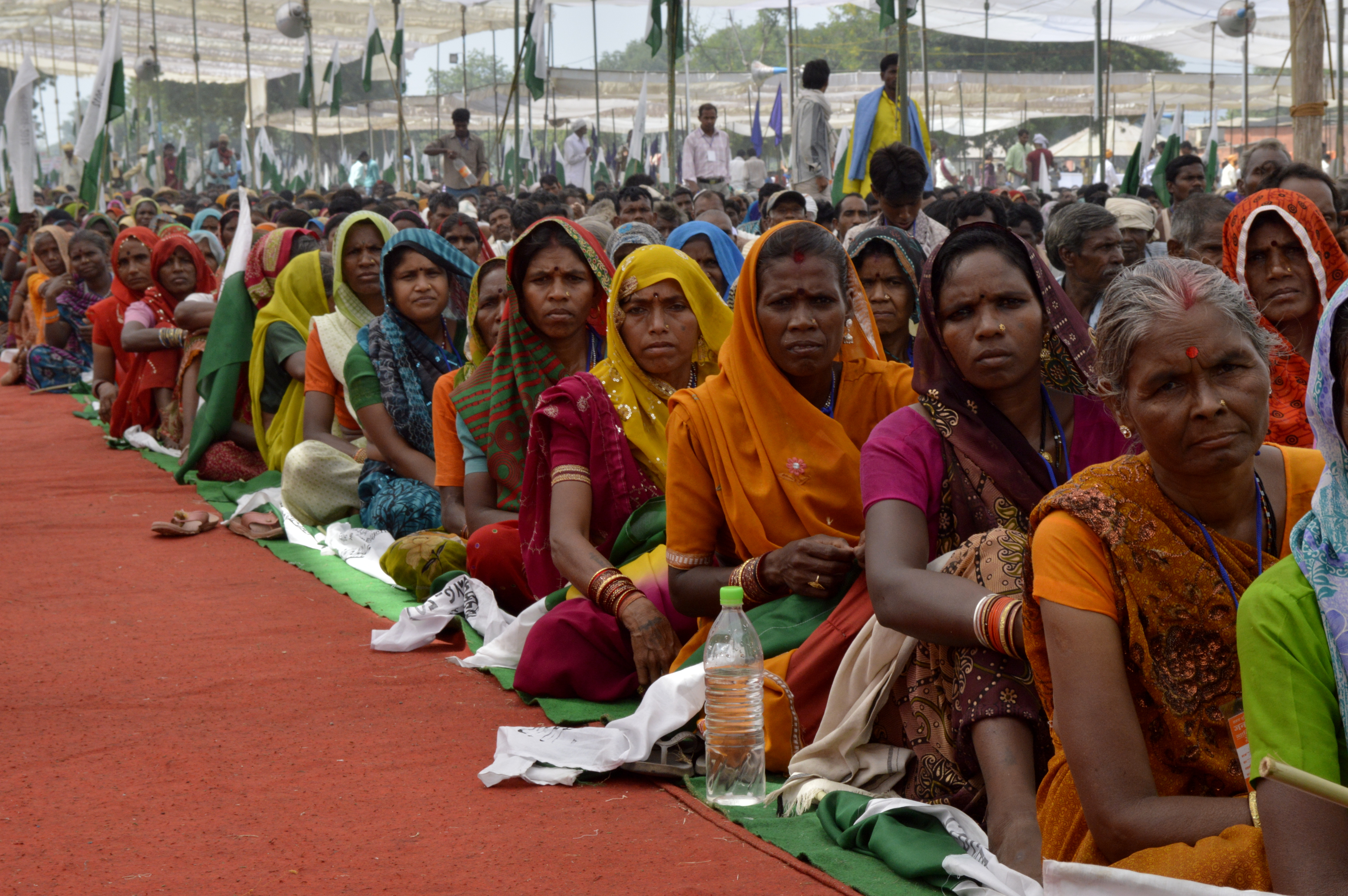
Indian women, Gwalior

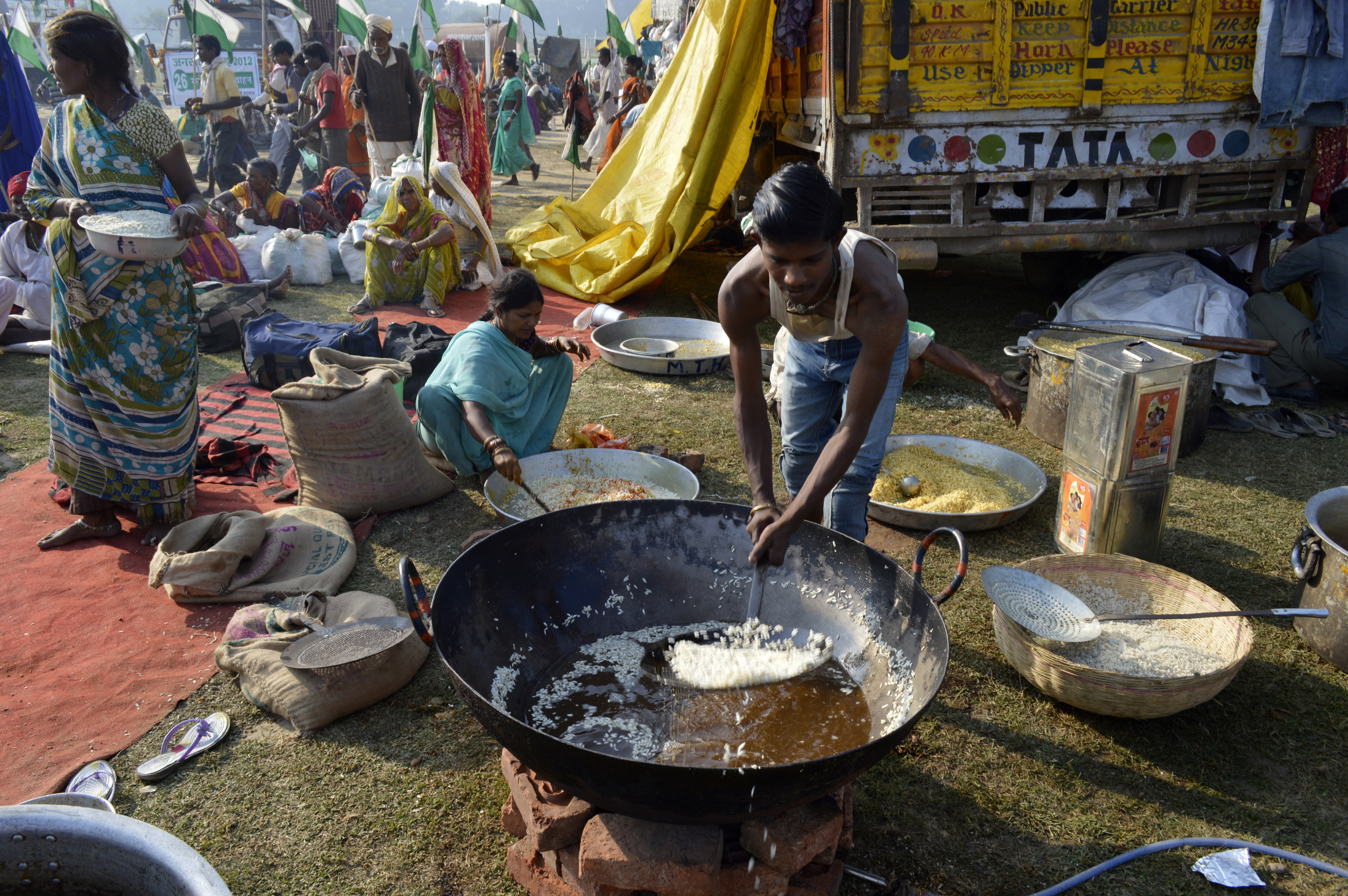
Breakfast preparation, Jan Satyagraha 2012, Agra
