= Lajja Ram Tomar =

Former Hindu nationalist educationist in India

Lajja Ram Tomar or Lajjaram Tomar was a Hindu nationalist schoolteacher and educationist. He was the head of Vidya Bharati, the education wing of Rashtriya Swayamsevak Sangh (RSS), from 1979 until his death in 2004.

== Life and career ==
Tomar was born on 21 July 1930 in a peasant family. He studied in a Baptist Mission School in Agra and joined the RSS as a swayamsevak from his childhood. He received M. A. and B.Ed. degrees and worked as a lecturer.

In 1957, he founded the Saraswati Shishu Mandir in Agra, working as its principal. In 1961, he founded a Saraswati Vidya Mandir, senior secondary school in the RSS schools network. In 1972, he was appointed as the secretary of the entire schools network of RSS in Uttar Pradesh, called the Bharatiya Siksha Sansthan. He became an RSS pracharak in 1977 and was appointed as the Organisational Secretary of Vidya Bharati, the all-India schools network of the RSS, in 1979. He worked from its registered office in Lucknow.

In 1990, he was promoted as the Rashtriya Margadarshak (National Guide) of Vidya Bharati, with Dinanath Batra succeeding him as the Organisational Secretary. In the new role, he worked from the Sanskriti Bhavan in Kurukshetra, until his death in 2004.

== Ideas ==
=== Superiority of "ancient Hindu knowledge" ===
In The Path of Vidya Bharati Thought, Tomar claims that ancient Hindu knowledge predated Western scientific advances; that Rigvedic verses provide the speed of light, Samkhya scholars dated the universe to 2 billion years old, and sage Bharadwaja wrote a text on aviation engineering. (Note: The text attributed to sage Bharadwaja, Vaimānika Shāstra, was analysed by aeronautical engineers from the Indian Institute of Science, who concluded that it dates from no earlier than 1904 and that the craft described there are not capable of flying.)

=== Reception ===
Tomar's views have been criticised. According to Akshay Bakaya:

Tomar’s writings are rich only in the RSS' usual, rather un-spiritual glories, despite the claims that spirituality lies at the basis of all Hindu life.

Bakaya goes on to say that:

In fact, the RSS, like the Arya Samaj before it, seems essentially to generate Hindu-golden-age fantasies as mirror images parasitic upon a rival’s 'original', in every field [...] The delusion is that the world will be impressed with the claim that ancient Indian sages propounded 'scientific' theories similar (indeed identical) to what is now standard in the West, only much earlier.

== Publications ==
- Vidya Bharti Chintan Ki Disha (The Path of Vidya Bharati Thought, 2001), Kurukshetra:Vidya Bharati.
- Pracheen Bhartiya Shiksha Paddhati (The education methods of ancient India, 2014), Suruchi Prakashan, ISBN 9381500150.
- Bhartiya Shiksha ke Mool Tatva (The philosophy of Indian education, 2014), Suruchi Prakashan, ISBN 9381500312.

== Sources ==
- Bakaya, Akshay (2004), "Lessons from Kurukshetra - The RSS Education Project", in Anne Vaugier-Chatterjee (ed.), Education and Democracy in India, New Delhi: Manohar, ISBN 8173046042
- Mukunda, H. S.; Deshpande, S. M.; Nagendra, H. R.; Prabhu, A.; Govindraju, S. P. (1974), "A critical study of the work "Vyamanika Shastra"" (PDF), Scientific Opinion: 5–12
- Organiser (28 November 2004), "Lajja Ram tomar passes away: A life dedicated to education", Organiser
