= Lajja =

Lajja may refer to:

- Lajja (novel), a 1993 novel by Taslima Nasrin
- Lajja (film), a 2001 Indian Hindi-language social drama film
- Lajja (TV series), an Indian television series
- Lajja Goswami (born 1988), Indian sport shooter
- Lajja Ram (1932/3–2015), Indian politician
- Lajja Ram Tomar (1930–2004), Indian educator
- Lajja Shankar Pandey, a character portrayed by Ashutosh Rana in the 1999 Indian film Sangharsh

== See also ==
- Laaj (disambiguation)
