= K Bhogishayana =

Indian Academic

K. Bhogishayana
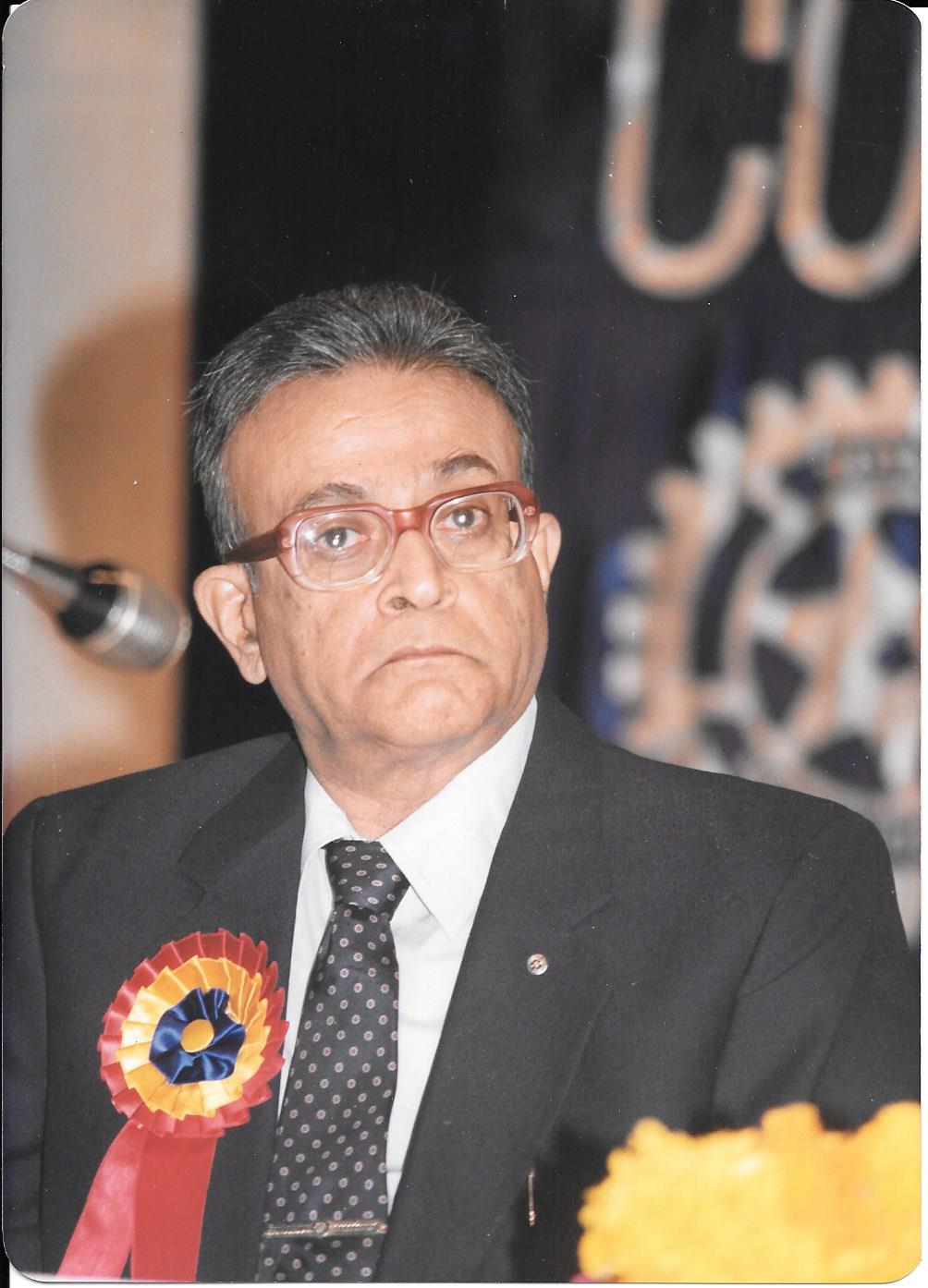
- Born: 1 June 1926; Mysore, Karnataka, India
- Died: 14 July 2003 (aged 77); Solapur, Maharashtra
- Education: Mysore University; Maharaja’s College
- Known for: Vice-Chancellor of Shivaji University

K Bhogishayana (1 June 1926 – 14 July 2003) was an Indian educator and teacher, who served as a vice-chancellor of Shivaji University.

== Early life and education ==
Bhogishayana was born in Mysore, Karnataka on 1 June 1926 in an orthodox Hindu family. He was the youngest of 9 children. Born in a strict household, he had to concentrate on his studies from a very young age. He studied at the University of Mysore where he obtained an M.A. in English, earning the Purna Krishna Rao Gold Medal for graduating at the top of his class.

== Professional life ==
Early in his career, Bhogishayana was a lecturer in English at various colleges in Mysore, Bengaluru, Belgaum and Solapur. His professional career took off in Solapur at Sangameshwar College. He began as a lecturer at Sangameshwar College in 1953 and was promoted to principal in 1960.

Bhogishayana was responsible for much of the growth of the college in his role as principal. An intellectual himself, he valued students who were athletes. Bhogishayana was awarded the Ideal Teacher Award for College and University Teachers by the Government of Maharashtra in 1976–77.

As principal of Sangameshwar College, he was involved in the work of the administration of Shivaji University, with several positions on the Senate and several boards of the University. As a member of the Senate, he often presented the budget. Bhogishayana was elected the Dean of the Faculty of Arts, which led to him serving as the Interim Vice-Chancellor in 1973, 1979 and 1980. Bhogishayana was appointed as the Vice-Chancellor of Shivaji University in 1983. He also served on the Academic Council of Pune University. He retired at the end of his term as Vice-Chancellor in 1986.

=== Student Strike at Sangameshwar College ===
In 1972 students at the Dr. V. M. Government Medical College went on strike to eliminate capitation fees. This spread across all the colleges in Solapur, and the students rallied in Sangameshwar College. Police in riot gear threatened the students who were inside. Bhogishayana stood at the college gate and informed the armed police that they would have to get past him before they got to the students.

== Volunteering work ==
=== Rotary club ===
Bhogishayana joined the Rotary Club of Solapur in 1967. Soon after joining, he became the branch's president. He was unanimously elected the District Governor of Rotary International District 3170 in 1979. He represented the Rotary International President at district conferences and served at Rotary Institutes.

In his honor, the Rotary Club of Solapur holds an oration by a renowned speaker each year. In 2023, the speaker was Uday Umesh Lalit, the former chief justice of the Supreme Court of India.

=== Other ===
In addition to Bhogishayana's extensive work in the Rotary, he served on several boards and government commissions

- Member of the District Vigilance Committee for Backward Classes appointed by the Government of Government of Maharashtra
- Member of the Divisional Railway Users Consultative Committee
- Member of the Tope Commission appointed to investigate the Dr. V. M. Government Medical College in Solapur, which was taken over by the Government of Maharastra in 1974
- President of the Sangameshwar Education Society
- President of the Family Planning Association of India, Solapur Branch
- Served on the board of management of the Solapur branch of the Red Cross
- In 1989 co-founded the LEPRA society, a partner of the UK based Lepra charity. dedicated to reduce the incidence and impact of leprosy and other diseases in India.

== Personal life ==
In 1952 he married Vedavathi, the daughter of the mathematician A. A. Krishnaswami Ayyangar and the sister of poet and linguist A. K. Ramanujan. Ramanujan was a colleague and had introduced him to Vedavathi.

Bhogishayana died on 14 July 2003 at the age of 77. He is survived by his wife and daughters.
