= Dinanath Batra =

Indian schoolteacher (1930–2024)

- Born: 3 March 1930; Rajanpur, Punjab Province, British India
- Died: 7 November 2024 (aged 94)

Dinanath Batra, also spelled Dina Nath Batra, (3 March 1930 – 7 November 2024) was an Indian educationist who was the general secretary of Vidya Bharati, the school network run by the Rashtriya Swayamsevak Sangh (RSS). He also founded the educational activist organisations Shiksha Bachao Andolan Samiti and Shiksha Sanskriti Utthan Nyas.

== Background ==
Dinanath Batra was born on 3 March 1930 in Dera Gazi Khan in Punjab (present-day Pakistan), into a Punjabi Hindu family. He worked as the headmaster of the Dayananda Anglo-Vedic School at Dera Bassi in Patiala district, Indian Punjab. In 1966, he was appointed headmaster of the Geeta Senior School in Kurukshetra, the first school set up by the RSS. He was an RSS pracharak.

Batra died on 7 November 2024, at the age of 94.

== Activism ==
=== Vidya Bharati ===
Batra was appointed the full-time general secretary of the RSS schools network Vidya Bharati in 1990.

=== Notice to Sonia Gandhi ===
On 30 May 2001, Batra served a legal notice to Sonia Gandhi, president of the Indian National Congress. Batra stated that a resolution passed by the All India Congress Committee at its plenary session included statements that were defamatory towards Vidya Bharati. According to Batra, the resolution had stated that textbooks used by Vidya Bharati promoted negative attitude and violence towards minorities, justified the caste system, sati and child marriage as being a part of Indian culture, and contained superstitions and concocted facts inimical to scientific temper.

=== Litigation against NCERT ===
In 2006, Batra filed a Public Interest Litigation against the National Council of Educational Research and Training (NCERT), in which he raised 70 objections about the contents of secondary school history and social science textbooks. Some objections were based on the argument that Lala Lajpat Rai, Bal Gangadhar Tilak, Bipin Chandra Pal, Aurobindo Ghosh, and Bhagat Singh had been wrongly described as "militants". Another objection was to statements that Indo Aryans, including Brahmins, had consumed beef as a part of their diet in ancient times. Batra stated that this was a falsehood, and that cows had been worshiped in India since Vedic times. The Delhi High Court directed NCERT to form a committee to study the objections. A three-member committee concluded that of the 70 pieces of content that had been objected to, 37 had already been replaced by that year, 29 were to remain unchanged, and 4 were to be modified. The committee declined to modify the statement about Indo-Aryans eating beef, stating that it was factual.

=== Opposition to sex education ===
On 15 May 2007, acting on the advice of Batra, the Chief Minister of Madhya Pradesh Shivraj Singh Chouhan removed sex education from the state curriculum on the grounds that it offended Indian values. Batra suggested that yoga be added to the curriculum instead of sex education. This view was criticised by S. Anandhi, a scholar of gender issues, who wrote that sexeducation was aimed at combating child sexual abuse, and controlling the spread of HIV/AIDS by encouraging safe sexual practices. She also stated that fundamentalist organisations were attempting to repress sexuality. Later that year, Batra wrote a letter on behalf of the Shiksha Bachao Andolan Samiti, which stated that parents can possibly book instructors on the charge of "outraging the modesty of a woman or dishonouring a person."

=== Petition against Ramanujan's essay ===
In 2008, Batra petitioned the Delhi High Court on behalf of Shiksha Bachao Andolan Samiti, seeking the removal of A.K. Ramanujan's essay, Three Hundred Ramayanas: Five Examples and Three Thoughts on Translation, from the Delhi University's history syllabus. The essay discusses the many texts and presentations of the Ramayana that appear across the globe. In response to the petition, the university set up a committee of experts to study the essay. The committee found nothing controversial about the work, and this sentiment was echoed by outside scholars. However, the university's academic council decided to remove the essay from the syllabus, in a move that was widely criticised by scholars, but welcomed by a narrow section academics in Shiksha Bachao Andolan Samiti.

=== Legal notices to authors ===
On 3 March 2010, Batra sent a legal notice to Wendy Doniger, Penguin Group USA and the Penguin India subsidiary, raising several objections on the book The Hindus: An Alternative History by Doniger. In 2011, Batra filed suit against Doniger and Penguin Publishing under Section 295A of the Indian Penal Code, which punishes acts intended to cause outrage or offend the sentiments of religious communities. In February 2014, pursuant to a settlement agreement, Penguin India withdrew all unsold copies of the book and pulped them, leading to sharp criticism.

Later, that year he also sent a legal notice to N. Ram, the editor of Frontline magazine, for printing a cover article titled Shortcut to Hindu Rashtra. On 3 March 2014, Batra sent a legal notice to the Aleph Book Company demanding that another book by Wendy Doniger, On Hinduism, be withdrawn.

In May 2014, academic publisher Orient Blackswan halted the release of a book, Communalism and Sexual Violence: Ahmedabad since 1969 by Megha Kumar, after it received a legal notice from Batra claiming the book is defamatory and derogatory to the RSS. The publisher in a letter to the author explained that it was assessing the book before the release. The publisher also put another book, From Plassey to Partition: A History of Modern India by Sekhar Bandyopadhyay, under review after his notice.

=== Textbook authorship ===
On 30 June 2014, the Bharatiya Janata Party government of Gujarat issued a circular, declaring six text books written by Batra to be part of the state education curriculum as supplementary literature. Originally written in Hindi, the books were translated into Gujarati, and were released by Bhupendrasinh Chudasama, the state education minister, who stated that they were compulsory. Batra has indicated that the initiative for using the books came from the Narendra Modi government in Gujarat, and the books carry a foreword from Modi.

The books among other things, asserted that cars were invented in ancient India and urged students to draw the geographic map of an Akhand Bharat, that includes countries including Pakistan, Bangladesh, Afghanistan etc. They received severe criticism from historians as well as the popular press. Historian Romila Thapar stated that the books contained "not history, but fantasy." Irfan Habib, another prominent historian, described them as "hilarious but scary". He said that the books were being introduced as part of a political program, and also stated that "The point here is whether the person has any semblance of scholarship, any track record."

On 1 August, the local Congress division in Vadodara protested the books by burning their covers. The city's BJP unit criticised the act and called it an insult to the national leaders as the covers had pictures of some national leaders.

=== Appointment to Haryana education committee ===
On 12 November 2014, the newly elected BJP government of Haryana state announced that Batra would be appointed to a new committee of educationalists. The committee would consist of retired teachers and professors from the state.

=== NCERT Textbook objections ===
In July 2017, Batra submitted another list of objections against the NCERT textbooks on various subjects.

== Publications ==
- The Enemies of Indianisation: The Children of Marx, Macaulay and Madarasa, 2001
- Bharatiya Shiksha Ka Swaroop (in Hindi). Prabhat Prakashan. 2014. p. 272. ISBN 9789350489826.
