= Padayatra =

Journey undertaken by politicians

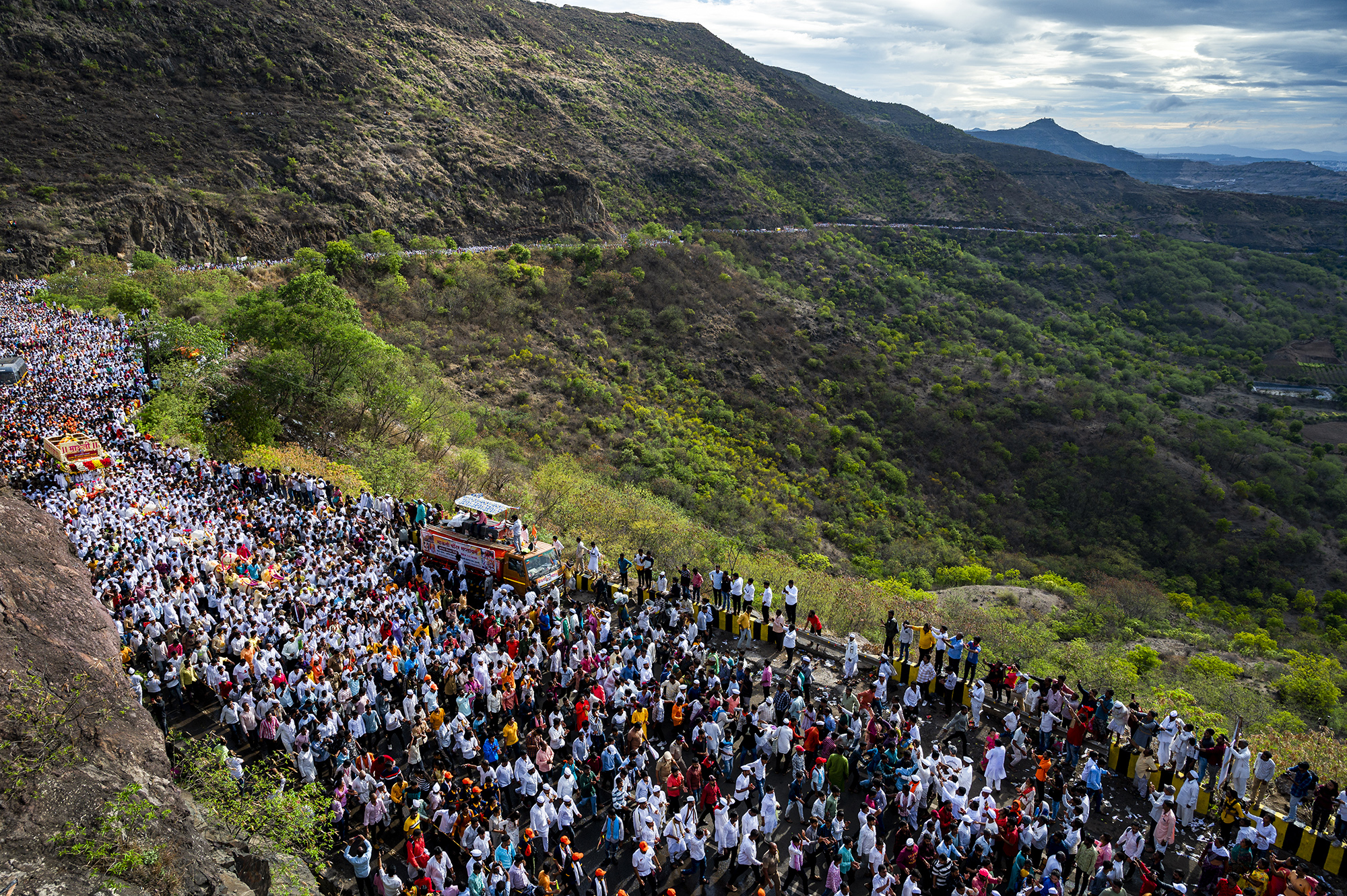
Thousands taking part in Ashadhi Vari (Warkari) the annual Hindu religious padayatra at Dive Ghat, Maharashtra, 2022

A padayatra (Sanskrit: पदयात्रा, romanized: padayātrā, lit. 'journey by foot') is a journey undertaken on foot, used both as a political–mass outreach tool and a spiritual pilgrimage (yatra). It is a journey undertaken by politicians or prominent citizens to interact more closely with different parts of society, educate about issues concerning them, and galvanise their supporters. Padayatras or foot pilgrimages are also Hindu religious pilgrimages undertaken towards sacred shrines or pilgrimage sites.

In its political form, a padayatra enables leaders to move beyond conventional rallies and engage directly with communities across towns and villages, symbolising accessibility, humility, and solidarity. In its religious or spiritual aspect, it continues an ancient Indian tradition of travelling on foot through sacred landscapes, transforming walking itself into an act of devotion and self-purification. Beyond its practical purpose, a padayatra often embodies a message of reform, unity, or faith, linking movement with meaning and turning collective footsteps into a symbol of transformation. Notable padayatras in India include Mahatma Gandhi's 1930 Dandi March against the British salt tax, Vinoba Bhave's Bhoodan Yatra advocating land reform, and contemporary political marches. On the religious front, annual pilgrimages like Pandharpur Wari, Amarnath Yatra and Kanwar Yatra are prominent.

== Types of Padayatras ==
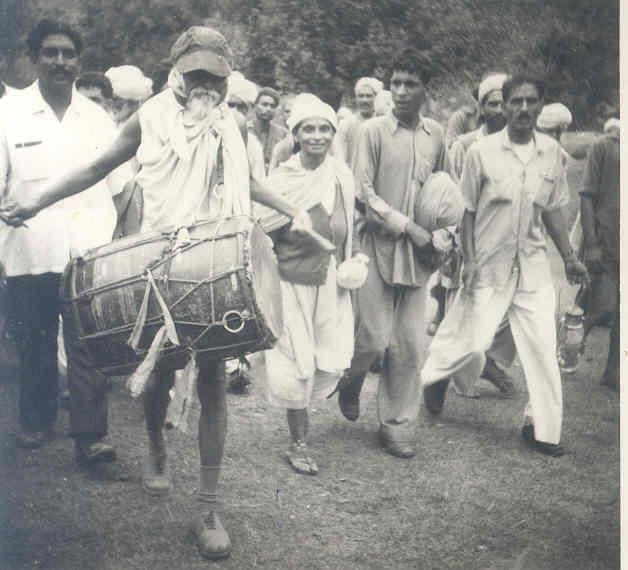
Gandhian Vinoba Bhave during his padayantra across India, as part of Bhoodan movement, a voluntary land reform movement in 1951.

=== Social causes ===
In the winter of 1933–34, Mahatma Gandhi went on a countrywide padayatra against untouchability. Later, Gandhian Vinoba Bhave also started a padayatra, which was part of his Bhoodan movement in 1951. Starting from the Telangana region, Bhave concluded his padayatra at Bodh Gaya. On 6 January 1983, Chandra Shekhar started his padayatra from Kanyakumari and continued his 4,260 kilometres (2,650 mi) journey to Raj Ghat in Delhi till 25 June 1983 to understand the problems of the masses.

Puthan Veetil Rajagopal, in Janadesh 2007, led 25,000 landless peasants on a 28-day march from Gwalior to Delhi. In 1986, Ramon Magsaysay Award winner Rajendra Singh started padayatras through villages of Rajasthan, promoting construction and revival of johads and check dams.

=== Religious causes ===
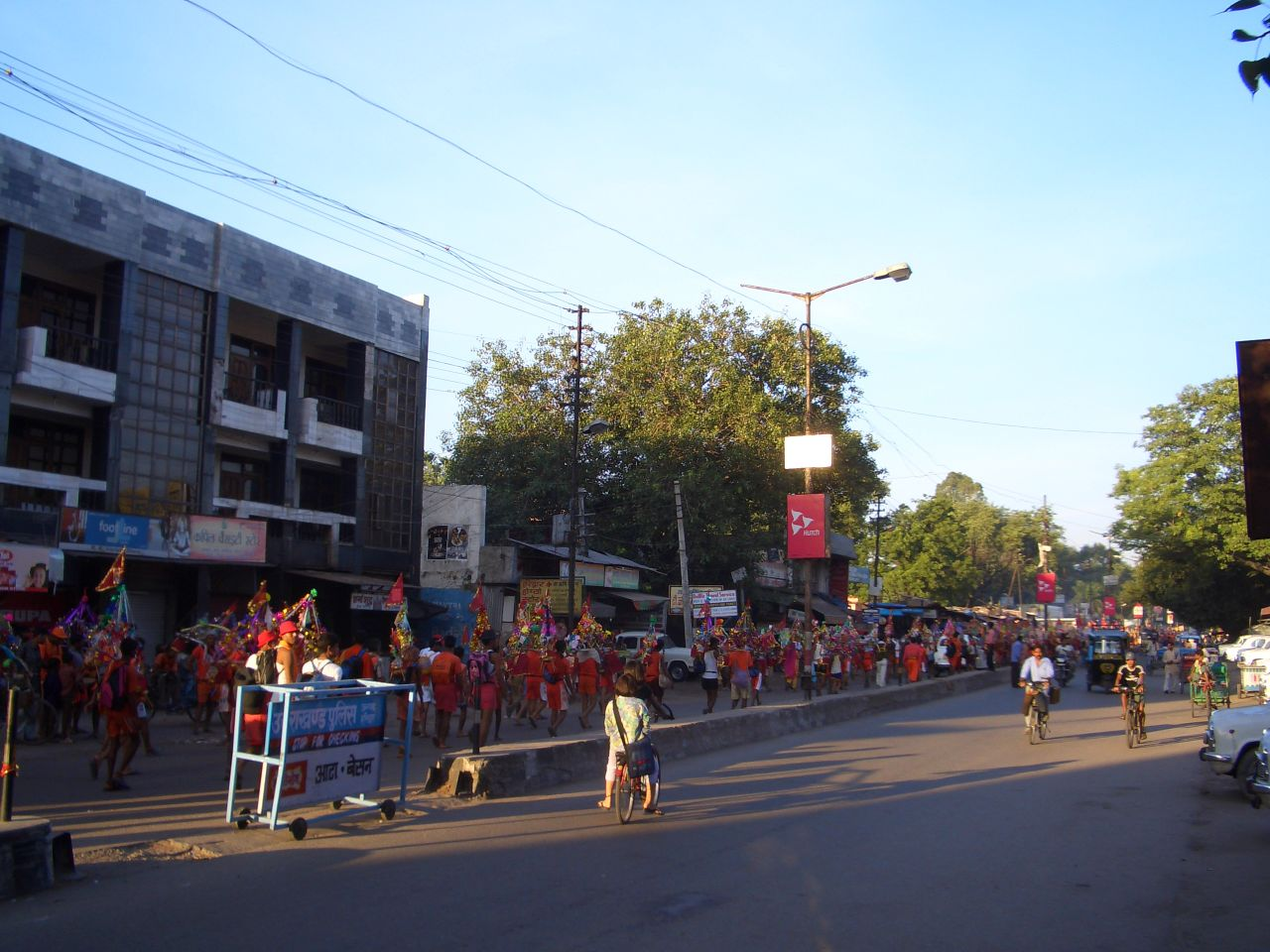
Kanwar Yatra in pilgrimage town Haridwar, 2007

The warkaris from the Maharashtra state of western India practice a regular walk to religious places like Dehu, Alandi and Pandharpur. Ashadhi Ekadashi, Kartiki Ekadashi, Maghi Ekadashi and Chaitra Ekadashi are some of the popular days when pilgrims reach Pandharpur to worship Vithoba.

The kanwariyas practice a regular walk to religious places like Kashi Vishwanath Temple, Kedarnath Temple, Neelkanth Mahadev Temple, Vaidyanath Temple, Mahakaleshwar Temple, Amarnath Temple etc. Maha Shivaratri and Kanwar Yatra are some of the popular days when pilgrims reach the temples to worship Shiva.

=== Political causes ===
Gandhi on the Salt March, 1930 part of India's independence movement

Mahatma Gandhi originated the padayatra with his famous Salt March to Dandi in 1930, this was done to protest against the new Salt taxes imposed by the British rule. Y. S. Rajasekhara Reddy did a 66-day-long padayatra covering 1,500 km (930 mi), meeting people across 11 districts of Andhra Pradesh. He led his party to victory in the following general elections held in 2004 to become the chief minister of Andhra Pradesh, which included Telangana also.

The YSRCP chief Y. S. Jaganmohan Reddy launched his Padayatra named ‘Praja Sankalpa Yatra’ at RK Valley in his native Kadapa district after paying homage at the grave of his father. YSR Congress party coined a slogan “Raavali Jagan, Kaavali Jagan” (Jagan should come. We want Jagan) for the foot march that took to him across 125 Assembly segments in 13 districts of the state in 430 days. This Yatra was started on November 6, 2017, and ended on January 9, 2019.

The Indian National Congress, under the leadership of Rahul Gandhi, started Bharat Jodo Yatra, a padyatra on September 7, 2022, in Kanniyakumari at the tip of the Indian peninsula. This foot march will cover about 3,570 km in around five months. It will move across 12 States and two Union Territories, and shall end in Kashmir.

== See also ==
- Selma to Montgomery marches
- Suffrage Hikes
- Acharya Mahashraman
