= K. Rajagopal =

K. Rajagopal may refer to:

- K. Rajagopal (film editor) (born 1952), Indian film editor
- Kuderu Rajagopal (born 1953), Indian educator and administrator
- K. Rajagopal (footballer) (born 1956), Malaysian football manager
- K. Rajagopal (director) (born 1965), Singaporean film director
