= Jai Jagat 2020 =

International march for peace and justice

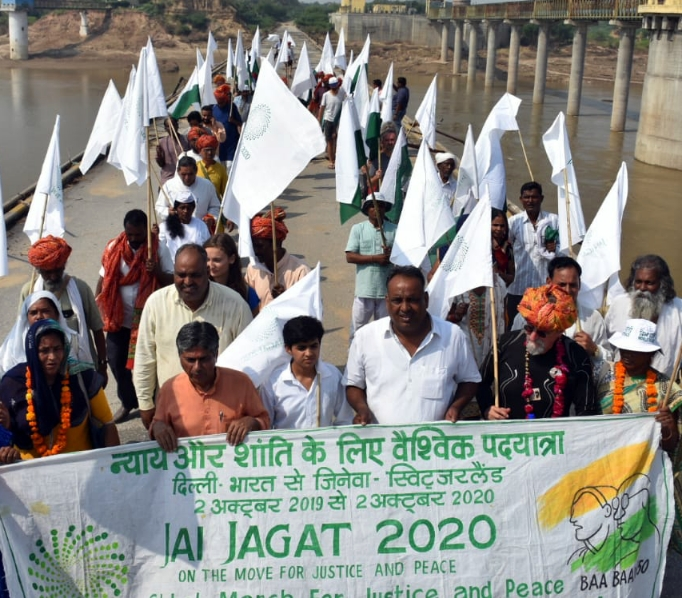
Jai Jagat 2020 crossing the Chambal River, Madhya Pradesh, India

Jai Jagat 2020 is an international campaign for justice and peace initiated by Rajagopal P. V. and Jill Carr-Harris. The main action is a march from Rajghat, New Delhi, to the United Nations headquarters in Geneva, Switzerland. It started on October 2, 2019, on the 150th anniversary of Mahatma Gandhi. Around 50 people from at least 10 countries walked 10,000 km during one year. It will arrive in Geneva on October 2, 2020. The march crossed 10 countries: India, Iran, Armenia, Georgia, Bulgaria, Serbia, Bosnia and Herzegovina, Croatia, Italy, and Switzerland. In addition, a small delegation was going to Pakistan.

The objectives were based on the Sustainable Development Goals of the United Nations, especially eradication of poverty, reduction of discrimination, fight against climate change, and nonviolent conflict resolution.

In India, the march reached Sevagram, in Maharashtra, where it arrived on January 30, 2020, after crossing Delhi, Haryana, Uttar Pradesh, Madhya Pradesh.

The march was stopped in Armenia on March 15, 2020, because of the COVID-19 pandemic. Several marches from Belgium, Sweden, Germany, France, and Spain were planned to converge to Geneva, but only small marches from France actually happened.

== Gallery ==
A few images of Jai Jagat in India

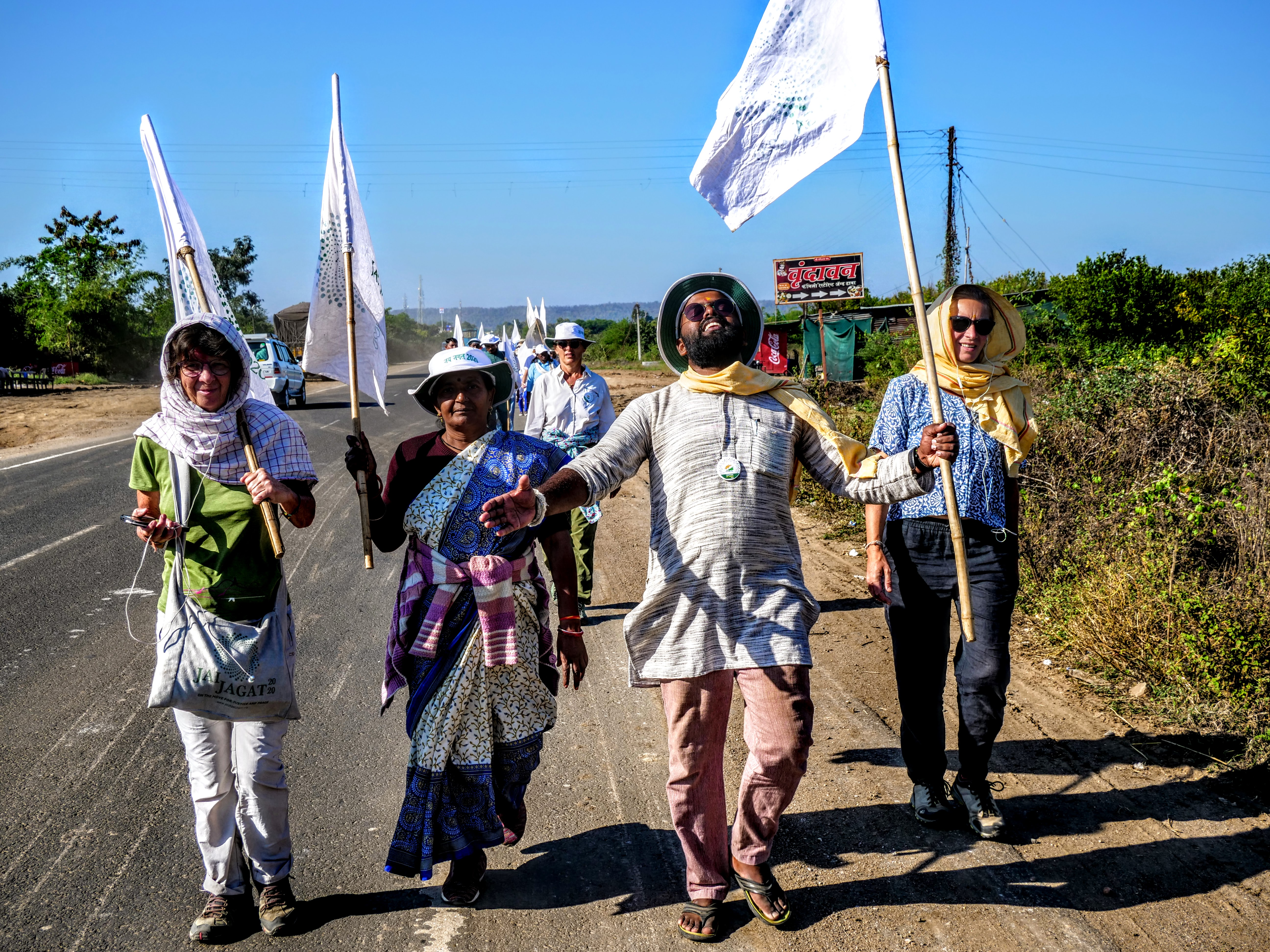
Walking on the road

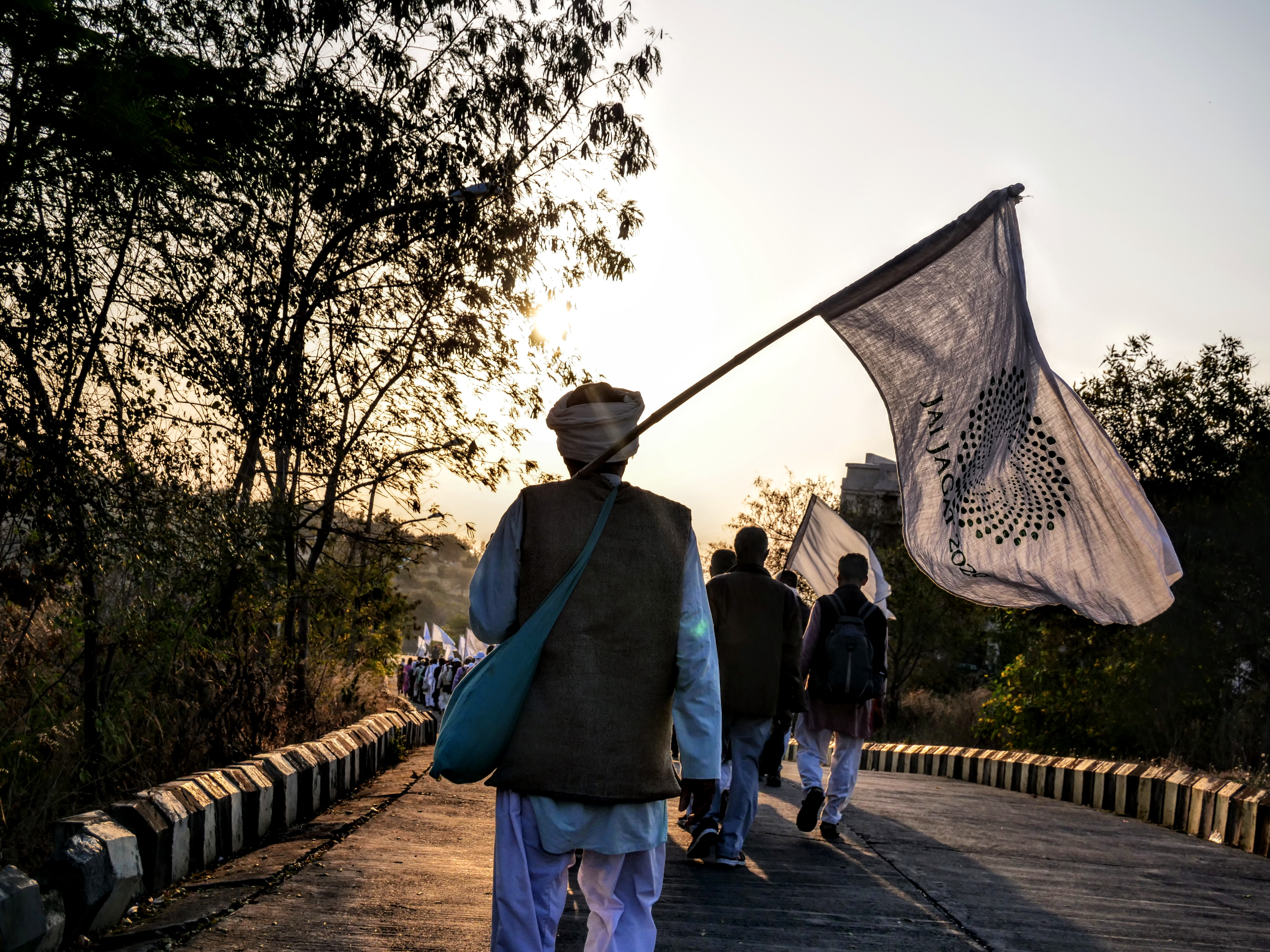
Walking with the flag

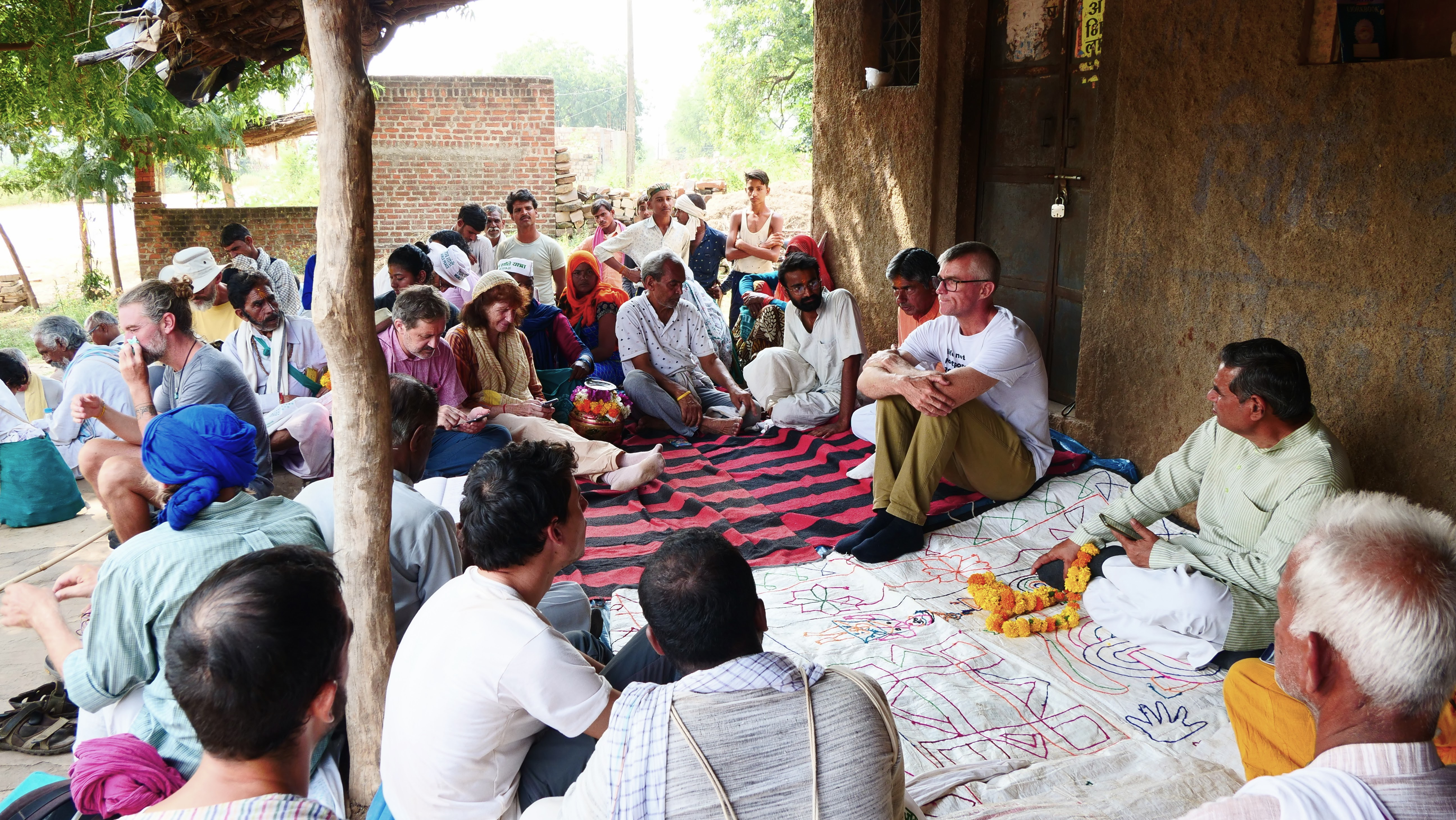
Village meeting

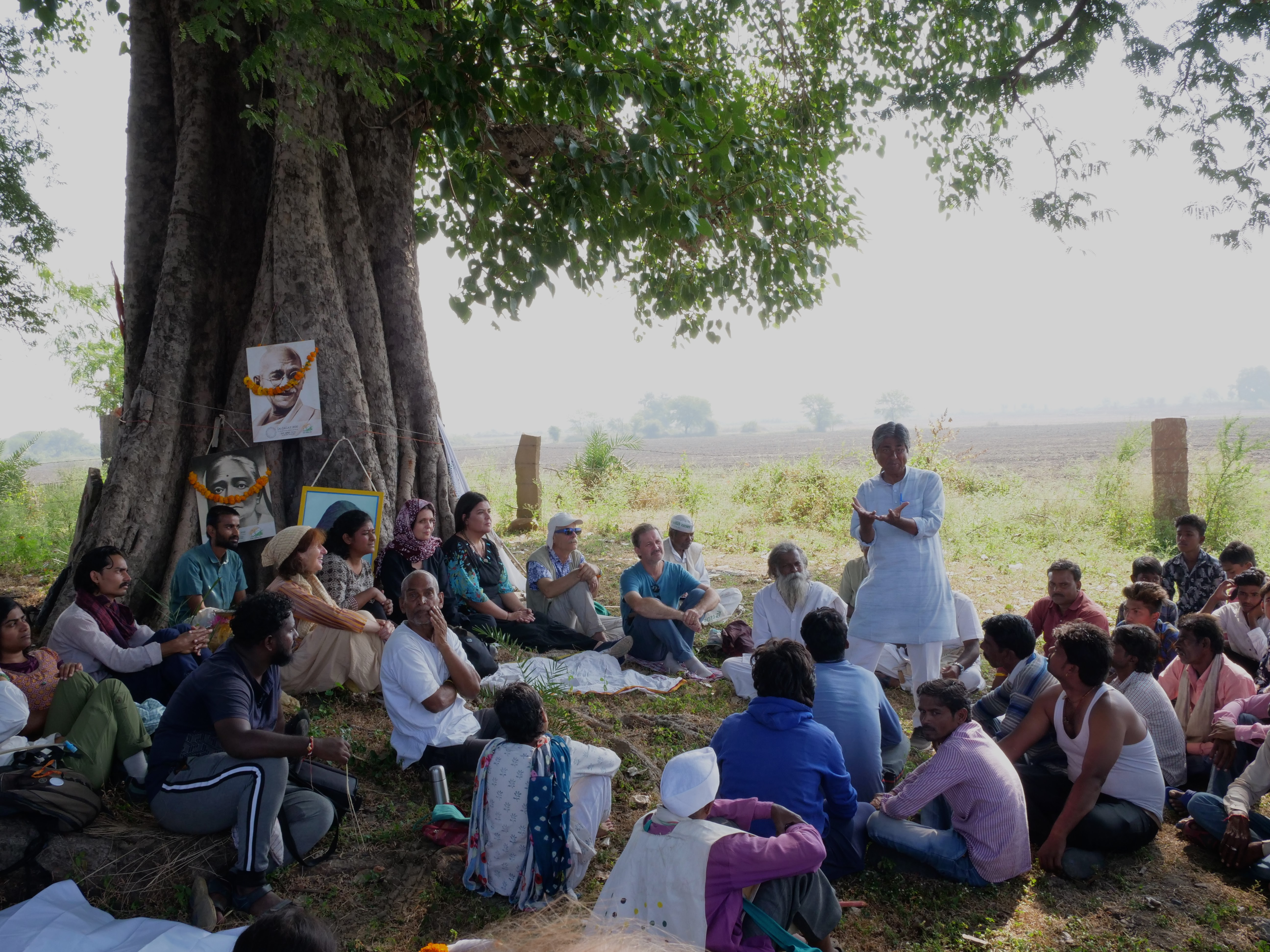
Tree shade meeting

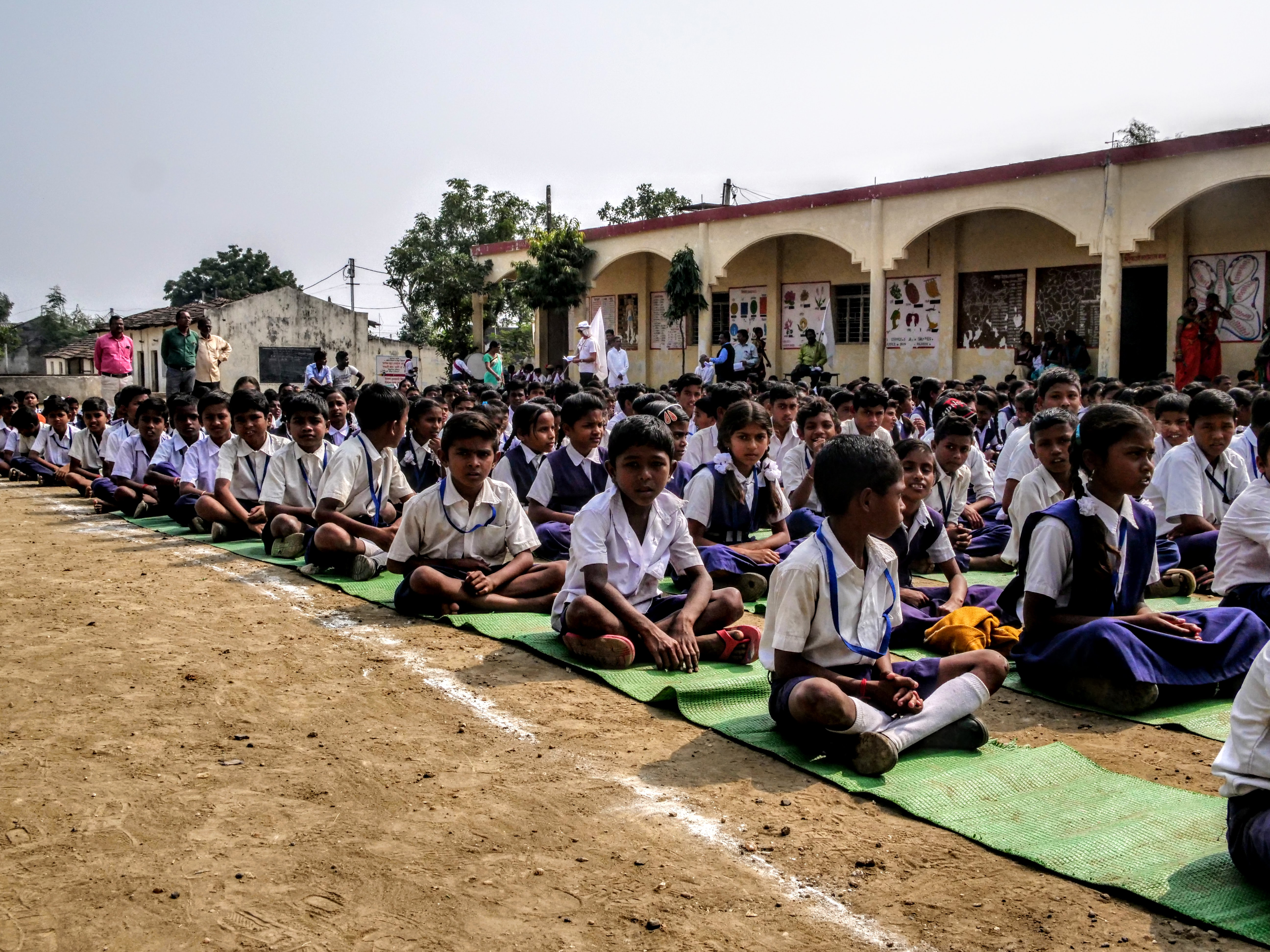
School meeting

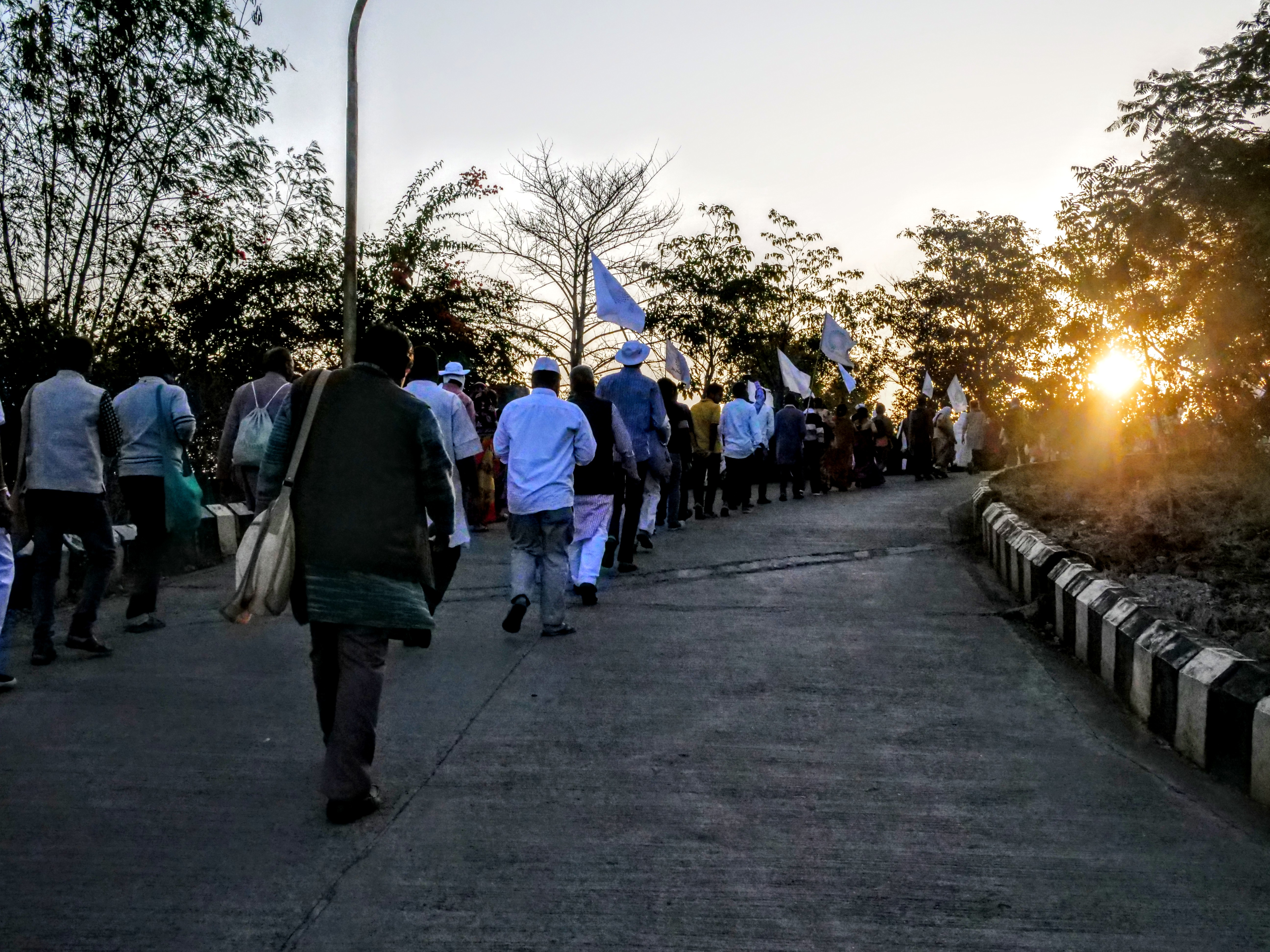
Last day walking in India
