= Laaj =

Laaj may refer to:

- Laaj (film), a 2003 Pakistani Urdu-language film
- Laaj (TV series), a 2016 Pakistani romantic television series

== See also ==
- Lajja (disambiguation)
