= Praja Sankalpa Yatra =

Political event

- Date: 6 November 2017 — 09 January 2019
- Duration: 341 days
- Location: Andhra Pradesh
- Motive: Andhra Pradesh 2019 Election Campaign
- Organised by: YSR Congress Party
- Participants: Y. S. Jagan Mohan Reddy

Praja Sankalpa Yatra was a foot march that was undertaken by Y. S. Jagan Mohan Reddy starting 6 November 2017, for 341 days till 09 January 2019, when he walked over 3,648 km and met around two crore people. This was done in the run up to the 2019 Andhra Pradesh Legislative Assembly election. The YSR Congress Party has claimed it to be the largest Padayatra by any Indian politician till date.

== Development ==
Praja Sankalpa Yatra was a foot march campaign started by Andhra Pradesh's former leader of opposition Y. S. Jagan Mohan Reddy, objected to pitch inghimself as an alternative to former chief minister of Andhra Pradesh N. Chandrababu Naidu. The campaign was launched on 6 November 2017 with the slogan Ravali Jagan Kavali Jagan (Jagan should come, We need Jagan) san taddressedover 5000 public meetings in 175 assembly constituencies of Andhra Pradesh.

A set of nine welfare programs, also called as Navaratnalu were promised by YS Jagan during the campaign which were delivered once he was elected as the chief minister of Andhra Pradesthe h post 2019 state assembly elections.

After 341 days of Praja Sankalpa Yatra covering the distance of 3,648 km through 13 districts on foot, it was finally concluded at Ichchapuram on 10 January 2019, making it the longest Padayatra by any politician in India.

== Key Moments ==
- Y. S. Jagan Mohan Reddy has interacted with around two crore people which also included meetings with select groups such as farmers, fishermen, auto drivers, teachers, Nayee Brahmins, weavers, goldsmiths, anganwadi teachers, advocates, ambulance employees, government employees and unemployed youth.
- The campaign covered 134 out of 175 assembly constituencies in Andhra Pradesh.
- Andhra Pradesh's tourism minister Muttamsetti Srinivasa Rao has led a rally at Bheemunipatnam on 6 November 2020 marking the third anniversary of Praja Sankalpa Yatra.
- Y. S. Jagan Mohan Reddy was attacked by a person claiming to be his fan at Visakhapatnam Airport with a knife while he was returning from Praja Sankalpa Yatra in Vizianagaram district.
