= Molly Daniels (author) =

Indian-American writer and educator

- Born: Molly Daniels; 2 July 1932 Thiruvalla, India
- Died: 26 November 2015 (aged 83) Ithaca, New York
- Occupation: Writer, educator
- Spouse: A. K. Ramanujan (m. 1962; div. 1971) (m. 1974; div. 1988)

Molly Daniels (also Shourie Daniels, Molly Daniels-Ramanujan; 2 July 1932 – 26 November 2015) was an Indian-American writer of fiction and criticism, who also taught writing.

== Education and Career ==
Daniels was born in 1932 in Thiruvalla, India. She went to Indiana University Bloomington on a Fulbright scholarship in 1961. She earned a doctorate at the University of Chicago in 1986.

Haladi Meenu, a work of fiction written by Daniels and translated to Kannada by A. K. Ramanujan, was published in 1966. (The English original, Yellow Fish, was never published.) Daniels' novel The Salt Doll came out in 1978. Upon re-issue in 2018, the novel was received as "an exhilarating exercise in wit and verve" and as a "remarkable but forgotten book, that is almost a palimpsest of Arundhati Roy’s God of Small Things". In 1984, Daniels wrote G. V. Desani: Writer and Worldview, a monograph on the British-Indian writer. She returned to fiction in 1986 with A City of Children and Other Stories. Daniels later wrote The Prophetic Novel (1991), a critical essay on the inter-weaving of multiple belief systems in E. M. Forster's A Passage to India.

Daniels taught writing for many years, both at the University of Chicago's continuing education program and at her own Clothesline School of Writing. She taught idiosyncratically, throwing pencils, advising her students on diet and lifestyle, and encouraging them to get "all the autobiographical stuff out-and out of the way". Daniels also compiled a book of writing lessons and exercises, The Clothesline Review Manual for Writers (1987).

Towards the end of her life, Daniels lived in an ecovillage in Ithaca, New York. She profiled several ecovillage residents for The Epoch Times, and in 2011 these profiles were collected into a volume Under a Green Shade: Epoch Times Biographies.

== Personal life ==
Daniels married fellow Fulbright scholar A. K. Ramanujan in 1962, and the two divorced nine years later. Daniels and Ramanujan married again in 1974 and divorced again in 1988. The couple had two children, Krishna Ramanujan and Krittika Ramanujan. Daniels died on 26 November 2015.

== Works ==
=== Fiction ===
- Haladi Meenu (Kannada translation of the unpublished Yellow Fish), 1966
- The Salt Doll, 1978
- A City of Children and Other Stories, 1986

=== Non-fiction ===
- G. V. Desani: Writer and Worldview, 1984
- The Clothesline Review Manual for Writers, 1987
- The Prophetic Novel, 1991
- Under a Green Shade: Epoch Times Biographies, 2011

=== As Editor ===
- Uncollected Poems and Prose, by A. K. Ramanujan, edited by Molly Daniels and Keith Harrison, 2001
