= Vidya Bharati =

Indian chain of private schools

- India

Information
- Type: Educational institution
- Motto: Sa Vidya Ya Vimuktaye (That Is Knowledge Which Liberates)
- Established: 1977; 49 years ago
- Status: Active
- Publication: Vidya Bharati Sanskriti Shiksha Sansthan, Kurukshetra; Bharatiya Shiksha Sodh Sansthan, Lucknow
- Affiliations: Sangh Parivar
- Website: vidyabharti.net

Vidya Bharati (short for Vidya Bharati Akhil Bharatiya Shiksha Sansthan) is the educational wing of Rashtriya Swayamsevak Sangh (RSS). It runs one of the largest private networks of schools in India, operating 8000 schools with over 3 million students as of 2025, and has its registered headquarters in Lucknow with a functional headquarters in Delhi and a sub-office in Kurukshetra. In the year 2020, the million lives club selected Vidya Bharati as an official member of Vanguard cohort for its contribution to school education.

== History ==
RSS, under the tutelage of M. S. Golwalkar established its first Gita school at Kurukshetra in 1946. But, the ban on RSS in 1948 put a damper on the spread of the Gita school model. After the ban was lifted, the first Saraswati Shishu Mandir brand school was established in Gorakhpur in 1952, by Nanaji Deshmukh.

The Saraswati Shishu Mandir model was quickly replicated across several locations and as the number of schools increased, there arose the need of a definite management structure. Accordingly, Shishu Shiksha Prabandak Samiti, was set up to coordinate activities between these schools at the state level. Such committees were set up in Delhi, Bihar, Madhya Pradesh and Andhra Pradesh.

In 1977-78, an all-India apex body, Vidya Bharati was set up to coordinate the activities between these state committees and was headquartered in Delhi. This coincided with the Bharatiya Jan Sangh (political arm of RSS) winning the national elections, as a member of the Janata Party. Incidentally, Vidya Bharati used to have an associated National Academic Council with educationists, which enjoyed the trust of the National Council of Educational Research and Training (NCERT).

== Organisation ==
=== Leadership ===
The all-India apex body of Vidya Bharati is headed by a National President and a Patron. As of recent elections, Shri Ravindra Kanhere serves as the National President, with Shri Brahmadeo Sharma (Bhai Ji) as Patron. It also has several Vice-Presidents and other national officers who oversee its vast network.

=== Growth and scale ===
By the early 1990s, the network had grown to 5,000 schools and by 2003, to about 14,000 schools with 17 lakh (1.7 million) pupils. This expansion was facilitated by the growing demand for education in India and the disaffection with the state school system. As of March 2002, it had 17,396 schools, 22 lakh (2.2 million) students, over 93,000 teachers, 15 teacher training colleges, 12 degree colleges, and 7 vocational and training institutions. As of 2019, there were 12,828 formal schools and 11,353 informal schools. In 2019, the formal schools had a total strength of more than 34 lakh (3.4 million) students.

Most of the Vidya Bharati schools are affiliated with the Central Board for Secondary Education or their local State Boards. Vidya Bharati-run educational programs were adopted in Madhya Pradesh as an alternate model of education when BJP was in power.

In addition to formal schools (which go by a variety of names such as Adarsh Vidhya Mandir, Shishu Vatika, Saraswati Shishu Mandir, Saraswati Vidya Mandir, Saraswati Vidyalaya etc.), Vidya Bharati also runs sanskar kendras (cultural schools) and single-teacher schools for cultural education. It operates numerous higher education institutions, including teacher training colleges and degree colleges.

=== Presence ===
It has schools in remote areas of the north-eastern states as well as states like Kerala and Tamil Nadu where RSS does not have much influence. Particular attention is given to underdeveloped regions and regions inhabited by tribal communities. The Vidya Bharati schools are spread all over the country ranging from rural to urban areas from western ghats to northeast parts of India. Shankardev Shishu Niketan which is a cluster of schools run under Vidya Bharati in northeast India has produced some of the young minds coming from minority communities who topped grade 10 and won several Sanskrit essay writing competitions. The chain has over 29 state and regional committees affiliated with it, making it the largest voluntary association in India. Students in schools run by Vidya Bharati come from all religious groups. For instance, in Uttar Pradesh, more than 12,000 Muslim and Christian students study in these schools.

=== Funding and patronage ===
Funds for the expansion were collected through various means, including charitable contributions from individuals and organizations worldwide. The Institution is entirely privately funded and does not receive financial assistance from government sources. This funding model enables it to operate independently while supporting its educational and research activities.

Nanaji Deshmukh believed that the movement had turned 'materialistic', during the later phases but was not paying enough attention to recruiting high-quality teachers. The schools attract the children of urban and small-town shopkeepers and those of professional and government official families.

== Ideology and objectives ==
Dinanath Batra, former General Secretary of Vidya Bharati, said that they were fighting an "ideological battle against Macaulay, Marx, and Madrasawadis". In comparison to which Vidya Bharati advocates "Indianisation, nationalisation and spiritualisation" of education. In the areas of study that are peripheral to the core curriculum, like physical education, music, and cultural education, the institution worked out its curriculum.

== Cultural education ==
In addition to the prescribed curriculum, the Vidya Bharati schools teach five extra subjects: moral education, which includes stories of heroes, songs, honesty, and personal hygiene, physical education, which includes learning to wield a stick, martial arts and yoga, music, Sanskrit and Vedic mathematics. Girls are given kanya bharati sessions where they discuss real-world problems, especially "women-centric" issues, and learn how to deal with them. They are trained to become strong leaders idolizing Jhansi Rani Lakshmibai, Ahilyabai Holkar, Rudramadevi, and other successful women in various fields like Kalpana Chawla, Kiran Bedi, Indra Nooyi etc.

In the morning assembly, the children are taught to pray and sing songs steeped in Sanskrit and the spirit of patriotism. Assemblies and stage performances organized at Hindu festivals also serve to convey the Deshbhakti ideology. The virtual absence of non-Hindu children in the schools leads to a collective sense of Hindu identity. In the words of a Vidya Bharati commentator "dedication to the motherland with a deep Bharatiya spirit inculcates in the child the will to change his character [and] adjust his nature and program to fulfill the nation's will and necessity."

The schools also function as conduits for spreading the RSS concept of education, aiming to foster "Vyakti Nirman" (personality development) and patriotic fervor rooted in Hindu culture.

== National Education Policy 2020 ==
Vidya Bharati actively contributed to the formulation of the National Education Policy 2020 (NEP 2020). The organization asserts that many of its recommendations, particularly those emphasizing a "Bharat-centric approach" and early childhood play-based learning (similar to its Shishu Vatika model), were incorporated into the final policy. Following the policy's release, Vidya Bharati began upskilling thousands of its master trainers and teachers to align with the new framework, and its educational experts participated in NCERT focus groups for preparing the National Curriculum Framework.

== Controversies ==
In 2001, the state government of Goa faced severe criticism from educationists and opposition parties when it decided to transfer the management of 51 government primary schools to Vidya Bharati. There have also been isolated reports of protests against specific Vidya Bharati schools for imposing strict dress codes, enforcing RSS ideology, and allegedly banning regional languages like Punjabi. The curriculum taught in schools affiliated with Vidya Bharati has been a consistent source of controversy, with scholars and journalists documenting accusations of historical and educational revisionism. Critics argue that the curriculum is designed to instill a specific Hindutva ideology in students at the expense of historical accuracy and inclusivity.

There are concerns regarding the portrayal of history in Vidya Bharati textbooks, which have been accused of employing anti-Muslim rhetoric and promoting cultural indoctrination. Specific examples cited involve the reinterpretation of historical figures like Chhatrapati Shivaji, portraying his strategies explicitly as "war wisdom" rather than deceit, and advocating for the view that the Indo-Aryans were indigenous to the Indian subcontinent rather than immigrants. Furthermore, Vidya Bharati has exerted influence on state education departments, recommending significant reforms in the curriculum of government-run secondary schools to align them with their ideological perspective.

== State level committee ==
The state-level affiliate committees of Vidya Bharati go by various names, depending on the socio-political situation in each state:

- Delhi: Hindu Shiksha Samiti
- Haryana: Hindu Shiksha Samiti
- Punjab: Sarv Hitkari Shiksha Samiti
- Bihar: Lok Shiksha Samiti, Bharati Shiksha Samiti
- Jammu: Bharatiya Shiksha Samiti
- Jharkhand: Vananchal Shiksha Samiti, Vidya Vikas Samiti, Shishu Shiksha Vikas Samiti
- Odisha: Shiksha Vikas Samiti
- Telangana and Andhra Pradesh: Sri Saraswati Vidya Peetham
- Tamil Nadu: Vivekananda Kendra and others
- Kerala: Bharatiya Vidya Niketan
- Assam: Shishu Shiksha Samiti
- Uttrakhand : Bharatiya Shiksha Samiti
- Uttar Pradesh: Bharatiya Shiksha Samiti
- West Bengal: Vivekananda Vidyavikash Parishad

== Notable alumni ==
- Nishad Kumar — Paralympic athlete and high jump silver medalist

== See also ==
- Akhara
- Akshaya Patra Foundation
- Education in India
- Ekal Vidyalaya
- Gurukula
- History of education in the Indian subcontinent
- Rashtriya Swayamsevak Sangh
- Swami Lakshamanananda
- Vanavasi Kalyan Ashram

== Other sources ==
- Panikkar, K. N. (1999). "Secular and democratic education". Social Scientist. 27 (9/10): 70–75. doi:10.2307/3518105. JSTOR 3518105.
- Sharma, R. (2002). Indian Education at the Crossroads. Delhi: Shubhi Publications. ISBN 978-8187226635.
- Sarkar, Tanika (1994). "Educating the children of the Hindu Rashtra: Notes on RSS schools". Comparative Studies of South Asia. Vol. 14, no. 2. pp. 10–15.
