= Thillenkeri =

Thillenkeri Thillankeri
- Town
- Location in Kerala, India Thillenkeri (India)
- Coordinates: 11°57′0″N 75°37′0″E
- Country: India
- State: Kerala
- District: Kannur

Government
  - Type: Panchayati raj (India)
  - Body: Thillenkeri Grama Panchayat

Area
  - Total: 25.06 km^{2} (9.68 sq mi)

Population (2011)
  - Total: 14,583
  - Density: 581.9/km^{2} (1,507/sq mi)

Languages
  - Official: Malayalam, English
- Time zone: UTC+5:30 (IST)
- PIN: 670702
- ISO 3166 code: IN-KL

Thillenkeri is a small town and Grama Panchayat in Iritty taluk of Kannur district in the Indian state of Kerala.

== Demographics ==
As of 2011 Census, Thillenkeri had a population of 14,583 of which 6,967 are males and 7,616 are females. Thillenkeri village spreads over 25.06 km^{2} (9.68 sq mi) area with 3,204 families residing in it. The sex ratio of Thillenkeri was 1,093 higher than state average of 1,084. Population of children in the age group 0-6 was 1,653 (11.3%) which constitutes 838 males and 815 females. Thillenkeri had overall literacy of 92.8% lower than state average of 94%. The male literacy stands at 96.4% and female literacy was 89.5%.

== Transportation ==
The national highway passes through Kannur town. Goa and Mumbai can be accessed on the northern side and Cochin and Thiruvananthapuram can be accessed on the southern side. The road to the east of Iritty connects to Mysore and Bangalore. The nearest railway station is Kannur on Mangalore-Palakkad line. Trains are available to almost all parts of India subject to advance booking over the internet. There are airports at Mattanur, Mangalore and Calicut. All of them are international airports but direct flights are available only to Middle Eastern countries.
