= Three Hundred Ramayanas: Five Examples and Three Thoughts on Translation =

1987 essay by A. K. Ramanujan

"Three Hundred Rāmāyaṇas: Five Examples and Three Thoughts on Translation" is an essay written by Indian writer A. K. Ramanujan for a Conference on Comparison of Civilizations at the University of Pittsburgh, February 1987.

The essay was a required reading on Delhi University's syllabus for history undergraduates from 2006–7 onward. On October 9, 2011, the Academic Council of the University decided to remove the essay from the BA curriculum for its next academic cycle. This action of the Academic Council attracted a lot of attention and several people viewed this as an act of unwarranted censorship.

== Ramanujan's thesis ==
Three Hundred Rāmāyaṇas is a scholarly essay that summarizes the history of the Rāmāyaṇa and its spread across India and Asia over a period of 2,500 years or more. It seeks to demonstrate factually how the story of Rama has undergone numerous variations while being transmitted across different languages, societies, geographical regions, religions, and historical periods. It does not seek to document all the recorded tellings and re-tellings of the Rāmāyaṇa. Instead, it focuses on only five specific tellings of the Rāmāyaṇa from different languages, regions, cultures, and periods, which serve purely as indicators of a much larger range of actual variations.

The count of 300 Ramayanas in the title of the essay is based on a work of Camille Bulcke and it has been pointed out that it is an underestimate of the actual count. However, Ramanujan considers only five tellings of Ramayana, namely, the tellings by Valmiki, Kamban, the Jain telling, the Thai Ramakien and the South Indian folk tellings. Ramanujan specifically prefers the term "tellings" to the usual terms "versions" and "variants" because the latter terms can and do imply the existence of an invariant original text. One of Ramanujan's main observations in the essay is that there is no such original Ramayana and that Valmiki's Ramayana telling is only one among many Ramayana tellings.

== Publication history ==
1. A. K. Ramanujan, ‘Three Hundred Rāmāyaṇas: Five Examples and Three Thoughts on Translation’, in Many Rāmāyaṇas: The Diversity of a Narrative Tradition in South Asia, ed. by Paula Richman (Berkeley: University of California Press, 1991), pp. 22–48. ISBN 9780520075894. Available at http://ark.cdlib.org/ark:/13030/ft3j49n8h7/.
2. A. K. Ramanujan, ‘Three Hundred Rāmāyaṇas: Five Examples and Three Thoughts on Translation’, in The Collected Essays of A. K. Ramanujan (Oxford: Oxford University Press, 2004), pp. 131–60, available here.
