= Kuderu Rajagopal =

Indian educator

Kuderu Rajagopal is an Indian educator. He served as Vice-Chancellor of Sri Krishnadevaraya University, Anantapuramu.

== Early life ==
He was born on 2 February 1953 and brought up in Anantapur, Andhra Pradesh. He did his Bachelor of Technology in Mechanical Engineering in 1976 and Master of Technology in Heat Power in 1978 at Jawaharlal Nehru Technological University, Anantapur. He earned his Ph.D. in mechanical engineering at Indian Institute of Technology Madras in 1991.

== Career ==
He started his career as a lecturer in 1978, working at Siddaganga Institute of Technology, Tumkur for two years and at Chaitanya Bharathi Inst. of Technology, Hyderabad for a year. He joined JNTU College of Engineering, Anantapur in 1981. He has been a Vice-Principal, Principal and Vice-Chancellor. He has received about 15 awards from various professional bodies.

He worked as Vice-Chancellor for the Jawaharlal Nehru Technological University, Hyderabad, of the combined states of Andhra Pradesh and Telangana. He served as Vice-Chancellor of various other universities viz., Osmania University- Hyderabad, Potti Sreeramulu Telugu University-Hyderabad, Sri Venkateswara University-Tirupathi, Yogi Vemana University-Kadapa, and Jawaharlal Nehru Technological University, Anantapur. He was also South Central Regional Committee Chairman of All India Council for Technical Education (AICTE)

== Research ==
He published 335 scholarly articles at the national and international level. He guided about 35 research scholars in obtaining their doctoral degree and 70 students working towards their Master of Technology.

== Member of Professional Bodies ==
- Member of THE COMBUSTION INSTITUTE- INDIAN SECTION (CIIS) (S.No. 275, LMC-664)

== Awards received ==
- Awarded ‘Best Teacher’ for the year 2004 by the Govt. of A.P.
- Swami Vivekananda Award by Indian Institute of Oriental Heritage, Kolkata
- Excellent Administrator award by Indian American Friendship Council (IAFC) Texas State Chapter, USA, April 2007
- ISTE Honorary Fellowship Award Feb 2017
