= Yuvaraja's College, Mysore =

College in Mysore, Karnataka

Coordinates: 12.3061°N 76.6411°E

Yuvaraja's College, Mysuru
- Type: Public
- Established: 1928; 98 years ago
- Affiliations: UGC
- Academic affiliations: University of Mysore
- Principal: S. Mahadeva Murthy
- Location: Mysore, Karnataka, India
- Campus: Urban
- Website: ycm.uni-mysore.ac.in

Yuvaraja's College, Mysuru, is a general degree college (Autonomous) located at Mysuru, Karnataka. It was established in the year 1928. It is one of the four constituent colleges of University of Mysore. This college offers different undergraduate and postgraduate courses in science.

== Departments ==
=== Science ===
Biochemistry, Biotechnology, Botany, Management Sciences, Chemistry, Computer Science, Electronics, Environmental Science, Food Science and Nutrition, Geology, Mathematics, Microbiology, Molecular Biology, Physics, Sericulture, Statistics, Zoology.

=== Languages ===
Kannada, English, Hindi, Urdu, Sanskrit, Persian.

== Accreditation ==
The college is recognized by the University Grants Commission (UGC).
