= Janadesh 2007 =

350km foot march for land rights

Janadesh is the name of an abandoned national campaign on land rights in India. The word "Janadesh" means "The Decree of the People" in Hindi. The campaign was launched in 2005 and culminated in 2007, in the form of a 350 km foot march allegedly involving 25,000 people.

== Rural poverty in India ==
According to a recent World Bank report, poverty remains a significant problem in India, with progress described as 'modest' compared to some Asian neighbors. Poverty is most widespread in rural areas, affecting almost three out of four Indians, with the highest incidence among the rural landless, 68% of whom live below the poverty line.

A 2003 study by Sundaram and Tendulkar supports these findings, indicating the highest poverty levels among assetless (landless) rural households reliant on agricultural wage labor, with greater severity among Scheduled Tribe or Scheduled Caste members. Despite a percentage decrease in rural poverty, population growth means the absolute number of people below the poverty line is not decreasing.

There are differing views on alleviating poverty among these groups with suggestions for granting secure land rights to landless peasants to reduce dependence on casual wage labor and provide food security. Research by Hanstad, Brown, and Prosterman in Karnataka and West Bengal supports this, showing that small land plots (0.05-0.15 acres) significantly benefit landless families at low costs, increasing income, access to credit, and social status. They estimate the cost of such a program for the ten million poorest families in India at approximately 3,330 million rupees over ten years. By contrast, the central government's rural housing scheme has cost 15,360 million rupees annually over the past five years, yet has produced low-quality housing according to participants. Hanstad, Brown, and Prosterman also cite global studies showing similar results.

== Current state of land reform in India ==
Campaigns across eight Indian states have shown that even having a land entitlement often does not lead to actual possession of land, with around 50% of cases failing to secure land.

Several factors contribute to this issue. Firstly, outdated land records in India hinder land ownership. While the Indian government is working to computerize these records, the Asian Development Bank emphasizes the need to correct records first. It is commonly observed that land records often list deceased individuals or those who do not possess the land.

Secondly, a recent PACS discussion paper highlights that even updated land records do not ensure security of possession. Dispossessed individuals must go to court to establish their title, a process easily prolonged by wealthier opponents. This system favors the wealthy, offering little protection against land grabs, which can range from violent expulsion to bribery of officials. According to R Srivastava, the wealthy landowners often resist giving land to the landless to maintain their autonomy and wage control, and they hold significant influence over local politicians and administrators.

Lastly, the national government holds significant power to acquire land through the 'Land Acquisition Act' of 1984, which allows land acquisition in the 'public interest', a term not clearly defined, giving the government broad authority.

These factors create a system of land ownership with little security for the rural poor.

== Objectives of Janadesh 2007 ==
Based on their view of current land legislation, many activists argue that only through national-level legislative action can lasting change be achieved. While state-level campaigns have had some success in distributing land to the landless, significant changes are needed at the national level to ensure the protection of land rights for the poor and their actual benefit from the land.

The Janadesh campaign is a means of connecting various local campaigns into a single national effort large enough to pressure the government into action. Janadesh 2007 will culminate in a foot march by 25,000 people, mainly landless Adivasis and Dalits, from Gwalior to Delhi along the main highway, covering about 350 km. The march, set to start on October 2, 2007, and arrive in Delhi on October 28, 2007, will be an act of mass non-violent civil disobedience in the tradition of Gandhi. According to organizers, it will be the largest such action since the struggle for Indian independence.

The campaign demands three key reforms in land policy: the establishment of a National Land Authority to clarify land utilization and strengthen pro-poor laws, the creation of fast track courts to resolve land conflicts, and the development of a single window system to help farmers address land issues efficiently.

These measures aim to create a system of land ownership that truly benefits the rural poor and protects their rights.

== Gallery ==
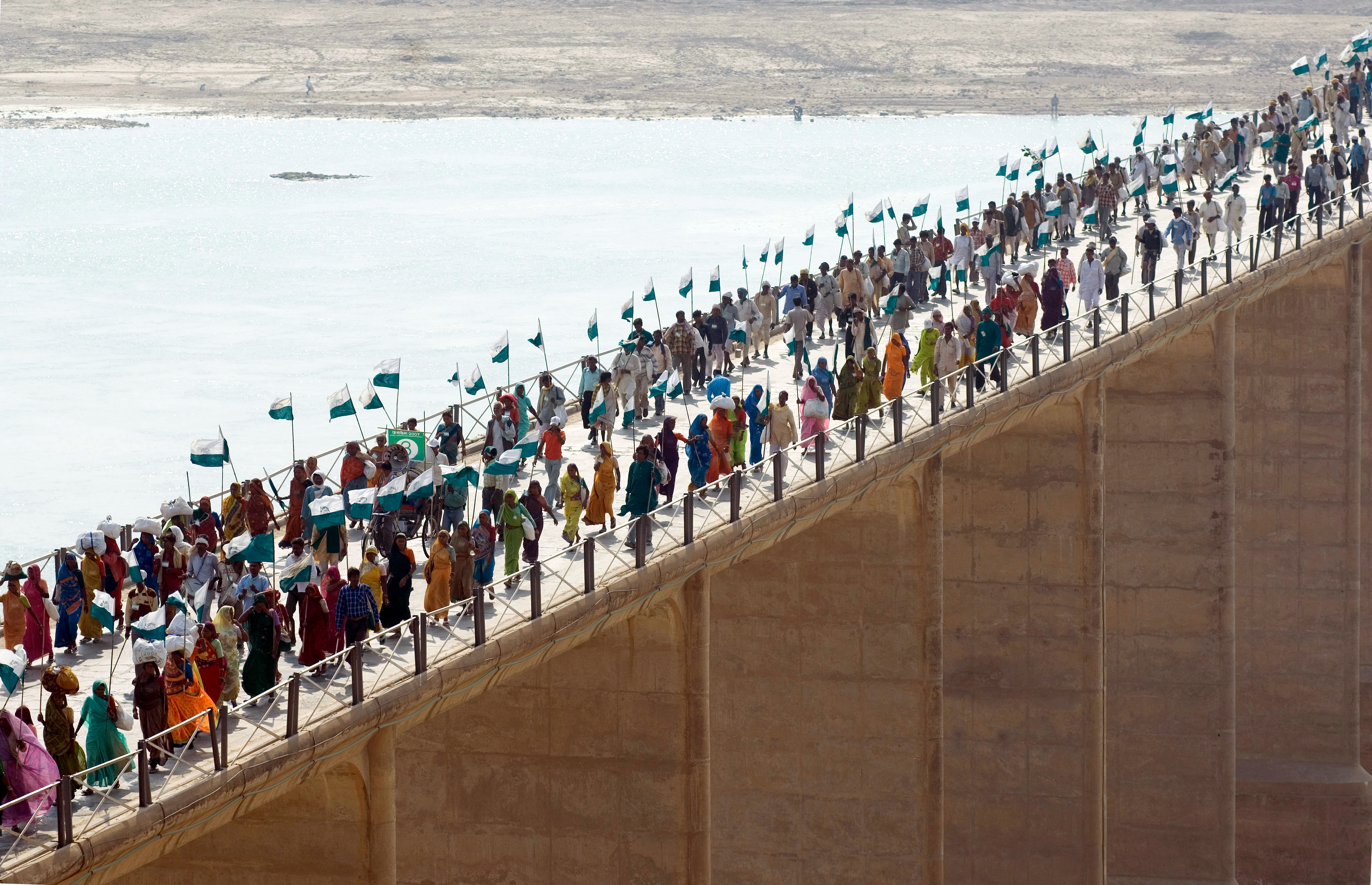
Janadesh 2007 on Chambal bridge

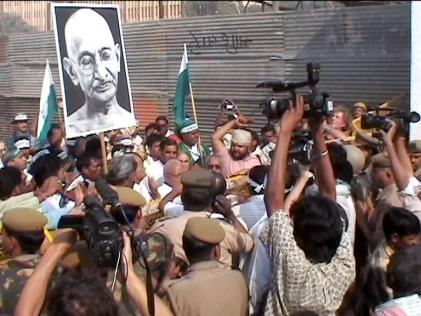
New Delhi's struggle facing the medias.
