= A. K. Ramanujan =

Indian linguist

- Born: Attipate Krishnaswami Ramanujan; 16 March 1929; Mysore, Kingdom of Mysore, British India
- Died: 13 July 1993 (aged 64); Chicago, Illinois, U.S.
- Spouse: Molly Daniels
- Awards: MacArthur Fellowship, Sahitya Akademi Award and Padma Shree

Academic background
- Education: University of Mysore; Indiana University Bloomington
- Thesis: A Generative Grammar Of Kannada (1963)

Academic work
- Discipline: Dravidian linguistics and Indian literature; English poetry
- Institutions: University of Chicago
- Notable works: The Striders (1966); Second Sight

Attipate Krishnaswami Ramanujan (16 March 1929 – 13 July 1993) was an Indian poet and scholar of Indian literature and linguistics. Ramanujan was also a professor of linguistics at University of Chicago.

Also described as a philologist, folklorist, translator, and playwright, Ramanujan's academic research ranged across five languages: Kannada, English, Tamil, Telugu and Sanskrit. He published works on both classical and modern variants, arguingly strongly for giving local, non-standard dialects their due. Ramanujan's poems are remembered as enigmatic works of startling originality, sophistication and moving artistry, and he was awarded the Sahitya Academy Award posthumously in 1999 for The Collected Poems.

== Early life and education ==
Ramanujan was born in Mysore City (now Karnataka) on 16 March 1929. His father, Attipat Asuri Krishnaswami, an astrologer and professor of mathematics at Mysore University, was known for his interest in English, Kannada and Sanskrit languages. His mother was a homemaker.

Ramanujan was educated at Marimallappa's High School, Mysore, and at the Maharaja College of Mysore. In college, Ramanujan majored in science in his freshman year, but his father persuaded him to change his major from science to English. Later, Ramanujan became a Fellow of Deccan College, Pune in 1958–59 and a Fulbright Scholar at Indiana University Bloomington in 1959–62. He was educated in English at the University of Mysore and received his PhD in linguistics from Indiana University Bloomington.

== Career ==
Ramanujan worked as a lecturer of English at Quilon and Belgaum; he later taught at The Maharaja Sayajirao University in Baroda for about eight years. In 1962, he joined the University of Chicago as an assistant professor. He was affiliated with the university throughout his career, teaching in several departments. He taught at other universities in the United States as well, including Harvard University, University of Wisconsin, University of Michigan, University of California at Berkeley, and Carleton College. At the University of Chicago, Ramanujan was instrumental in shaping the South Asian Studies program. He worked in the departments of South Asian Languages and Civilizations, Linguistics, and with the Committee on Social Thought.

In 1976, the Government of India awarded him the Padma Shri, and in 1983, he was given the MacArthur Prize Fellowship and appointed the William E. Colvin Professor on the Departments of South Asian Languages and Civilizations, Linguistics, and the Committee on Social Thought at the University of Chicago. As an Indo-American writer, Ramanujan had the experience of the native as well as foreign milieu. His poems such as the "Conventions of Despair" reflected his views on the cultures and conventions of the east and west.

A. K. Ramanujan died in Chicago on 13 July 1993 as result of an adverse reaction to anaesthesia during preparation for surgery.

== Contributions to Indian studies ==
A. K. Ramanujan's theoretical and aesthetic contributions span several disciplinary areas. In his cultural essays such as "Is There an Indian Way of Thinking?" (1990), he explains cultural ideologies and behavioral manifestations thereof in terms of an Indian psychology he calls "context-sensitive" thinking. In his work in folklore studies, Ramanujan highlights the inter-textuality of the Indian oral and written literary tradition. His essay "Where Mirrors Are Windows: Toward an Anthology of Reflections" (1989), and his commentaries in The Interior Landscape: Love Poems from a Classical Tamil Anthology (1967) and Folktales from India, Oral Tales from Twenty Indian Languages (1991) are good examples of his work in Indian folklore studies.

Additionally, his work Speaking of Śiva, a literary study in the early 1970s, was very influential in shaping the understanding of the contemporary understanding of Vīraśaivas, Śaiva devotees of the Kannada-speaking region. "Speaking of Śiva became the unrivaled standard for introducing the Vīraśaivas, South Asian devotionalism, and even Hinduism more broadly to a variety of English-speaking audiences worldwide."

== Ramayana essay and controversy ==
In 1991, Ramanujan published "Three Hundred Ramayanas: Five Examples and Three Thoughts on Translation" in an edited scholarly volumed titled Many Ramayanas. The volume was lauded as "visionary scholarship" that "permanently shaped the field," and Ramanujan's essay became much read and cited.

In 2006, the Akhil Bharatiya Vidyarthi Parishad (ABVP), a Hindu nationalist student group, objected to the essay's inclusion in the B.A. in History syllabus of the University of Delhi. They were displeased that Ramanujan acknowledged the existence of many versions of the Ramayana, including versions that portrayed Rama and Sita as siblings, which contradicts versions by Valmiki and Tulsidas that are more commonly known among North Indians . The ABVP committed acts of vandalism and violence to press their case for the essay's removal from the syllabus.

In 2008, Delhi University convened a four-person committee to decide on the essay's inclusion with the approval of the Delhi High Court. The committee unanimously supported the essay, with a single member noting that it might upset people. Delhi University's academic council, however, ignored the committee's recommendation and voted to scrap the essay from its syllabus in October 2011. This led to protests by many historians and intellectuals, accusing Delhi University of violating academic freedom to placate violent extremists. Ramanujan's essay continues to be widely taught, read, and cited outside of India.

== Selected publications ==
His works include translations from Old Tamil and Old Kannada, such as:

Translations and Studies of Literature

- The Interior Landscape: Love Poems from a Classical Tamil Anthology, 1967
- Song of the Earth, Writers Workshop. 1968.
- Speaking of Siva, Penguin. 1973. ISBN 9780140442700.
- The Literatures of India. Edited with Edwin Gerow. Chicago: University of Chicago Press, 1974
- Hymns for the Drowning, 1981
- Poems of Love and War. New York: Columbia University Press, 1985
- Folktales from India, Oral Tales from Twenty Indian Languages, 1991
- Is There an Indian Way of Thinking? in India Through Hindu Categories, edited by McKim Marriott, 1990
- When God Is a Customer: Telugu Courtesan Songs by Ksetrayya and Others (with Velcheru Narayana Rao and David Shulman), 1994
- A Flowering Tree and Other Oral Tales from India, 1997

Essays

- Three Hundred Ramayanas: Five Examples and Three Thoughts on Translation
- Collected Essays of A. K. Ramanujan
- "A Flowering Tree: A Women's Tale". In: Syllables of Sky: Studies in South Indian Civilization. Oxford University Press, 1995. pages 20–42. ISBN 9780195635492. (posthumous article)

Poetry

- The Striders. London: Oxford University Press, 1966
- Relations. London, New York: Oxford University Press, 1971
- Selected Poems. New Delhi: Oxford University Press, 1976
- Second Sight. New York: Oxford University Press,1986
- The Collected Poems. New Delhi: Oxford University Press, 1995

Appearances in the following poetry Anthologies

- Ten Twentieth-Century Indian Poets (1976) ed. by R. Parthasarathy and published by Oxford University Press, New Delhi
- The Oxford India Anthology of Twelve Modern Indian Poets (1992) ed. by Arvind Krishna Mehrotra and published by Oxford University Press, New Delhi
- The Golden Treasure of Writers Workshop Poetry (2008) ed. by Rubana Huq and published by Writers Workshop, Calcutta

Kannada

- Samskara. (translation of U R Ananthamurthy's Kannada novel) Delhi: Oxford University Press, 1976
- Hokkulalli Huvilla (translated to English - "No Flower in the Navel"). Dharwad, 1969
- Mattu Itara Padyagalu (translated to English - "And Other Poems"). Dharwad, 1977
- Kuntobille (translated to English - "Hopscotch")
- Mattobbana Atma Charitre (translated to English - "Yet Another Man's Autobiography")
- Haladi Meenu (Kannada Translation of Shouri's English Novel)
- A. K. Ramanujan Samagra (Complete Works of A. K. Ramanujan in Kannada)
- A. K. Ramanujan Avara Aayda Kavitegalu
- A. K. Ramanujan Avara Aayda Barahagalu
- "In the kingdom of fools" (9th class English, supplementary)

== See also ==
- List of translators into English
