= Perumannu =

- village
- Location in Kerala, India
- Coordinates: 11.98472°N 75.58075°E
- Country: India
- State: Kerala
- District: Kannur

Government
  - Body: Padiyoor-Kalliad Grama Panchayat

Languages
  - Official: Malayalam, English
- Time zone: UTC+5:30 (IST)
- PIN: 670593
- ISO 3166 code: IN-KL
- Vehicle registration: KL-78
- Nearest Town: Irikkur (2.8 km)
- Sex ratio: Mattanur
- Lok Sabha constituency: Kannur

Perumannu is a village in Padiyoor-Kalliad panchayat in Kannur district of Kerala, India. It is located on State Highway 36 near Irikkur on the way towards Iritty.

== Incidents ==
On 4 December 2008, ten school children were killed and twelve injured in a road accident at Perumannu, when a Jeep hit the children as they were on their way home from school. One of the injured victims died a few days later, raising the death toll to 10 children. And the driver gets ten years of imprisonment and Rs.1 lakh fine for rash driving by the Thalassery additional district court.

== Transportation ==
The national highway passes through Taliparamba town. Mangalore and Mumbai can be accessed on the northern side and Cochin and Thiruvananthapuram can be accessed on the southern side. The road to the east connects to Mysore and Bangalore. The nearest railway station is Kannur on Mangalore-Palakkad line. There are airports at Mangalore and Calicut.
