= Transport in Kannur district =

Kannur has a good road network connecting to Bangalore, Mangalore, Kodagu, Kozhikode and Cochin. The railway station is also well connected to all parts of India. There is new International airport from Kannur opened on 9 December 2018, other nearest airports are at Calicut and Mangalore. Thalassery, Payyanur, Taliparamba and Iritty are the other transport hubs.

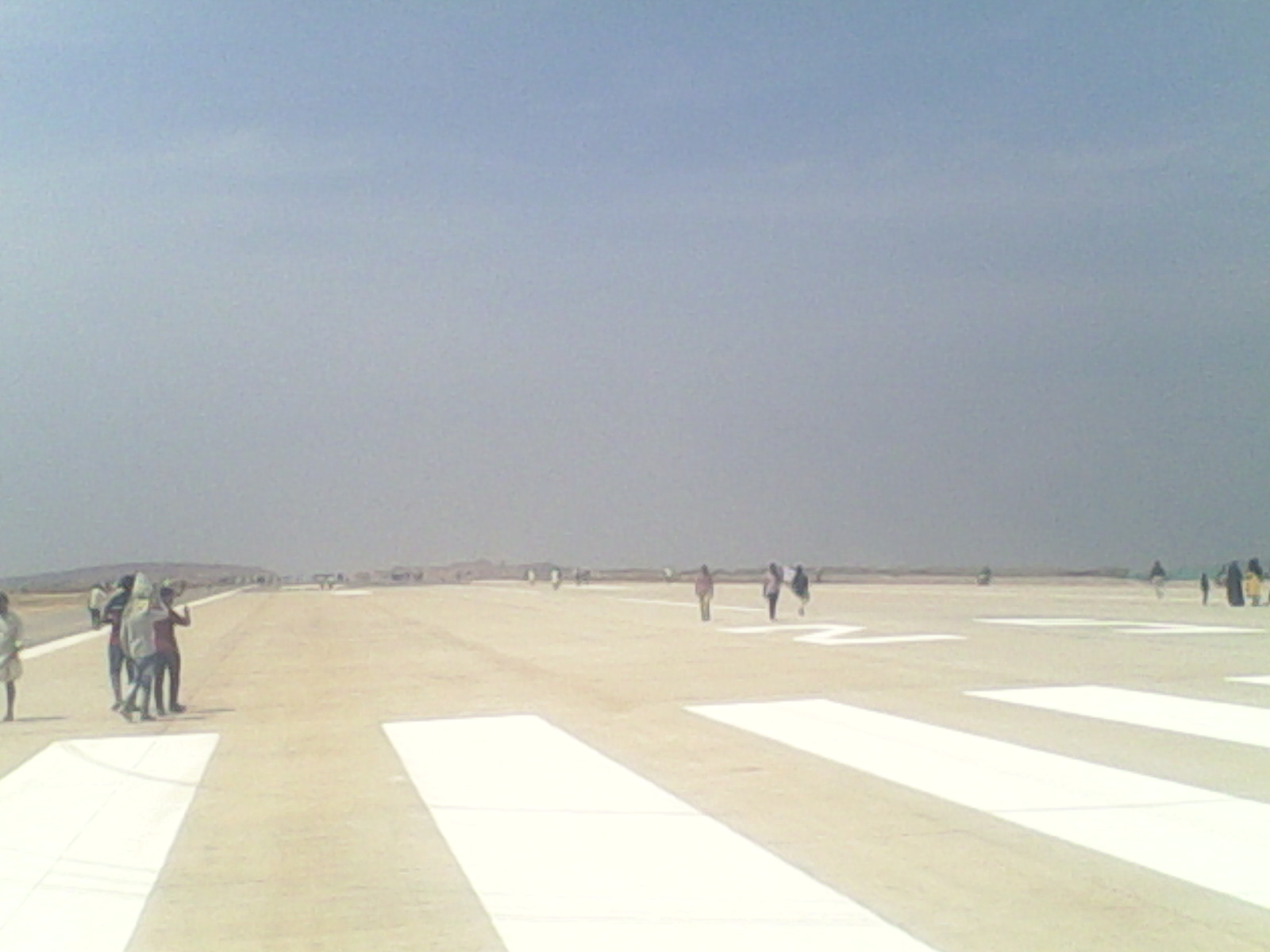
Kannur Airport

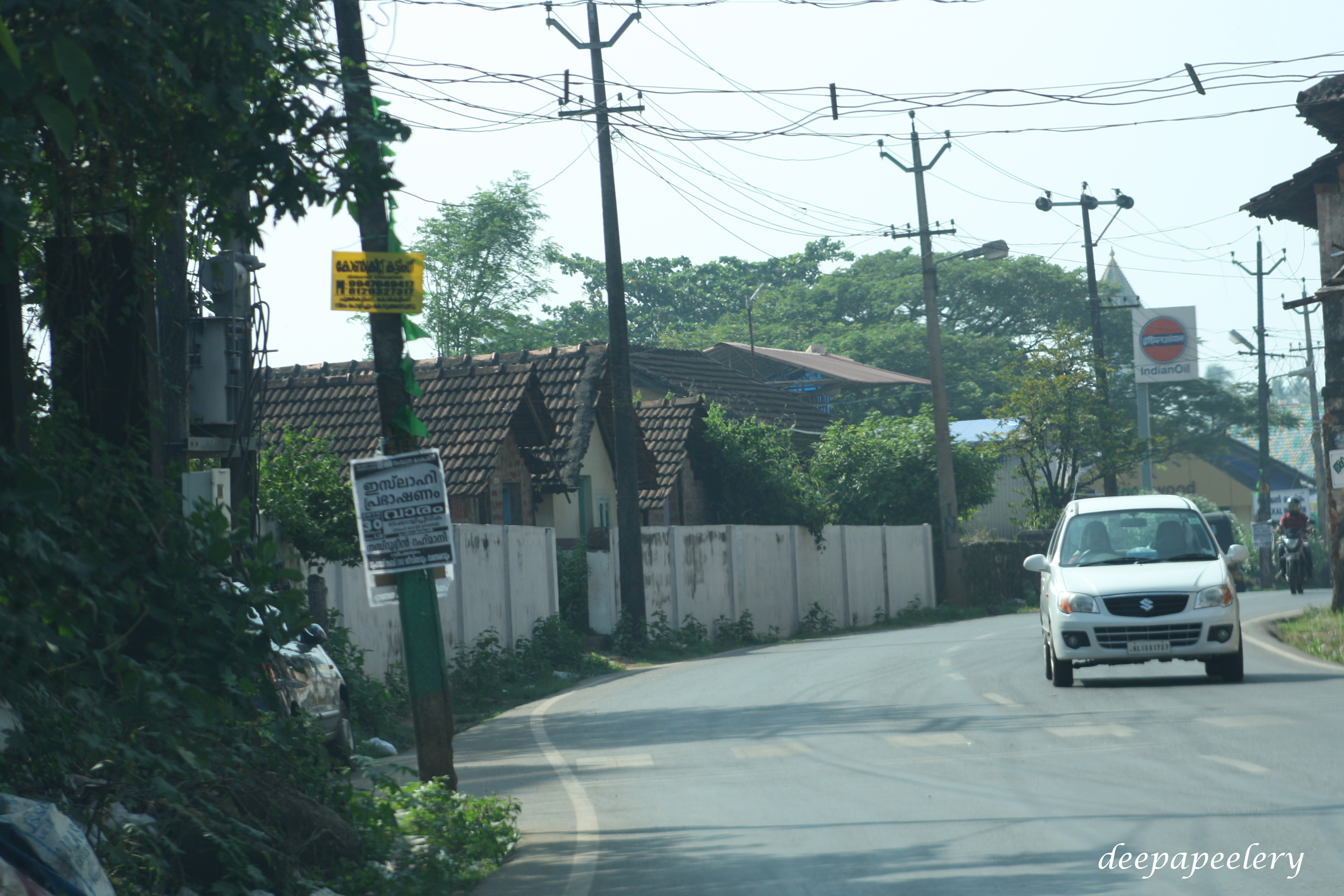
Heritage road at Ayikkara beach

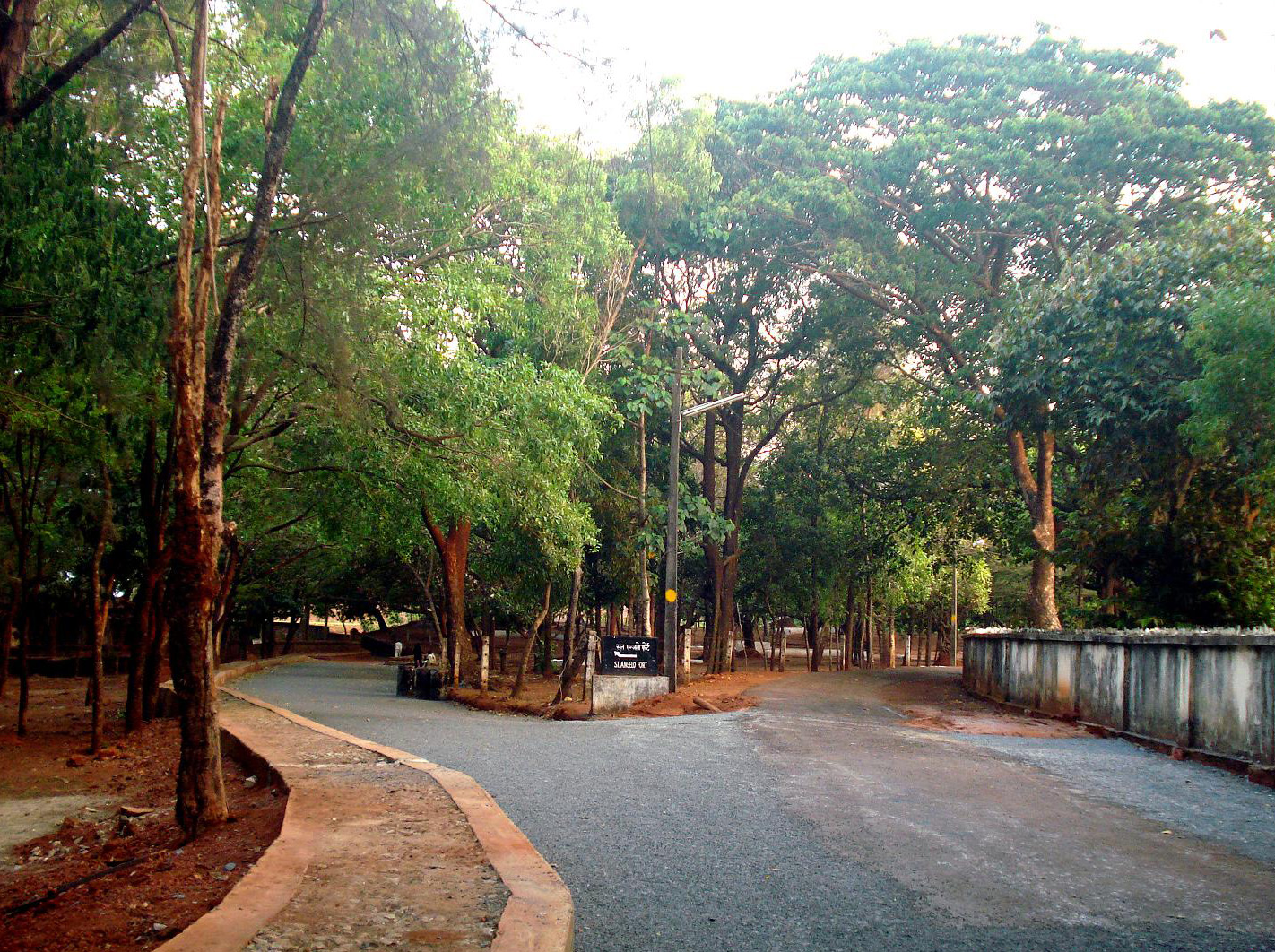
Fort Road

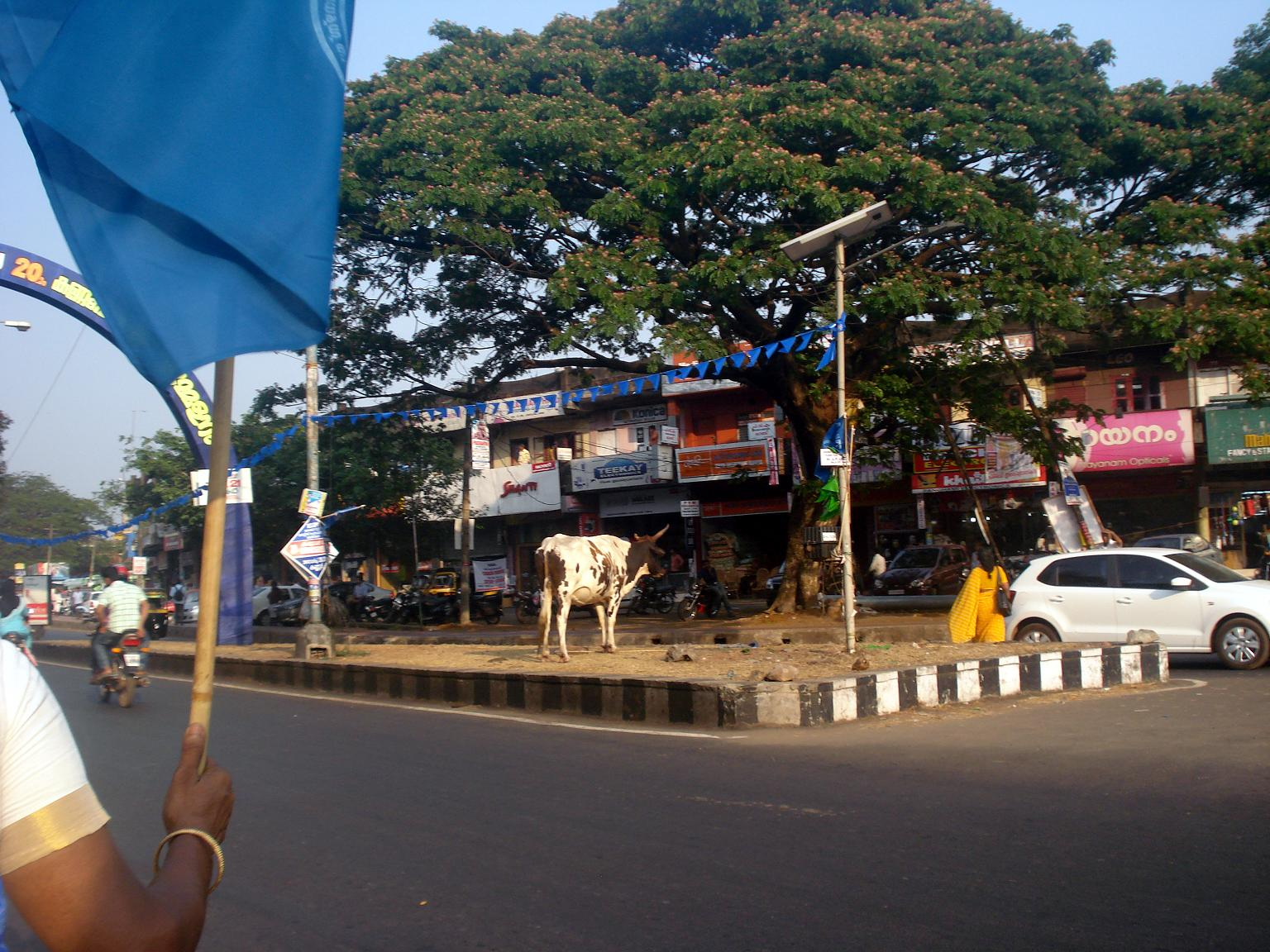
Yogashala Road Junction

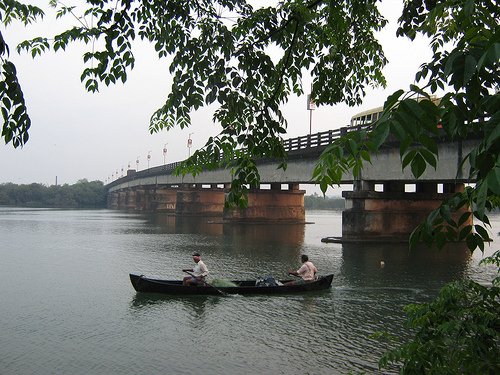
Valapattanam Bridge

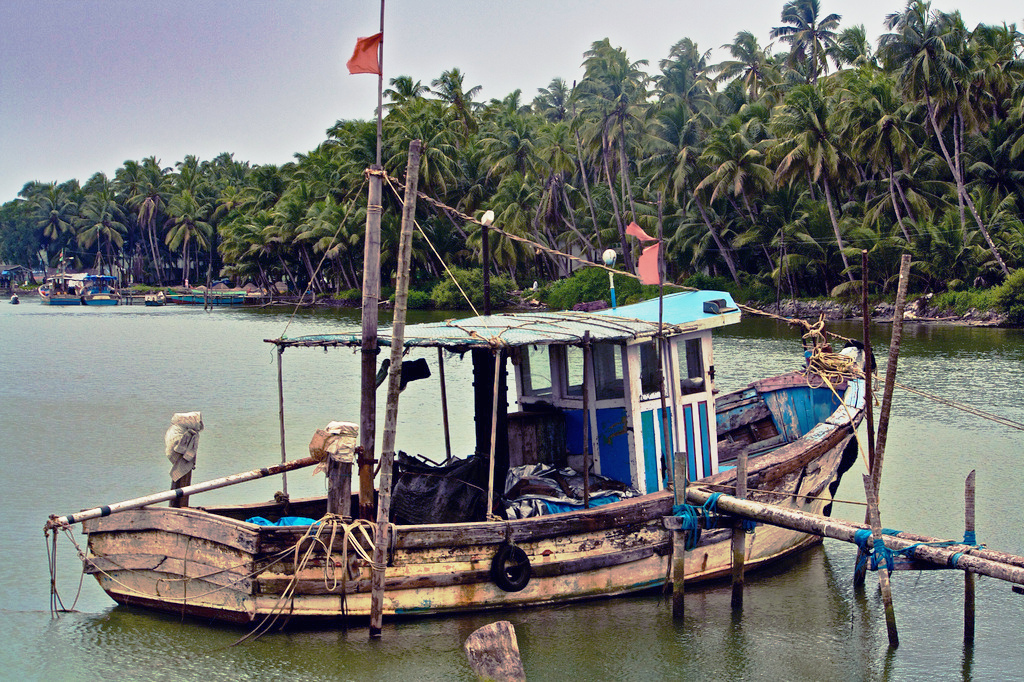
Mattool Ferry

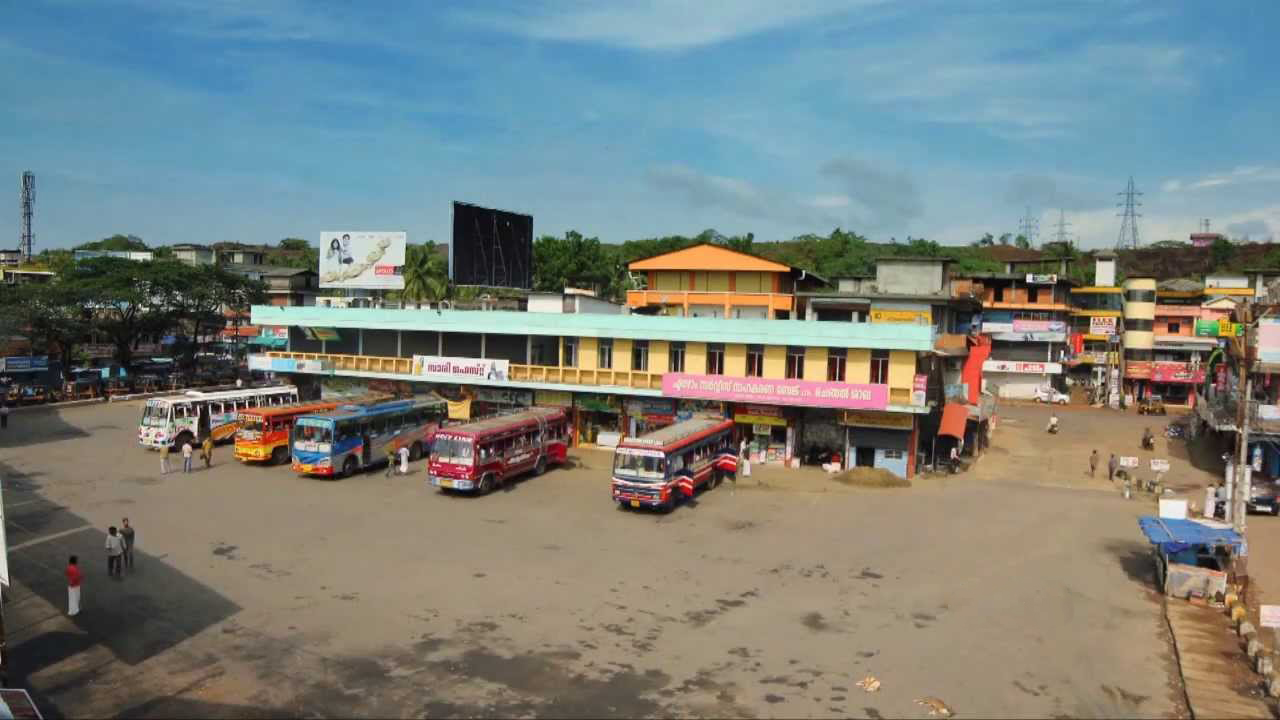
Pazhayangadi Bus Station

== Air Transport ==
Kannur International Airport located at Mattanur in Kannur District, Kerala, India opened for commercial operations on 9 December 2018. It is the fourth international airport in Kerala. The airport will have a 4,000m runway (the longest in the State) and state of the art passenger terminal as well other amenities. Domestic routes include Mumbai, Bangalore, Hyderabad, Chennai, Goa and Hubli while international routes include Abu Dhabi, Sharjah, Doha and Riyadh.

== Kannur port ==
Kannur is an ancient seaport. The nearest all-weather seaport is Mangaluru in Karnataka state. Azhikkal port in Kannur has been included for developing coastal shipping by the Government of India under the National Maritime Development Programme (NMDP). A detailed project report (DPR) has been prepared by ICICI-KINFRA for the development of Azhikkal port. Azhikal port was allocated ₹ 50cr for development in the interim budget of 2016 by the Government of Kerala.

== Transport by Road ==
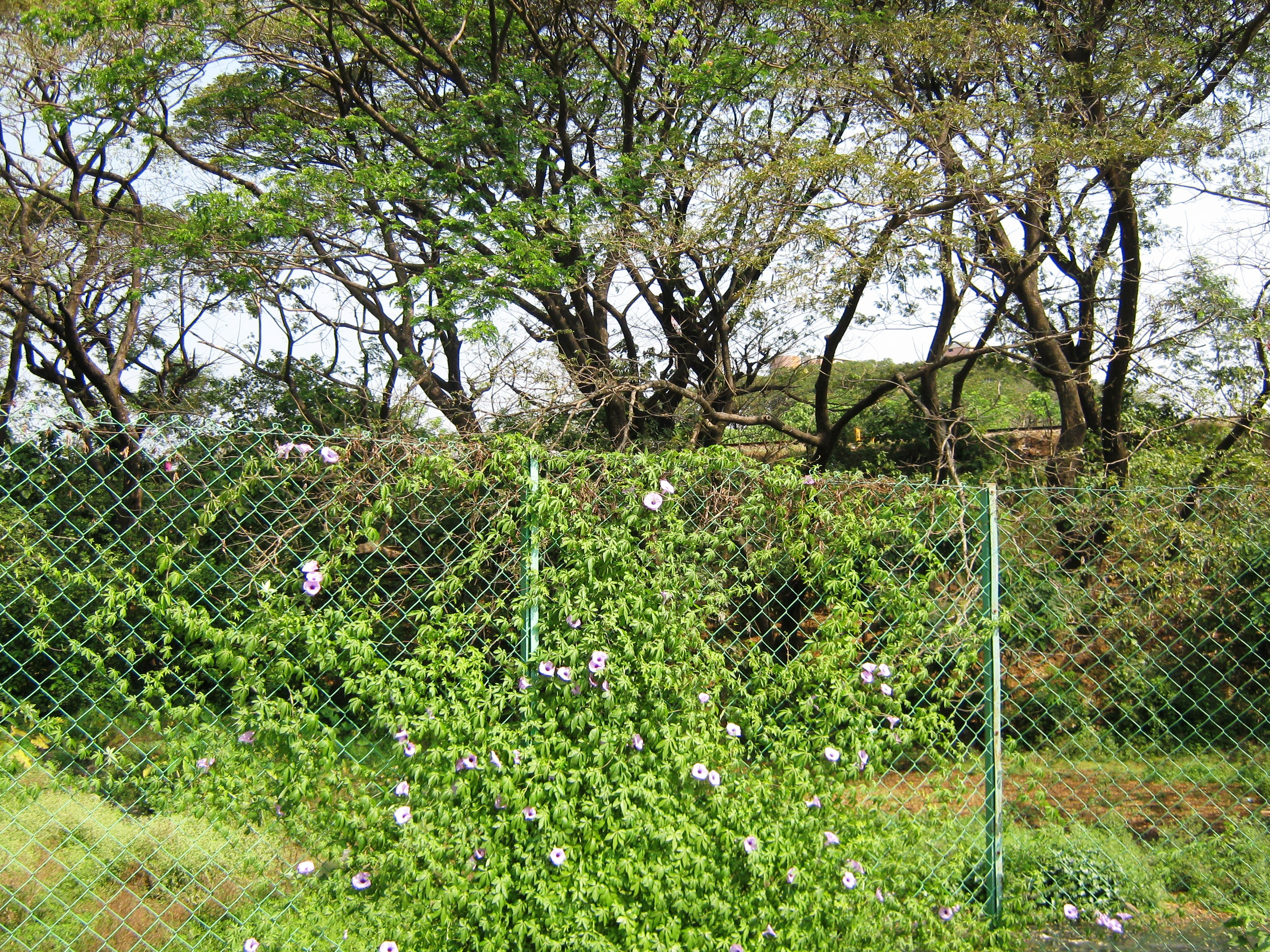
Thavakkara Bus Station has very green surroundings

Kannur is on National Highway 66 or NH 66 (formerly National Highway 17) between Kozhikode and Mangalore. This highway is scheduled to be expanded to four lanes. A bypass for Kannur city is proposed under the NH widening project. Kannur is connected to Kodagu, Mysore and Bangalore in Karnataka by the Thalassery–Coorg–Mysore interstate highway.

Kannur has several private and KSRTC buses plying places inside and outside the district. Kannur is well-connected to its suburbs through several city buses. Kannur city has four bus terminals — Kannur Central Bus Terminal at Thavakkara which is Kerala's biggest private bus terminal, Old Bus Stand near the Jawaharlal Nehru Stadium, City Bus Stand near the District HQ Hospital and the KSRTC bus depot at Caltex Junction (on NH-66). The busiest section of the National Highway 66 is between the towns of Puthiyatheru and Thazhe Chovva (about 10.5 km). There are also KSRTC Depots at Payyanur and Thalassery.

== National Highways ==
National Highway 66 connects Kannur to Mumbai via Mangalore, Udupi and Goa to the north and Kozhikode, Kochi, Thiruvananthapuram and Kanyakumari to the south along the west coast of India. This highway connects the city with the other important cities like, Uppala, Kasaragod, Kanhangad, Payyanur, Taliparamba, Thalassery, Mahe, Vadakara, Koyilandy, Kozhikode, Vengalam, Ramanattukara, Kottakkal, Kuttippuram, Ponnani, (Guruvayoor) Chavakkad, Kodungallur, North Paravur, Edapally and proceed to Kanyakumari.

== State Highways ==
SH 59, the longest state highway in Kerala passes through hilly areas of Kannur district like Cherupuzha, Alakode, Payyavoor, Ulikkal, Iritty, Edoor, Peravoor and Kottiyoor.

SH 38 starts in Chala Bypass Junction (Kannur) and ends in Puthiyangadi (Kozhikode). The highway is 42.9 kilometres (26.7 mi) long. The highway passes through Kadachira, Mavilayi, Peralassery, Kuthuparamba, Panoor, Nadapuram, Kuttiady, Perambra, Ulliyeri Pavangad and Kozhikode.

SH 30 or Thalassery - Coorg Highway starts in Thalassery and ends in Vilamana-Koottupuzha (Kerala-Karnataka state border). The highway is 55.1 kilometres (34.2 mi) long. The highway passes through Kadirur, Kuthuparamba, Mattannur and Iritty.

SH 36 starts in Taliparamba and ends in Iritty. The highway is 46 kilometres (29 mi) long. The highway passes through Sreekandapuram and Irikkur.

== Thavakkara Bus station ==
Thavakkara Bus Terminal, also called Kannur Central Bus Terminal or Central Bus Terminal Complex, is a bus station in Kannur, Kerala, India. It is located near to Kannur Railway Station. It is also India's first bus terminal to be developed on a build-operate- transfer (BOT) basis. The project is a joint venture of the Kannur Municipality and the KK Group, being implemented on Build-Operate-Transfer (BOT) concept. Most of the floors inside the terminal are marked for commercial purposes, which include central lobby, passengers waiting area and parking facilities.

- Multiple Bus bays
- Parking Bay for Cars, Two Wheelers and Autorickshaws
- Food Courts
- Cloakroom
- Passenger Amenities

Thavakkara Bus Terminal, serves as the main boarding & alighting point in Kannur for all the passengers travelling outside city and state. It has buses catering to long distances services and short distance buses. There are many long distance bus services which operates with in Kerala state and to various district headquarters. Interstate bus services towards Mangalore, is also available from Thavakkara Bus Terminal.

The bus stand complex includes one luxury hotel, one budget hotel and one dormitory.

== Railway System ==
Kannur Railway Station is one of the major stations of the Southern Railway, under the jurisdiction of the Palakkad Division. All trains including the Thiruvananthapuram Rajdhani Express and Kochuveli Garib Rath stop at Kannur. Six daily trains and around 15 weekly or bi-weekly trains connect Kannur to the capital Thiruvananthapuram.

Trains starting from Kannur are:

- Kannur - Thiruvananthapuram Jan Shatabdi Express
- Kannur - Yeshwantpur Express (via Palghat and Salem)
- Kannur - Bengaluru City Express via Mangalore, Mysore (tri-weekly)
- Kannur - Bengaluru City Express via Kunigal, Yeswantpur (Four days a week)
- Kannur - Alappuzha Executive Express
- Kannur - Ernakulam Intercity Express

Passenger trains

- Kannur - Coimbatore
- Kannur - Mangalore
- Kannur - Calicut
- Kannur - Shoranur
- Trichur - Kannur
- Kannur - Cheruvathur

Kannur South, Chirakkal, Valapattanam and Pappinisseri are minor railway stations near Kannur where only passenger trains stop. A survey for a railway line from Kannur South to Kannur International Airport in Mattannur was announced in the 2011–2012 Union Railway Budget.Kannur, also known as Cannanore, is one of the busiest railway station in Kerala located in the Kannur City which lies in Shoranur–Mangalore section. It is operated by the Southern Railway of the Indian Railways. There are many trains operating towards Southern Kerala, Tamil Nadu, Mumbai and North India. Kannur and Kannur South are two different stations which serves Kannur City.

This Station has Four platforms, namely Platform No.1, 1A, 2 and 3 and two entrances. Another platform and new exclusive entrance is under construction towards east. The Platform number 1 of the Kannur Railway Station is the second longest railway platform in the state of Kerala.

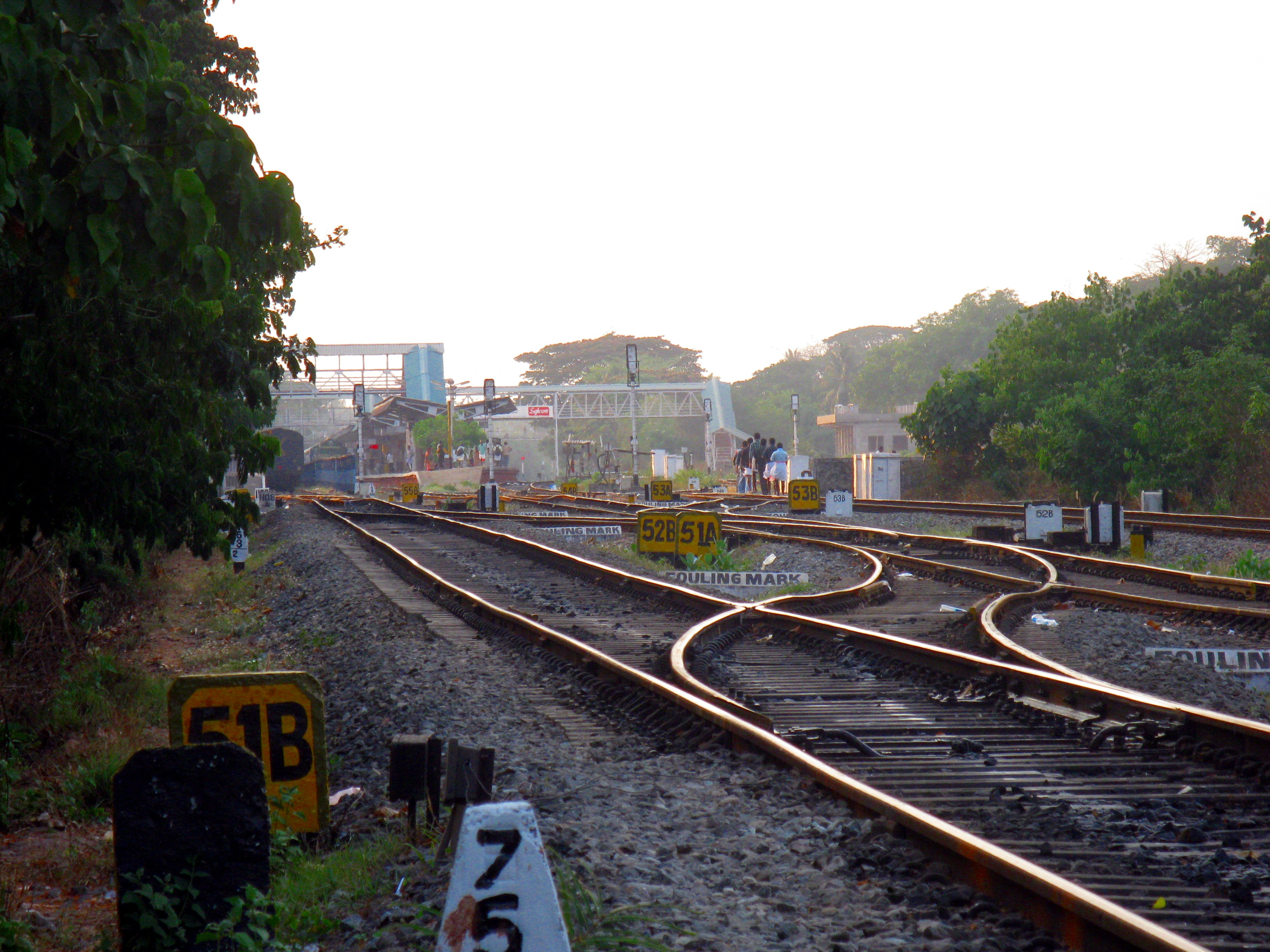
Approaching Kannur Railway Station

There is strong urge from the passengers for extension of various trains and new trains. The trains that could be extended include Matsyagandha Express, Madgaon Intercity Express, Calicut Janshatabdi. It could be achieved by constructing a new pitline and increasing the number of platforms. Kannur-Byndoor passenger can be extended to Bhatkal.

The Kannur Railway Station is one of the few railway stations in Kerala to be selected for Google's plan to deploy WiFi in collaboration with the Union Government of India.

== Important Trains ==
- Kannur - Thiruvananthapuram Jan Shatabdi Express
- Kannur - Yeswantpur Express (Via Palghat and Salem)
- Kannur - Bengaluru City Express (Via Mangaluru)
- Kannur - Ernakulam (Executive Express Thursday, Saturday only)
- Kannur - Alappuzha (Executive Express except Thursday, Saturday)
- Kannur - Ernakulam (Intercity Express)

== Slow Trains ==
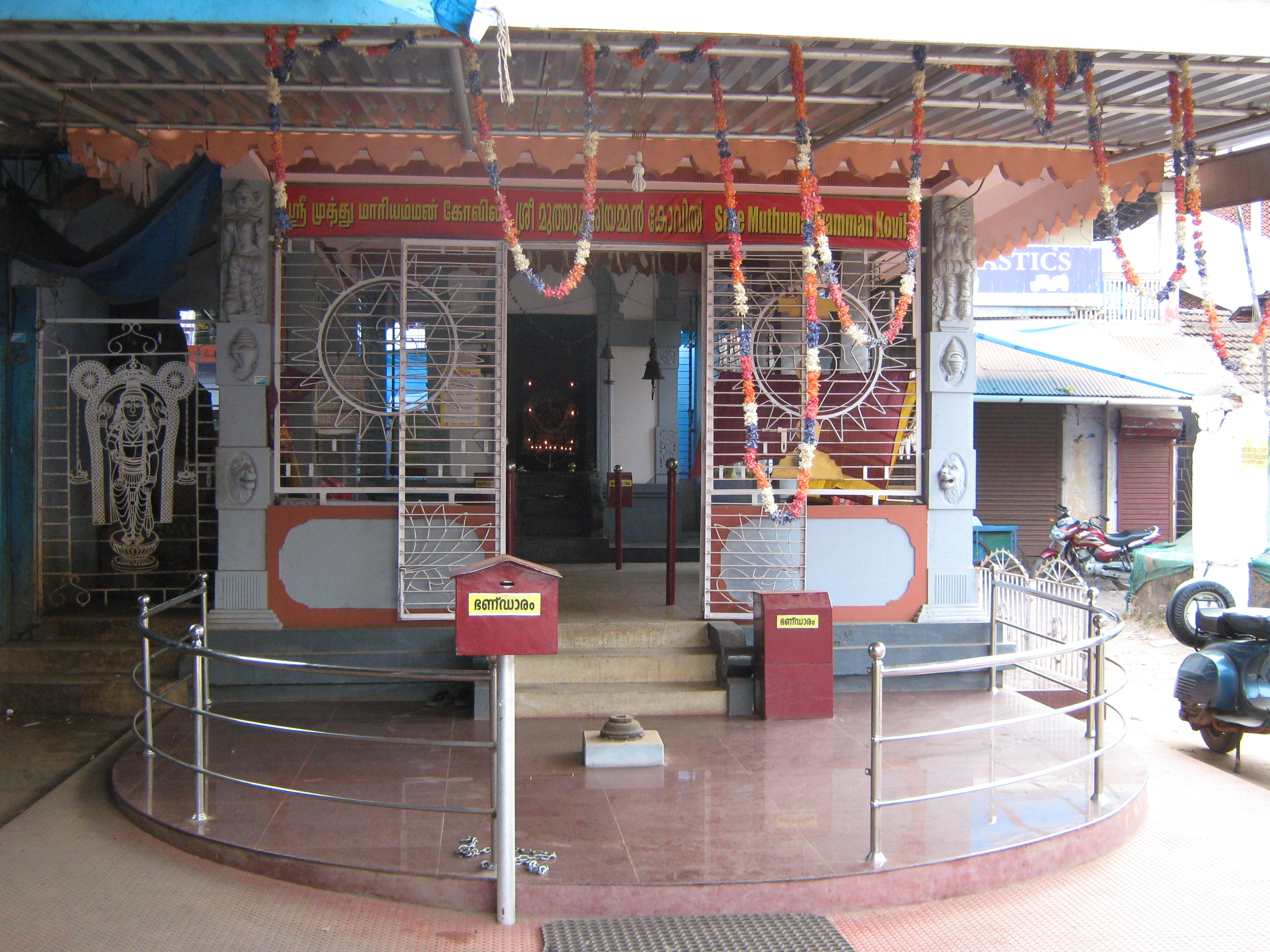
Temple near the Railway Station in Kannur

- Kannur - Coimbatore fast passenger
- Kannur - Mangaluru passenger
- Kannur - Calicut passenger
- Kannur - Shoranur passenger
- Kannur - Cheruvathur passenger
- Kannur - Thrissur passenger
- Kannur - Byndoor passenger (via Mangaluru junction)

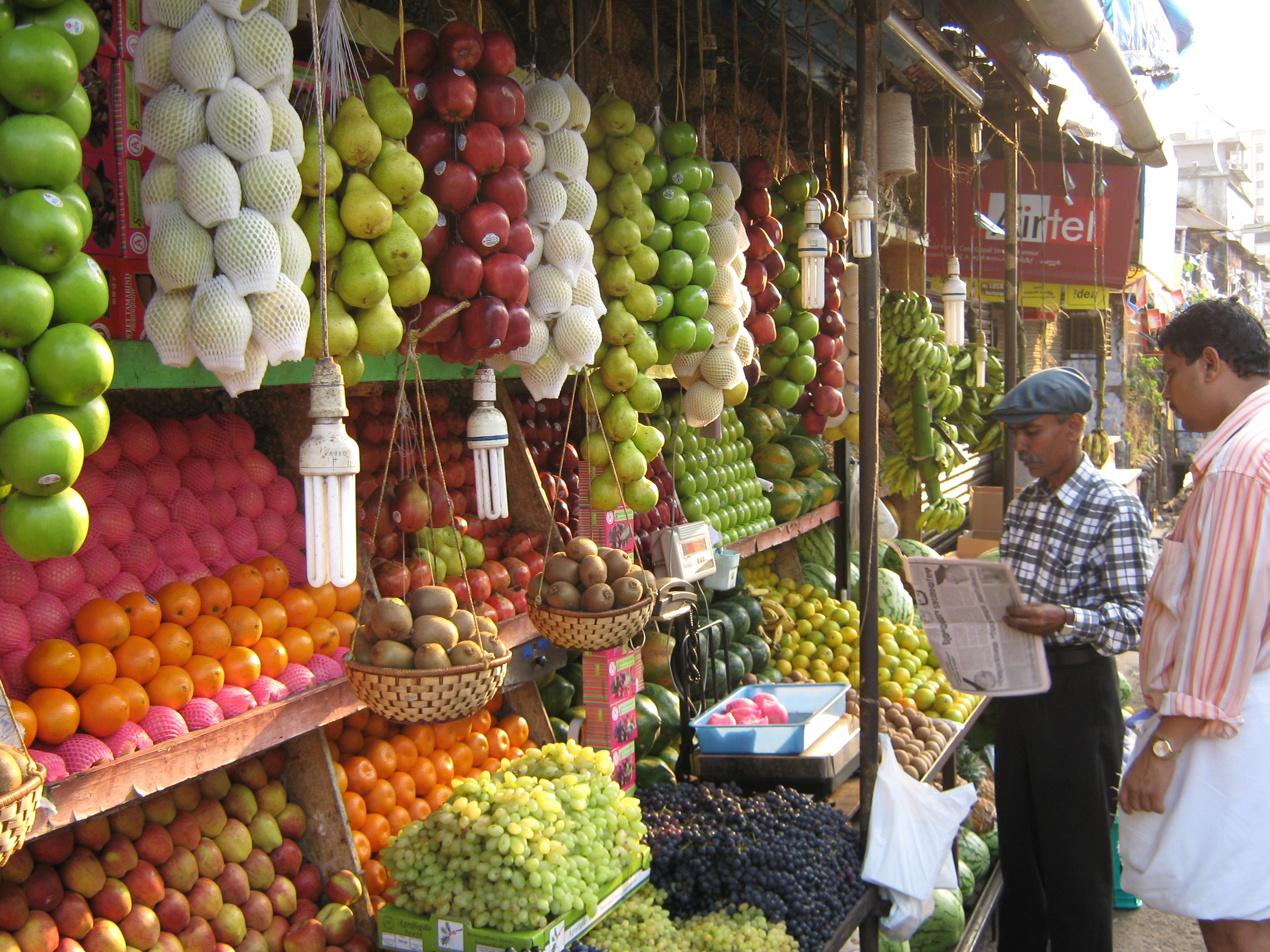
Selling Fruits near the Railway Station

== Other Trains ==
- Hazrat Nizamuddin - Trivandrum Rajdhani Express
- Hazrat Nizamuddin - Ernakulam Mangala Lakshadweep Express
- Chennai - Mangaluru Mail via Podanur
- Chennai - Mangaluru West Coast Express via Coimbatore
- Chennai - Mangaluru Superfast Express via Podanur
- Chennai Egmore - Mangaluru Express via Trichy
- Mumbai (LTT) - Trivandrum Nethravathi Express via Alappuzha
- Mumbai (LTT) - Kochuveli Garibrath Express via Kottayam
- Chandigarh- Kochuveli Kerala Sampark Kranti Express via Alappuzha
- Mangaluru- Trivandrum Malabar express via Kottayam
- Mangaluru- Nagercoil Parasuram express via Kottayam
- Mangaluru- Trivandrum Maveli express via Alappuzha
- Mangaluru- Trivandrum express via Kottayam
- Mangaluru- Coimbatore Intercity s/f express
- Mangaluru- Nagercoil Ernad express via Alappuzha

Kannur is connected to several major Indian cities via daily direct trains. Some of the cities connected, with details of trains, are given below:

- New Dehi by: Trivandrum-Hazrat Nizamuddin Rajdhani Express & Ernakulam - Hazrat Nizamuddin Mangala Lakshadweep Express, Kerala Sampark Kranti Express, Kochuveli-Amritsar Express, Kochuveli-Dehradun express, Navyug express
- Mumbai by: Trivandrum-Lokamanya Tilak (Mumbai) Netravati Express, Kochuveli-Lokmanya Tilak Garibrath express, Kochuveli-Ltt s/f express
- Chennai by: Mangaluru-Chennai (Chennai Mail, West Coast, Egmore and Chennai Express)
- Bangalore by: Kannur-Yeswantpur (2 Express; one via Salem and another via Mangaluru)
- Ahmedabad by: Ernakulam-Okha Express, Nagercoil-Gandhidam express, Thiruvananthapuram-Veraval express, Kochuveli-Bhavnagar express, Kochuveli-Bikaner express, Tirunelveli-Hapa express, Kochuveli-Porbandar express, Coimbatore-Bikaner a/c super fast express
- Pune by: Ernakulam-Pune Poorna Express, Ernakulam Pune Superfast express
- Jaipur by: Ernakulam-Ajmer Marusagar Express
- Goa by: Ernakulam-Madgoan express and all trains passing through Konkan railways
- Hyderabad by: Kacheguda Express
- Kolkata by: Vivek Express

== Facilities at Kannur Railway Station ==
- Retiring rooms
- IRCTC Restaurants
- Online Reservation
- Internet cafe
- Railway Police Force (RPF)
- Railway Mail Service (RMS)
