= Anappanthy =

Anappanthy Anappanthy
- town
- Location in Kerala, India Anappanthy (India)
- Coordinates: 11°55′47″N 75°42′50″E
- Country: India
- State: Kerala
- District: Kannur

Languages
  - Official: Malayalam, English
- Time zone: UTC+5:30 (IST)
- PIN: 670706
- Vehicle registration: KL 78 (Irrity), KL 13 (Kannur) and KL 58 (Thalassery)

Anapanthy is a town in Ayyankunnu Panchayat of Kannur district, Kerala, India.

== Facilities ==
Anapanthy is well connected with roads and communication facilities including broadband Internet and mobile phone service providers. Health and educational institutions are within a few kilometers away. Angadikadavu, Karikkottakary and Vallithode are the neighboring towns.

== History ==
The severe food shortage and political turbulence during the 1920s and 1930s forced the people of central Kerala to search for agricultural land and political security. Malabar - then part of the state of Madras under the British rule - offered them relative political security as well as vast area of forest land to cultivate. However, cholera, fever, and starvation were endemic.

== Economy ==
The major agricultural products are rubber, pepper, cashew and coconut. The name Anapanthy comes from the elephants in that area. There were people who could mate the elephants and train them to work, especially to clear the forest.

Today's Anapanthy Service Cooperative Bank was the first financial institution for the entire Aralam/Ayyankunnu villages. The bank was started in 1940s as a 'Society' with a few members. Today it has grown into a full-fledged bank with many branches in the area.

== Education ==
In 1956 the first elementary school was started here with a single teacher and approximately 30 students. Today the school is known as Government L P School.

== Transportation ==
The national highway passes through Kannur town. Mangalore and Mumbai can be accessed on the northern side and Cochin and Thiruvananthapuram can be accessed on the southern side. The road to the east of Iritty connects to Mysore and Bangalore. The nearest railway station is Kannur on Mangalore-Palakkad line. There are airports at Kannur Airport Mangalore and Calicut.

== Religion ==
Christianity and Hinduism is the religion in this area, many temples and churches are here such as catholic and Pentecostal churches.

- India Pentecostal Church of God, Anapanthy
- Roman Catholic church
- Assemblies of God Church(Pentecostal Church), Anapanthy
- CSI church, Anapanthy
