= Karikkottakary =

- village
- Location within Kerala Location within India
- Coordinates: 12°0′33″N 75°45′15″E
- Country: India
- State: Kerala
- District: Kannur

Languages
  - Official: Malayalam, English
- Time zone: UTC+5:30 (IST)
- PIN: 670704
- Telephone code: 91 490
- ISO 3166 code: IN-KL
- Vehicle registration: KL-78, KL-13, KL-58
- Nearest city: Iritty

Karikkottakary is a small town located 12 km (7.5 mi) east of Iritty in Kannur district, Kerala state. Karikkotakari revenue village is formed on 26 February 2021 by trifurcating Aralam and Ayyankunnu villages.

== History ==
The modern history of this town starts with the arrival of migrants from Kottayam district of Kerala during 1948 soon after the independence of India.

The human settlement in fact is much older, as there is evidence of prehistoric habitation in the form of urn burials that were unearthed while repairing the Karikkottakkari-Edappuzha road in the mid-1970s. This particular spot where the historical relics have been unearthed is hardly 200 meters away from the centre of the Karikkottakkari town

== Notable people ==
- Lucy Kalappurakkal, Former nun and public figure

== Suburbs and villages ==
- Edappuzha, Valathode, Uruppumkutti, Valayamkode, Angadikadavu, Inthumkary and Valiyaparambinkary are the nearest places.

== Transportation ==
The national highway passes through Kannur town. Mangalore and Mumbai can be accessed on the northern side and Cochin and Thiruvananthapuram can be accessed on the southern side. The road to the east of Iritty connects to Mysore and Bangalore. The nearest railway station is Kannur on Mangalore-Palakkad line. The nearest airport is Kannur International Airport.
