= St. George's Church, Puravayal =

St. George church
- St. George Church, Puravayal
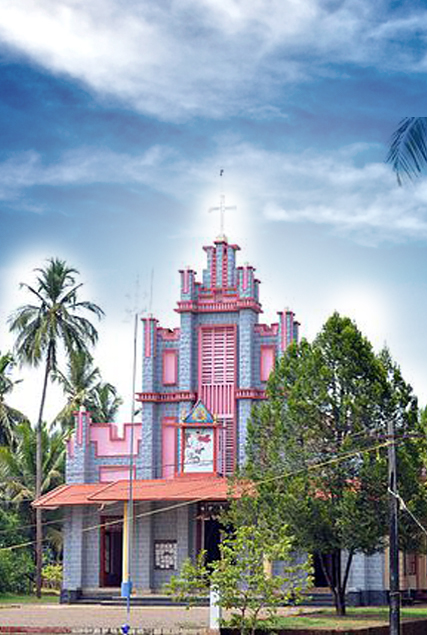
- St. George church
- 12.0634°N 75.6651°E
- Location: Kannur, Kerala
- Country: India
- Denomination: Syro-Malabar Church
- Website: libinkthankachan.wixsite.com/puravayalchurch

Administration
- Archdiocese: Archdiocese of Thalassery

Clergy
- Archbishop: Archbishop Joseph Pamplani
- Vicar: Fr. Poovatholil Joseph

St. George Church is a Catholic church under the Archdiocese of Thalassery. It is located in Puravayal, Kannur, Kerala, India.

The Church is situated at the center of a serene hilly greenery, with its uniquely distinct historical making and structure is an abode of spiritual experience. As a monument that marks the fulfillment of migrated people's quest for spirituality, it was established in the year 1957, in the northern part of Kerala, India. Jurisdictionally, it is located in the Nellickampoil Forane, under the .As the centerpiece of Puravayal village, St. George Church comes under the Ulickal Panchayath (formerly Padiyoor Kalliad), with a 3 kilometers of distance from Ulikkal, on the Iritty-Mattara main road. Puravayal is also fortunate with a Government Lower Primary School and a Public Health Centre.

Apart from the Sunday School and various pious organizations such as Vincent De Paul Society, Credit Union, Maathruvedi, Mission League and Holy Childhood, KCYM, Jagratha Samithi, TSS, etc. that focus on the integral, holistic and spiritual welfare of the people, especially catechetical formation of the younger generation, St. George Church Puravayal has 19 priests and 41 nuns, who serve the universal catholic church from a total number of 494 families in the parish. At present, there are two shrines, namely, St. Joseph's Church (near Moosaanpeedika) and St. Mary's Church (Vattiyamthode) adjacent to this parish.

== History ==
The Church was founded on 1957 in the dedication to Saint George.

It is under the Syro-Malabar Archdiocese of Thalaserry in the District of Kannur
