= Kundoormala =

Kundoormala Kundoormala, Thalassery
- Suburb
- Location in Kerala, India Kundoormala (India)
- Coordinates: 11°46′42″N 75°31′0″E
- Country: India
- State: Kerala
- City: Thalassery

Languages
  - Official: Malayalam, English
- Time zone: UTC+5:30 (IST)
- Postal code: 670107
- ISO 3166 code: IN-KL
- Vehicle registration: KL-58
- Nearest city: Thalassery

Kundoormala is located in Thalassery, Kerala, India. It is 6.5 km (4.0 mi) east of Thalassery Town. The College of Engineering, Thalassery is situated in the hill top of Kundoormala.

== Education ==
The College of Engineering, Thalassery is located in Kundoormala.

== Transportation ==
The national highway passes through Thalassery town. Goa and Mumbai can be accessed on the northern side and Cochin and Thiruvananthapuram can be accessed on the southern side. The road to the east of Iritty connects to Mysore and Bangalore. The nearest railway station is Thalassery on Mangalore-Palakkad line. Trains are available to almost all parts of India subject to advance booking over the internet. There are airports at Kannur Airport Mangalore Airport and Calicut Airport. Both of them are international airports but direct flights are available only to Middle Eastern countries.
