= Cheriyoor =

Village in Taliparamba, Kerala, India

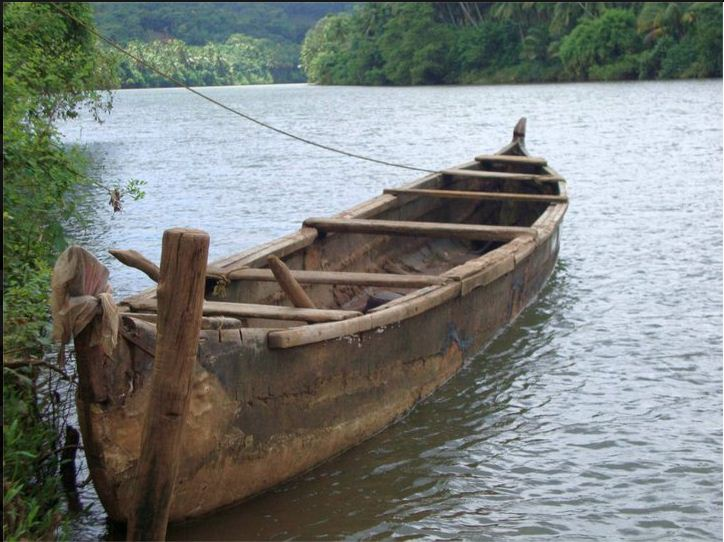
A small boat (thoni) in Cheriyoor River

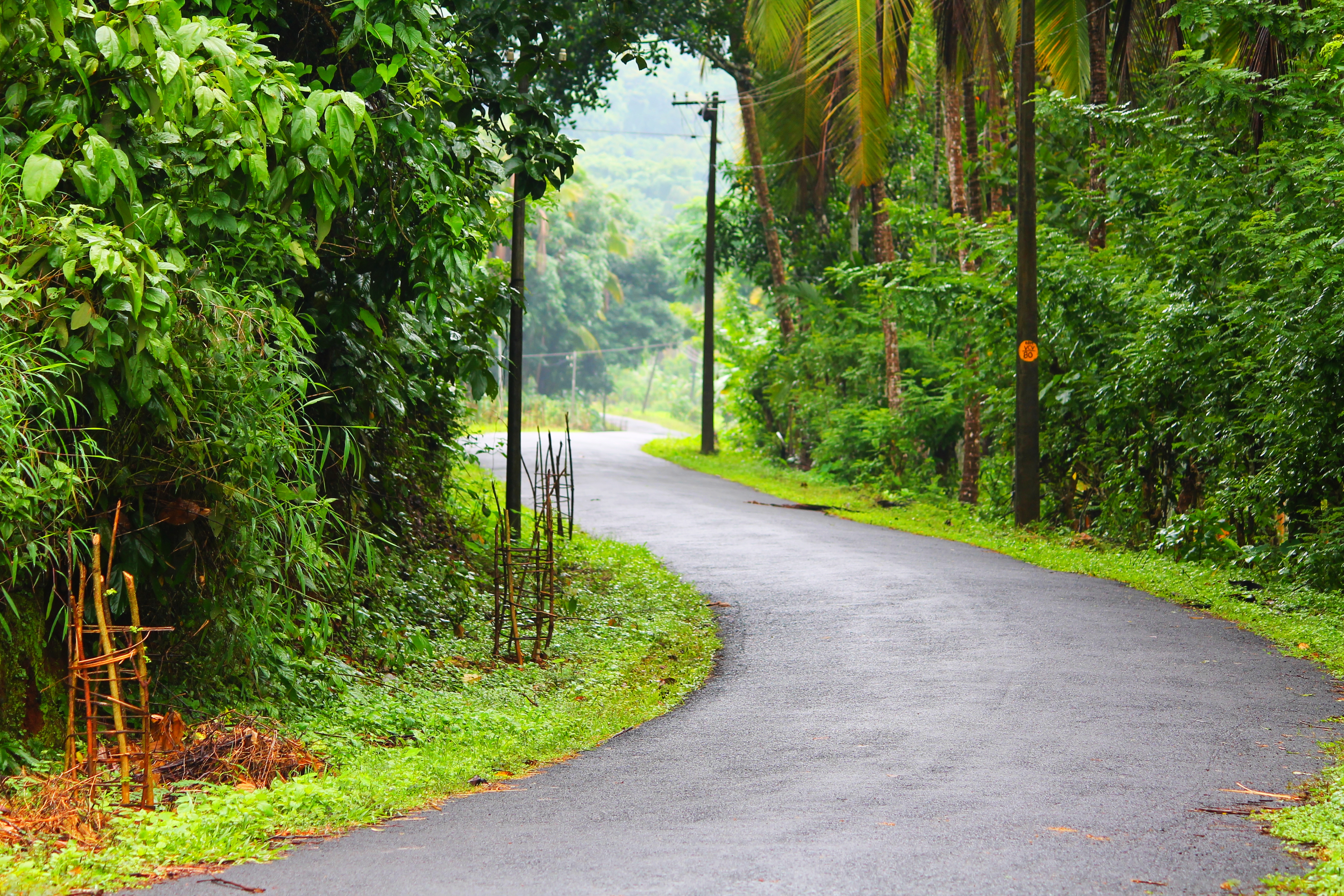
The road that passes through Cheriyoor

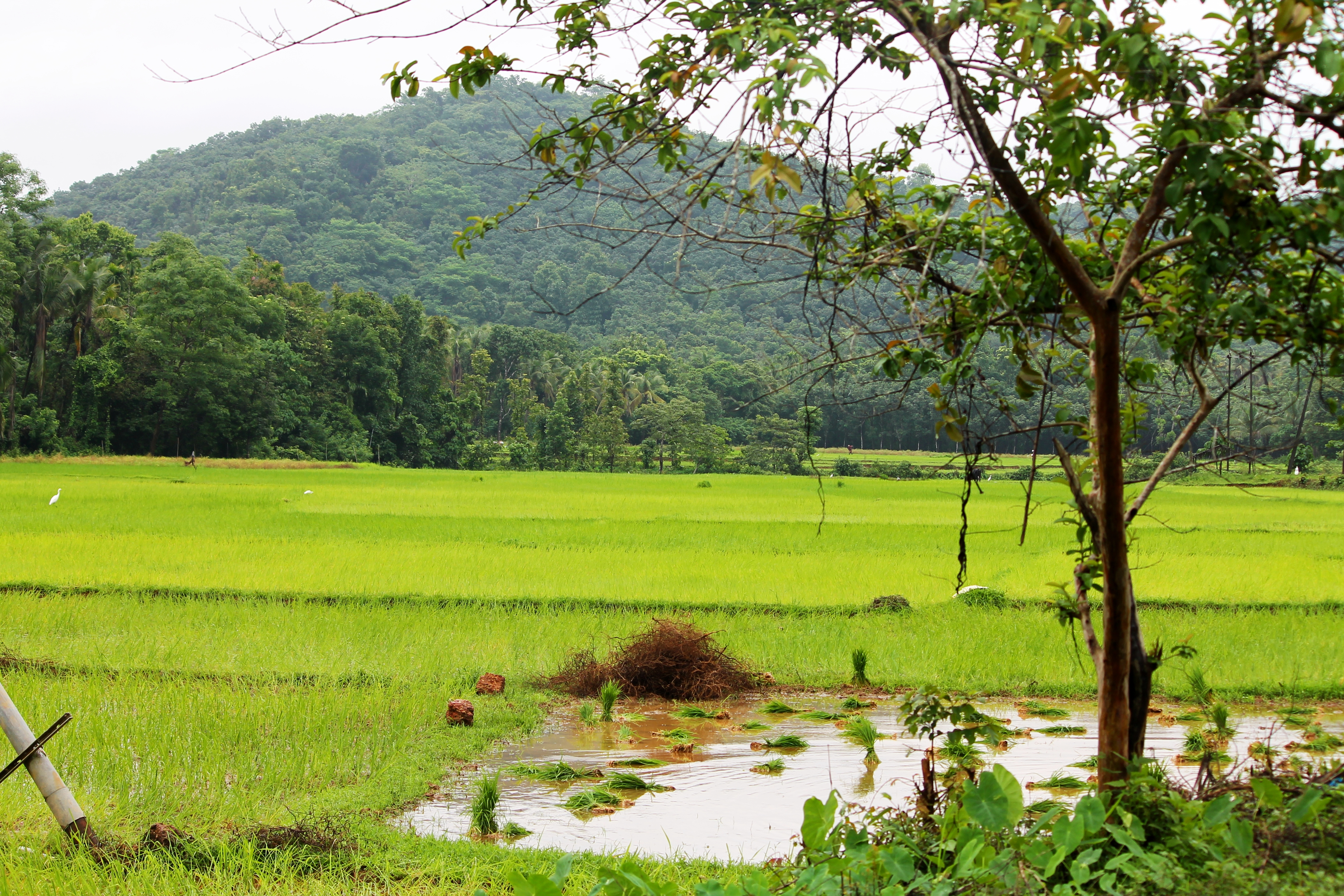
Paddy fields in Cheriyoor

Cheriyoor is a village situated on the banks of the Kuppam River in Taliparamba, Kerala, India.

== Administration ==
Cheriyoor is part of Kuttiyeri village (ward no. 4) which belongs to Pariyaram Grama Panchayath in Kannur district.

== History ==
Cheriyoor is the ancestral home of the famous Malayalam-language poet and translator Kerala Varma Valiya Koil Thampuran (19 February 1845 – 1914). His father Narayanan Namboothiri was a member of the Mullappally illam in Cheriyoor.

== Temples ==
The major religious centers in this village are the ancient Thalakodu Sree Krishna Temple, Sree Puthiya Kunnil Puthiya Bhagavathi Temple, Sree Dharma Sastha Mandiram and Cheriyoor Juma Mazjid.

== Education ==
There is a government high school in Cheriyoor. The 60-year-old upper primary school was upgraded to a high school in 2014.

== Transportation ==
The national highway (NH17) that passes through Taliparamba town can be accessed via the Cheriyoor-Kuttiyeri-Vellavu road. Goa and Mumbai can be accessed on the northern side and Cochin and Thiruvananthapuram can be accessed on the southern side. Taliparamba has a bus station and with services to all parts of the Kannur district. The road to the east of Iritty connects to Mysore and Bangalore. The nearest railway stations are Kannapuram and Kannur on the Mangalore-Palakkad line. The nearest airport, 40 kilometres away, is the Kannur International Airport.
