= Blathur =

- village
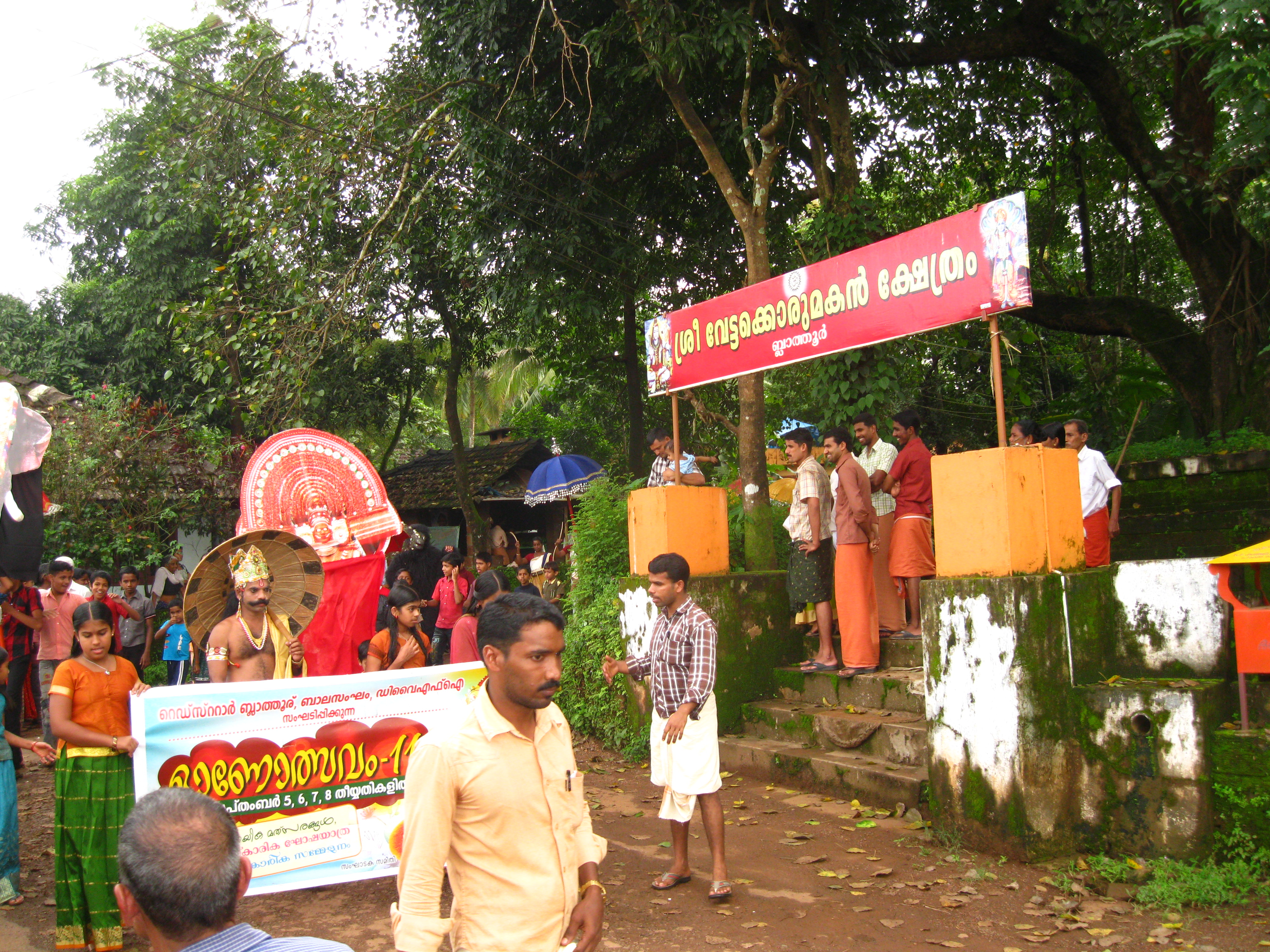
- Onam at Blathur
- Interactive map of Blathur
- Coordinates: 12°01′15″N 75°34′37″E
- Country: India
- State: Kerala
- District: Kannur

Languages
  - Official: Malayalam, English
- Time zone: UTC+5:30 (IST)
- PIN: 670593
- Telephone code: 91-(0)4602
- ISO 3166 code: IN-KL
- Assembly Constituency: Mattannur
- Lok Sabha Constituency: Kannur
- Panchayath: Padiyur Grama Panchayath

Blathur is a village in Kannur, Kerala, India, located approximately 38 kilometres north-east of the district headquarters, Kannur. The nearest town, Irikkur, is estimated to be 7 kilometres from the village itself. Blathur is situated in the Padiyoor Grama Panchayat in Iritty Taluk, on the edge of an estimated 90 acre paddy field, and is 169 meters above sea level. The area is rich in laterite rocks, and the main industry is based on laterite stone mining and agriculture.

== History ==
The protest against the Madras Special Police (Kavumbayi Struggle) took place in the village on 30 December 1946.

== Religious places ==
- Moothedam Vettakkorumakan temple
- Puthiya Bagavathikavu (Pothiyottam)
- Thazhe Palliyath Kottam (Bhairavan Kottam)
- Muthappan Matappura
- Vishnu temple
- Pothi Kottam
- Kelampath Maanjhal Baghavathi Kottam
- Pottan Kottam
- Blathur Juma Masjid
- Blathur Town Masjid (Bilal Masjid)
- Badriyya Masjid, Blathur
- Thaqwa Masjid Jeelani Nagar, Blathur

== Dignitaries ==
- Ramesan Blathur is a Malayalam novelist and short story writer from Blathur who won several awards including the Atlas Kairali Award, Ankanam Noval Award, Abhudabi Sakthi Award, Katathanat Udayavarma Raja Award, and Prof. Joseph Mundassery Award for his novel Perum Aal (D. C. Books).
- Noufal Blathur is a story writer for cinema. He is a former student of Pune Film Institute. His debut Malayalam film Red Wine made a controversy even before its release. He won prestigious K R Mohanan documentary film award for his documentary Therika in 2024.
- Sheriff Blathur, a Prepress and Packaging Expert from Blathur, has extensive experience in training individuals in the Printing and Graphic Design industry on various subjects worldwide.

== Transportation ==
Blathur is conveniently located between several prominent townships and municipalities. It is just 17 minutes from Irikkur, 11 minutes from Payyavoor, 21 minutes from Sreekandapuram, and 20 minutes from Iritty. This accessibility makes Blathur easily reachable from these areas and suggests strong potential for development.

The national highway passes through Taliparamba town. Mangalore and Mumbai can be accessed on the northern side and Cochin and Thiruvananthapuram can be accessed on the southern side. The road to the east connects to Mysore and Bangalore. The nearest railway station is Kannur on Mangalore-Palakkad line. The nearest airport is Kannur International Airport which is only 45 minutes away from Blathur.

== Gallery ==
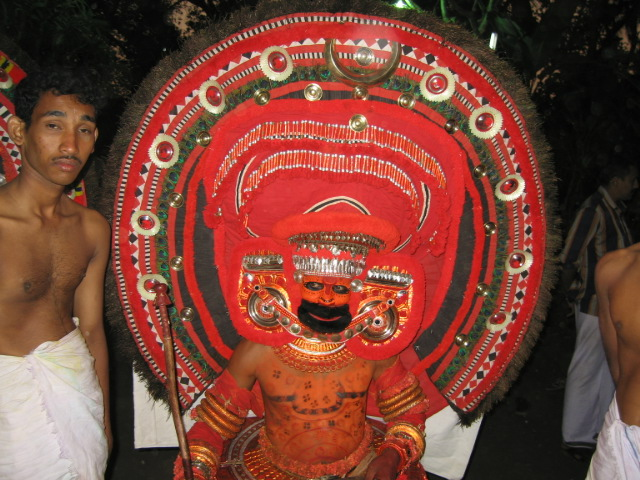
Blathur Theyyam

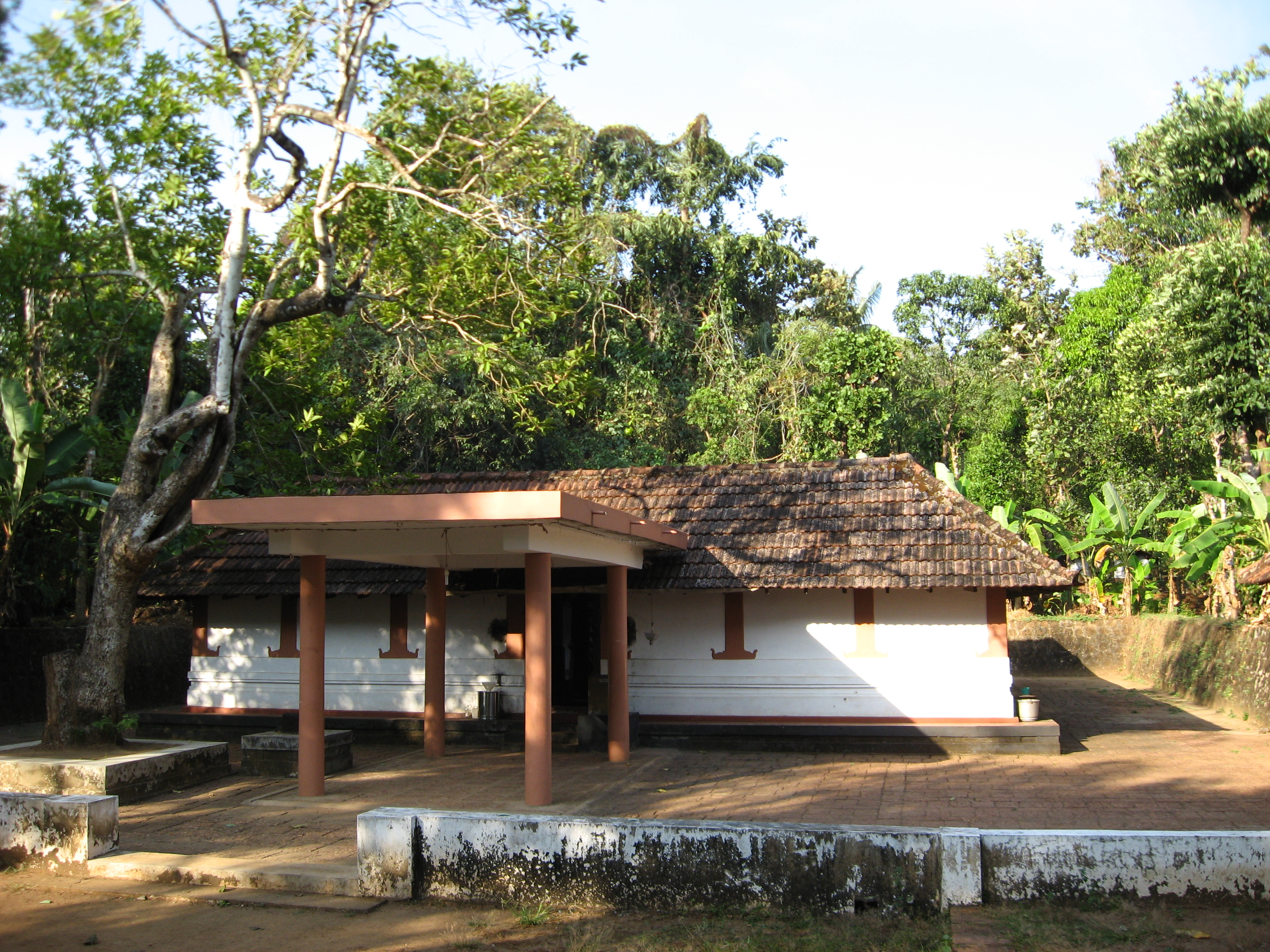
Moothedam temple

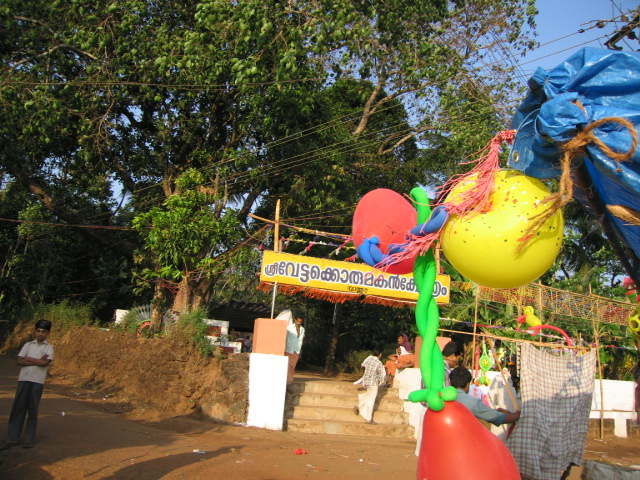
Blathur temple

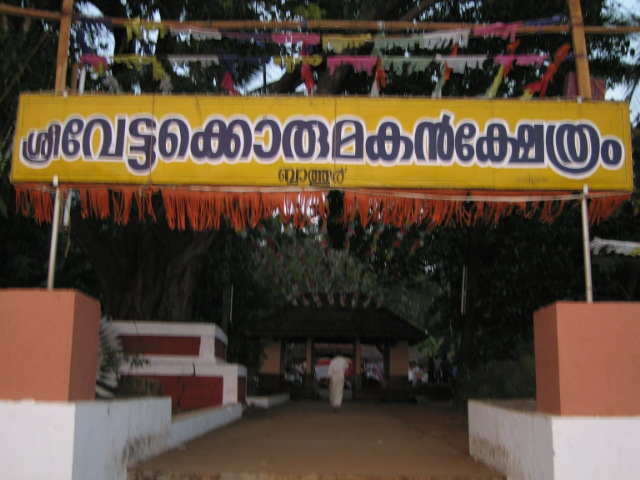
Vettakkoru Makan Temple

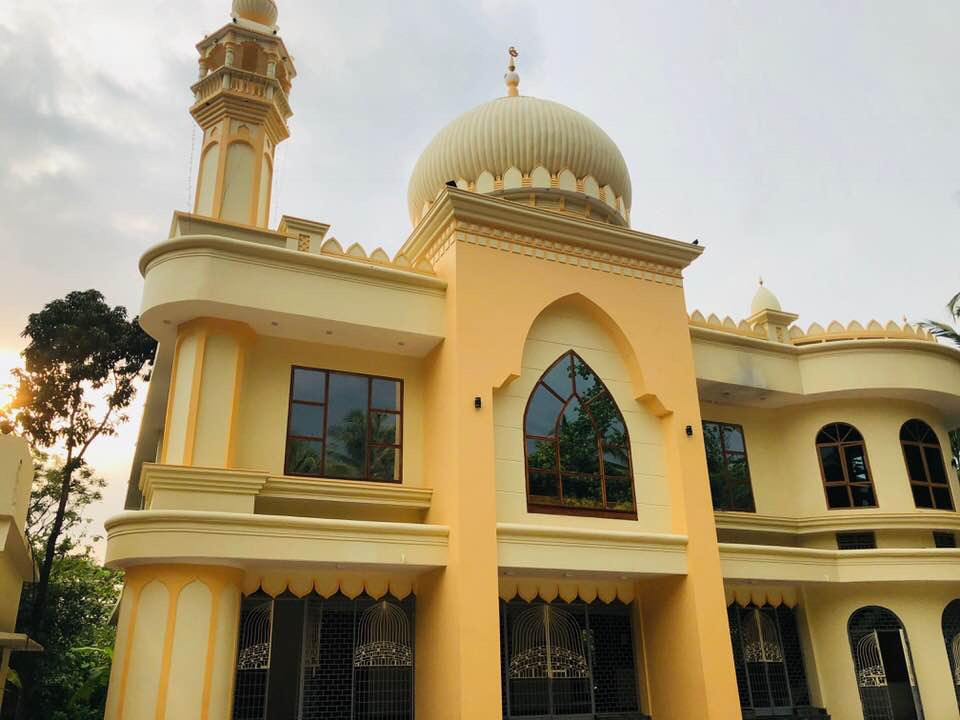
Blathur Juma Masjid

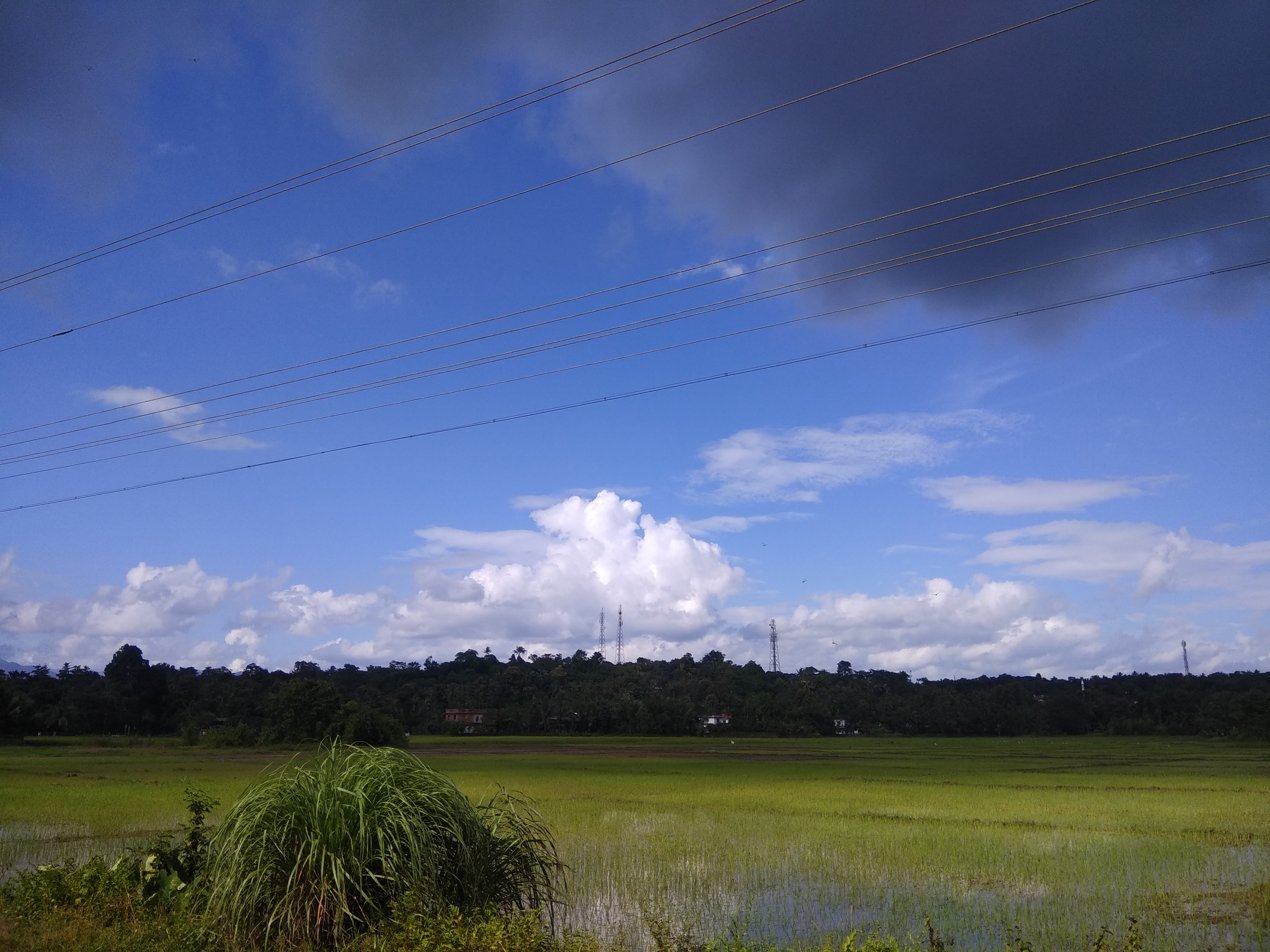
