= Edoor =

- town
- Location in Kerala, India Edoor (India)
- Coordinates: 11°59′55″N 75°43′30″E
- Country: India
- State: Kerala
- District: Kannur

Government
  - Type: Grama panchayat

Languages
  - Official: Malayalam, English
- Time zone: UTC+5:30 (IST)
- PIN: 670704
- Telephone code: 0490
- ISO 3166 code: IN-KL
- Vehicle registration: KL-78
- Nearest city: Iritty
- Lok Sabha constituency: Kannur
- Climate: mildclimate (Köppen)

Edoor is a small town about 6.5 kilometers from Iritty in Kannur district in Kerala, India. Edoor is named by the people from Travancore. Before their migration these lands were forest.

== Economy ==
Edoor town is a small marketplace for the farmer communities of the surrounding regions.

The Akshaya Centre is a local community center that provides access to government documents and assistance to farmers.

== Transportation ==
The national highway passes through Kannur town. Mangalore and Mumbai can be accessed on the northern side and Cochin and Thiruvananthapuram can be accessed on the southern side. The road to the east of Iritty connects to Mysore and Bangalore. The nearest railway station is Kannur on Mangalore-Palakkad line. There are airports at Kannur and Mangalore and Calicut. This place is well-connected to any part of Kannur and other parts of Kerala by road.

Long-distance bus service is available through Red Bus.

== Tourism ==
Tourist attractions include the Vembuzha River, St. Mary's Roman Catholic Church, Assemblies of God in India(Pentecostal Church) in Veerpad, Mundayamparambu Temple and the Aralam Wildlife Sanctuary.

Kolikadavu, Angadikadavu and Aralam are the nearest towns.
