= Keezhur =

- village
- Location in Kerala, India
- Coordinates: 11°58′0″N 75°40′0″E
- Country: India
- State: Kerala
- District: Kannur

Population (2011)
  - Total: 16,597

Languages
  - Official: Malayalam, English
- Time zone: UTC+5:30 (IST)
- PIN: 670 703
- Telephone code: 91 (0)490 249
- ISO 3166 code: IN-KL
- Vehicle registration: KL 13 and KL 58-
- Nearest city: Iritty
- Lok Sabha constituency: Kannur
- Vidhan Sabha constituency: Peravoor

Keezhur is a village in Irrity municipality of Kannur district in the Indian state of Kerala near Iritty. Keezhur Mahadeva and Mahavishnu Temples are in this village. The Bavali river flows through Keezhur.

== Demographics ==
As of 2011 India census, Keezhur had a population of 16597 with 8021 males and 8576 females.

== Educational institutions ==
- Mahatma Gandhi College, Keezhur Kunnu was founded by Iritty Educational Society and is affiliated to the Kannur University. Initially the college was affiliated to University of Calicut.
- VUPS - The school where students of this village get their primary education.
- Iritty Higher Secondary School - Over 50 years of service from standard 5th to 12th

== Vivekananda Samskarika Kendram ==
This acts as a cultural centre of Keezhur. Thousands of people in this region are readers of the library.

== Keezhur Sree Mahadeva Temple ==
This temple is on the banks of Bavali river, where thousands of people offer their prayers to Lord Shiva. The eight-day long festival in the month of Meenam and Shivaratri are the main festivals of this temple.

== Transportation ==
The national highway passes through Kannur town. Mangalore and Mumbai can be accessed on the northern side and Cochin and Thiruvananthapuram can be accessed on the southern side.

The road to the east of Iritty connects to Mysore and Bangalore.

The nearest railway station is Kannur on Mangalore-Palakkad line. There are airports at Mangalore and Calicut.
