= Dimeria kalliadense =

Scientific classification
- Kingdom: Plantae
- Clade: Tracheophytes
- Clade: Angiosperms
- Clade: Monocots
- Clade: Commelinids
- Order: Poales
- Family: Poaceae
- Subfamily: Panicoideae
- Genus: Dimeria
- Species: D. kalliadense

Binomial name
- Dimeria kalliadense Biju, Josekutty & Augustine

Species of grass

Dimeria kalliadense is a plant in the family Poaceae collected from Northern Kerala. It grows up to 10 centimeters long. The plant has been found in Blathur, Peringome and Kanai in Kannur District and also at Karinthalam, Madikai and Seethamgoli in Kasaragod district in Kerala.
