= Vattiyamthode =

Vattiamthode
- Interactive map of Vattiamthode
- Coordinates: 12.07529°N 75.66464°E
- Country: India
- State: Kerala
- District: Kannur
- Time zone: UTC+5:30 (IST)
- PIN: 670705
- Telephone code: 0460
- Vehicle registration: KL-78

Vattiyamthode is a small town located almost 12 km from Iritty of Kannur district, Kerala, India.

== History ==
The modern history of this town starts with the arrival of migrants from Kottayam district of Kerala during 1948.

== Transportation ==
The national highway passes through Kannur town. Mangalore and Mumbai can be accessed on the northern side and Cochin and Thiruvananthapuram can be accessed on the southern side. The road to the east of Iritty connects to Mysore and Bangalore. The nearest railway station is Kannur on Mangalore-Palakkad line. There are airports at Mangalore and Calicut.
