= Thalakodu Sree Krishna Temple =

Hindu temple

Thalakodu Sree Krishna Temple is an ancient Sri Krishna temple located in the village of Cheriyoor, near Taliparamba in the Indian state of Kerala. This temple belongs to Sri Mullappally illam, Cheriyoor and is open to all Hindus.
