= Uruppumkutty =

- village
- Location in Kerala, India Uruppumkutty (India)
- Coordinates: 12°0′33″N 75°45′15″E
- Country: India
- State: Kerala
- District: Kannur

Government
  - Body: Ayyankunnu Panchayath

Languages
  - Official: Malayalam, English
- Time zone: UTC+5:30 (IST)
- PIN: 670706(Angadikadavu Post Office)
- Telephone code: 91 490
- ISO 3166 code: IN-KL
- Vehicle registration: KL-13, KL-58
- Nearest city: Iritty

Uruppumkutty is a small hamlet in Ayyankunnu Panchayat Iritty Taluk, Kannur District, Kerala State, India. Uruppumkutty is about 18 km from Iritty.

== Economy ==
Rubber plantations are a major source of income for the local population.

== Demographics ==
The place has a large population of Syrian Catholic Christians.

== Transportation ==
The national highway passes through Kannur town. Mangalore and Mumbai can be accessed on the northern side and Cochin and Thiruvananthapuram can be accessed on the southern side. The road to the east of Iritty connects to Mysore and Bangalore. The nearest railway stations are at Thalassery (Code:TLY) and Kannur (Code:CAN) on Shoranur–Mangalore section. The nearest airports are at Kannur and Kozhikode.
