= Punnad =

Punnad Punnad
- village
- Location in Kerala, India Punnad (India)
- Coordinates: 11°58′0″N 75°38′0″E
- Country: India
- State: Kerala
- District: Kannur

Languages
  - Official: Malayalam, English
- Time zone: UTC+5:30 (IST)
- PIN: 670 703
- ISO 3166 code: IN-KL
- Vehicle registration: KL-78
- Nearest city: Iritty
- Literacy: 100%
- Lok Sabha constituency: Kannur
- Vidhan Sabha constituency: Peravoor

Punnad is a town in Irrity Municipality in Kannur district in the state of Kerala, India.

== Location ==
Punnad is near Iritty and it is within Iritty Municipality and Iritty Taluk. Punnad is situated beside the Tellicherry-Coorg road, 34.6 kilometres (21.5 mi) from Tellicherry, and 37.5 kilometres (23.3 mi) from Kannur.

== History ==
Punnad was a part of Kingdom of Kottayam, Malabar Province.

== Communal clashes ==
There has been some communal violence over the years from 2005 till almost 2010, including political clashes and murders. Aswini Kumar's murder and Yakub's murder an after result of one of these clashes.

== Transportation ==
The national highway passes through Kannur town. Mangalore and Mumbai can be accessed on the northern side and Cochin and Thiruvananthapuram can be accessed on the southern side. The road to the east of Iritty connects to Mysore and Bangalore. The nearest railway stations are Kannur Railway Station and Thalassery Railway Station on Mangalore–Palakkad line. There are airports at Kannur, Mangalore and Calicut.
