= Lucy Kalappurakkal =

Franciscan religious sister and activist(born 1965)

Lucy Kalapura
- Born: 5 June 1965 (age 61); Karikkottakary, Kannur
- Citizenship: Indian
- Education: St Thomas highschool , Karikkottakary.
- Alma mater: Nirmalagiri College, Kuthuparamba
- Occupations: Former nun; Retd teacher
- Years active: 2018 - present
- Notable work: Karthavinte Namathil
- Parent(s): Kunjettan, Rosa
- Relatives: Scaria (Grandfather)

Lucy Kalapura (born 5 June 1965), is former nun who previously belonged to the Franciscan Clarist Congregation in Mananthavady, Wayanad.

== Activism ==
Kalappurakkal joined the Franciscan Clarist Congregation at the age of 17 after she made a private vow to become a nun.

She was criticized by the church for speaking out against Bishop Franco Mulakkal, who was then accused of multiple counts of sexual assault of another nun at Kuravilangad convent in Kerala's Kottayam district between 2014 and 2016. The bishop was arrested in 2018 on charges of rape. Kalappurakkal was accused of living a life that is against "the principles of religious life" and the rules of the congregation. Even though she was denied permission by her superiors, she had acquired a driver's license, bought a car, published a poetry book and received remuneration for the book. She was also accused of arriving at the convent late in the night, participating in a news channel's discussion, letting a female journalist live with her in the convent and appearing in public without wearing the nun's habit. In 2019, she received a third warning letter from the congregation that if she did not provide adequate reasons for her actions she would be expelled from the convent.
