= Keezhur Kunnu =

Keezhur Kunnu Keezhur Theru
- Town
- Country: India
- State: Kerala
- District: Kannur

Languages
  - Official: Malayalam, English
- Time zone: UTC+5:30 (IST)
- PIN: 670703
- Telephone code: 91 (0)490 249
- ISO 3166 code: IN-KL
- Vehicle registration: KL 78
- Lok Sabha constituency: Kannur

Keezhur Kunnu or Keezhoor Kunnu, also known as Keezhur Theru, is a small town near Iritty, in Kannur district, Kerala, India.

A majority of the people living in this area belong to the Saliya caste.

== History ==
In September 2017, bombs were recovered from a temple in the town.

== Educational institutions ==
Mahatma Gandhi College, Keezhur Kunnu was founded by Iritty Educational Society and is affiliated to the Kannur University. Initially the college was affiliated to University of Calicut.

There is also an English medium school, SDA English Medium School, which follows the Indian Certificate of Secondary Education syllabus.

== Transportation ==
The national highway passes through Kannur town. Mangalore and Mumbai can be accessed on the northern side and Cochin and Thiruvananthapuram can be accessed on the southern side. The road to the east of Iritty connects to Mysore and Bangalore. The nearest railway station is Kannur on Mangalore-Palakkad line. There are airports at Mangalore and Calicut.
