= Angadikadavu =

- village
- Country: India
- State: Kerala
- District: Kannur

Languages
  - Official: Malayalam, English
- Time zone: UTC+5:30 (IST)
- PIN: 670706
- Telephone code: 0490
- ISO 3166 code: IN-KL
- Vehicle registration: KL-78
- Nearest city: Iritty
- Literacy: 99%
- Lok Sabha constituency: Kannur
- Assembly constituency: Peravoor

Angadikadavu is a town in Kannur district, Kerala, India. It is near the Karnataka border.

== Education ==
Don Bosco Arts & Science College is the major higher educational institute in Angadikadavu. Also, Sacred Heart School, Angadikadavu is located in the town.

== Transportation ==
The national highway passes through Kannur town. Mangalore and Mumbai can be accessed on the northern side and Cochin and Thiruvananthapuram can be accessed on the southern side. The road to the east of Iritty connects to Mysore and Bangalore. The nearest railway station is Kannur on Mangalore-Palakkad line. There are airports at Kannur, Mangalore and Calicut.
