= Ayyankunnu =

- village
- Location in Kerala, India Ayyankunnu (India)
- Coordinates: 12°2′0″N 75°44′0″E
- Country: India
- State: Kerala
- District: Kannur
- Taluk: Iritty

Government
  - Type: Panchayati raj (India)
  - Body: Ayyankunnu Grama Panchayat

Area
  - Total: 88.28 km^{2} (34.09 sq mi)

Population (2011)
  - Total: 22,436
  - Density: 254.1/km^{2} (658.2/sq mi)

Languages
  - Official: Malayalam, English
- Time zone: UTC+5:30 (IST)
- ISO 3166 code: IN-KL

Ayyankunnu is a village in Kannur district in the Indian state of Kerala.The name Ayyankunnu came from the five hills "Anchu Kunnu".

== Demographics ==
As of 2011 Census, Ayyankunnu village had a population of 22,436 which constitutes 11,255 males and 11,181 females. Ayyankunnu village spreads over an area of 88.28 km^{2} (34.09 sq mi) with 5,387 families residing in it. The sex ratio of village was 993 lower than state average of 1084. Population of children in the age group 0-6 was 2,292 (10.2%) where 1,193 are males and 1,099 are females. Ayyankunnu had an overall literacy of 95.4% higher than state average of 94%. The male literacy stands at 96.4% and female literacy was 94.4%.

== Geography ==
Ayyankunnu is a hilly village on the eastern side of Kannur district. The terrain is undulating, and the extreme eastern side has forests bordering Karnataka state.

Ayyankunnu was one of the panchayats in Iritty taluk that were severely affected by the 2018 Kerala floods. Thirty-five hectares of land was destroyed by landslides and downstream due to soil deposition by mudflow. Rubber, coconut, and areca nut plantations in the midlands (82 m) and mid uplands (166 m) in the panchayat were the most affected due to landslides.

== Transportation ==
The national highway passes through Kannur town. Mangalore and Mumbai can be accessed on the northern side and Cochin and Thiruvananthapuram can be accessed on the southern side. The road to the east of Iritty connects to Mysore and Bangalore. The nearest railway station is Kannur on Shoranur-Mangalore section line. The nearest international airport is Kannur International Airport and Mangalore, Calicut airports are not far away.
