= Aralam =

- Village
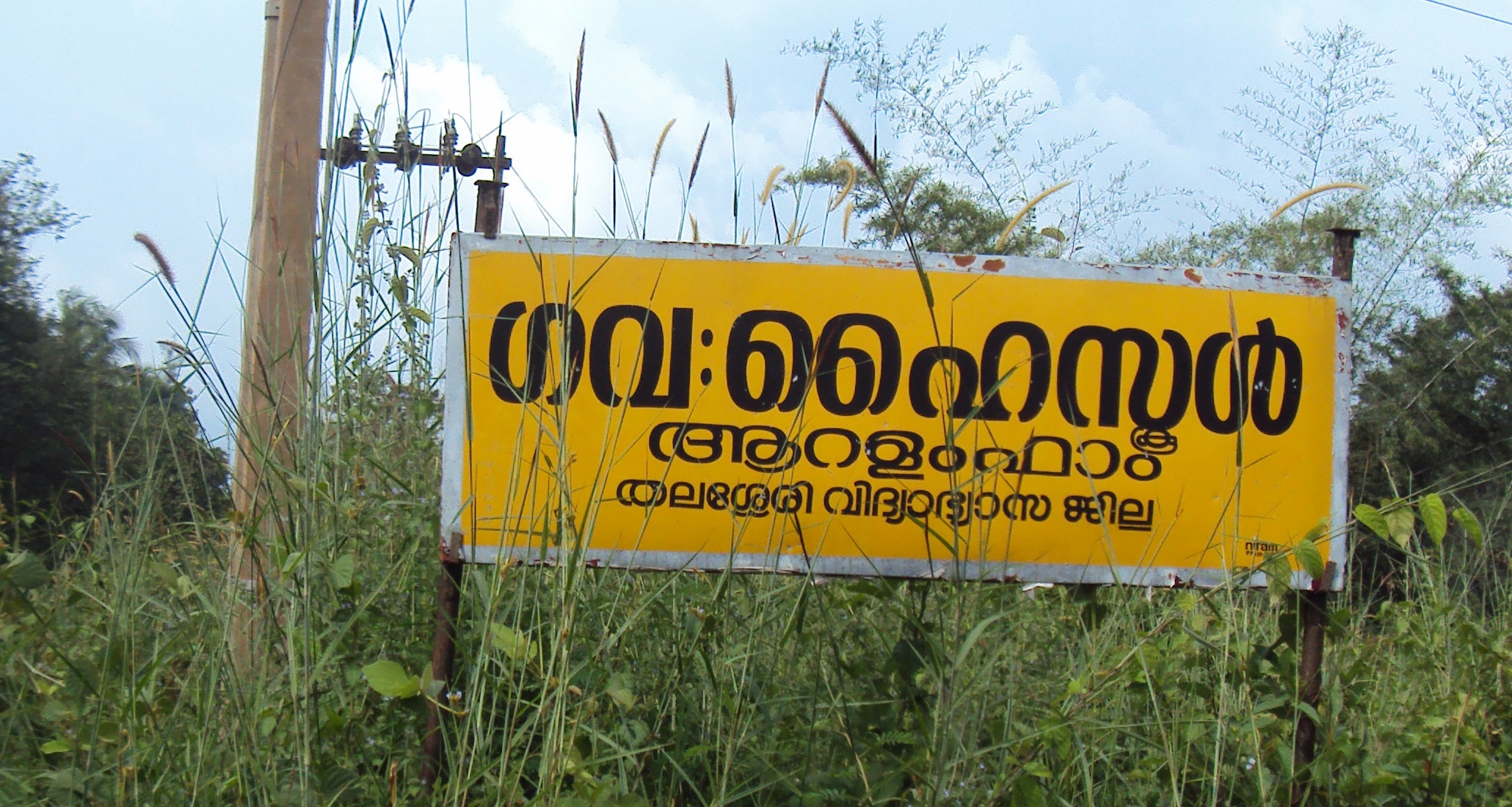
- Aralam Farm School

- Location in Kerala, India
- Coordinates: 11.999220°N 75.764010°E
- Country: India
- State: Kerala
- District: Kannur

Government
  - Type: Panchayati raj (India)
  - Body: Aralam Grama Panchayat

Area
  - Total: 112.45 km^{2} (43.42 sq mi)

Population (2011)
  - Total: 29,328
  - Density: 260.81/km^{2} (675.49/sq mi)

Languages
  - Official: Malayalam, English
- Time zone: UTC+5:30 (IST)
- ISO 3166 code: IN-KL
- Vehicle registration: KL-78

Aralam is a large village and grama panchayat in Kannur district in the Indian state of Kerala. Aralam grama panchayat borders Karnataka to the east.

== Demographics ==
As of 2011 Census, Aralam had a population of 29,328 people which constitutes 14,438 males and 14,890 females. Aralam village spreads over an area of 112.45 km^{2} (43.42 sq mi) with 6,904 families residing in it. The sex ratio of Aralam was 1,031 lower than state average of 1,084. Population of children in the age group 0-6 was 3,180 (10.8%) where 1,617 are males and 1,563 are females. Aralam had an overall literacy of 89.9%, lower than state average of 94%. The male literacy stands at 92.7% and female literacy was 87.3%.

== Economy ==
Aralam Panchayat is mainly an agrarian economy. The major cultivated crops are coconut, cashew, pepper, rubber and areca nut. Aralam was one of severely affected areas in Kannur district during 2018 Kerala floods. 22% of the affected areas were in the side slope of mid-highlands (101 m) and 7% in the river bank of midlands (61 m).

== Education ==
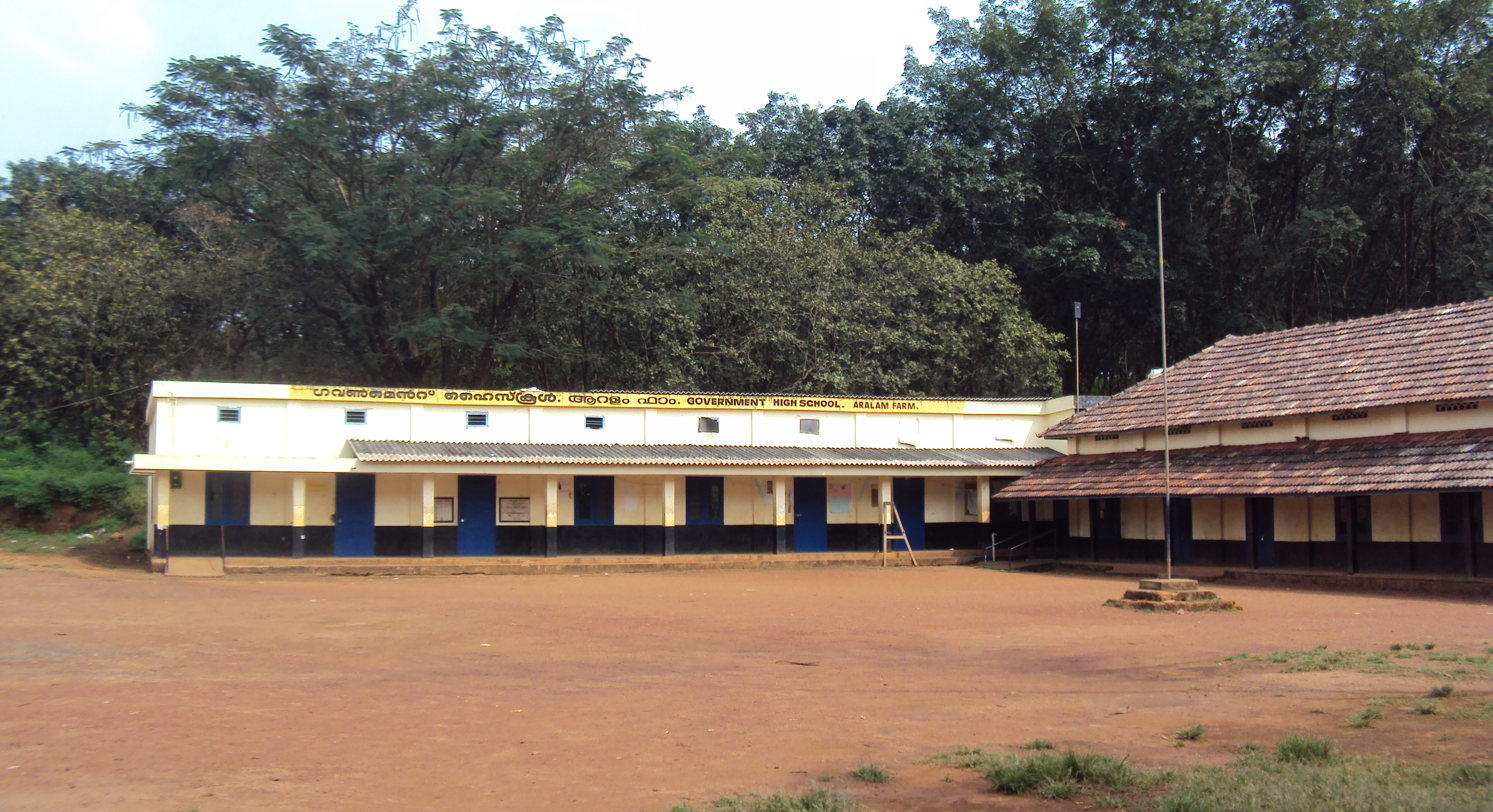
Aralam High School

The village has a Government Higher Secondary School at Aralam and two aided Higher Secondaries, one at Edoor, St. Mary's HSS and the other at Velimanam, St. Sebastian's HSS.

== Notable sites ==
- Aralam Wildlife Sanctuary

== Transportation ==
The national highway passes through Kannur town. Mangalore and Mumbai can be accessed on the northern side and Cochin and Thiruvananthapuram can be accessed on the southern side. The road to the east of Iritty connects to Mysore and Bangalore. The nearest railway station is Thalassery towards Calicut and Kannur railway station towards Mangalore. The nearest airport is Kannur International Airport.
