= State Highway 36 (Kerala) =

Highway in Kerala, India

State Highway 36
- Taliparamba -Iritty road
- SH 36 highlighted in red

Route information
- Maintained by Kerala Public Works Department
- Length: 46.5 km (28.9 mi)

Major junctions
- West end: NH 66 in Taliparamba
- East end: SH 30 in Iritty

Location
- Country: India
- State: Kerala
- Districts: Kannur

Highway system
- Roads in India; Expressways; National; State; Asian; State Highways in Kerala
← SH 34	→ SH 37

State Highway 36 (SH 36) is a state highway in Kerala, India that starts in Taliparamba and ends in Iritty. The highway is 46.5 km long. This road links interstate highway between Kannur district and Kodagu district.

== Route map ==
(Joins NH 66) Chiravakk - Kurumathur - Sreekandapuram - Irikkur - Padiyoor - Iritty (Joins SH 30)

== See also ==
- Roads in Kerala
- List of state highways in Kerala
