= Irikkur =

- Census Town
- Irikkur Junction

- Location in Kerala, India Irikkur (India)
- Coordinates: 11.9700°N 75.5700°E
- Country: India
- State: Kerala
- District: Kannur
- Taluk: Taliparamba

Government
  - Body: Grama panchayat
  - MLA: Sajeev Joseph

Area
  - Total: 11.38 km^{2} (4.39 sq mi)
- Elevation: 26 m (85 ft)

Population (2011)
  - Total: 13,820
  - Density: 1,214/km^{2} (3,145/sq mi)

Languages
  - Official: Malayalam, English
- Time zone: UTC+5:30 (IST)
- Postal code: 670593
- Telephone code: 04982
- ISO 3166 code: IN-KL
- Vehicle registration: KL 59
- Assembly constituency: Irikkur
- Lok Sabha constituency: Kannur

Irikkur

Irikkur is a town and grama panchayat in Kannur District of Kerala state, India.

== Location ==
Irikkur is located on State Highway 36 between the towns of Taliparamba and Iritty, and is directly accessible from Kannur, Mattanur, and Thalassery. It lies about 30 km (19 mi) northeast of Kannur, 30 km (19 mi) southeast of Taliparamba, 36 km (22 mi) north of Thalassery, 17 km (11 mi) west of Iritty and 10 km (6.2 mi) north of Mattanur.

The town is situated on the banks of the Bavali River (locally known as Irikkur River/Ayippuzha), a major tributary of the Valapattanam River.

== History ==
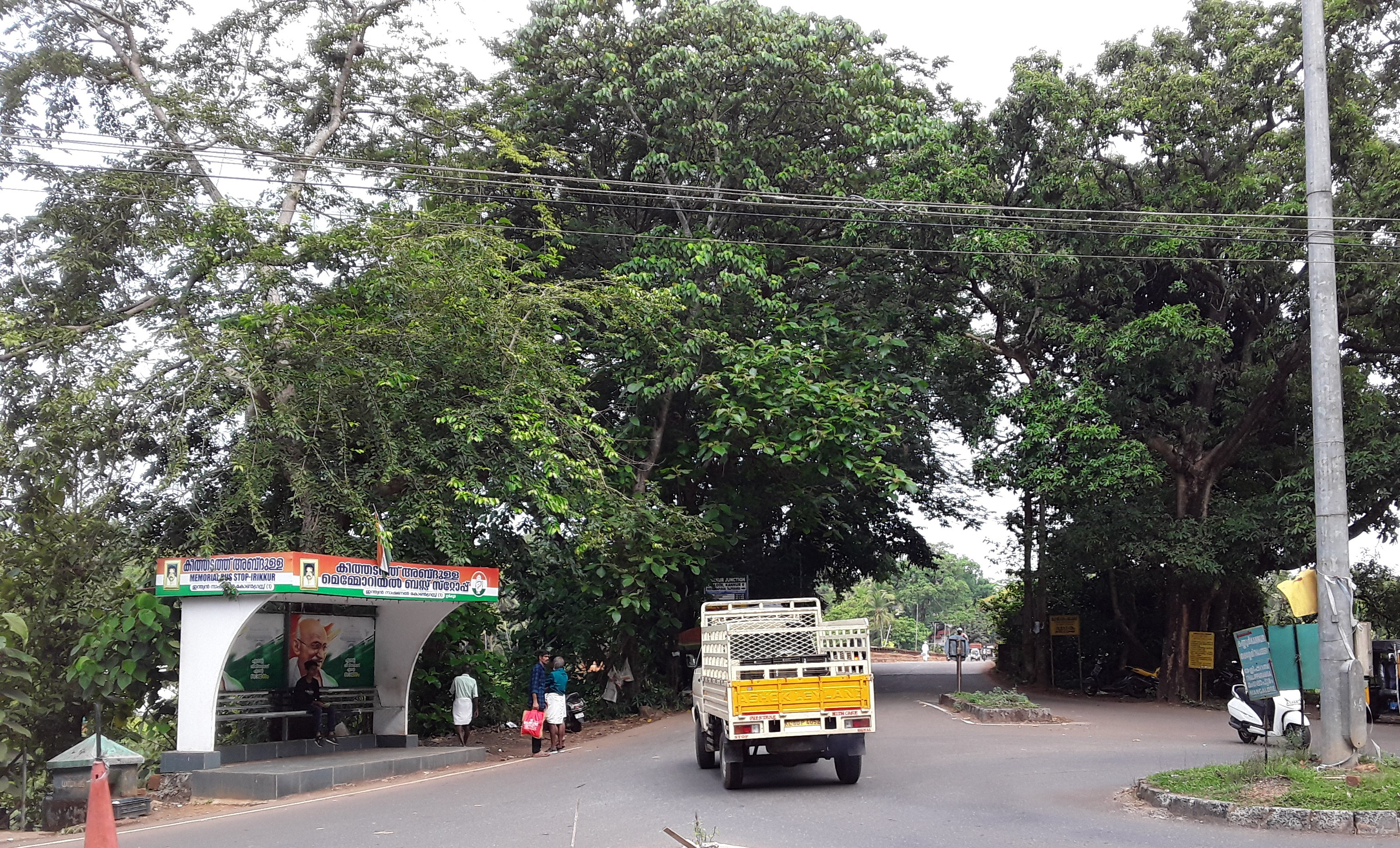
A bus stop in Irikkur

Irikkur has historic and commercial importance, and is one of the largest Muslim-majority towns (76%) in the Kannur district and lies on the banks of the Irikkur River, locally known as the "Ayippuzha". This river was the geographical border of the former Kottayam Kingdom ruled by Kerala Varma Pazhassi Raja.

== Administration ==
Irikkur Grama Panchayat consists of 14 wards. The current ruling party is UDF.

Irikkur Block Panchayat comprises 8 Grama Panchayats with 15 wards. Panchayats like Eruvessi, Payyavoor, Ulikkal, Padiyoor-Kalliad, Kuttiattoor, Mayyil, Malapattam and Irikkur are part of it.

Irikkur is one among the assembly constituencies in Kerala. Irikkur Assembly constituency is politically a part of the Kannur Lok Sabha constituency. The current MLA is Sajeev Joseph under the UDF party.

== Law and Order ==
The Panchayat comes under the jurisdiction of the Irikkur police station, established on 1 January 1955. Before becoming a full-fledged station, it was an outpost of the Taliparamba police station.

Irikkur has a Grama Nyayalaya, or village court, for easy access to the judicial system in the rural areas.

== Demographics ==
As of the 2011 Census, Irikkur had a population of 13,820, of which 6,690 are males and 7,130 are females. Irikkur Census Town has an area of 11.38 km^{2} (4.39 sq mi), houses 2,327 families, and supplies basic amenities like water and sewerage. It is also authorized to build roads within Census Town limits and impose taxes on properties under its jurisdiction.

In Irikkur, the sex ratio is 1.066 females per male, below the state average of 1.084. Moreover, the child sex ratio is 0.991, compared to the Kerala state average of 0.964. The literacy rate of Irikkur is 92.03%, lower than the state average of 94.00%. In Irikkur, male literacy is 96.30%, while the female literacy rate is 88.08%.

== Transportation ==
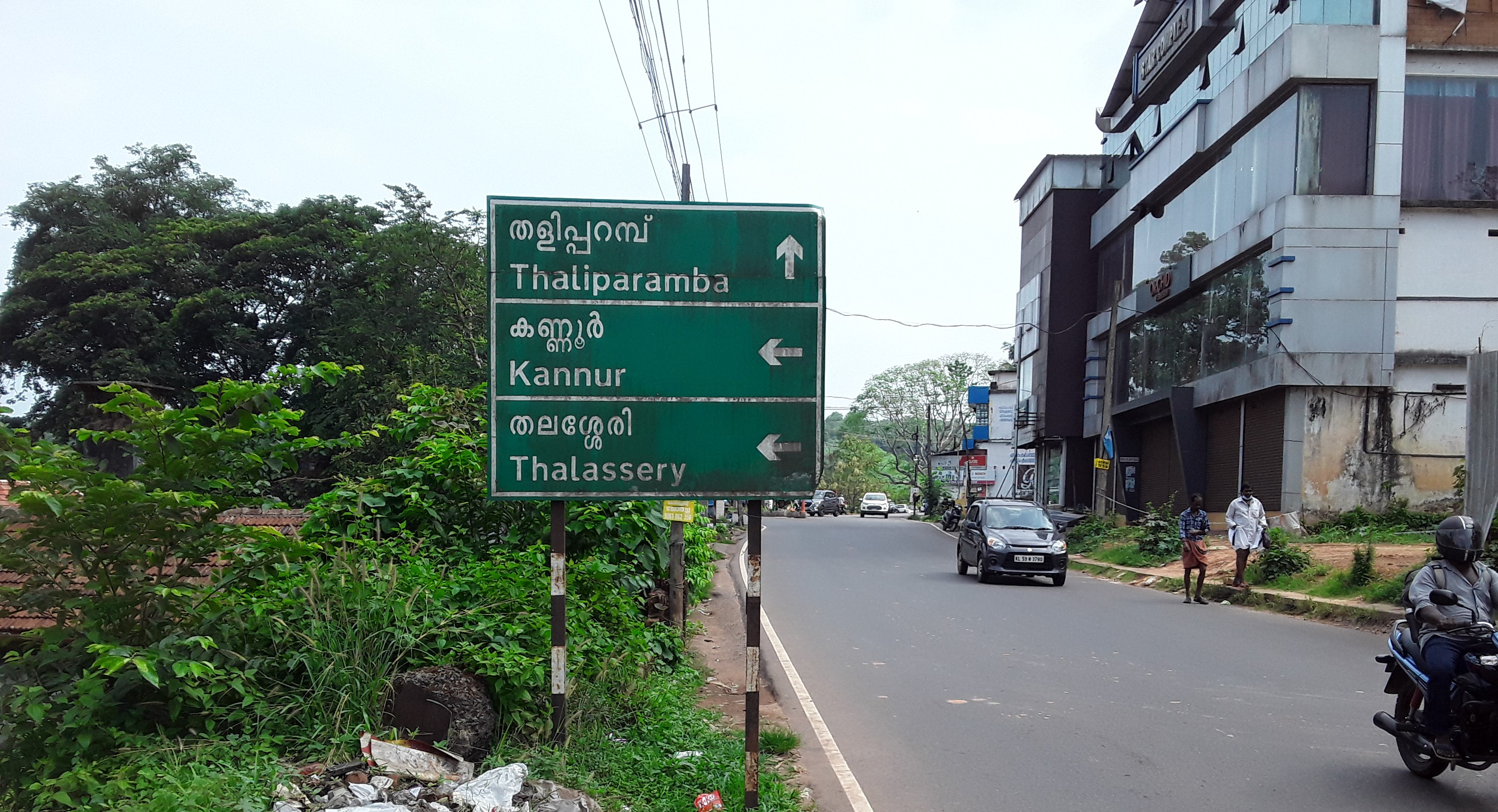
Irikkur town

National Highway (NH 66) passes through the town of Taliparamba. Mangalore and Mumbai can be accessed on the northern side, and Cochin and Thiruvananthapuram can be accessed on the southern side. State Highway (SH 36) passes through Irikkur town and connects with Taliparamba and Iritty. The road towards the east of Iritty connects to Mysore and Bangalore.

The nearest railway station is Kannur on the Shoranur-Mangalore Section line. There are airports at Mangalore and Kannur. The Kannur International Airport (KIAL), located at Mattannur is the nearest airport, which is 13 km (8.1 mi) away.

== Geography ==
Irikkur is located at 11.97°N 75.57°E. It has an average elevation of 60 m (200 ft).

== Tourism ==
Irikkur Assembly constituency has a major role in tourism in the Kannur district, as it covers mainly hilly regions bordering the Western Ghats with a serene environment. Paithalmala, Palakkayam thattu, Kanjirakolli, and Kappimala are the main tourist destinations in the Irikkur constituency that enhance the huge inflow of tourists. To transform Irikkur into Malabar's tourism hotspot, infrastructure development and accommodation facilities are being prioritized, driven by investor and tourism conferences aimed at attracting global investment.

== Educational Institutions ==
- SIBGA Institute of Advanced Studies, Irikkur
- Govt HSS, Irikkur
- Rahmaniya Orphanage HSS, Irikkur

== Religion ==
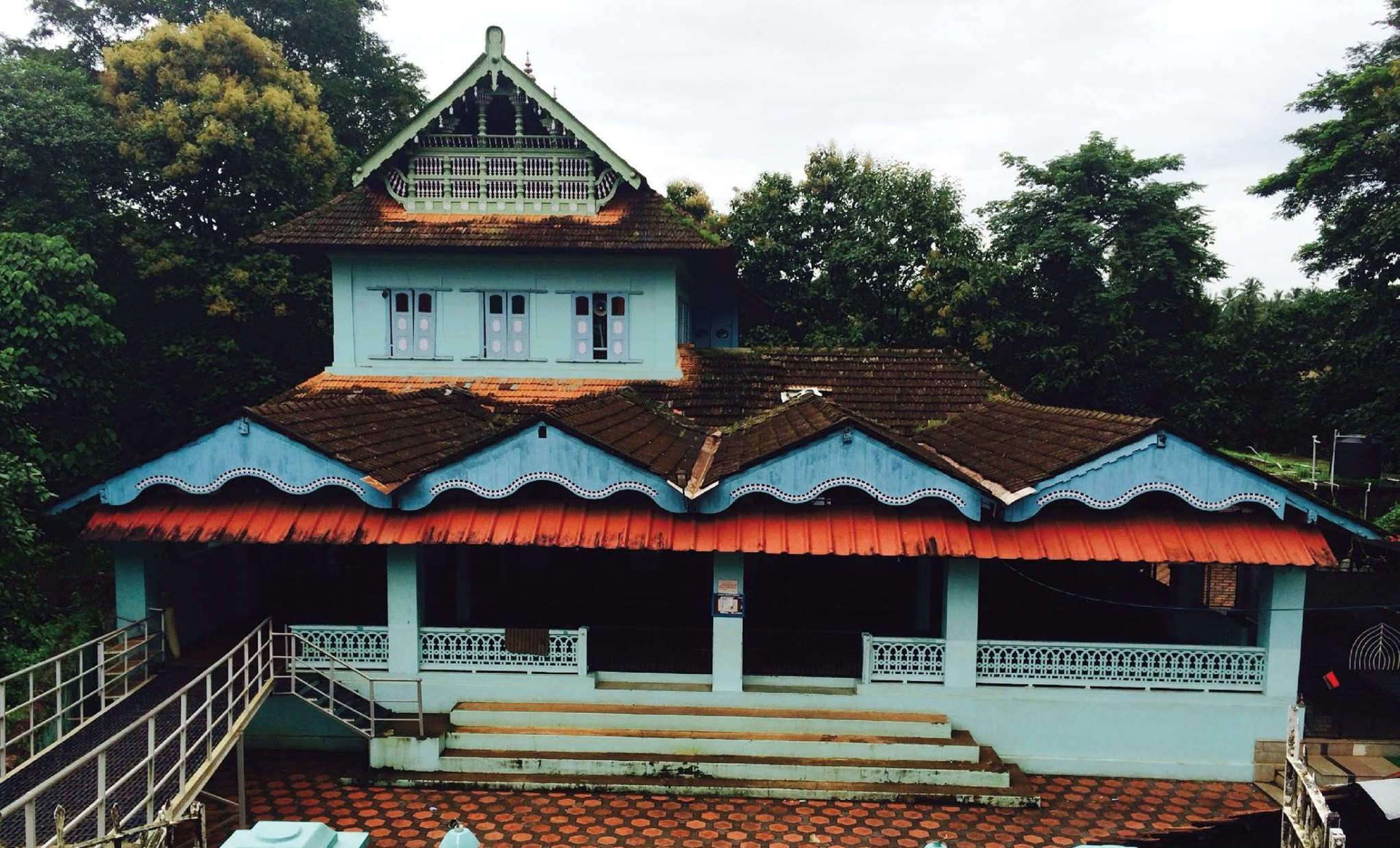
Irikkur Juma Masjidh is riverside prayer facility

Approximately 76% of the population consists of Muslims

- Mamanikkunn temple, one of the famous Hindu temples of Kerala.
- 20 mosques, out of which allow to pray
- A Christian seminary

== Politics ==
Irikkur assembly constituency is part of the Kannur Lok Sabha constituency. The current MLA of Irikkur is Sajeev Joseph from INC who won in the 2021 Kerala Legislative Assembly election with a vote share of 50.33%.
