= Padiyoor =

Village in Kerala, India

Padiyoor Padiyur
- Town
- Location in Kerala, India Padiyoor (India)
- Coordinates: 11°58′48″N 75°35′58″E
- Country: India
- State: Kerala
- District: Kannur
- Taluk: Iritty

Government
  - Type: Panchayati raj (India)
  - Body: Padiyoor-Kalliad Grama Panchayat

Area
  - Total: 25.44 km^{2} (9.82 sq mi)

Population (2011)
  - Total: 12,114
  - Density: 476.2/km^{2} (1,233/sq mi)

Languages
  - Official: Malayalam, English
- Time zone: UTC+5:30 (IST)
- PIN: 670703
- Telephone code: 0460
- ISO 3166 code: IN-KL
- Vehicle registration: KL-78
- Nearest city: Iritty
- Niyamasabha constituency: Mattanur
- Lok Sabha constituency: Kannur
- Climate: Typical Kerala Climate (Köppen)

Padiyoor is a small town in Kannur district of Kerala state, India. Padiyoor village is part of Padiyoor-Kalliad Grama Panchayat in Iritty taluk.

== Location ==
Padiyoor is located on SH 36 between Iritty and Irikkur towns. It is about 7 km from Iritty and 10 km from Irikkur. Padiyoor town is located near the reservoir of Pazhassi Dam. Padiyoor Town is the center of all Panchayat activities and the Panchayat Headquarters is situated here.

== Demographics ==
As of 2011 Census, Padiyoor village had total population of 12,144 where 5,936 are males and 6,178 are females. Padiyoor village spreads over 25.44 km^{2} (9.82 sq mi) area with 2,758 families residing in it. The sex ratio of Padiyoor was 1,041 lower than state average of 1,084. Population in the age group of 0-9 was 1,214 (10% of total) which constitutes 634 males and 580 females. Padiyoor had overall literacy of 93.4% where male literacy stands at 96.7% and female literacy was 90.8%.

== Transportation ==
The national highway passes through Taliparamba town. Mangalore and Mumbai can be accessed on the northern side and Cochin and Thiruvananthapuram can be accessed on the southern side. The road to the east connects to Mysore and Bangalore. The nearest railway station is Kannur on Mangalore-Palakkad line. There are airports at Kannur and Calicut.

== Notable people ==
- Sudhi Anna, film director
