= Iritty =

- Municipality
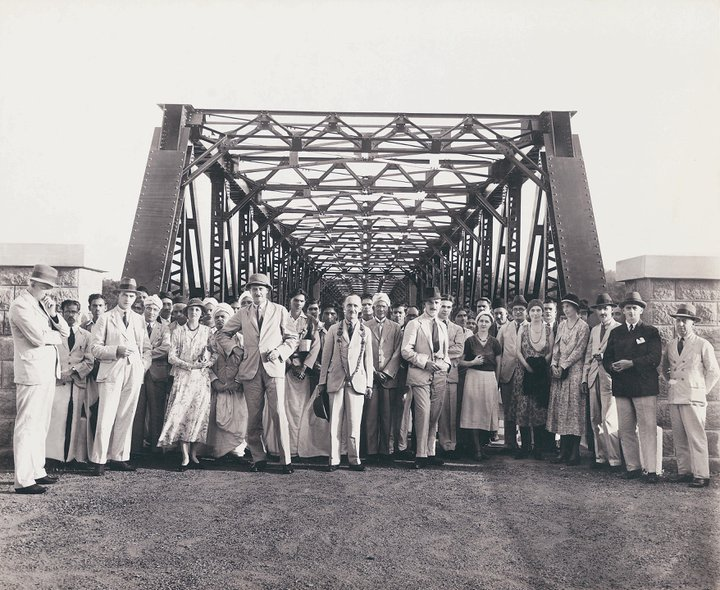
- View of Iritty Bridge built in 1933

- Location in Kerala, India Iritty (India)
- Coordinates: 11.9819°N 75.6703°E
- Country: India
- State: Kerala
- District: Kannur
- Municipality: 2015
- Taluk: Iritty

Government
  - Type: Municipal Council
  - Municipal Chairman: V. Vinod Kumar
  - Deputy Superintendent of Police: Yogesh Mandhaiya IPS

Area
  - Total: 45.84 km^{2} (17.70 sq mi)
- Elevation: 39 m (128 ft)

Population (2011)
  - Total: 40,369
  - Density: 880.7/km^{2} (2,281/sq mi)

Languages
  - Official: Malayalam, English
- Time zone: UTC+5:30 (IST)
- Postal code: 670703
- Telephone code: 91 (0)490
- ISO 3166 code: IN-KL
- Vehicle registration: KL-78
- Sex ratio: 1066 ♂/♀
- Nearest city: Kannur
- Assembly constituency: Peravoor
- Lok Sabha constituency: Kannur

Iritty is a municipality and taluk in Kannur district of Kerala state, India. The town is the main market place for the farmer communities in the surrounding regions. Iritty is at a distance of 20 km (12 mi) from Kannur International Airport and one among five taluks in Kannur district. Iritty is one of the major towns that lies between Coorg and Kannur International Airport near Mattanur.

== Location ==
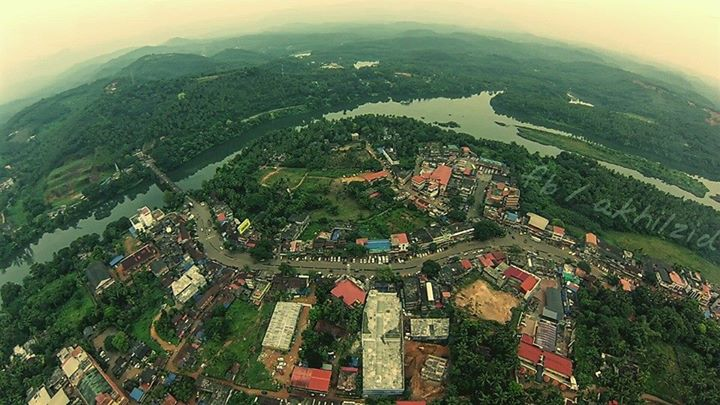
A heliCam view of Iritty

Iritty is located on the banks of Bavali river, which originates from the Wayanad passes. Iritty is situated on the Thalassery-Coorg-Mysore highway and State Highway 30 (Kerala) between Mattanur and Virajpet. Some of the nearby smaller towns are Padiyoor, Blathur, Peravoor, Kakkayangad, Aralam, Keezhppally, Vallithode, Karikkottakary, Angadikadavu, Anappanthy, Edoor, Ulikkal, Vattiyamthode, Mattara, Manikkadavu, Kilyianthara, Punnad, Charal, Edapuzha, Uruppumkutti, Vilakkode and Chavassery.

Aralam Wildlife Sanctuary is situated 8 kilometres (5 mi) from Iritty.

== Geography ==
Iritty is surrounded by hills. The Iritty Puzha (Iritty River). There is a steel girder bridge, built in 1933, over the river. Pazhassi Dam, almost 10 km from the town, provides irrigation.

=== Steel bridge ===
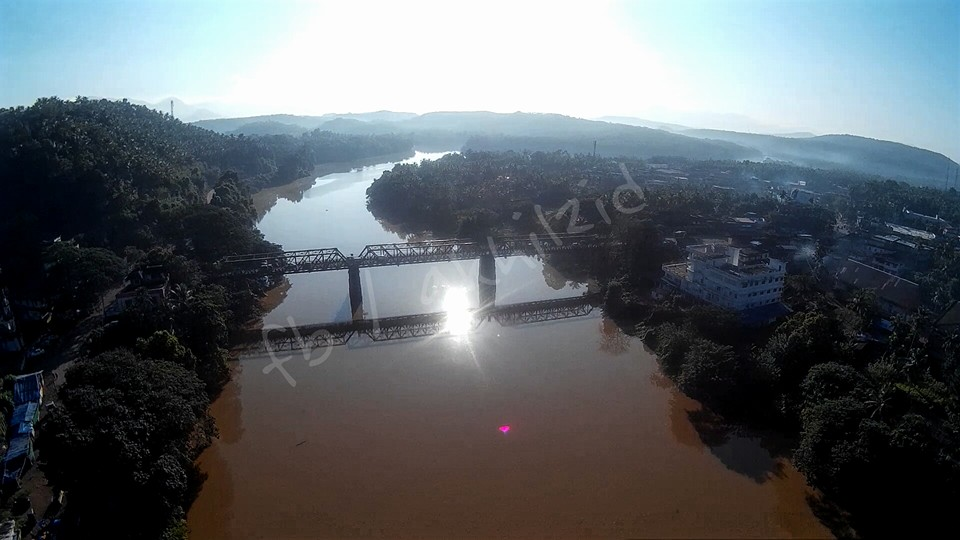
Iritty Bridge Built in 1933

The steel bridge in Iritty is a 10-ton bridge constructed in 1933 by the British authorities to connect the towns of Kodagu and Thalassery. It was designed by George Anderson of the Institution of Civil Engineers. A July 2015 death of a man after being accidentally wedged between the handrail and a private bus raised concerns about the bridge's age.

== Administration ==
Iritty was initially part of Keezhur-Chavassery Panchayat and upgraded to a Municipality on 1 November 2015. The Municipal town is divided into 34 wards. V Vinod Kumar is the present municipal chairman of Iritty. The current ruling party of Iritty Municipality is LDF.

Iritty Municipality is a part of Peravoor Assembly Constituency under Kannur Loksabha Constituency.

Iritty established as a Taluk headquarters since March 2013 when Kerala government declared new taluks for the state. Iritty taluk falls under Thalassery Revenue division.

=== Villages in Iritty Taluk ===
Iritty Taluk has 20 villages:

- Aralam, Ayyankunnu, Chavasseri and Kalliad
- Kanichar, Karikkottakari, Keezhur and Kelakam
- Kolari, Kottiyoor, Manathana and Muzhakkunnu
- Nuchiyad, Padiyoor, Payam and Pazhassi
- Thillankeri, Vayathur, Vellarvalli and Vilamana

== Law and Order ==
The municipality comes under the jurisdiction of Iritty police station, established on 11 November 1952. Before becoming a full fledged station, it was an outpost of Mattanur police station.

Iritty Sub Division was formed on 09-02-2005 by merging areas from Panur Sub Division (previously under Thalassery). Later, when Kannur police district split into city and rural, Iritty subdivision was split into Peravoor and the current Iritty subdivisions. The subdivision consists of 5 police stations under its jurisdiction limits like Aralam, Karikkottakary, Ulikkal, Irikkur and Iritty. This subdivision shares its eastern border with Karnataka state, northern border with Taliparamba subdivision, western border with Kannur city district police and southern border with Peravoor subdivision.

Iritty has a Grama Nyayalaya or village court situated at Payam for easy access to the judicial system in the rural areas.

== Climate ==
Iritty has a tropical monsoon climate (Am) with little to no rainfall from December to March and heavy to extremely heavy rainfall from April to November.

Climate data for Iritty
Month	Jan	Feb	Mar	Apr	May	Jun	Jul	Aug	Sep	Oct	Nov	Dec	Year
Mean daily maximum °C (°F)	31.6 (88.9)	32.5 (90.5)	33.6 (92.5)	33.9 (93.0)	33.2 (91.8)	29.9 (85.8)	28.6 (83.5)	29.0 (84.2)	29.7 (85.5)	30.5 (86.9)	31.0 (87.8)	31.2 (88.2)	31.2 (88.2)
Daily mean °C (°F)	26.5 (79.7)	27.5 (81.5)	28.9 (84.0)	29.8 (85.6)	29.4 (84.9)	26.9 (80.4)	26.0 (78.8)	26.2 (79.2)	26.6 (79.9)	27.0 (80.6)	26.9 (80.4)	26.3 (79.3)	27.3 (81.2)
Mean daily minimum °C (°F)	21.4 (70.5)	22.6 (72.7)	24.3 (75.7)	25.7 (78.3)	25.6 (78.1)	23.9 (75.0)	23.4 (74.1)	23.5 (74.3)	23.5 (74.3)	23.6 (74.5)	22.9 (73.2)	21.5 (70.7)	23.5 (74.3)
Average precipitation mm (inches)	3 (0.1)	4 (0.2)	12 (0.5)	85 (3.3)	283 (11.1)	867 (34.1)	1,332 (52.4)	711 (28.0)	329 (13.0)	279 (11.0)	106 (4.2)	23 (0.9)	4,034 (158.8)

== Educational Institutions ==
=== Colleges ===
- EMS Memorial College of Applied Science, Iritty
- Sree Narayana Guru College of Arts & Science College, Iritty
- Mahatma Gandhi College, Iritty

=== Schools ===
- Iritty HSS, Keezhur
- St. John Baptist E.M. HSS, Kadathumkadavu
- GHSS, Chavassery
- GUPS, Uliyil
- Meethala Punnad UP School
- Keezhur V.UP School

== Transportation ==
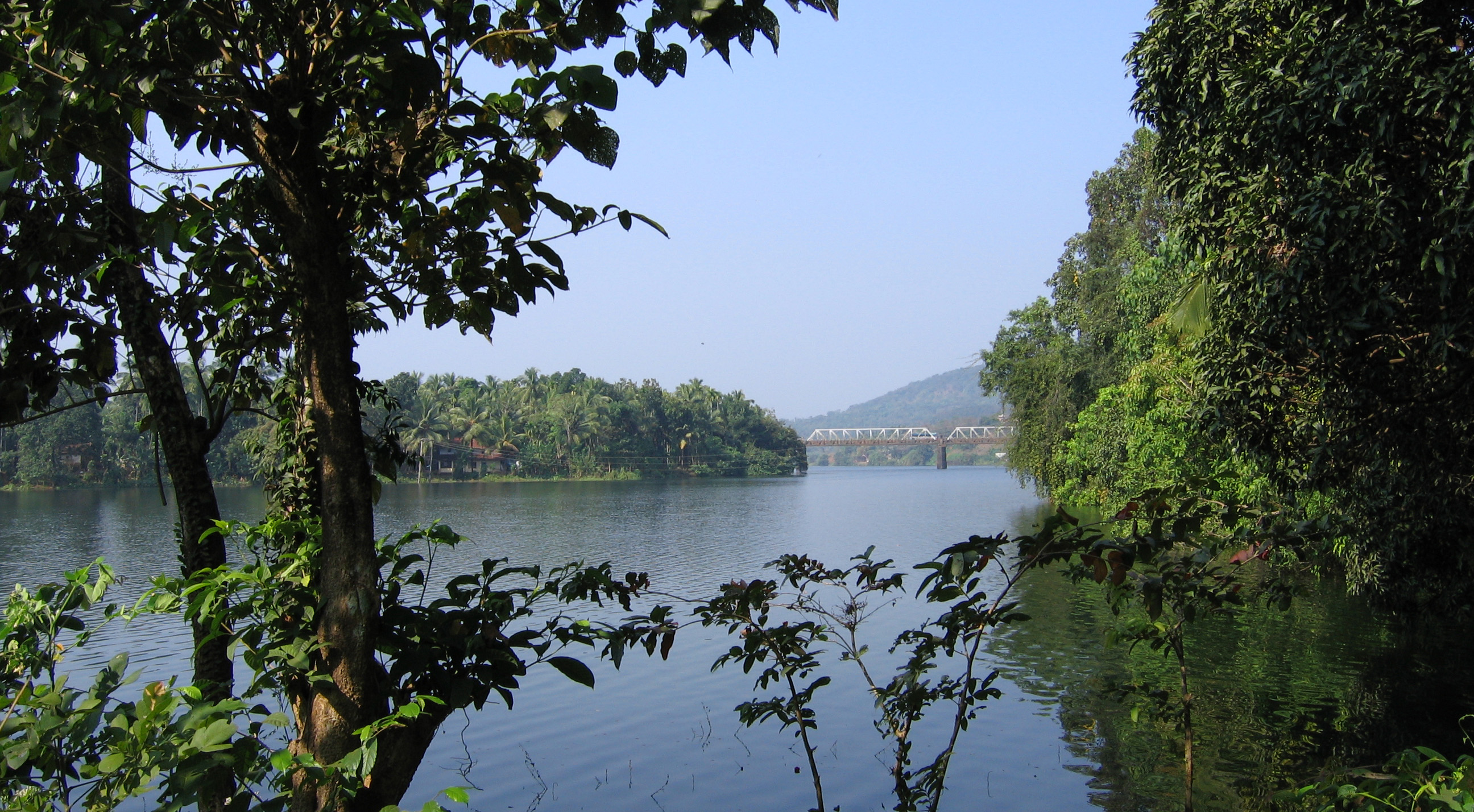
A view of Iritty Bridge

Iritty lies at an equal distance from the nearby cities of Kannur, Thalassery, Mahe, Taliparamba and Virajpet (Karnataka State). The proposed Kannur Mysore National Highway or SH 30 passes through Iritty connecting Thalassery, Mattanur Airport and Kodagu. This was initially called the TC Road by the British. This highway is used by interstate bus services plying to Madikeri, Mysore and Bangalore.

SH 36 connects Iritty with Taliparamba that gives access to other towns like Irikkur and Sreekandapuram.

Keezhur is the starting point of Iritty town. This place is well-connected by road from both Kannur and Thalassery. There are frequent buses from Iritty and to both these places and to several places across Kerala including Kottayam, Cochin (Ernakulam), Mangalore, Kasaragod, Panathur, Kanhangad, Cherupuzha, Wayanad and Kozhikode. There is no railway line, with the nearest railway stations at Kannur and Thalassery. The nearest airport is Kannur International Airport, at Mattannur is located 19.5 km south-west of Iritty.

== Commerce ==
Iritty is one of the major towns of the Kannur district. Nearby villages produce cash crops and plantation crops, making Iritty a major commercial town. Iritty is famous for cash crops such as pepper, rubber and cashew nuts, some of which are sold under regional brands in various auction houses and commodities markets.

Iritty is primarily a trading town. Iritty is headquarters to several State Government offices. Most of these offices have jurisdiction over nearby towns like Mattanur and Peravoor.

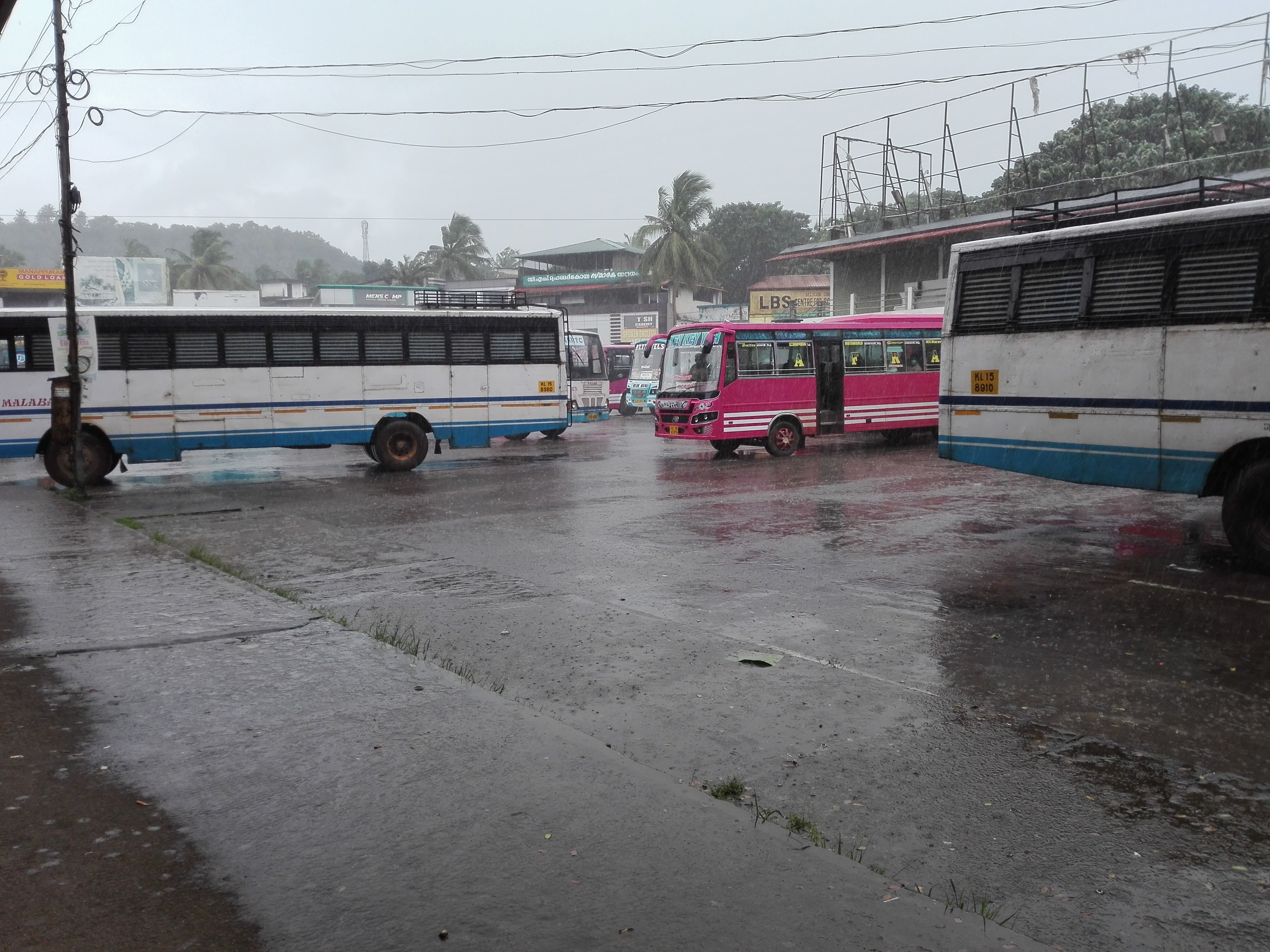
Iritty bus stand

== Religion ==
The following places provide religious services to Iritty:

- St. George Church Puravayal
- St. Mary's Forane Church, Edoor
- St. Joseph's Church Iritty
- Sacred Heart Church,Angadikadavu
- Assemblies of God in India, Veerpad

InfantJesus Church, Ulikkal St.Sebastian forona Church Nellickampoyil

== Notable people ==
- Tintu Luka, athlete
- Nivetha Thomas, actress
- Vinoy Thomas, writer
- Blesson Thomas, music director, film director
- Joseph Pamplany, catholic bishop
- V. Sivadasan, politician
