= Malabar Migration =

Migration of Christians within Kerala, India

Malabar Migration refers to the large-scale migration of Malayalis from Northern Travancore mostly Saint Thomas Christians (present day Southern and Central Kerala) to Northern Kerala (Malabar and Kanara) in the 20th century. Driven by agrarian pressures, food scarcity this was done by family heads at the time to ensure land for their heirs, for which they were facing shortages due to increasing real estate rates of Southern Kerala at the time.

== History ==
The World War I put immense Population pressure and scarcity on princely state of Travancore. Efforts like Kayal reclamation at Kuttanad did not alleviate the scarcity. In early 1920's clearing forest lands and expansion of agriculture gained traction as an alternative and the first set of migration happened from Kottayam to Upputhara in 1918 followed by waves of migration to Devikulam and Peermade taluks. The migrants were mostly Christians and Ezhavas. The migration to Malabar started in following years. War effort from British Raj and the railway connection towards south from Malabar District as Shoranur–Cochin railway line proved instrumental for accelerating migration.

The World War II which followed and Famine in Travancore during World War II put further stress on food availability. This led to mass migration from Travancore to Malabar. The sizeable fraction of migrants were Saint Thomas Christians followed by Ezhavas. There were migration of Nairs to Panathur and nearby regions also.

== Knanaya Malabar Migration( Rajapuram & Madampam) ==
The migration started from early decades of the 20th century and continued well into the 1970s and 1980s. The first organized migration to Malabar was envisaged by the Syro-Malabar Catholic Archeparchy of Kottayam, Knanaya Catholic under the direction of the then Bishop Mar Alexander Chulaparambil in 1943. Two settlements or colonies were started. The first was to Rajapuram Colony in the present Kasargod District on February 2, 1943. A group of 72 selected families from Kidangoor, Koodalloor, Punnathura and Pala came by train to Kanhangad and proceeded to their destinations at Chullikara, Rajapuram, Kallar and Malakkallu. The second settlement was to Madampam, 30 Kilometers East of Kannur on March 8, 1943. 100 families mostly from Meenachil Taluk traveled by train to Kannur and settled at Madampam and Payyavoor. The settlement was named after the bishop, Alexnagar colony, in the present Kannur District. The idea of organized migration was envisaged and presented to the Bishop by Professor Joseph Kandoth, who was then a professor at the St. Alosius College in Manglore. This migration had a significant demographic and social impact as the Christian population of Malabar increased 15-fold from 31,191 in 1931 to 442,510 in 1971.

== After effects ==
Central Travancore had experienced a steep increase in population in the early 20th century and pressure on arable land increased. At the same time people realized the potential in the large uncultivated lands in the northern regions called Malabar which was then part of Madras Province under British Rule. Migration initially started in trickles. Land was bought from the local rulers and plantations were set up. Against many odds, the community thrived, thereby attracting more migrants and by the 1950s had reached its peak.

The Archeparchy of Tellicherry was set up in 1950's following the demographic shift. The migration was so significant that nearly 21.3% of total population of Wayanad district presently is constituted by Christians,predominantly Syro-Malabar Nasranis.

== Communities that migrated and major settlements ==
The vast majority of the migrants were Syrian Christians, mainly (Syrian Malabar Nasrani) from erstwhile Travancore state. The migrants were mostly from present day Kottayam district, Idukki district and Ernakulam district regions such as Pala, Changanasserry, Kanjirapally, Kuravilangad, Thodupuzha, Kothamangalam, Muvattupuzha etc. Settlements were established in various hill areas of Malabar region (north Kerala) including in the following districts of current Kerala (Some key migration centres also mentioned):

- Kasargod - Rajapuram, Kolichal, Panathady, Panathur, Malakkallu, Malom, Chittarikkal, Balal, Vellarikund
- Kannur - Alakode, Manakadavu, Udayagiri, Madampam, Payyavoor, Chemperi, Chempanthotty, Cherupuzha, Kudianmala, Iritty, Ulikkal, Manikkadavu, Peravoor, Kanichar, Kelakam
- Calicut - Thiruvambady, Kodenchery, Thottilpalam, Kuttiyadi, Maruthonkara,Chempanoda, Koorachundu, Kattippara, Thamarassery, Thottumukkam, Koodaranji, Chakkittapara, Vilangad.
- Wayanad - Perikkallur, Thettamala, Pulpally, Mananthavady, Nadavayal
- Malappuram - Nilambur Taluk (Nilambur and its surrounding places)
- Palakkad - Mannarkkad, Vadakkenchery
- Thrissur - especially in the hill tracts near Vellikulangara

Huge tracts of uncultivated forest and waste land were converted into farms and plantations during this period. The supportive role of Syro-Malabar Catholic Church is well acknowledged as they supported this young community with churches, schools, hospitals and other infrastructure.

The migration has resulted in hundreds of thousands of people moving to these lands. As a result, the demography of Malabar has been altered significantly especially in the eastern hill region. The share of Christians which was insignificant in the 1920s grew to substantial share by the 1970s in the settlement area.

== See also ==
- Archeparchy of Thalassery
- Eparchy of Mananthavady
- List of Syrian Malabar Nasranis
- Syrian church in India
- Saint Thomas Christians
- Syro-Malabar Catholic Archeparchy of Kottayam
