= Iritty taluk =

Taluka in Kerala, India

- Taluk
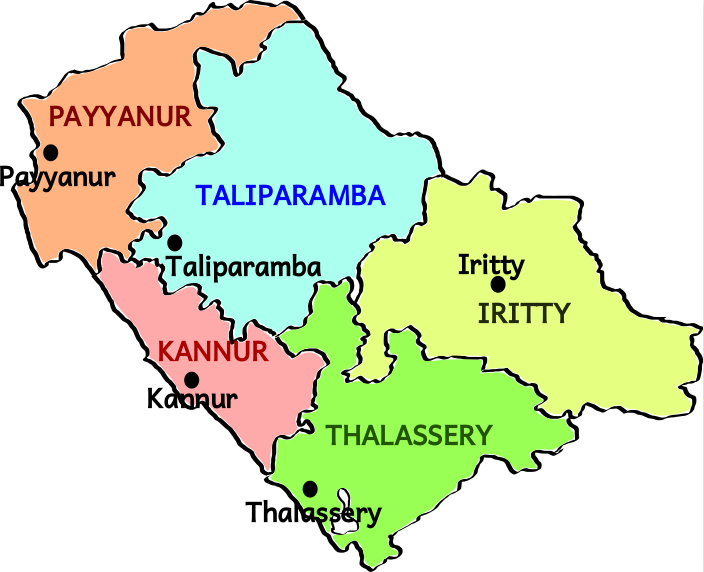
- Taluks of Kannur

- Location in Kerala, India Iritty taluk (India)
- Coordinates: 11.9819°N 75.6703°E
- Country: India
- State: Kerala
- District: Kannur
- Established: March 2013

Government
  - Type: Taluk

Area
  - Total: 836.08 km^{2} (322.81 sq mi)

Population
  - Total: 342,118
  - Density: 409.19/km^{2} (1,059.8/sq mi)

Languages
  - Official: Malayalam, English
- Time zone: UTC+5:30 (IST)
- PIN: 670xxx
- Telephone code: 0498,0490
- Vehicle registration: KL 78
- Lok Sabha constituency: Kannur
- Vidhan Sabha constituency: Peravoor, Irikkur, Mattanur

Iritty taluk is one of five taluks in Kannur district of Kerala, India. Iritty was established as a taluk in March 2013 when UDF government declared new 12 taluks for the state. Iritty taluk borders with Taliparamba taluk in the north, Thalassery taluk in the west, Wayanad district in south and Karnataka state in east. It comprises Iritty municipality, Mattannur municipality and 11 surrounding panchayats.

== History ==
Iritty taluk was established on 9 February 2014 by bifurcating Thalassery and Taliparamba taluks. Kerala ex Chief Minister Umman Chandy inaugurated Iritty taluk in 2014. Iritty was formed as a taluk along with other taluks in Kerala which was declared by UDF government.

== Constituent villages ==
Iritty taluk comprises 20 villages.

- Aralam, Ayyankunnu, Chavassery, Kalliad
- Kanichar, Karikkottakary, Keezhur, Kelakam, Kolari
- Kottiyoor, Manathana, Muzhakkunnu, Nuchiyad
- Padiyoor, Payam, Pazhassi, Thillenkeri
- Vayathur, Vellarvelly and Vilamana,
