= Manippara =

- Village
- Location in Kerala, India Manippara (India)
- Coordinates: 12.0582646°N 75.6450594°E
- Country: India
- State: Kerala
- District: Kannur

Manippara is a village in Kannur district, Kerala, India. It is situated among the foothills of Western Ghats, near the Coorg range of Karnataka evergreen forests. It is bordered mainly by the Vayathur river to the east and Americanpara Hill to the west. The north and south boundaries are Manikkadavu and Kappana (Nuchiyad).

== Transportation ==
The national highway passes through Kannur town. Mangalore and Mumbai can be accessed on the northern side and Cochin and Thiruvananthapuram can be accessed on the southern side. The road to the east of Iritty connects to Mysore and Bangalore. The nearest railway station is Kannur on Mangalore-Palakkad line. The nearest airport is kannur international airport Mattannur
