= Peravoor Assembly constituency =

Constituency of the Kerala legislative assembly in India

Coordinates: 11.90°N 75.74°E

Peravoor
- Constituency No. 16 for the Kerala Legislative Assembly
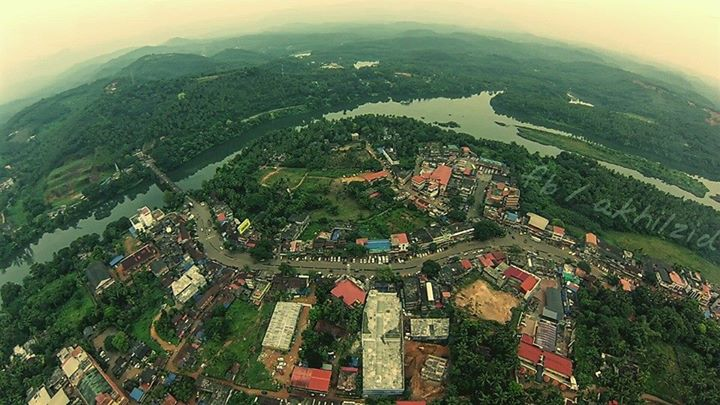
- Iritty municipal town in Peravoor Assembly constituency

Constituency details
- Country: India
- Region: South India
- State: Kerala
- District: Kannur
- Established: 1977
- Total electors: 182,384 (2026)
- Reservation: None

Member of Legislative Assembly
- 16th Kerala Legislative Assembly
- Incumbent Sunny Joseph
- Party: INC
- Alliance: UDF
- Elected year: 2026

Peravoor State assembly constituency is one of the 140 state legislative assembly constituencies in Kerala in southern India. It is also one of the seven state legislative assembly constituencies included in Kannur Lok Sabha constituency. As of the 2026 Assembly elections, the current MLA is Sunny Joseph of INC.

== Local self-governed segments ==
After The 2008 Delimitation,Kelakam And Kottiyoor was added from North Wynad.Peravoor Assembly constituency is composed of the following local self-governed segments:

| Sl no. | Name | Status (Grama panchayat/Municipality) | Taluk |
|---|---|---|---|
| 1 | Iritty | Municipality | Iritty |
| 2 | Aralam | Grama panchayat | Iritty |
| 3 | Ayyankunnu | Grama panchayat | Iritty |
| 4 | Kanichar | Grama panchayat | Iritty |
| 5 | Kelakam | Grama panchayat | Iritty |
| 6 | Kottiyoor | Grama panchayat | Iritty |
| 7 | Muzhakkunnu | Grama panchayat | Iritty |
| 8 | Payam | Grama panchayat | Iritty |
| 9 | Peravoor | Grama panchayat | Iritty |

== Members of Legislative Assembly ==
The following list contains all members of Kerala Legislative Assembly who have represented the constituency:

| Election | Niyama Sabha | Name | Party | Tenure |
|---|---|---|---|---|
| 1977 | 5th | K. P. Noorudeen | Indian National Congress | 1977 – 1980 |
| 1980 | 6th | K. P. Noorudeen | Indian National Congress | 1980 – 1982 |
| 1982 | 7th | K. P. Noorudeen | Independent | 1982 – 1987 |
| 1987 | 8th | K. P. Noorudeen | Indian National Congress | 1987 – 1991 |
| 1991 | 9th | K. P. Noorudeen | Indian National Congress | 1991 – 1996 |
| 1996 | 10th | K. T. Kunjahmed | Indian Congress | 1996 – 2001 |
| 2001 | 11th | A. D. Mustafa | Indian National Congress | 2001 – 2006 |
| 2006 | 12th | K. K. Shailaja | Communist Party of India | 2006 – 2011 |
| 2011 | 13th | Sunny Joseph | Indian National Congress | 2011 – 2016 |
| 2016 | 14th | Sunny Joseph | Indian National Congress | 2016 – 2021 |
| 2021 | 15th | Sunny Joseph | Indian National Congress | 2021 – 2026 |
| 2026 | 16th | Sunny Joseph | Indian National Congress | 2026 – present |

== Election results ==
=== 2026 ===
There were 182,384 registered voters in the Peravoor Assembly constituency for the 2026 Kerala Assembly elections.

2026 Kerala Legislative Assembly election: Peravoor
| Party | Candidate | Votes | % | ±% |
|---|---|---|---|---|
| INC | Sunny Joseph | 76,140 | 51.71 | ▲4.78 |
| CPI(M) | K. K. Shailaja | 61,687 | 41.89 | ▼2.81 |
| BDJS | Paily Vathiyattu | 8,020 | 5.45 | ▼0.99 |
| AAP | Adv. Henstion George | 431 | 0.29 | |
| NOTA | None of the above | 375 | 0.25 | ▼0.03 |
| Independent | Sunny Joseph Muthukulathel | 191 | 0.13 | |
| Independent | Sailaja A. V. | 109 | 0.07 | |
| CPI(ML)L | Aruvikkal Krishnan | 86 | 0.06 | |
| Independent | C. Shylaja | 68 | 0.05 | |
| Independent | Sunny | 66 | 0.04 | |
| Independent | Narayana Kumar | 45 | 0.03 | |
| Independent | Venugopalan C. | 26 | 0.02 | |
| Margin of victory | | 14,453 | 9.82 | ▲7.59 |
| Turnout | | 1,47,244 | | |
| INC hold | | Swing | ▲4.78 | |

| Local Body | Booths | UDF Votes | LDF Votes | NDA/BDJS Votes | Leader | Lead |
| Payam | 26 | 9,122 | 10,123 | 970 | LDF | 1,001 |
| Ayyankunnu | 19 | 8,816 | 3,938 | 426 | UDF | 4,878 |
| Iritty Municipality | 32 | 14,002 | 11,830 | 2,327 | UDF | 2,172 |
| Muzhakkunnu | 20 | 7,546 | 8,225 | 767 | LDF | 679 |
| Aralam | 26 | 11,513 | 7,746 | 695 | UDF | 3,767 |
| Kanichar | 15 | 5,833 | 4,796 | 534 | UDF | 1,037 |
| Peravoor | 23 | 9,103 | 7,925 | 1,186 | UDF | 1,178 |
| Kelakam | 15 | 5,991 | 4,145 | 594 | UDF | 1,846 |
| Kottiyoor | 7 | 2,708 | 1,709 | 364 | UDF | 999 |
| TOTAL | 183 | 74,634 | 60,437 | 7,863 | UDF | 14,197 |

=== 2021 ===
There were 1,77,249 registered voters in the constituency for the 2021 election with a polling rate of 78.07%.

2021 Kerala Legislative Assembly election: Peravoor
| Party | Candidate | Votes | % | ±% |
|---|---|---|---|---|
| INC | Sunny Joseph | 66,706 | 46.93 | ▼1.17 |
| CPI(M) | Sakeer Hussain | 63,534 | 44.70 | ▲2.55 |
| BJP | Smitha Jayamohan | 9,155 | 6.44 | ▼0.25 |
| SDPI | A.C. Jalaluddeen | 1,541 | 1.08 | ▼0.34 |
| NOTA | None of the above | 404 | 0.28 | ▼0.06 |
| Margin of victory | | 3,172 | 2.23 | ▼3.62 |
| Turnout | | 1,42,138 | 78.07 | ▼2.98 |
| Registered electors | | 177,249 | | |
| INC hold | | Swing | ▼1.17 | |

=== 2016 ===
There were 1,68,458 registered voters in the constituency for the 2016 election.

2016 Kerala Legislative Assembly election: Peravoor
| Party | Candidate | Votes | % | ±% |
|---|---|---|---|---|
| INC | Sunny Joseph | 65,659 | 48.10 | ▲0.03 |
| CPI(M) | Binoy Kurian | 57,670 | 42.25 | ▼2.87 |
| BJP | Paily Vathiattu | 9,129 | 6.69 | ▲3.22 |
| SDPI | P. K. Farookh | 1,935 | 1.42 | − |
| WPOI | Pallipram Prasannan | 513 | 0.38 | − |
| NOTA | None of the above | 458 | 0.34 | − |
| Independent | Sunny Joseph Kallarakkal | 389 | 0.28 | − |
| Independent | K. J. Joseph | 241 | 0.18 | − |
| Independent | Bijoy Kurian | 214 | 0.16 | − |
| Independent | V. D. Binto | 124 | 0.09 | − |
| Independent | Radhamani Narayana Kumar | 63 | 0.05 | ▼0.26 |
| Margin of victory | | 7,989 | 5.85 | ▲2.90 |
| Turnout | | 1,36,505 | 81.03 | ▲1.01 |
| INC hold | | Swing | ▲0.03 | |

=== 2011 ===
There were 1,45,983 registered voters in the constituency for the 2011 election.

2011 Kerala Legislative Assembly election: Peravoor
| Party | Candidate | Votes | % | ±% |
|---|---|---|---|---|
| INC | Sunny Joseph | 56,151 | 48.07 | |
| CPI(M) | K. K. Shailaja | 52,711 | 45.12 | |
| BJP | P. K. Velayudhan | 4,055 | 3.47 | |
| SDPI | P. K. Ayyappan | 1,537 | 1.32 | |
| Independent | Sunny Joseph | 903 | 0.77 | |
| Independent | A. Shylaja | 565 | 0.48 | |
| Independent | Raghavan | 526 | 0.45 | |
| Independent | Radhamani Narayana Kumar | 365 | 0.31 | |
| Margin of victory | | 3,440 | 2.95 | |
| Turnout | | 1,16,813 | 80.02 | |
| INC gain from CPI(M) | | Swing | | |

== See also ==
- Peravoor
- Kannur district
- List of constituencies of the Kerala Legislative Assembly
- 2016 Kerala Legislative Assembly election
