= Chungakkunnu =

Village in Kerala, India

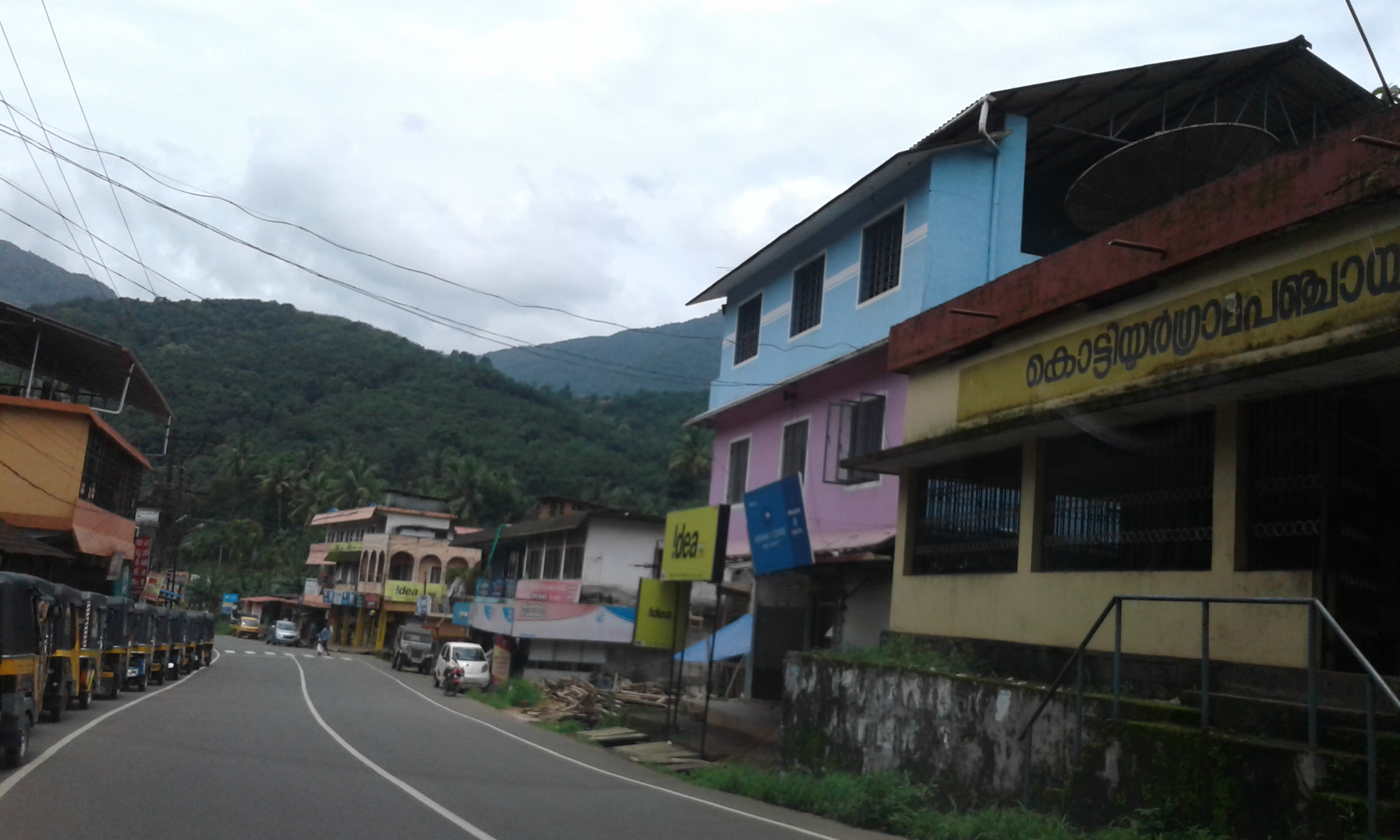
Chungakkunnu Town

Chungakkunnu is a village in Kottiyoor Grama Panchayat in Kannur district of Kerala, India. It is located on the bank of the Bavali River between Kelakam town and Hindu Pilgrim center Kottiyoor. Chungakkunnu was a famous place for settlement during the Malabar Migration. More than 2000 migrated families still live here. Chungakkunnu is well known for its timber merchants. Most of the people depend on agriculture for their livelihood. the main crops cultivated here are rubber, coconut, cashew and black pepper.

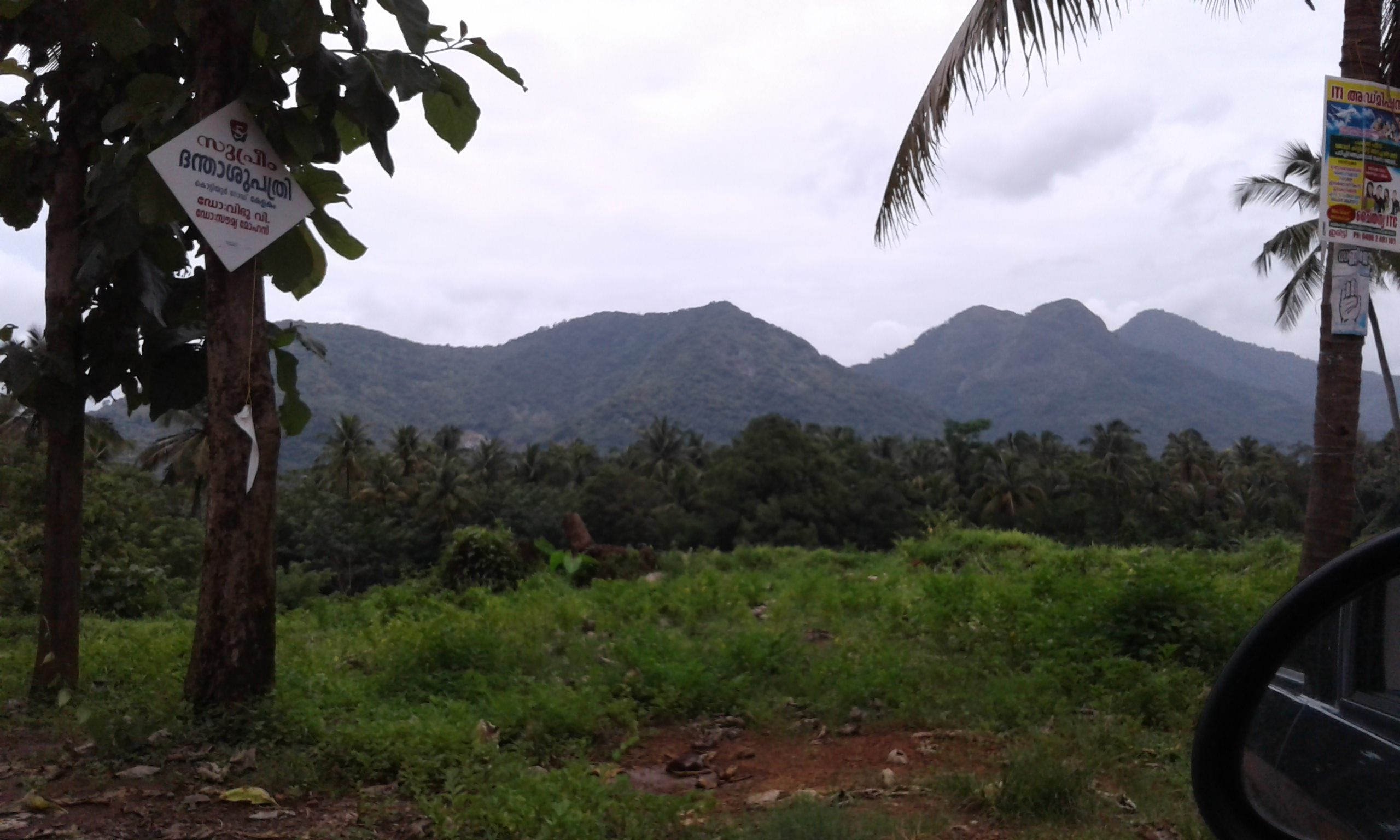
Palukachi Mala, a view from Chungakkunnu

Palukachi mala, a scenic and picturesque tourist attraction for trekking, has its entry at this town.

== Tourist attractions ==
The following destinations are nearby

- Palukachi Mala, one of the highest peaks in Kannur district.
- Kottiyoor Temple
- Palchuram waterfalls
- Fathima Matha Church
- Kottiyoor Wildlife Sanctuary
- Aralam Wildlife Sanctuary
- Palchuram Pass to Wayanad
- Kottiyoor Valley Resort

== Education ==
=== Schools near to Chungakkunnu ===
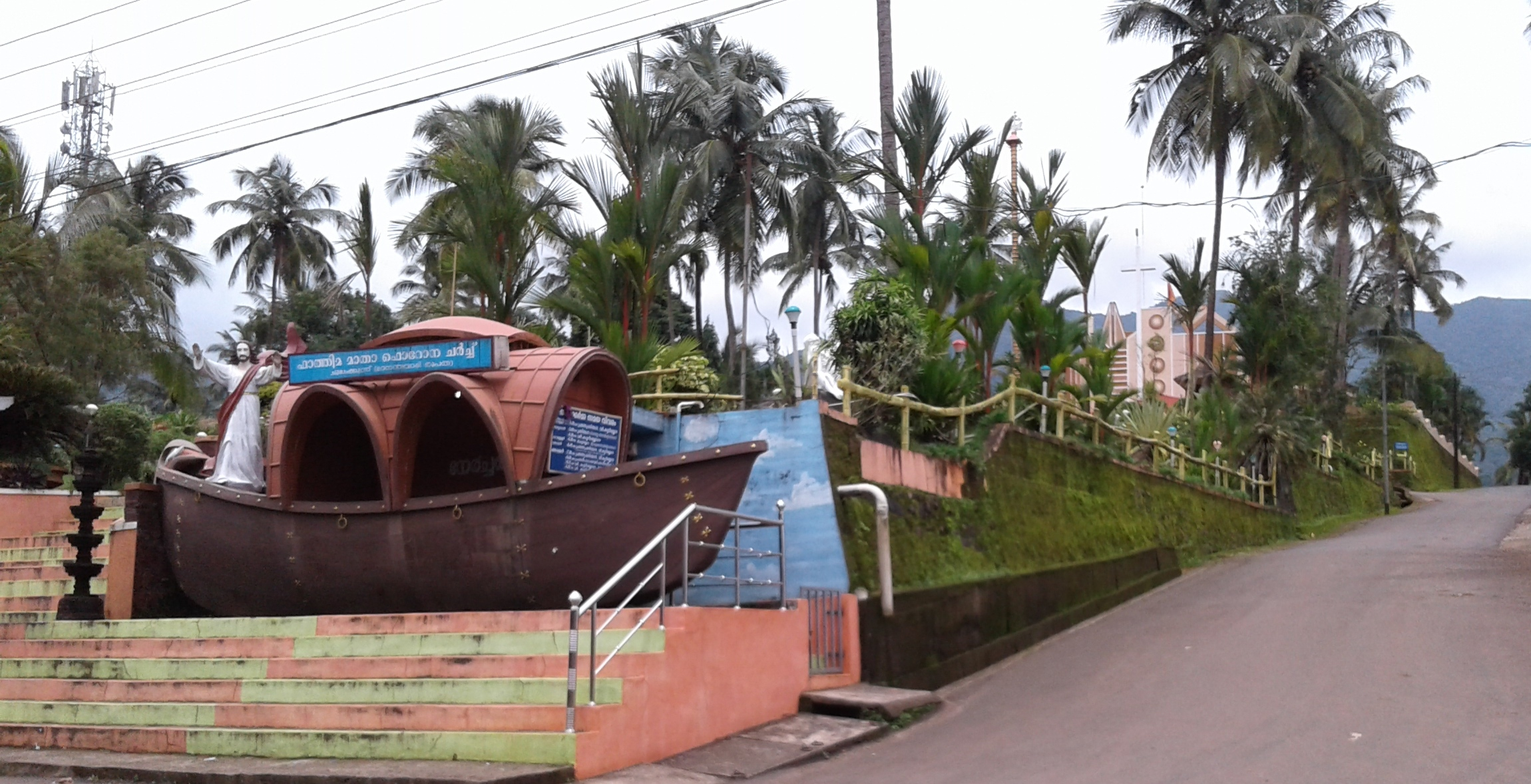
Fathima Matha Forane Church and Bethel Garden, Chungakkunnu

- Govt. Upper Primary School Chungakkunnu
- St. Mark L P School, Chungakkunnu
- Thalakkani Govt. UP School
- NSS KUP School Kottiyoor
- SN Lower Primary School Kottiyoor
- Ambayathode LP School
- IJM Higher Secondary school, Kottiyoor
- St. Thomas Higher Secondary School, Kelakam
- MGM (CBSC) High school Kelakam, India.
- Little Flower English Medium High school Kelakam

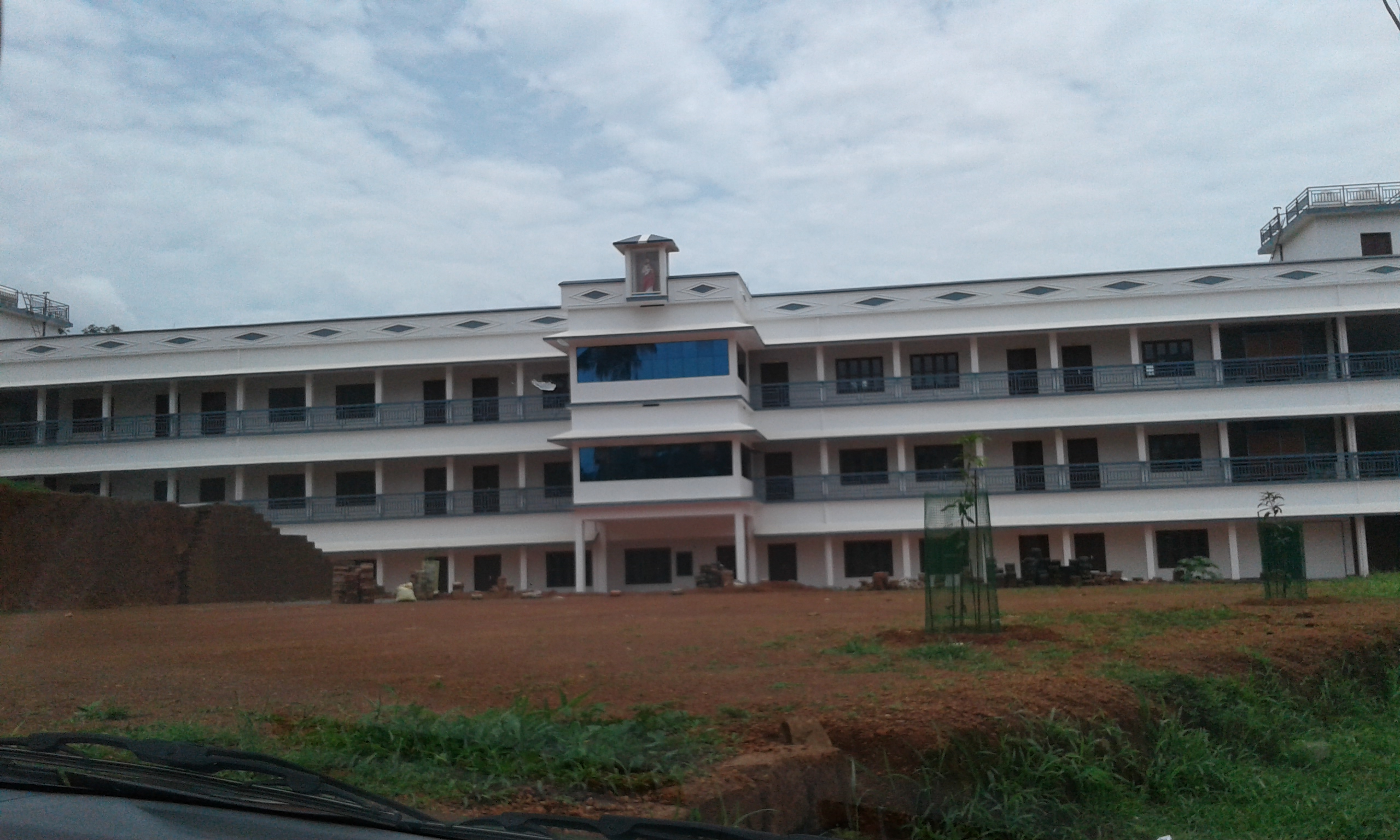
Fathima Matha Church, Catechism Center, Chungakkunnu

== Health ==
St. Camillus Hospital, Chungakkunnu
St. Mary's Clinic, Chungakkunnu
Nethravathi Clinic, Chungakkunnu
Govt. Ayurveda Dispensary, Chungakkunnu
Govt. Veterinary Hospital, Chungakkunnu

== Banks ==
Kottiyoor Service Co-Operative Bank, Chungakkunnu Branch
Vanitha co-operative Bank, Chungakkunnu Abiyo Finance Chungakkunnu
