= Payam, Kerala =

Village in Kerala, India

Payam
- village
- Location in Kerala, India Payam (India)
- Coordinates: 11.9765°N 75.7008°E
- Country: India
- State: Kerala
- District: Kannur
- Taluk: Iritty

Government
  - Type: Panchayati raj (India)
  - Body: Payam Grama Panchayat

Area
  - Total: 19.02 km^{2} (7.34 sq mi)

Population (2011)
  - Total: 15,429
  - Density: 811.2/km^{2} (2,101/sq mi)

Languages
  - Official: Malayalam, English
- Time zone: UTC+5:30 (IST)
- PIN: 670704
- Telephone code: +91 490
- ISO 3166 code: IN-KL
- Vehicle registration: KL-78

Payam is a village and Grama Panchayat in Iritty taluk of Kannur district in Indian state of Kerala.

== Demographics ==
As of 2011 Census, Payam village had a population of 15,429 with 7,425 males and 8,004 females. Payam village has an area of 19.02 km^{2} (7.34 sq mi) with 3,667 families residing in it. In Payam, 9.9% of the population was under 6 years of age. Payam had overall literacy of 94.9% where male literacy stands at 97.4% and female literacy was 92.7%. Payam Grama Panchayat consists of two revenue villages like Payam and Vilamana.

== Transportation ==
National Highway 66 passes through Thalassery town which connects Goa and Mumbai in the northern side and Kochi and Thiruvananthapuram on the southern side. Thalassery-Coorg interstate highway (SH-30) passes through Payam provides access to cities and towns of neighbouring Karnataka state. The nearest railway station is Thalassery in Shoranur-Mangalore Section under southern railway. The nearest airport is Kannur International Airport of about 23 km away.
