= Vellarvelly =

Vellarvally
- village
- Location in Kerala, India
- Coordinates: 11.8982°N 75.7080°E
- Country: India
- State: Kerala
- District: Kannur
- Taluk: Iritty

Government
  - Body: Peravoor Grama Panchayat

Area
  - Total: 16.08 km^{2} (6.21 sq mi)

Population (2011)
  - Total: 7,769
  - Density: 483.1/km^{2} (1,251/sq mi)

Languages
  - Official: Malayalam, English
- Time zone: UTC+5:30 (IST)
- PIN: 670673
- ISO 3166 code: IN-KL

Vellarvally is a village in Peravoor in Kannur district in the Indian state of Kerala.

== Demographics ==
As of 2011 Census, Vellarvelly had a population of 7,769 of which 3,834 are males and 3,935 are females. Vellarvelly village spreads over 16.08 km^{2} (6.21 sq mi) area with 1,851 families residing in it. The sex ratio of Vellarvelly was 1,026 lower than state average of 1,084. Population of children in the age group 0-6 was 703 (9%) which constitutes 365 males and 338 females. Vellarvelly had an overall literacy of 95.2% higher than state average of 94%. The male literacy stands at 96.6% and female literacy was 93.9%.

== Transportation ==
The national highway passes through Kannur town. Mangalore and Mumbai can be accessed on the northern side and Cochin and Thiruvananthapuram can be accessed on the southern side. The road to the east of Iritty connects to Mysore and Bangalore. The nearest railway station is Kannur on Mangalore-Palakkad line. There are airports at Mangalore and Calicut.
