= Mridanga Saileswari Temple =

- മുഴക്കുന്ന് മൃദംഗശൈലേശ്വരി ക്ഷേത്രം
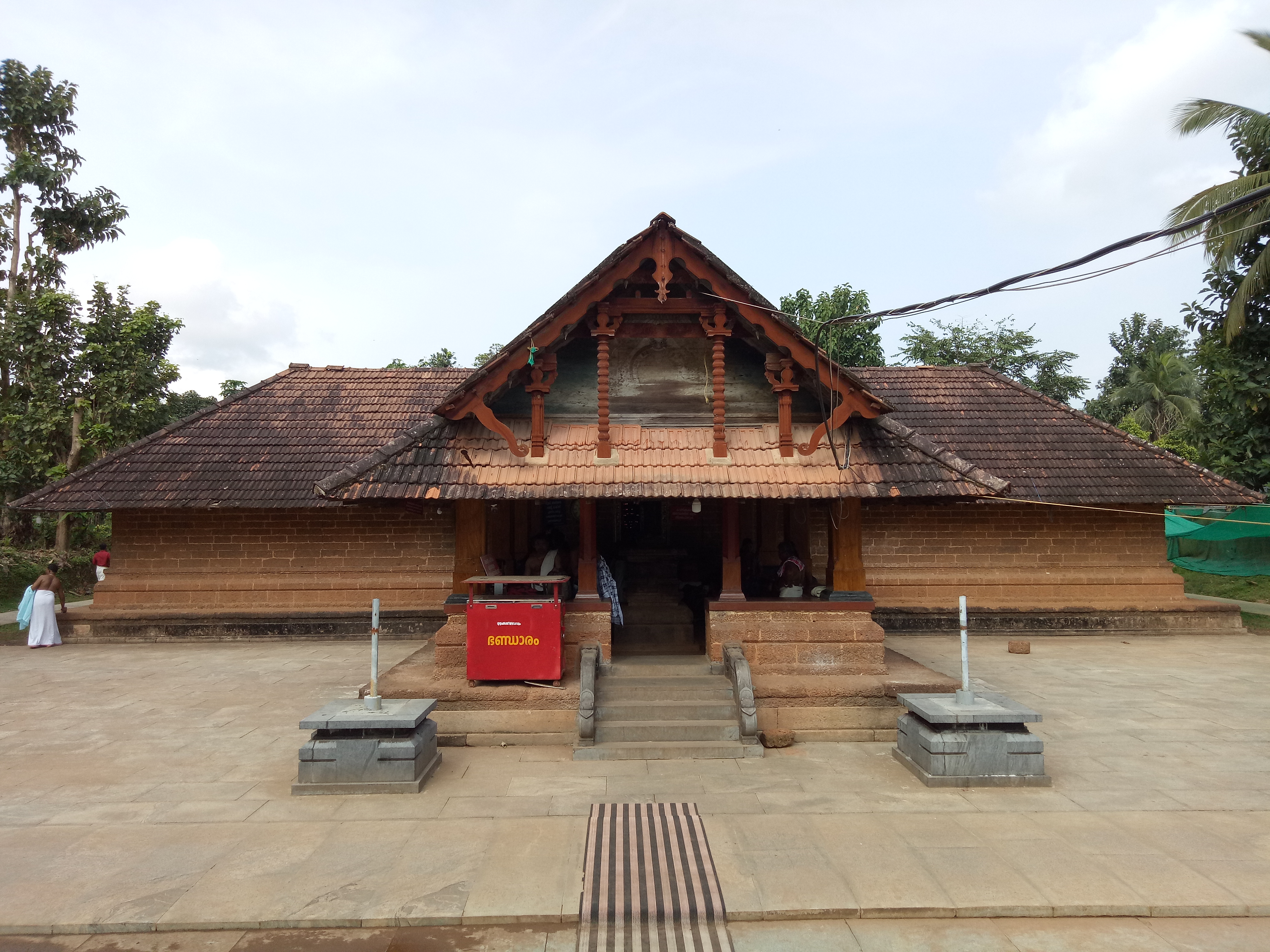

Religion
- Affiliation: Hinduism
- District: Kannur
- Deity: Durga as Saraswati (Mridanga Shaileshwari) and Chamunda (Porkali)
- Governing body: Mridanga Shaileswari Temple Trust, A National trust controlled by the Government Of India

Location
- Location: Muzhakunnu
- State: Kerala
- Country: India

Architecture
- Type: Kerala Architecture

Website
- www.mridangasaileswaritemple.org

Mridanga Saileswari Temple (Malayalam: മൃദംഗശൈലേശ്വരി ക്ഷേത്രം) is a famous Hindu temple located in Muzhakunnu, Kannur district, Kerala, India. It is one among the 108 Durga temples of ancient Kerala, believed to have been installed by Parashurama, the sixth avatar of Lord Vishnu. The main deity, Mridanga Saileswari, is a four-armed Durga holding conch and discus in the two hands pointed upwards, blessing her devotees with the front right hand and placing her front left hand on her waist.

The three principal forms of Durga worshipped in Hinduism are Maha-Durga, Chandika and Aparajita. Of these, Chandika has two forms called Chandi who is of the combined power and form of Saraswati, Lakshmi and Parvati and of Chamunda who is an esoteric aspect of Chandi created by the goddess for killing demons Chanda and Munda. Maha Durga has three forms, Ugrachanda, Bhadrakali and Katyayani. Bhadrakali Durga is also worshiped in the form of her nine epithets called Navadurga.

The main deity in this temple is Durga who is also called Mizhavil Bhagavathi in a separate Sanctum prohibited to public. Mizhavil Bhagavathi exists as Chandi and Chamunda in this temple. Mizhavil Bhagavathi exhibits herself as Saraswati, also called Mridanga Shaileshwari in this temple Srikovil, with a predominant power of knowledge, giving blessings of skill (Siddhi) in arts and as Chamunda also called Porkali outside the main temple complex. Mizhavil Bhagavathi as Mridanga Shaileshwari, in this temple acts as the patron of music, arts and all kinds of knowledge. Mridanga Shaileshwari in the main temple sanctum sanctorum (Srikovil) can also be worshipped as Saraswati, Parvati Lakshmi or Chandi depending upon the need. The power of Saraswati, knowledge, is said to be predominant here and she is the goddess of arts, especially music, as per legend. The worship of this temple is said to be not complete unless one worships the secret Mizhavil Bhagavati in the secret inner sanctum.

Mridanga shaileshwari is the family deity of Kottayam royal family. The legend of Pazhassi Raja is closely associated with this temple.

The temple, which was under ruins for a long time, gained national prominence when Alexander Jacob, a retired DGP of Kerala Police revealed a fascinating story related to the temple. It is said that thieves tried to steal the temple idol 3 times and each time they failed to do so because of strange reasons. Each time the idol was stolen, the idol was returned to the temple by the thieves themselves because of strange paranormal activity. Alexander Jacob revealed this story in a television interview. From that day onwards, thousands of devotees have been visiting the temple every day. The temple is administered by Mridanga Shaileswari Temple Trust, A National Trust, an autonomous body under the Government of India.
