= Kalliad =

Village in Kerala, India

- village
- Location in Kerala, India
- Coordinates: 12.0051°N 75.5830°E
- Country: India
- State: Kerala
- District: Kannur
- Taluk: Iritty

Government
  - Type: Panchayati raj (India)

Area
  - Total: 30.02 km^{2} (11.59 sq mi)

Population (2011)
  - Total: 9,410
  - Density: 313/km^{2} (812/sq mi)

Languages
  - Official: Malayalam, English
- Time zone: UTC+5:30 (IST)
- Postal code: 670593
- ISO 3166 code: IN-KL
- Vehicle registration: KL-78

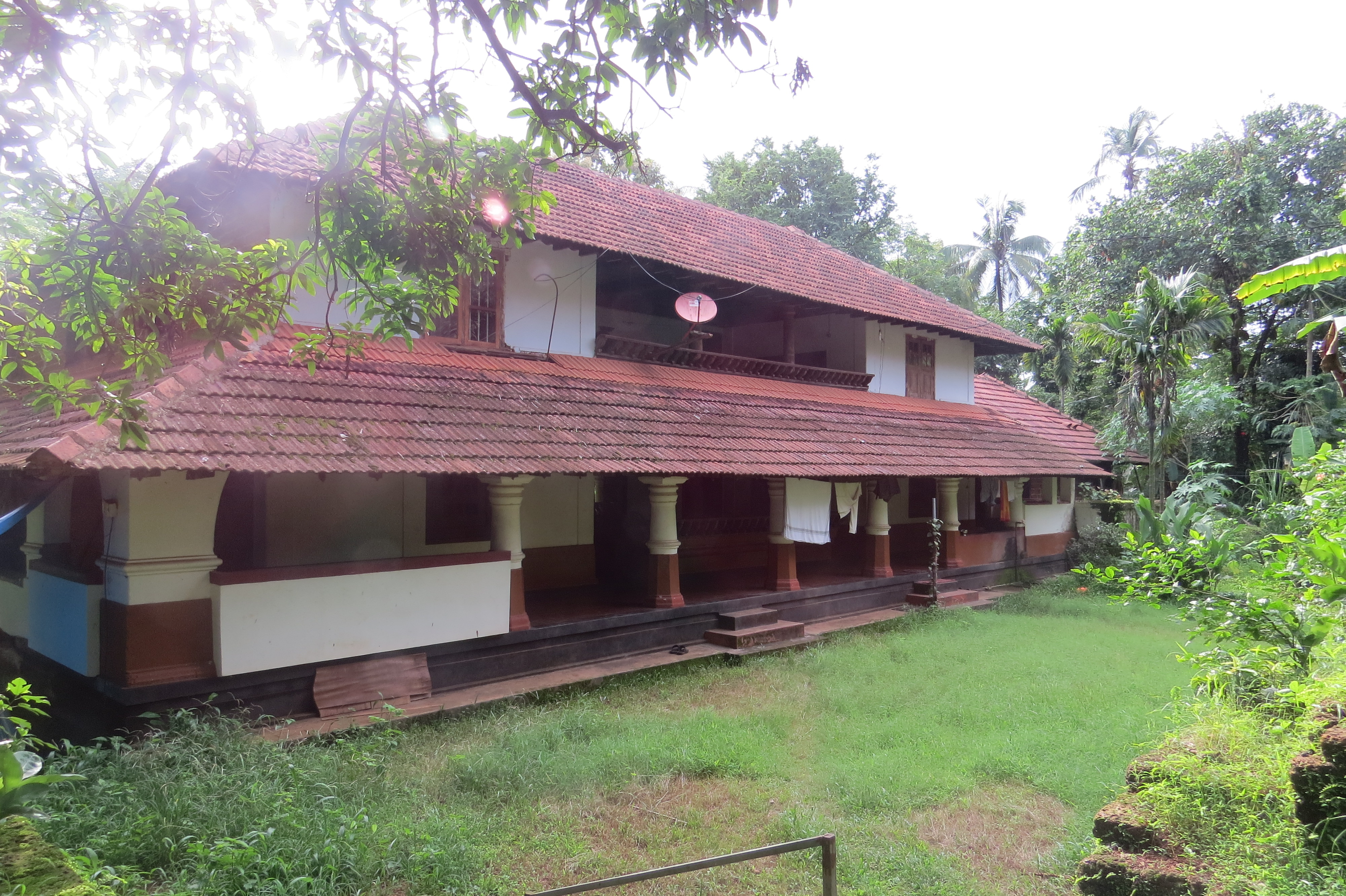
Old house of previous landlords at Kalliad

Kalliad is a village in Kannur district in the Indian state of Kerala.

== Demographics ==
As of 2011 Census, Kalliad had a population of 9,410 of which 4,590 are males and 4,820 are females. Kalliad village spreads over 30.02 km^{2} (11.59 sq mi) area with 2,163 families residing in it. The sex ratio of Kalliad was 1,050 lower than state average of 1,084. Population of children in the age group 0-6 was 1,059 (11.3%) which constitutes 515 males and 544 females. Kalliad had overall literacy of 92.2% lower than state average of 94%. The male literacy stands at 96.1% and female literacy was 88.4%.

== Transportation ==
The national highway passes through Taliparamba town. Mangalore and Mumbai can be accessed on the northern side and Cochin and Thiruvananthapuram can be accessed on the southern side. The road to the east connects to Mysore and Bangalore.

The nearest railway station is Kannur on the Mangalore-Palakkad line.

There are airports at Mattannur ( Kannur International ), Mangalore and Calicut.
