= Manikkadavu =

Manikkadave Manikkadavu
- Town
- Manikkadavu, Kannur, India Manikkadave (India)
- Coordinates: 12.0941°N 75.6523°E
- Country: India
- State: Kerala
- District: Kannur

Government
  - Body: Ulikkal Grama Panchayat

Languages
  - Official: Malayalam, English
- Time zone: UTC+5:30 (IST)
- PIN: 670705
- ISO 3166 code: IN-KL
- Vehicle registration: KL- 78
- Nearest city: Iritty
- Lok Sabha constituency: Kannur
- Climate: humid (Köppen)
- Website: manikkadavu.co.in www.manikkadavu.com www.manikkadave.com

Manikkadave or Manikkadavu is a town in Kannur district, Kerala, India. It borders the Coorg district of Karnataka. Manikkadavu is located 15 km north of the town of Iritty, and is 56 km north-east of the district capital Kannur. It is between the towns/villages of Ulikkal, Payyavoor, and Kanjirakolli.

== Geography ==
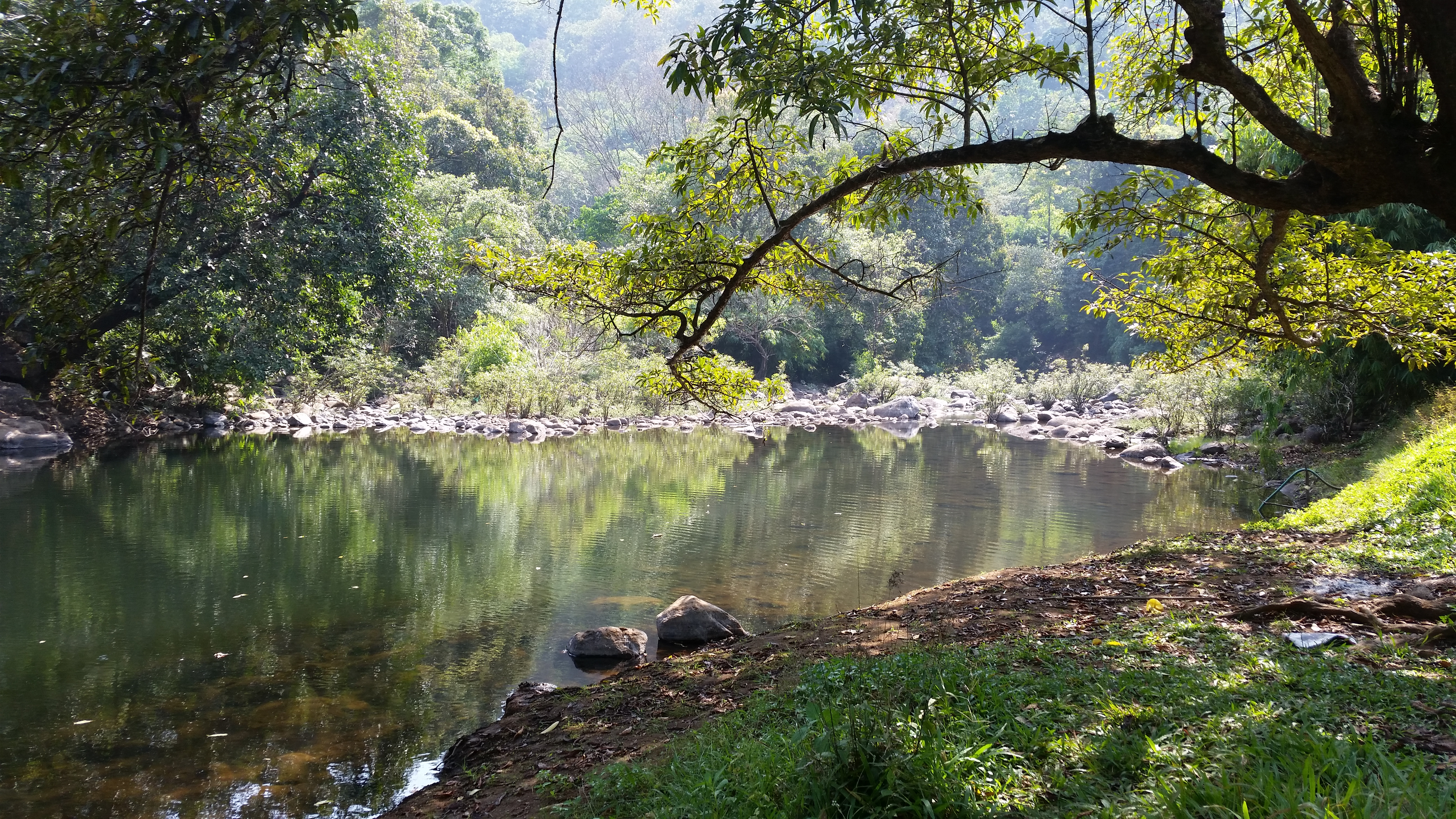
Thenan Kayam

Manikkadavu has a mixture of both midland countryside and the Malanad hill area, enveloped in greenery with a clean and unpolluted atmosphere. Manikkadavu town is medium-sized at about three thousand feet above sea level. The place is known for its agriculture and landscape. It is full of hills and valleys of the Manikkadavu river.

== People ==
The original inhabitants of the land were Karimpalas. Large scale migration from Travancore started in Manikkadavu from 1948. Today a majority of the population is made up of the migrant Syrian Christians (Syro-Malabar Catholic). There is a small colony of Karimpalas near Alavikunnu. It resembles a tropical rain-forest area with all kinds of trees like teak, jackfruit, coconut, rubber, arecanut, and other crops. Most of the people are farmers and they cultivate rubber, ginger, turmeric, pepper, cashew and other spices. A considerable variety of medicinal plants also grow in Manikkadavu which have been used in making the traditional home remedies.

== Culture ==
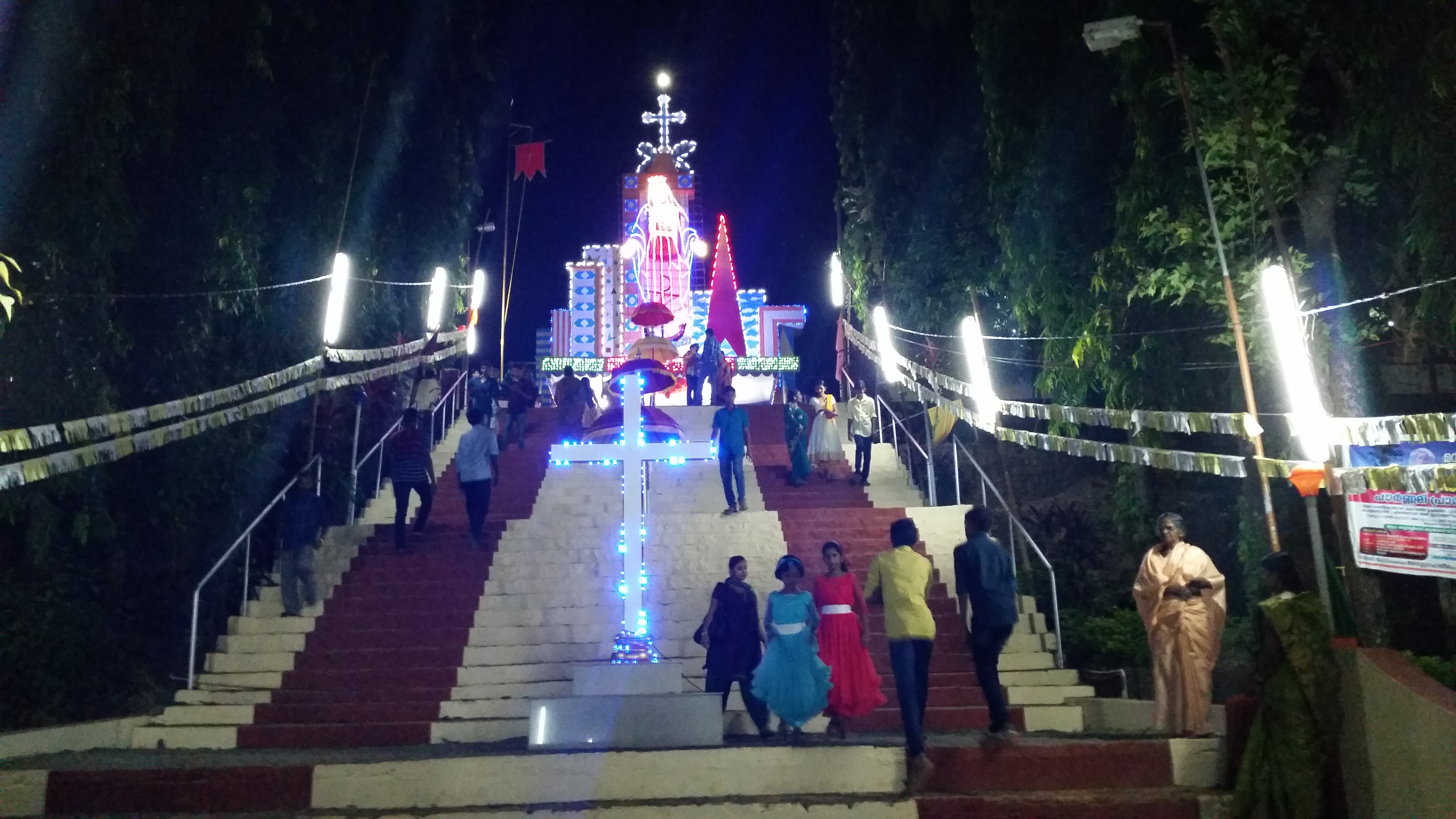
Manikkadavu Perunnal

Manikkadavu is a rural but modern village with a predominantly hilly topography. It has a dominant village culture, with celebrating the annual festivals and feasts in church. Kerala's own culture exists here in vibrant form. There is only a moderate level of political activity, Indian National Congress and Communist Party of India are the dominant parties and there is no social divisions over politics. People at Manikkadavu are educated and self-employed or employed either in government, private or abroad.

== Transportation ==
The national highway passes through Kannur town. Mangalore and Mumbai can be accessed on the northern side and Cochin and Thiruvananthapuram can be accessed on the southern side. The road to the east of Iritty connects to Mysore and Bangalore. The nearest railway station is Kannur on Mangalore-Palakkad line. There are airports at Kannur, Mangalore and Calicut. The village of Manikkadavu is located 60 km from the district headquarters of Kannur. One can reach Manikkadavu via Iritty- Ulikal- Vattiamthode- or Iritty- Ulickal- Nuchiad - Manikkadavu and from Taliparamba via Payyavur- Nuchiad- Manippara.

== History ==
=== Name ===
The name Manikkadave is also spelt "Manikkadavu" or "Manikadave". The myth about the name is related to the story of a "durmurthi" (evil spirit or demon) called Manikkadachokkaali (also known as Manikkadachokkari) most feared by the aborigines, the Karimpalas. It is traditionally believed that Manikkadavu and Manippara- the two neighboring villages - got their old names Manikkada and Manipparambu respectively from ‘Manikkadachokkali’ and 'Mani Bhagavathi' or Goddess Mani. Later the settlers from Travancore modified the names to the present day form.

Before the advent of settlers from Travancore, the only inhabitants of the land were Karimpalas and the place a part of a dense private forest owned by an aristocratic ‘janmi’ (landlord) family.

=== Early history ===
Manikkadavu and the adjacent villages, before the independence of India, were private forest owned by a landlord family of Nayanar caste called "Karaykkattu Idam". They were the subjects of Chiraykal Rajas who retained power as the loyalists of the British Raj. As per the local version of feudalism, the ‘janmi’ (landlord) family was not only owned the land but ruled over its tenants. The tenements of this forest land were the Karimpalas, the first ever inhabitants of Manikkadavu. Though some very old Karimpala elders say that there lived in ancient Manikkadavu a tribe called ‘Vedikalamar’, there is no proof of it.

== Climate ==
Climate data for Manikkadavu, Kerala
Month	Jan	Feb	Mar	Apr	May	Jun	Jul	Aug	Sep	Oct	Nov	Dec	Year
Mean daily maximum °C (°F)	31.6 (88.9)	32.5 (90.5)	33.6 (92.5)	33.9 (93.0)	33.2 (91.8)	29.9 (85.8)	28.6 (83.5)	29.0 (84.2)	29.7 (85.5)	30.5 (86.9)	31.0 (87.8)	31.2 (88.2)	31.2 (88.2)
Mean daily minimum °C (°F)	21.4 (70.5)	22.6 (72.7)	24.3 (75.7)	25.7 (78.3)	25.6 (78.1)	23.9 (75.0)	23.4 (74.1)	23.5 (74.3)	23.5 (74.3)	23.6 (74.5)	22.9 (73.2)	21.5 (70.7)	23.5 (74.3)
Average precipitation mm (inches)	3 (0.1)	4 (0.2)	12 (0.5)	85 (3.3)	283 (11.1)	867 (34.1)	1,332 (52.4)	711 (28.0)	329 (13.0)	279 (11.0)	106 (4.2)	23 (0.9)	4,034 (158.8)
Source: Climate-Data.org
