= Vayathur =

- Village
- Location in Kerala, India
- Coordinates: 12.069860°N 75.68247°E
- Country: India
- State: Kerala
- District: Kannur

Government
  - Type: Village

Area
  - Total: 43.4 km^{2} (16.8 sq mi)

Population (2011)
  - Total: 22,743
  - Density: 524/km^{2} (1,360/sq mi)

Languages
  - Official: Malayalam, English
- Time zone: UTC+5:30 (IST)
- PIN: 670705
- ISO 3166 code: IN-KL
- Vehicle registration: KL-78

Vayathur is a village in Ulikkal Grama panchayat of Kannur district in the Indian state of Kerala.

== Demographics ==
As of 2011 Census, Vayathur village had a population of 22,743 which comprises 11,207 males and 11,536 females. Vayathur village spreads over an area of 43.4 km^{2} (16.8 sq mi) with 5,395 families residing in it. The sex ratio of Vayathur was 1,029 lower than state average of 1,084. Population of children in the age group 0-6 was 2,326 (10.2%) where 1,227 are males and 1,099 are females. Vayathur had an overall literacy of 95.1% higher than state average of 94%. The male literacy stands at 96.6% and female literacy was 93.7%.

== Transportation ==
The national highway passes through Kannur town. Mangalore and Mumbai can be accessed on the northern side and Cochin and Thiruvananthapuram can be accessed on the southern side. The road to the east of Iritty connects to Mysore and Bangalore. The nearest railway station is Kannur on Mangalore-Palakkad line. There are airports at Mattannur.
