= Famine in Travancore during World War II =

Wartime famine in the princely state of Travancore (1942–1944)

- Part of World War II; wartime food crises in British India (including the Bengal famine of 1943)
- Date: 1942–1944 (peak in 1943)
- Location: Travancore (present-day Kerala, India)
- Cause: Loss of Burmese rice imports (1942); delayed/ineffective procurement and rationing; inter‑regional supply competition; structural dependence on cash crops
- Outcome: Widespread malnutrition and epidemic disease; political delegitimization of the Travancore regime; impetus to left mobilization
- Deaths: ≈ 90,000 (excess mortality, estimated)

Famine during World War II was a severe food crisis in the princely state of Travancore (now part of Kerala, India) between 1942 and 1944, peaking in 1943, causing widespread malnutrition and an estimated 90,000 excess deaths.

== Onset ==
In the late 19th and early 20th-century, Travancore’s economy had transformed into a cash crop economy of commodities such as tea, rubber, cardamom, and coir. These replaced local subsistence rice cultivation, and increased dependence on rice imports via Indian seaports, primarily from Burma. The Japanese conquest of Burma in 1942 cut off Travancore’s main rice supply, and redirected demand to Indian mainland producers. Competing wartime demands from Ceylon, Cochin State, and other deficit regions across British India stressed remaining supplies, leading to price rises, and severe shortages in Travancore. Black market activities and collapse of key trades such as coir exports, worsened purchasing power, augmenting food insecurity.

== Government response ==
The Diwan of Travancore, C. P. Ramaswami Iyer, implemented a series of reactive measures including permits, stock declarations, and eventually centralized rationing. The initial regulatory approach relying on permits and trader self-reporting failed to control prices. Later stages saw centralization of procurement and rationing, but ration quotas remained low and leakages were significant. Neighboring Cochin adopted firmer and timelier procurement policies.

Tapioca was promoted as a famine substitute but did not prevent widespread malnutrition and mortality.

== Death toll ==
Parish records estimate about 90,000 deaths from 1942 to 1944. Severe malnutrition increased vulnerability to diseases such as cholera and smallpox, which contributed to excess deaths.

Incomplete records and prevailing wartime censorship left many deaths unrecorded. The 1945 Famine Inquiry Commission focused mainly on Bengal and lacked sufficient data to classify Travancore’s crisis formally as a famine. The Bengal famine of 1943 caused far higher absolute mortality, but Travancore’s proportional losses were significant.

== Aftermath ==
Opposition to actions of the princely regime during the period of the famine led to leftist political mobilization, and contributed to the rise of communism in Kerala. Public memory of the famine remained muted for decades compared to Bengal.

== See also ==
- Bengal famine of 1943
- India in World War II
- Punnapra-Vayalar uprising
- Food security in India
