= Maalakkallu =

Village in Kasargod District, Kerala, India

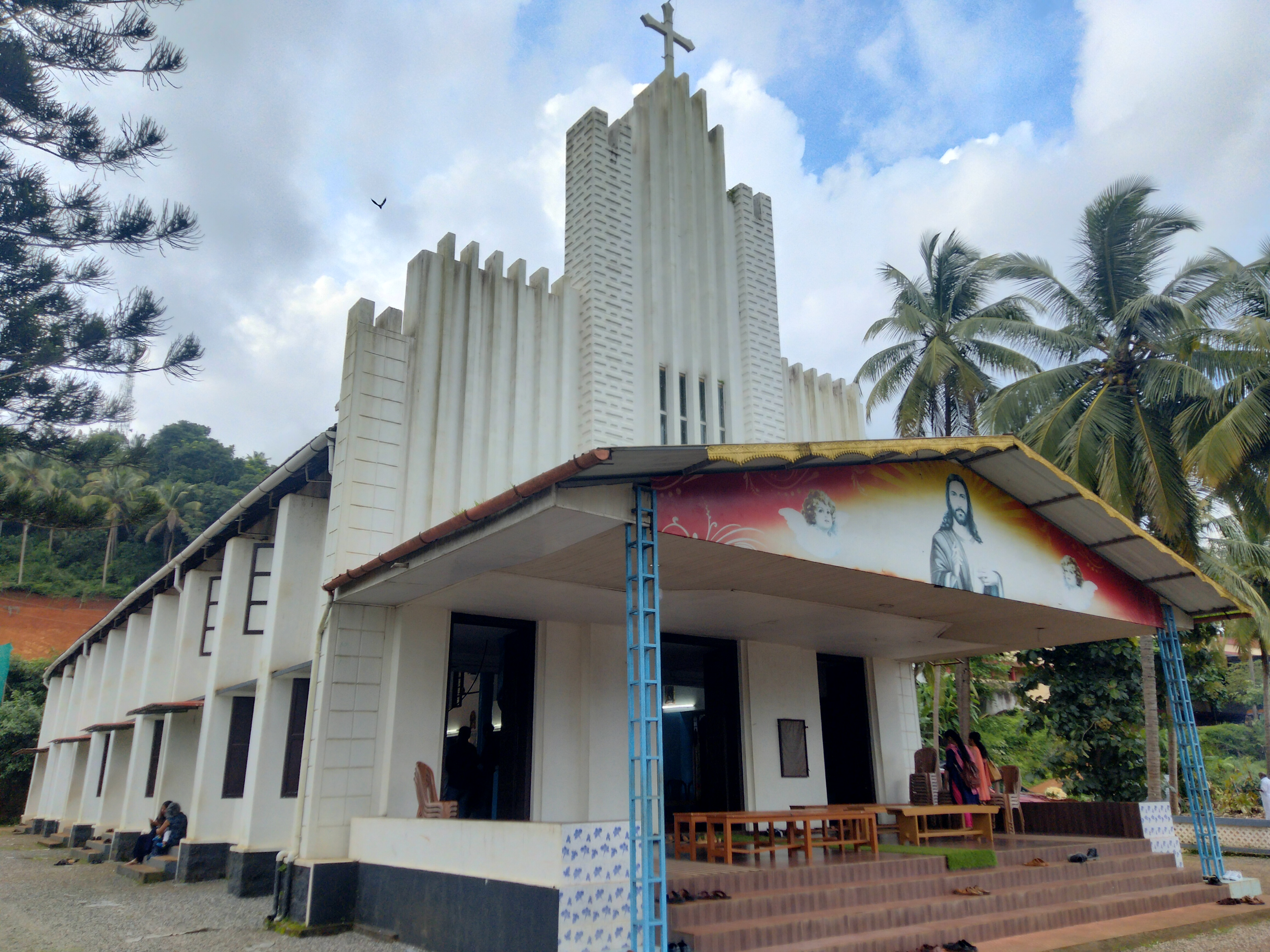
Lourd Matha Church Malakkallu

Malakallu is an expanding town in Kasaragod district, state of Kerala.OLL knanaya Catholic church is situated in the centre of this town.

== Transportation ==
There is a 20 km road from Panathur (13 km from Mallakallu) to Sullia in Karnataka from where Bangalore and Mysore can be easily accessed. The location in Kerala can be accessed by driving towards the western side. State Highway 56 (Kerala) connecting Kanhangad and Panathur passes through the heart of the town. The nearest railway station is Kanhangad Railway Station (29 km) on the Mangalore-Palakkad and Mangalore-Ernakulam lines. There are airports at Mangalore (98 km) and Calicut(208).
