= Vilamana =

- village
- Location in Kerala, India
- Coordinates: 12.0281°N 75.7093°E
- Country: India
- State: Kerala
- District: Kannur
- Taluk: Iritty

Government
  - Body: Payam Grama Panchayat

Area
  - Total: 16.3 km^{2} (6.3 sq mi)

Population (2011)
  - Total: 14,059
  - Density: 863/km^{2} (2,230/sq mi)

Languages
  - Official: Malayalam, English
- Time zone: UTC+5:30 (IST)
- PIN: 670703
- Telephone code: 0490
- ISO 3166 code: IN-KL
- Vehicle registration: KL-78
- Lok Sabha constituency: Kannur
- Vidhan Sabha constituency: Peravoor

Vilamana is a village in Kannur district in the Indian state of Kerala.

== Demographics ==
As of 2011 Census, Vilamana had a population of 14,059 of which 6,944 are males and 7,115 are females. Vilamana village spreads over 16.3 km^{2} (6.3 sq mi) area with 3,206 families residing in it. The sex ratio of Vilamana was 1,025 lower than state average of 1,084. Population of children in the age group 0-6 was 1,360 (9.7%) which constitutes 698 males and 662 females. Vilamana had overall literacy of 94.8% higher than state average of 94%. The male literacy stands at 96.5% and female literacy was 93%.

== Transportation ==
Thalassery-Coorg road SH-30 passes through the vilamana.

The national highway passes through Kannur town. Mangalore and Mumbai can be accessed on the northern side and Cochin and Thiruvananthapuram can be accessed on the southern side. The road to the east of Iritty connects to Mysore and Bangalore. The nearest railway station is Kannur on Mangalore-Palakkad line. The nearest airport is at Kannur. Other airports are at Mangalore and Calicut.
