= Ulikkal =

Ulikkal Ulickal
- Town
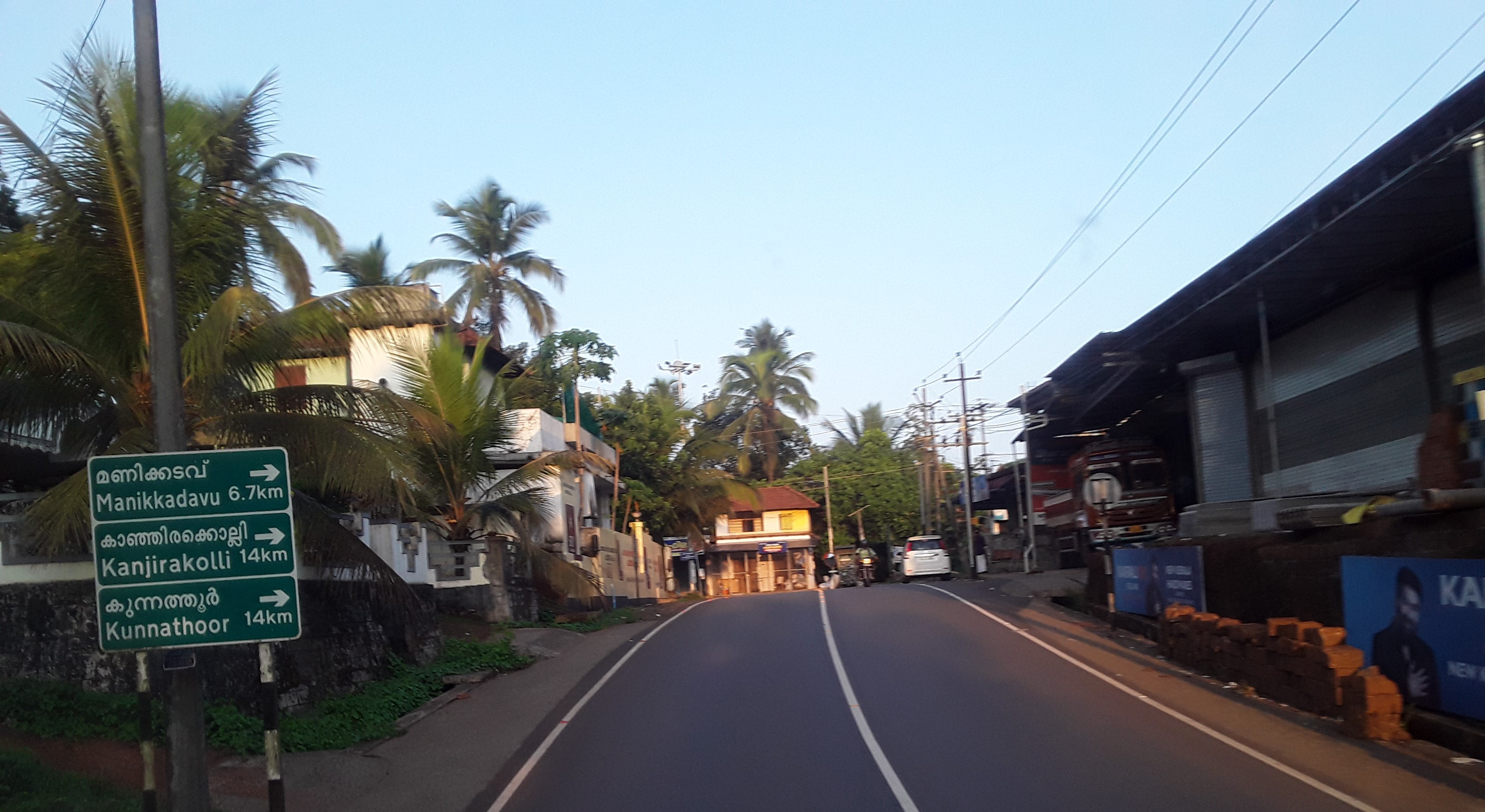
- Hill Highway at Nuchiyad, Ulikkal

- Location in Kerala, India Ulikkal (India)
- Coordinates: 12°2′0″N 75°39′0″E
- Country: India
- State: Kerala
- District: Kannur
- Taluk: Iritty

Government
  - Type: Panchayati raj (India)
  - Body: Ulikkal Grama Panchayat

Area
  - Total: 74.68 km^{2} (28.83 sq mi)
- Elevation: 43 m (141 ft)

Population (2011)
  - Total: 35,429
  - Density: 474.4/km^{2} (1,229/sq mi)

Languages
  - Official: Malayalam, English
- Time zone: UTC+5:30 (IST)
- PIN: 670705
- ISO 3166 code: IN-KL-78
- Vehicle registration: KL-78
- Assembly constituency: Irikkur
- Lok Sabha constituency: Kannur
- Climate: humid (Köppen)
- Website: www.ulikkal.com

Ulikkal is a small town in the Kannur district of Kerala, India. It serves as the headquarters of the Ulikkal Grama Panchayat in Iritty taluk. The Kerala State Hill Highway (SH 59) passes through Ulikkal. The Ulikkal Panchayat shares its eastern border with the Kodagu district of Karnataka, near the Kalanki hill station.

== Location ==
Ulikkal is located about 7 km (4.3 mi) north of the taluk headquarters at Iritty, 45 km (28 mi) from the district headquarters at Kannur (via Irikkur-Kalliad-Urathur), and 8.5 km (5.3 mi) from Koottupuzha bridge (via Peratta), near the Kerala–Karnataka border.

== Demographics ==
As per the 2011 census, Ulikkal Grama Panchayat had a total population of 35,429, comprising 17,457 males and 17,952 females. The sex ratio of Ulikkal was 1,028, which is lower than the state average of 1,084. The population of children in the 0–6 age group was 3,648 (10.3%), including 1,895 males and 1,753 females. The overall literacy rate of Ulikkal was 94.8%, higher than the state average of 94%. Male literacy stood at 96.6%, while female literacy was 93.1%.

Ulikkal Grama Panchayat comprises two revenue villages, namely Nuchiyad and Vayathur, under its administrative jurisdiction.

== History ==
Ulikkal is located near the Vayathur village panchayat area and is home to the Bythoor or Baithur (Vayathur) Temple. The Bythoorappa (Vayathoorappan) Vayathur Kaliyar Shiva Kshethra, believed to be over 300 years old, is one of the major temples in the panchayat. It is situated on the banks of the Valapattanam River, about 3 km from the town. The river originates in Kodagu and flows through Parikkalam and Nuchiyad villages.

The Eshwara (Shiva or Mahadeva) temple at Vayathur, located near the Kodagu border, is an important pilgrimage centre for the Kodavas of Kodagu. The annual temple festival is jointly celebrated by the Kodavas and the Malayalis in keeping with tradition. Historically, the temple priests from Kodagu were Namboothiri Brahmins. Kodagu, which borders Kannur district, lies adjacent to the Ulikkal region.

According to local folklore, the deities worshipped in Kodagu are of Kerala origin and are believed to have entered Kodagu from Kerala thousands of years ago through Vayathur (Bythoor), near the present-day border. Historically, Ulikkal was part of the Vayathur region.

== Administration ==
Ulikkal Grama Panchayat consists of two revenue villages like Nuchiyad and Vayathur and the panchayat is divided into 22 wards. The current ruling party of the panchayat is UDF. Ulikkal panchayat is part of Irikkur Block Panchayat and politically a part of Irikkur Assembly constituency under Kannur Lok Sabha constituency.

== Law and Order ==
The Panchayat comes under jurisdiction of Ulikkal police station, established on 18 November 1972. This police station is part of Iritty subdivision under Kannur rural police district.

== Geography ==
Ulikkal is a hilly village located on the eastern side of the Kannur district. The terrain is generally undulating, and the easternmost part of the area is covered by forests that border the state of Karnataka.

== Educational Institutions ==
- Floweret English medium school, Ulikkal
- St.Joseph English school, Ulikkal
- GHSS, Ulikkal
- Vayathur UP school, Ulikkal
- St.Thomas HSS, Manikkadave
- SV UP school, Parikkalam
- St.Thomas UP school, Manikkadave
- Charis UP school, Mattara
- St.Joseph AUP school, Arabi
- Govt.UP school, Nuchiyad
- Govt.LP school, Perumpally
- St.Sebastian LP school, Nellikkampoyil
- Govt.LP school, Mattara
- Govt.LP school, Puravayal

== Economy ==
The economy of Ulikkal Panchayat is primarily agrarian. The major crops cultivated include rubber, cashew, coconut, and areca nut. Ulikkal was among the panchayats in the Kannur district that were severely affected by the 2018 Kerala floods, which caused significant economic losses to farmers. Approximately 12 hectares of cropped area, mainly rubber and cashew plantations, were destroyed by strong winds. The most affected areas within the panchayat were the midland slopes (around 43 m elevation) and mid-highlands (around 178 m elevation), including Kalanki, Kolithatt, Vayathur, Arabikulam, and Kokkad.

== Transportation ==
Kerala State Highway SH 59 passes through Ulikkal, connecting the town to nearby villages and towns in the hilly terrains of Kannur district. The taluk headquarters, Iritty, is located about 7 km away. The road east of Ulikkal provides access to Mysore and Bangalore.

NH 66 passes through Taliparamba, which is approximately 43 km from Ulikkal. The northern stretch of the highway provides access to Mangalore and Mumbai, while the southern stretch connects to Cochin and Thiruvananthapuram. The nearest railway station is Kannur on the Shoranur–Mangalore section line.

The nearest airport is Kannur International Airport, located about 27 km from Ulikkal. The towns of Thalassery, Kannur, and Taliparamba are all at comparable distances from Ulikkal.
