= Muzhakkunnu =

Muzhakkunnu Mizhavu Kunnu
- Grama Panchayat
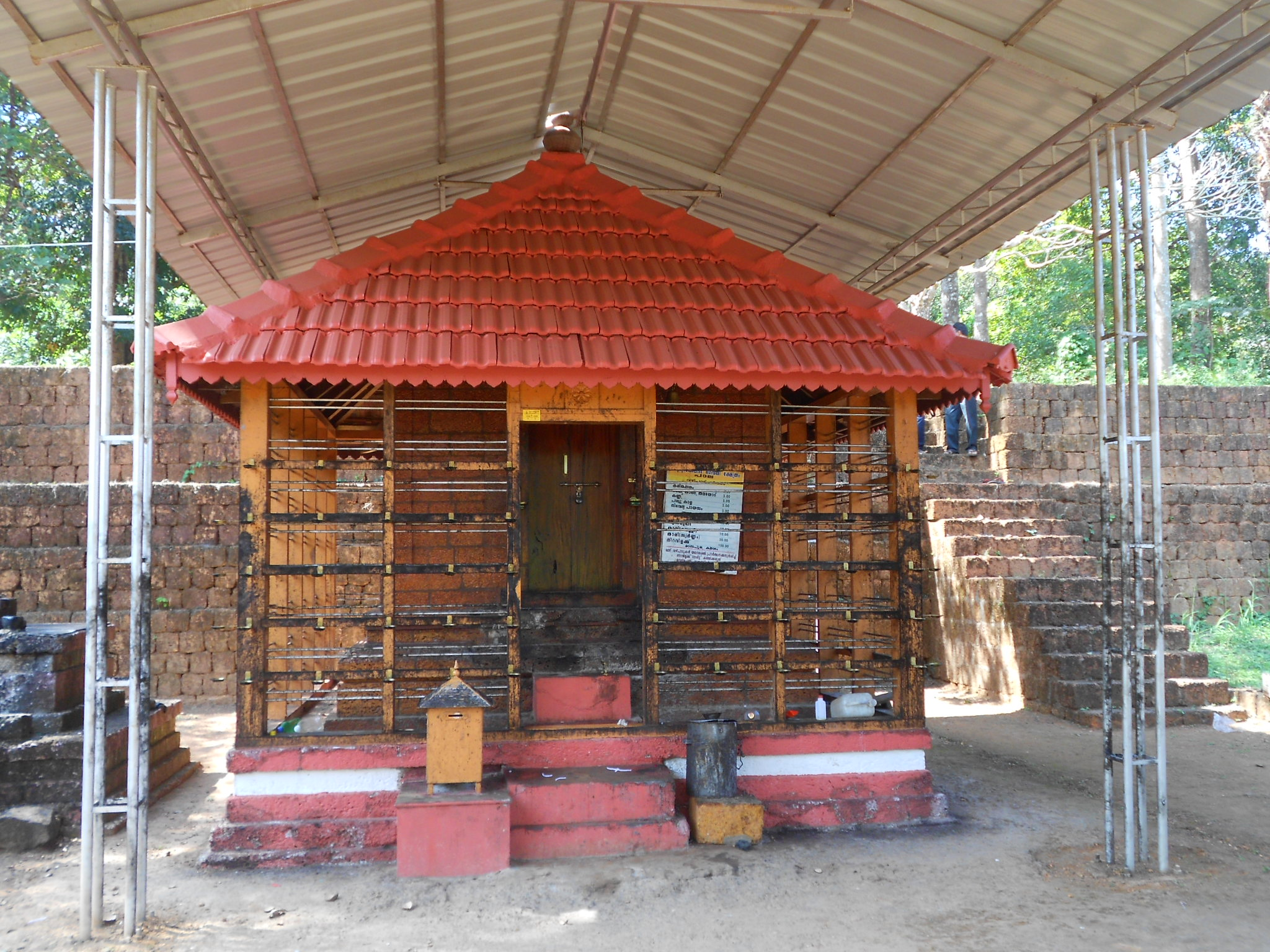
- Muzhakkunnu Bhagavathy Temple

- Location in Kerala, India
- Coordinates: 11°57′10″N 75°40′10″E
- Country: India
- State: Kerala
- District: Kannur

Government
  - Type: Panchayati raj (India)
  - Body: Muzhakkunnu Grama Panchayat

Area
  - Total: 31.03 km^{2} (11.98 sq mi)

Population (2011)
  - Total: 21,807
  - Density: 702.8/km^{2} (1,820/sq mi)

Languages
  - Official: Malayalam, English
- Time zone: UTC+5:30 (IST)
- PIN: 670673
- Telephone code: 0490
- ISO 3166 code: IN-KL
- Vehicle registration: KL-78
- Nearest city: Iritty
- Lok Sabha constituency: Kannur
- Vidhan Sabha constituency: Peravoor
- Climate: cool (Köppen)

Muzhakkunnu is a grama panchayat in Kannur district in the Indian state of Kerala. Kakkayangad is the headquarters of Muzhakkunnu grama panchayat.

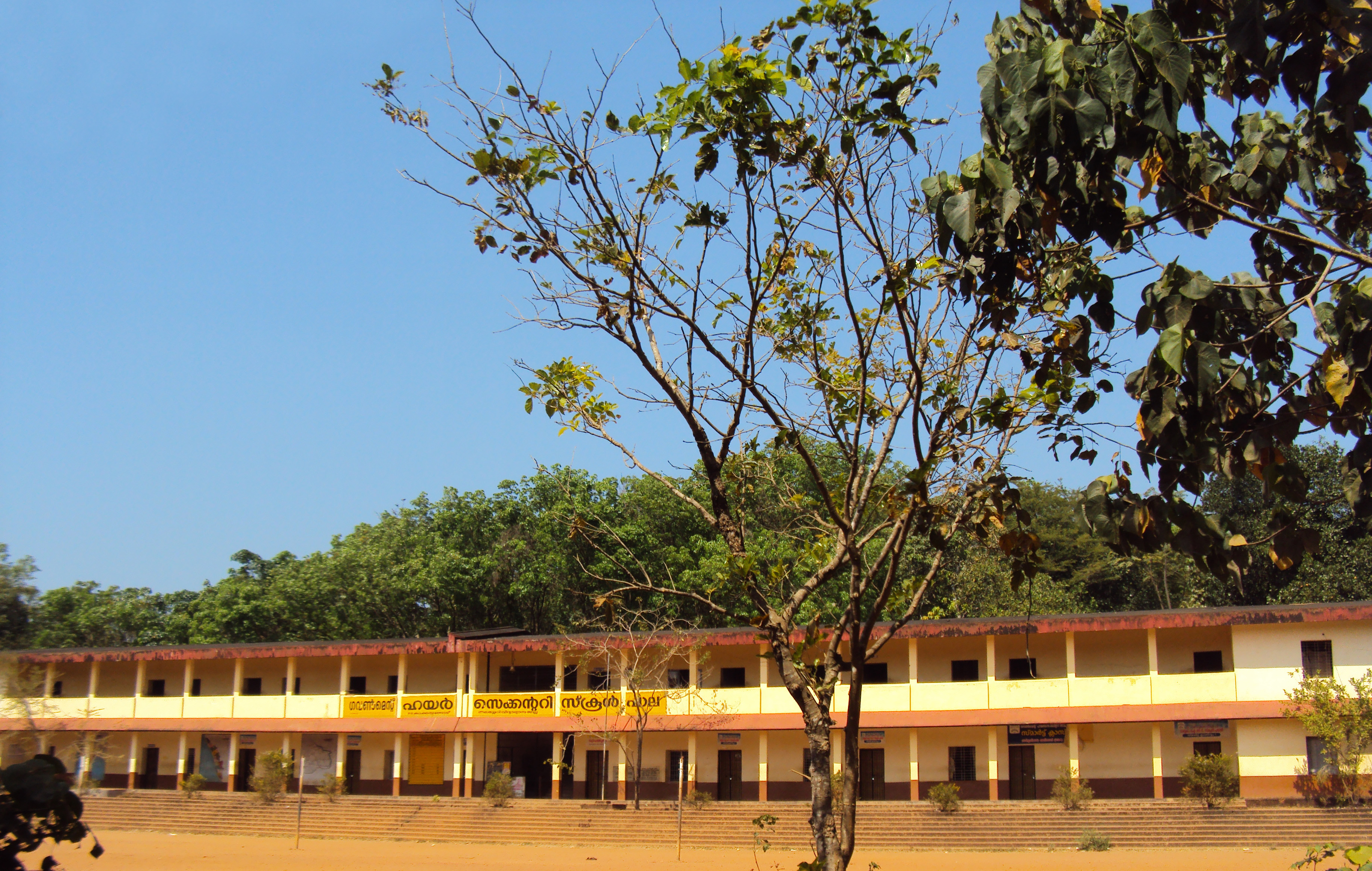
Pala School, Muzhakkunnu

== Demographics ==
As of 2011 Census, Muzhakkunnu had a population of 21,807, of whom 10,532 were males and 11,275 were females. Muzhakkunnu village spreads over an area of 31.03 km^{2} (11.98 sq mi) with 4,881 families residing in it. The sex ratio of Muzhakkunnu was 1,070, lower than the state average of 1,084. The population of children in the age group 0-6 was 2,507 (11.5%), where 1,273 were males and 1,234 were females. Muzhakkunnu had an overall literacy of 93%, lower than the state average of 94%. Male literacy was 96.5% and female literacy was 89.7%.

== Temples ==
Muzhakkunnu has a temple by the name Mridanga Saileswari Temple. It has a pancha loha idol inside.

== Transportation ==
The national highway passes through Thalassery town. Mangalore and Mumbai can be accessed on the northern side, and Cochin and Thiruvananthapuram can be accessed on the southern side. The road to the east of Iritty connects to Mysore and Bangalore. The nearest railway station is Thalassery railway station on the Mangalore-Palakkad line. There are airports at Kannur, Mangalore and Calicut.
