= Kelakam, India =

Kelakam
- Town
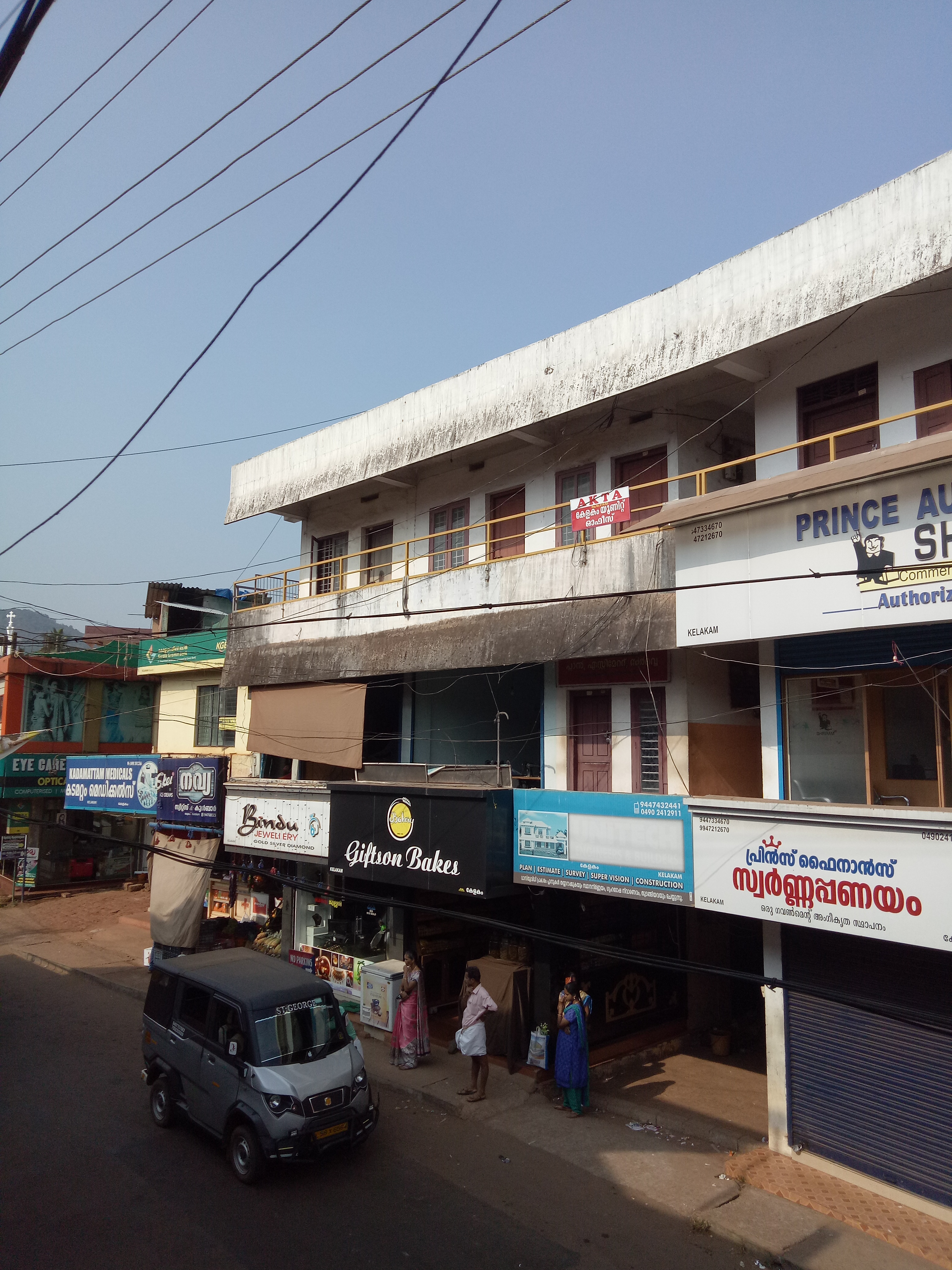

- Location in Kerala, India Kelakam (India)
- Coordinates: 11.8945°N 75.8098°E
- Country: India
- State: Kerala
- District: Kannur
- Taluk: Iritty

Government
  - Type: Panchayati raj (India)
  - Body: Kelakam Grama Panchayat

Area
  - Total: 77.92 km^{2} (30.09 sq mi)
- Elevation: 116 m (381 ft)

Population (2011)
  - Total: 20,747
  - Density: 266.3/km^{2} (689.6/sq mi)

Languages
  - Official: Malayalam, English
- Time zone: UTC+5:30 (IST)
- PIN: 670674
- Telephone code: 0490
- ISO 3166 code: IN-KL
- Vehicle registration: KL-78
- Sex ratio: 1,032 ♂/♀
- Literacy: 94.6%
- Niyamasabha constituency: Peravoor
- Lok Sabha constituency: Kannur
- Climate: Mild Climate (Köppen)
- Website: http://lsgkerala.in/kelakampanchayat/

Kelakam is a town and grama panchayat located in the Kannur district of Kerala state, India. Kerala Hill Highway (SH 59) and the proposed Mananthavady Mattanur airport road pass through Kelakam town.

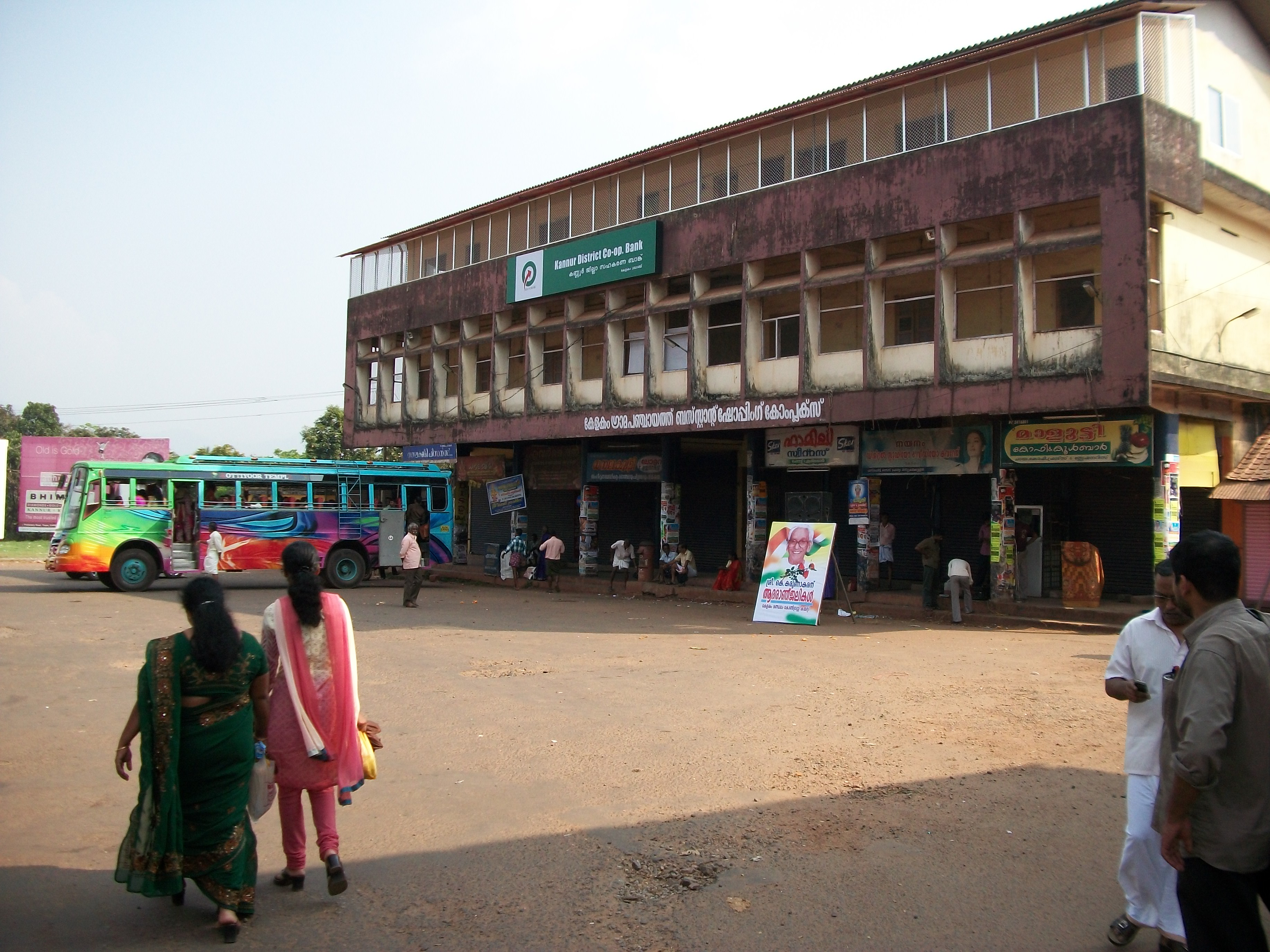
Kelakam Bus Station

== Location ==
Kelakam is located on Hill Highway of about 62 km (39 mi) east of district headquarters Kannur, 52 km (32 mi) north east of Thalassery, 24 km (15 mi) south east of taluk headquarters Iritty and 10 km (6.2 mi) east of Peravoor. The prominent Kottiyoor Temple is just 7 km (4.3 mi) away from here.

== Demographics ==
As of 2011 Census, Kelakam had a population of 16,211 of which 7,979 are males and 8,232 are females. Kelakam village spreads over an area of 77.93 km^{2} (30.09 sq mi) with 4,026 families residing in it. The sex ratio of Kelakam was 1,032 lower than state average of 1,084. Population of children in the age group 0-6 was 1,610 (9.9%) where 823 are males and 787 are females. Kelakam had an overall literacy of 94.6% higher than state average of 94%. The male literacy stands at 95.7% and female literacy was 93.6%.

== Administration ==
Kelakam Grama Panchayat consists of 14 wards. The current ruling party is UDF. Kelakam panchayat is part of Peravoor Block Panchayat and politically a part of Peravoor Assembly constituency under Kannur Lok Sabha constituency.

== Law and Order ==
The Panchayat comes under the jurisdiction of Kelakam police station, established on 01-04-1972. The station started as an outpost under Peravoor police station on 16 december 1960 before being upgraded to a full fledged station on 1972. This station is the border station of Kannur and Wayanad districts. The station is part of Peravoor subdivision under Kannur rural police district.

== Geography ==
It is a small town located in hilly regions of the western slope of western ghats. The Bavali River runs through the town, and the Kottiyoor Vadakkeshwaram Temple is seven kilometers away. It is situated near Aralam Wildlife Sanctuary which is ten kilometers away.

== Etymology ==
Kelakam got its name from words "kela" "kam" meaning resting place of "bullock" referring to resting place of the bullock of Lord Shiva. It is in the Christian migration belt but different religious groups live harmoniously. The town is known for its hill produce including pepper, rubber, tapioca, and coconut. The land around Kelakam is fertile and is preferred for farming. The town is a centre for textiles and jewelry shops.

== Tourism ==
Kelakam has been growing in population since the migration of people from the Travancore (South) side of Kerala 60-70 years ago. It is a centre of hill-produce, textiles shops, and jewellery shops. There are many Christian churches of various denominations in the area. Joseph Vadakkan, a Christian priest from Kerala, observed fasting for farmers in Kelakam.

== Transportation ==
Kerala Hill Highway (SH 59) passes through Kelakam town. The National Highway (NH 66) passes through Thalassery town on the west. Mangalore and Mumbai can be accessed on the northern side and Cochin and Thiruvananthapuram can be accessed on the southern side. The road to the east of Kelakam connects to Mysore and Bangalore through Mananthavadi route. The nearest railway station is Thalassery on Mangalore-Palakkad line. The nearest airport is Kannur International Airport which is 37 km (23 mi) away from Kelakam.

The proposed Mananthavady Mattannur airport four lane road passes through Kelakam where a bypass is being built for the town. It will give easy access for the people from south eastern parts of Kannur district and northern parts of Wayanad districts towards the airport.

== Educational institutions ==
- St.Thomas higher secondary school, Kelakam
- Little flower English high School, Kelakam
- MGM(Mar Gregorio's Memorial) high school, Kelakam
- St.Joseph's high school, Adakathode
- Manjalampuram UP school
- Govt.UP school, Chettiyamparamba
- Providence LP school, Velloonni
- St. Mark LP school, Chungakkunnu
- Govt.UP school, Adakkathode
- Govt.UP school, Chungakkunnu
- Govt.LP school, Shantigiri

== Religious places ==
- St. Thomas Orthodox Salem Church Kelakam
- San Jos Syro Malabar church kelakam (St.Joseph's church)
- Sree Murchilakattu Maha Devi temple Kelakam
- St. George Orthodox Valiyapalli kelakam
- Little Flower Malankara Catholic Church Kelakam
- Immanuel Marthoma Church Kelakam
- Indian Pentecostal Church of God, Kelakam
- Assemblies of God church(Pentecostal church), Kanichar
- The Pentecostal Mission Church, Kelakam
- St. Mary's & St. Thomas Jacobite Syrian Sunoro Church Kelakam
- St. Joseph's church Adakkathode
- St. George Malankara catholic church Adakkathode
- Sree Palliyara mahadevi temple Adakkathode
- St. Mary's Orthodox Church Chettiyamparamba
- St. John the Baptist's Church Chettiyamparamba
- Providence church velloonny
- St. Antony's Church Manjalampuram
- Fathima Matha Forane church Chungakkunnu

== Gallery ==
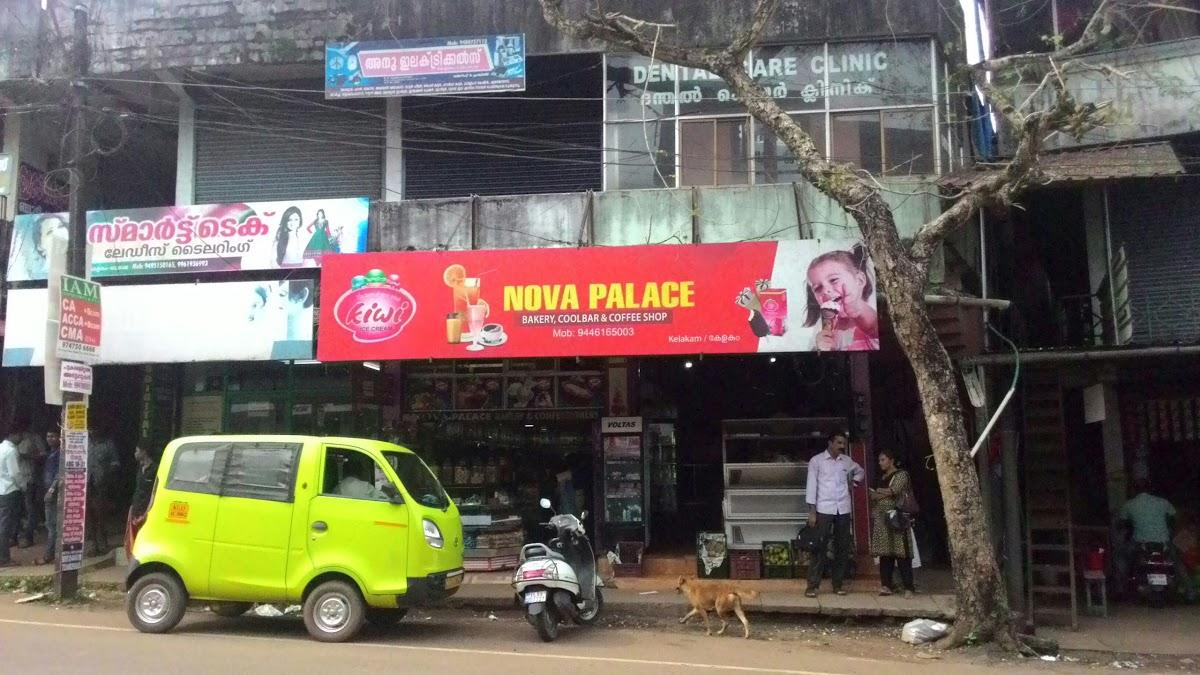
Kelakam Town

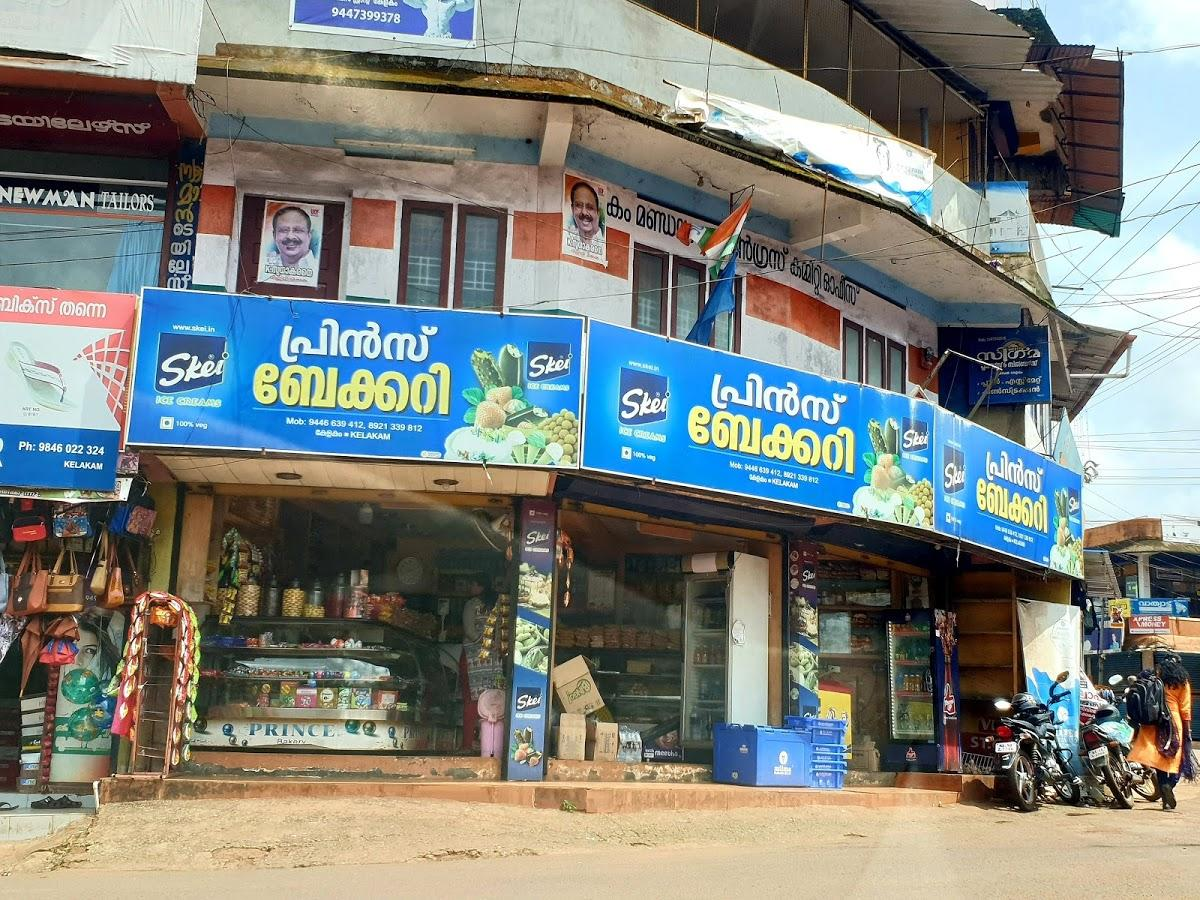
Kelakam Town

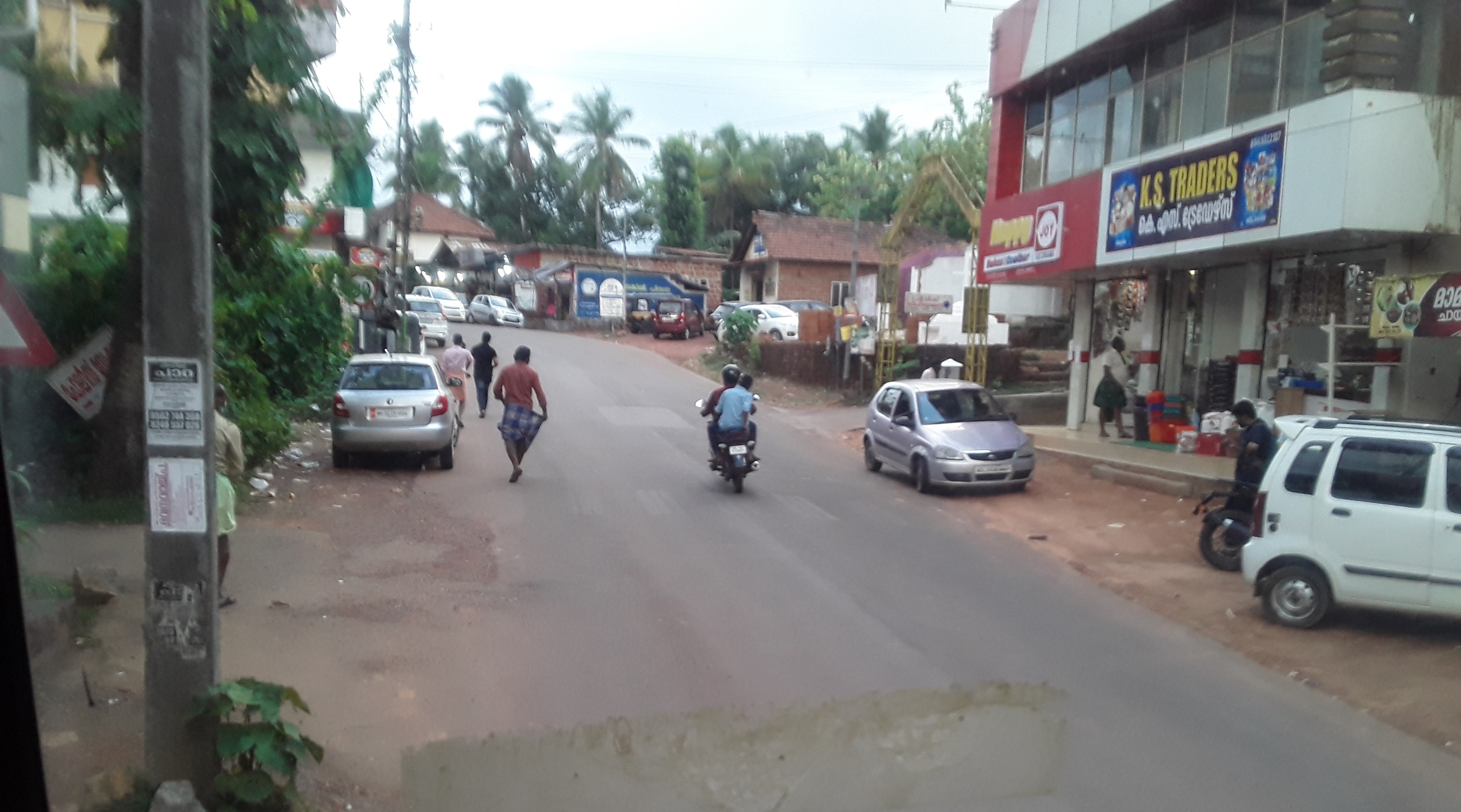
Kelakam Town

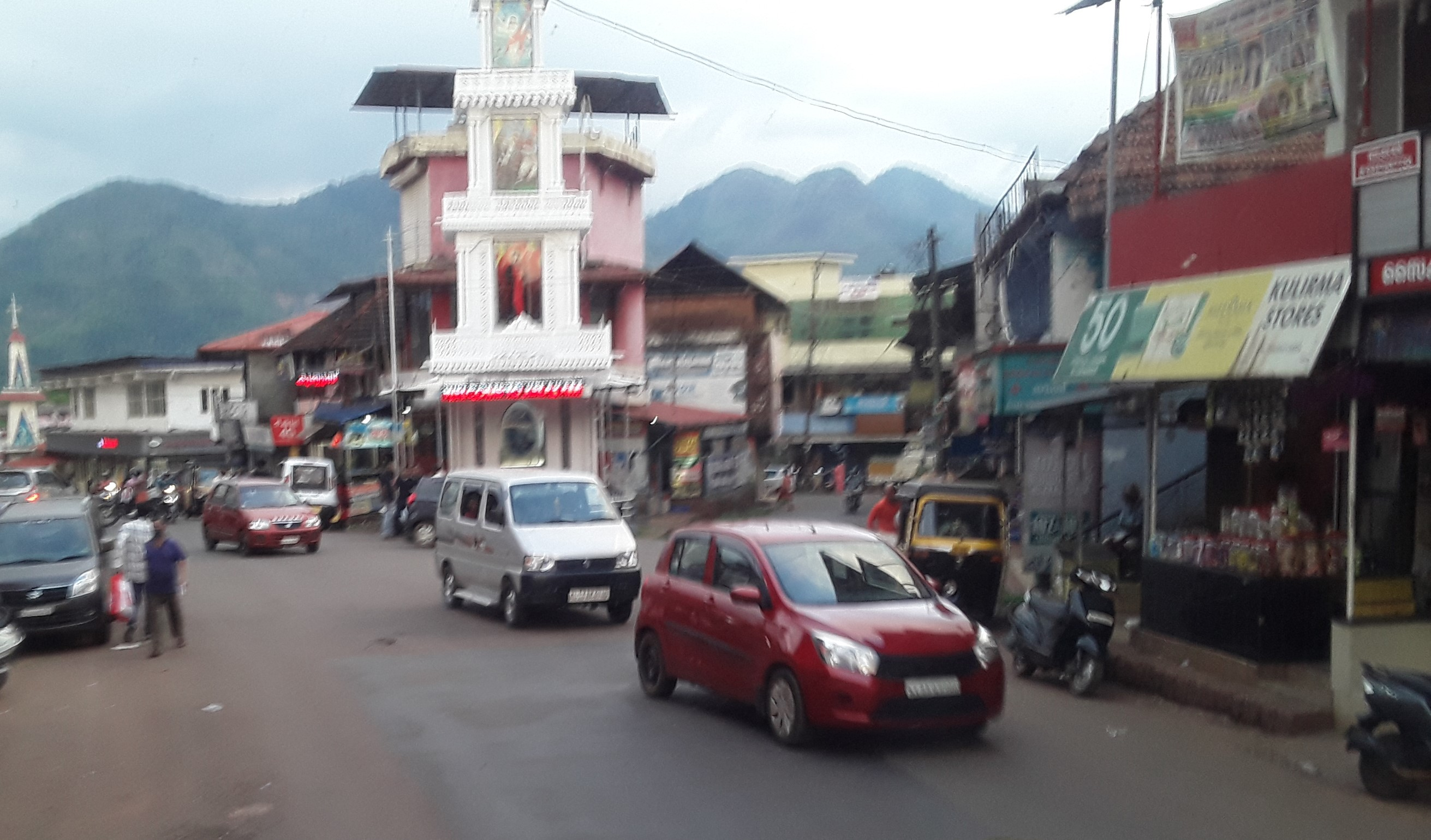
Kelakam Town

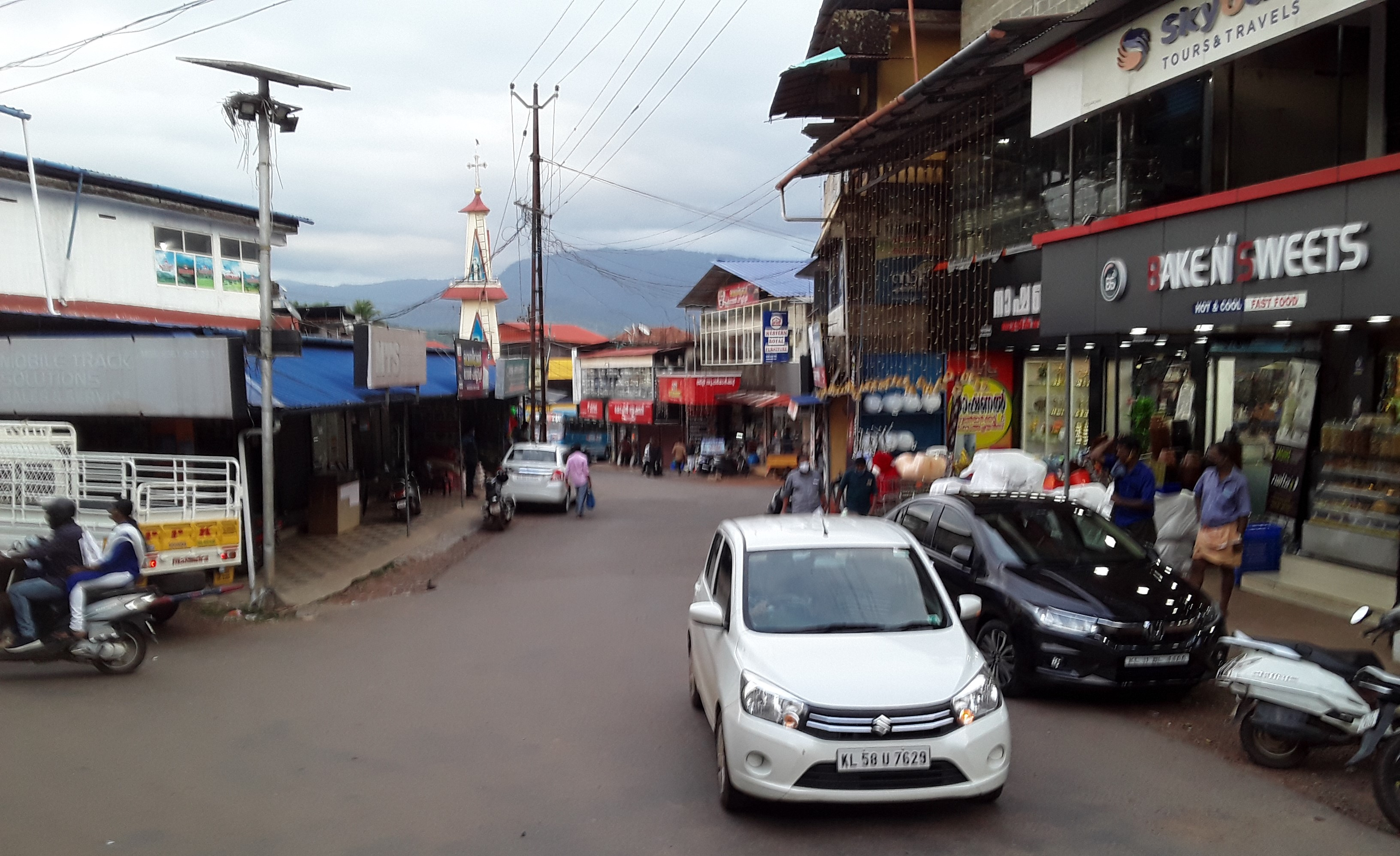
Kelakam Town
