= Kanichar =

- Village
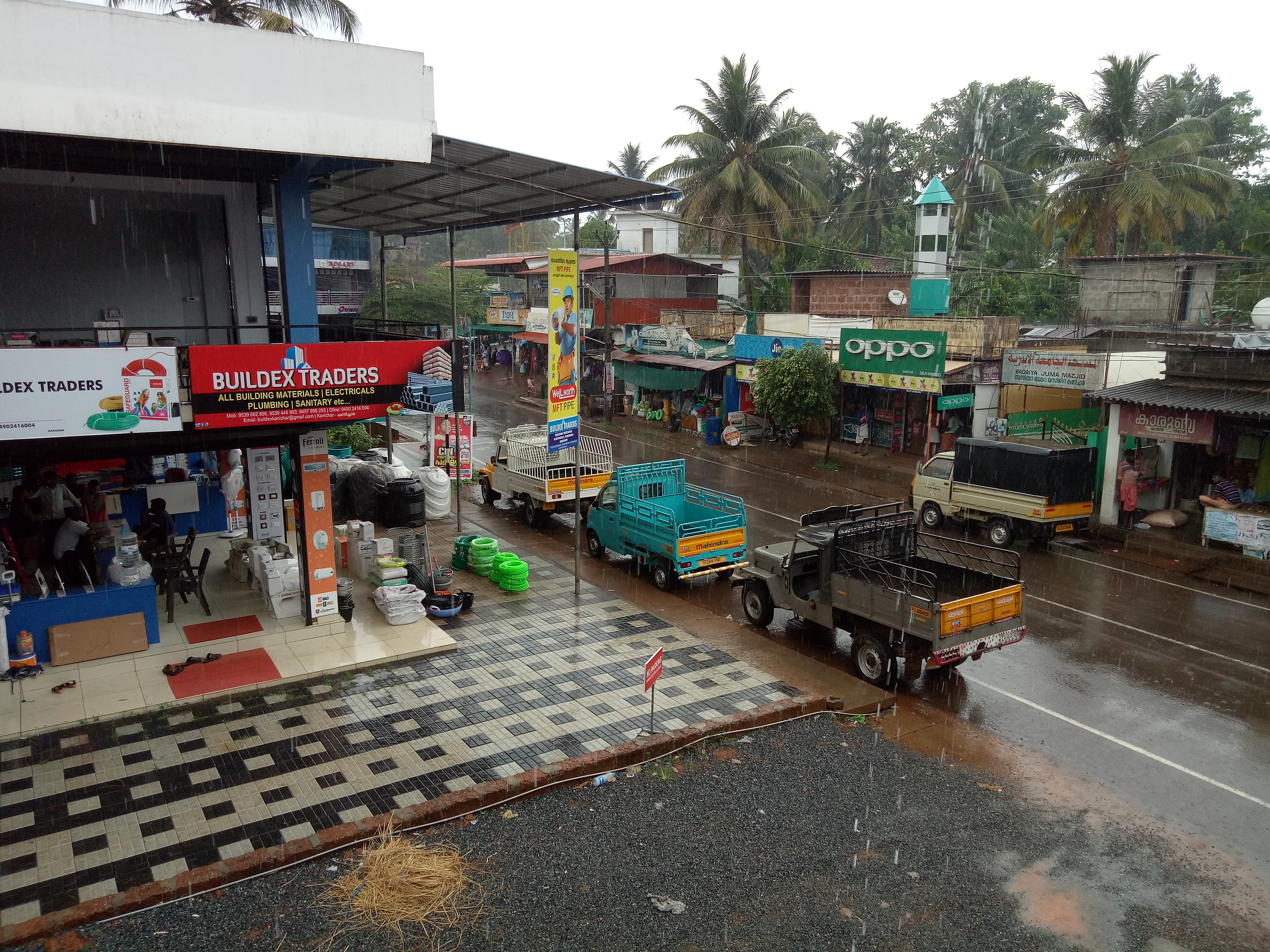
- Kanichar town

- Location in Kerala, India Kanichar (India)
- Coordinates: 11°54′18.1″N 75°47′4.3″E
- Country: India
- State: Kerala
- District: Kannur
- Taluk: Iritty

Government
  - Type: Panchayati raj (India)
  - Body: Kanichar Grama Panchayat

Area
  - Total: 51.96 km^{2} (20.06 sq mi)
- Elevation: 102 m (335 ft)

Population (2011)
  - Total: 15,789
  - Density: 303.9/km^{2} (787.0/sq mi)

Languages
  - Official: Malayalam, English
- Time zone: UTC+5:30 (IST)
- PIN: 670674
- Telephone code: 0490
- ISO 3166 code: IN-KL
- Vehicle registration: KL-78
- Nearest cities: Thalassery, Kannur
- Niyamasabha constituency: Peravoor
- Lok Sabha constituency: Kannur
- Climate: Mild Climate (Köppen)
- Website: http://lsgkerala.in/kanicharpanchayat

Kanichar is a small town and Grama Panchayat in Kannur district in the Indian state of Kerala.

== Demographics ==
As of 2011 Census, Kanichar had a population of 15,789 which constitutes 7,778 males and 8,011 females. Kanichar village spreads over an area of 51.96 km^{2} (20.06 sq mi) with 3,838 families residing in it. The sex ratio of Kanichar was 1,030 lower than state average of 1,084. Population of children in the age group 0-6 was 1,508 (9.55%) where 764 are males and 744 are females. Kanichar had an overall literacy of 93.1% lower than state average of 94%. The male literacy stands at 95% and female literacy was 91.2%.

== Wards ==
There are 13 wards in Kanichar Panchayat.

- Odanthode
- Anungode
- Kanichar
- Velloonni
- Nellikkunnu
- Chengom
- Elapeedika
- Poolakkutty
- Nedumpuramchal
- Odappuzha
- Kolakkad
- Mavadi
- Chanappara.

== Transportation ==
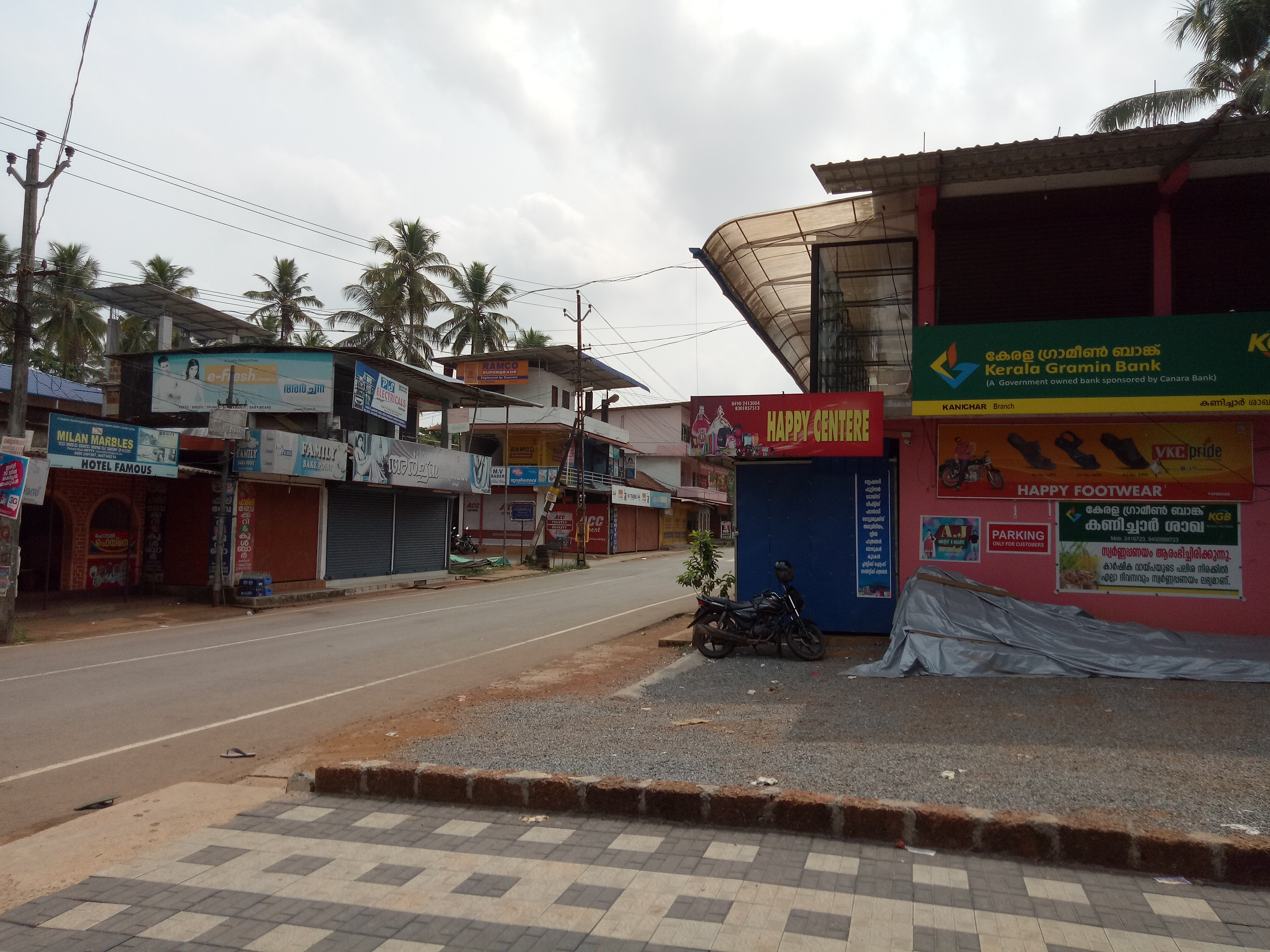
Kanichar town

The National Highway 66 passes through Kannur town. Mangalore and Mumbai can be accessed on the northern side and Cochin and Thiruvananthapuram can be accessed on the southern side. The road to the east of Iritty connects to Mysore and Bangalore. The nearest railway station is Kannur on Mangalore-Palakkad line. The nearest airport is Kannur International Airport which is 35 kilometers away from Kanichar.
