= Nuchiyad =

- village
- Location in Kerala, India Nuchiyad (India)
- Coordinates: 12°2′15″N 75°38′25″E
- Country: India
- State: Kerala
- District: Kannur

Government
  - Body: Ulikkal Grama Panchayat

Area
  - Total: 30.03 km^{2} (11.59 sq mi)

Population (2011)
  - Total: 12,686
  - Density: 422.4/km^{2} (1,094/sq mi)

Languages
  - Official: Malayalam, English
- Time zone: UTC+5:30 (IST)
- Postal code: 670705
- ISO 3166 code: IN-KL

Nuchiyad is a village in Kannur district in the Indian state of Kerala.

== Demographics ==
As of 2011 Census, Nuchiyad village had population of 12,686, of which 6,250 are males and 6,436 are females. Nuchiyad village spreads over an area of 30.03 km^{2} (11.59 sq mi) with 2,997 families residing in it. The sex ratio of Nuchiyad was 1,029 lower than state average of 1,084. Population of children in the age group 0-6 was 1,322 (10.4%) where 668 are males and 654 are females. Nuchiyad had an overall literacy of 94.1 where male literacy stands at 96.6% and female literacy was 91.7%.

== Transportation ==
The national highway passes through Kannur town. Mangalore and Mumbai can be accessed on the northern side and Cochin and Thiruvananthapuram can be accessed on the southern side. The road to the east of Iritty connects to Mysore and Bangalore.

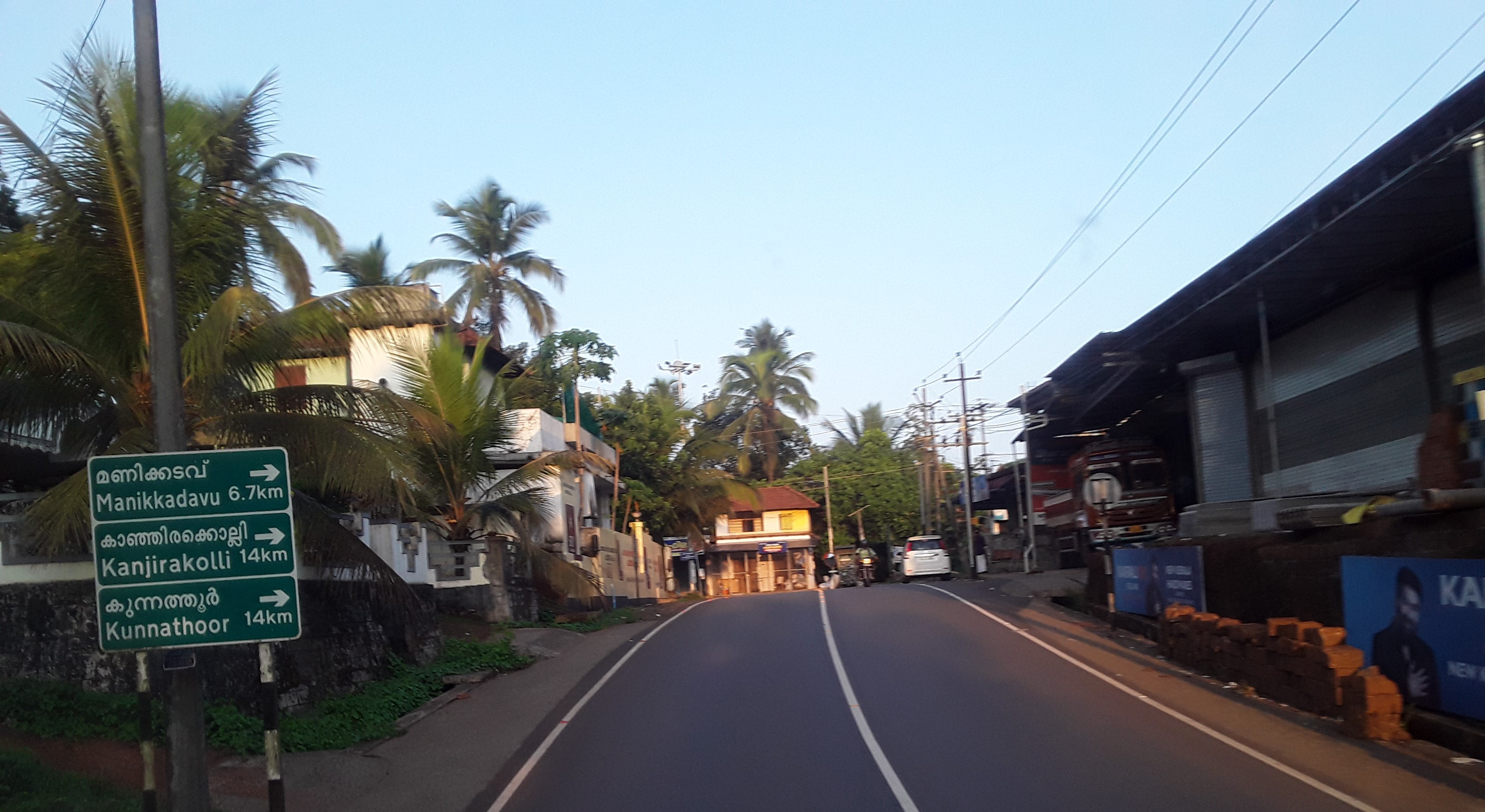
Hill Highway in Nuchiyad

Kerala Hill Highway (SH 59) passes through Nuchiyad village and connects nearby towns like Ulikkal, Iritty, and Payyavoor. The nearest railway station is Kannur on the Mangalore-Palakkad line. There are airports at Mangalore and Calicut.
