= Ayippuzha =

- Village
- Location within Kerala Location within India
- Coordinates: 11°59′47″N 075°29′55″E
- Country: India
- State: Kerala
- District: Kannur
- Taluk: Iritty
- Grama Panchayat: Koodali

Languages
  - Official: Malayalam, English
- Time zone: UTC+5:30 (IST)
- PIN: 670595
- ISO 3166 code: IN-KL
- Vehicle registration: KL-58
- Lok Sabha: Kannur
- Assembly constituency: Mattanur

Ayippuzha is a hamlet near Pattannur in Kannur district, Kerala, India. It lies on the banks of the Irikkur River, in the south part of Pattannur. Economically and geographically, it is a part of the town of Irikkur, in the government records.

== Education ==
- Government Upper Primary School, Ayippuzha
- AMI English Medium School (under supervision of Ayippuzha Jumah Mahal committee)

== Administration ==
Ayippuzha is part of Pattannur revenue village, Koodali Grama Panchayat and Iritty Block Panchayat. It falls under Mattanur Assembly constituency and Kannur Parliament constituency.

== Banks ==
There are four banks in Ayippuzha:

- Pattanoor Co operative bank
- Pattanoor Co operative bank Evening Branch
- Koodali Public Servants Society
- Mattannoor Cooperative Rural Bank
- Mattannoor Cooperative Rural Bank Evening Branch.

== Govt Offices ==
The Public Works Department (PWD), Irikkur section office is located at Ayippuzha near Irikkur bridge. Ayippuzha is home to a government UP school as well.

== Transportation ==
The national highway passes through Taliparamba town. Mangalore and Mumbai can be accessed on the northern side and Cochin and Thiruvananthapuram can be accessed on the southern side. The road to the east connects to Mysore and Bangalore. The nearest railway station is Kannur on Mangalore-Palakkad line. There are airports at Kannur, Mangalore and Calicut.
