= First Vijayan ministry =

2016–2021 government of Kerala, India

- 22nd Ministry of Kerala
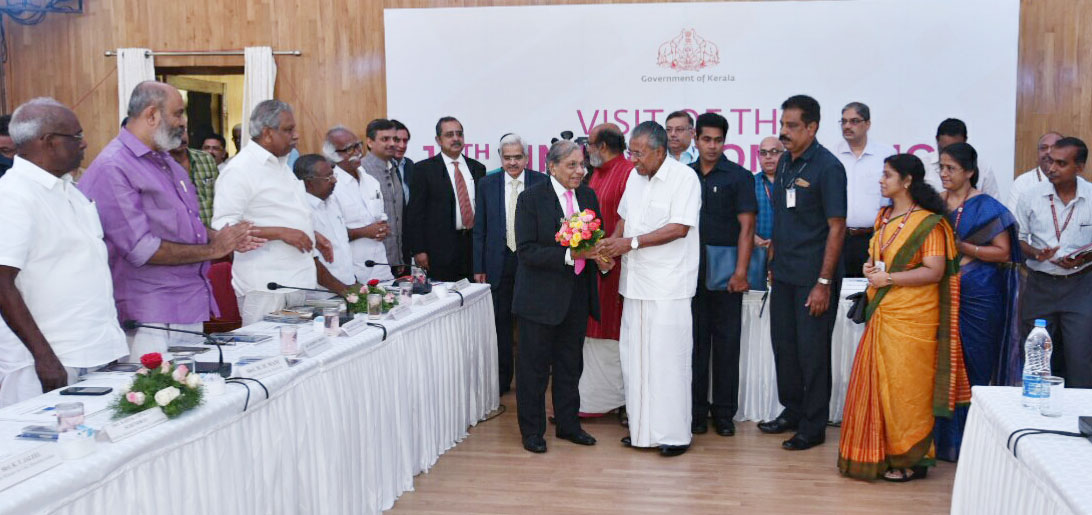
- Pinarayi Vijayan with N. K. Singh, the Chairman of the 15th Finance Commission along with other ministers in Thiruvananthapuram, 2018
- Date formed: 25 May 2016
- Date dissolved: 3 May 2021

People and organisations
- Head of state: P. Sathasivam (till 5 September 2019); Arif Mohammed Khan (from 6 September 2019)
- Head of government: Pinarayi Vijayan
- Member parties: LDF
- Status in legislature: Majority
- Opposition party: UDF
- Opposition leader: Ramesh Chennithala

History
- Election: 2016
- Legislature term: 5 years
- Predecessor: Second Oommen ministry
- Successor: Second Vijayan ministry

First Pinarayi Vijayan ministry is the Council of Ministers headed by Pinarayi Vijayan that was formed after the Left Democratic Front (LDF) won the 2016 Kerala Legislative Assembly elections. The Council assumed office on 25 May 2016. The ministry had a total of 19 ministers in the Cabinet at the time of swearing-in compared to 21 ministers in the previous government. Pinarayi Vijayan sworn in as 22nd Chief Minister of Kerala, 12th person to hold this position. Chief Minister Pinarayi Vijayan on 3 May 2021 submitted the resignation of the Council of Ministers headed by him to Governor Arif Mohammed Khan after winning a historic victory in the 15th legislative assembly elections by winning 99 of the 140 seats in the Assembly.

== Council of Ministers ==
S.No	Name	Constituency	Department	Party
1.	Pinarayi Vijayan; Chief Minister	Dharmadam	Home.; General Administration.; All India Services.; Planning and Economic Affairs.; Science, Technology, and Environment.; Scientific Institutes.; Personnel and Administrative Reforms.; Election.; Integration.; Sainik Welfare.; Distress Relief.; State Hospitality.; Airports.; Metro Rail.; Inter-State River Waters.; Information and Public Relations.; Non-Resident Keralites Affairs.; Vigilance.; Administration of Civil and Criminal Justice.; Prisons and Correctional Services.; Fire and Rescue Services.	CPI(M)
Cabinet Ministers
2.	E. Chandrasekharan	Kanhangad	Housing.; Land Revenue.; Survey and Land Records.; Land Reforms.	CPI
3.	E. P. Jayarajan	Mattanur	Industries.; Sports and Youth Affairs.	CPI(M)
4.	A. K. Balan	Tarur	Welfare of Scheduled Castes.; Scheduled Tribes and Backward Classes.; Law.; Culture.; Parliamentary Affairs.; KSFDC.	CPI(M)
5.	C.Raveendranath	Puthukkad	General Education.; Technical Education.; Entrance Examinations.; Literacy Movement.; National Cadet Corps.	CPI(M)
6.	Kadakampally Surendran	Kazhakkoottam	Devaswoms.; Co-operation.; Tourism.	CPI(M)
7.	M. M. Mani	Udumbanchola	Electricity	CPI(M)
8.	T. P. Ramakrishnan	Perambra	Excise.; Labour.; Employment and Training.; Rehabilitation.; Factories and Boilers.; Insurance Medical Service.; Industrial Tribunals.; Labour Courts.	CPI(M)
9.	J. Mercykutty Amma	Kundara	Fisheries.; Harbour Engineering.; Cashew Industry.; Fisheries University.	CPI(M)
10.	G. Sudhakaran	Ambalappuzha	Public Works.; Registration.; Post and Telegraphs.; Railways	CPI(M)
11.	K. K. Shailaja	Kuthuparamba	Health.; Family Welfare.; Medical Education.; Indigenous Medicine.; Medical University.; Drugs Control.; Pollution Control.; Homoeopathy.; Naturopathy.; Social Justice.	CPI(M)
12.	A. C. Moideen	Kunnamkulam	Panchayats, Municipalities and Corporations.; Rural Development.; Town planning.; Regional Development Authorities.; Kerala Institute of Local Administration.	CPI(M)
13.	T. M. Thomas Isaac	Alappuzha	Finance.; Coir.; National Savings.; Stores Purchase.; Commercial Taxes.; Treasuries.; Lotteries.; State Audit.; Kerala Financial Corporation.; KSFE.; State Insurance.; Stamps And Stamp Duties.	CPI(M)
14.	K. T. Jaleel	Thavanur	Universities (Except Agricultural, Veterinary, Fisheries and Medical University).; Collegiate Education.; Welfare of Minorities.; Wakf and Haj Pilgrimage.	IND
15.	V. S. Sunil Kumar	Thrissur	Agriculture.; Soil Survey & soil Conservation.; Agricultural university.; Warehousing Corporation.; Veterinary university.	CPI
16.	P. Thilothaman	Cherthala	Food and Civil Supplies.; Consumer Affairs.; Legal Metrology.	CPI
17.	K. Raju	Punalur	Forests.; Wildlife Protection.; Animal husbandry.; Dairy Development.; Milk- Co-operatives.; Zoos.	CPI
18.	K. Krishnankutty	Chittur	Irrigation.; Command Area Development Authority.; Ground Water Development.; Water Supply and Sanitation.; Inland Navigation (Construction of Waterways).; Kerala Shipping and Inland Navigation Corporation.	JD(S)
19.	A. K. Saseendran	Elathur	Road Transport.; Motor Vehicles.; Water Transport.	NCP
20.	Kadannappalli Ramachandran	Kannur	Ports.; Museums.; Archaeology.	C(S)

== Chair and chief whip ==
	Name	Position	Constituency	District	Party
1	P. Sreeramakrishnan	Speaker	Ponnani	Malappuram	CPI(M)
2	V. Sasi	Deputy Speaker	Chirayinkeezhu	Thiruvananthapuram	CPI

	Name	Position	Constituency	District	Party
1	K. Rajan	Chief Whip	Ollur	Thrissur	CPI

== Ministers by party ==
Representation of cabinet ministers by party
1. Communist Party of India (Marxist) (60.0%)
2. Communist Party of India (20.0%)
3. Nationalist Congress Party (5.00%)
4. Janata Dal (Secular) (5.00%)
5. Congress (Secular) (5.00%)
6. Independent politician (5.00%)

Party	Cabinet ministers
Communist Party of India (Marxist)	12
Communist Party of India	4
Nationalist Congress Party	1
Janata Dal (Secular)	1
Congress (Secular)	1
Independent politician	1

== Ex-Ministers ==
- E. P. Jayarajan (CPI(M)) – Minister for Industries and Sports until his resignation on 14 October 2016 because of charges of nepotism. In September 2017, the Vigilance and Anti-Corruption Bureau (VACB) acquitted Jayarajan in the nepotism case and sought to close the case. Jayarajan was re-inducted into the cabinet on 14 August 2018.
- A. K. Saseendran (NCP) – Minister for Transport from 25 May 2016 until his resignation on 26 March 2017 after a sting operation revealed him seeking sexual favours from a woman. In November 2017, Saseendran received a clean chit from the inquiry commission which said that it had no conclusive evidence before it to prove the charge.
- Thomas Chandy (NCP) – Minister for Transport (from 1 April 2017 to 15 November 2017). The businessman-turned-politician resigned over allegations that he had encroached on water bodies and public land and converted paddy fields for a private hotel project. He died on 20 December 2019.
- Mathew T. Thomas (Janata Dal (Secular)) – Minister for Water Resources until his resignation on 26 November 2018.
- K. T. Jaleel - Minister for Higher Education and Minority Welfare - resigned in April 2021 following Lokayukta finding him guilty on nepotism charges.

== Awards and appreciation ==
The Kerala government under the leadership of Pinarayi Vijayan won the following awards:

- Recognised as the best governed state in India by Public Affairs Centre for three consecutive years (2016, 2017, 2018)
- Ranked first in United Nations Sustainable Development Index (2018, 2019) released by NITI Ayog and UN
- Ranked first in NITI Aayog Sustainable Development Index
- Second least corrupt state as per the Centre for Media Studies (2018)
- Pradhan Mantri Surakshit Matritva Abhiyan Award for the state with lowest maternal mortality
- UN Inter-Agency Task Force on the Prevention and Control of Non-communicable Diseases (UNIATF) award 2020
- Kerala Number 1 in overall health index: NITI Aayog
- Kerala ranks fifth in NITI Aayog's Innovation Index
- First in the National School Education (NSE) Index by the NITI Aayog
- Kerala Tops in New Migrant Policy Index
- Kerala tops NITIAayog's School Education Quality Index
- Kerala was ranked 1 in overall performance of state in health outcomes index
- Kerala feature in the top ten rankings in NITI Aayog releases report on Export Preparedness Index 2020
- Kerala was adjudged the best-governed state in the country, according to the Public Affairs Index-2020 released by the Public Affairs Centre

== Notable work ==
- Built over 2,00,000 houses for the homeless and landless under Life mission (launched in 2017).
- 28,000 houses were completed as part of Livelihood Inclusion and Financial Empowerment, a comprehensive housing scheme for all the landless and homeless in the state.
- Implemented a comprehensive development scheme and was therefore ranked first in United Nations Sustainable Development Index (2018) and NITI Aayog Sustainable Development Index.
- Took over and completed the previously deserted Edamon- Kochi 400 KV transmission line.
- Re-hauling the Public sector enterprise, Kerala Automobiles Limited and successfully spearheaded the effort to start commercial-scale production of Kerala's own e-auto Neem-G, marking the first time a public sector venture entering the Electric Vehicle market.
- Successfully planned and implemented the "apna Ghar" scheme that provides state of the art housing facilities for migrant workers .
- Successfully brought in 165 companies to IT park creating 50,000 jobs within 1000 days.
- Reduced overall loss of Public Sector companies which stood at Rs. 131.0 crores in 2015–16 to Rs. 71.34 crores in 2016–17 with making thirteen of them operating at a marginal profit in 2016–17. Within 1000 days of office, PSUs went from netting Rs. 131.0 crores in losses to over Rs. 160 Crore in profits .
- Established Institute of Advanced Virology (IAV) in the state and became the first in the country to be linked with the Global Virus Network.
- Doubled the social security pensions for the marginalised and elderly compared to the previous UDF government.
- Established minimum wage scheme in 26 sectors to prevent exploitation of employees.
- Successfully ensured minimum wages and social security measures for the migrant workers.
- 17182 km of rivers and streams that were stalled or contaminated were rejuvenated, 48936 wells were recharged and 9889 ponds reformed in the first 1000 days in office.
- 1,03,361 title deeds were distributed among various communities.
- Record growth of milk production increasing daily production by over 2,60,000 litres per day within 1000 days in power
- Education Department set up 45,000 hi-tech classrooms in public schools.
- Over 2000 Crore Indian rupees infused to rejuvenate the public school system.
- Witnessed exponential increase in number of students enrolled in public schools for all three years, the highest growth in past 25 years.
- Education Department has also ensured free textbooks and uniforms for all the students.
- Jana Maithri project implementation at all police stations.
- Haritha Kerala Mission projects implemented for waste management, organic farming and water resources management.
- Revived agrarian practice of the state through Agriculture Department by cultivating paddy cultivation in 34,000 acres of land, and building new traditions like "Year of Paddy."
- Created innovative and accessible educational programs that gives youth employment ready skills and competence through Kerala Academy for Skill Excellence (KASE).
- Reduced class division especially by appointing non-Brahmins and Dalits as priests in temples under the Travancore Devaswom Board (TDB).
- Committed to increasing state's power sources and consumption, in the meantime by stopping power cuts and load shedding and by initiating hydro-electric power projects in Vellathooval, Pathankayam, Perunthenaruvi, Pallivasal, Thottiyar and Chathankottunada.
- Rebuild Kerala Initiative.
- Conducting studies to develop new tourism spots and renovating existing ones to create employment and taxation opportunities.
- Abolishing an illegal practice among worker class known as "nokkukooli" — a money extortion formality that were held by certain labour unions without doing any work.
- Implementing Road infrastructure projects – Coastal Highway and Hill Highway (Kerala).
- Acquired land for Amballur Electronic Hardware Park for developing a new source for economic growth and creating job opportunities/increasing purchasing power of citizens.
- Implementing GAIL pipeline between Mangalore and Kochi, a national project.
- Completion of Kollam Bypass Alappuzha Bypass in National Highway 66. Speeding up and completion of land acquisition for National Highway 66 from Thalappady, Kasaragod to Ramanattukara with commencements of work.
- Completion of overpass at Vyttila, Kundannoor, and rebuilding controversial Palarivattom Flyover.
- Announcing Kochi Water Metro and commencement of works.
- The DPR of Thiruvananthapuram–Kasargode Semi High Speed Rail Corridor(K-RAIL) submitted to central government after completing environment impact study.
- Established Kerala Administrative Service in 2018.

- In first of its kind in Kerala, his ministry introduced a yearly progress report to mark accountability and transparency of the ruling front. The report contained the evaluation and performance of the ministry with respect to the promises in the election manifesto released by Left Democratic Front. His ministry made history by keeping 570 of 600 poll promises mentioned in the election manifesto by December 2020.
- His ministry introduced four missions for building Nava Keralam, a project expected to have a transformational effect on Kerala in the long run. The missions include LIFE Mission, a project to solve the problems of all categories of people including the homeless and landless and those who could not complete their house construction after starting it. It completed more than 2 lakh homes for the homeless. The Ardram Mission aimed at a total overhaul of the public health sector making it people friendly, affordable for the poorest, and a means to provide substantial state of the art infrastructure facilities. It extended super specialty facilities that was earlier limited to medical colleges, to district and taluk hospitals as well. The Haritha Keralam Mission was a comprehensive project implemented to clear and remove waste from all the water bodies in Kerala; ponds, rivers, lakes and streams. The mission was a participatory program on the lines of literacy mission, democratic decentralization and people's planning and it involved the removal of solid waste, removal of waste water and measures to increase the area of land under cultivation are being undertaken under this project. The Education Mission, proposed comprehensive educational reforms including upgrading one thousand government schools into international standards during the first phase and steadily improved the infrastructure for the education in Kerala. Kerala thereafter became the first fully digital state in the country in the field of public education, with the completion of the ‘hi-tech classroom and hi-tech lab’ projects in government-owned schools.

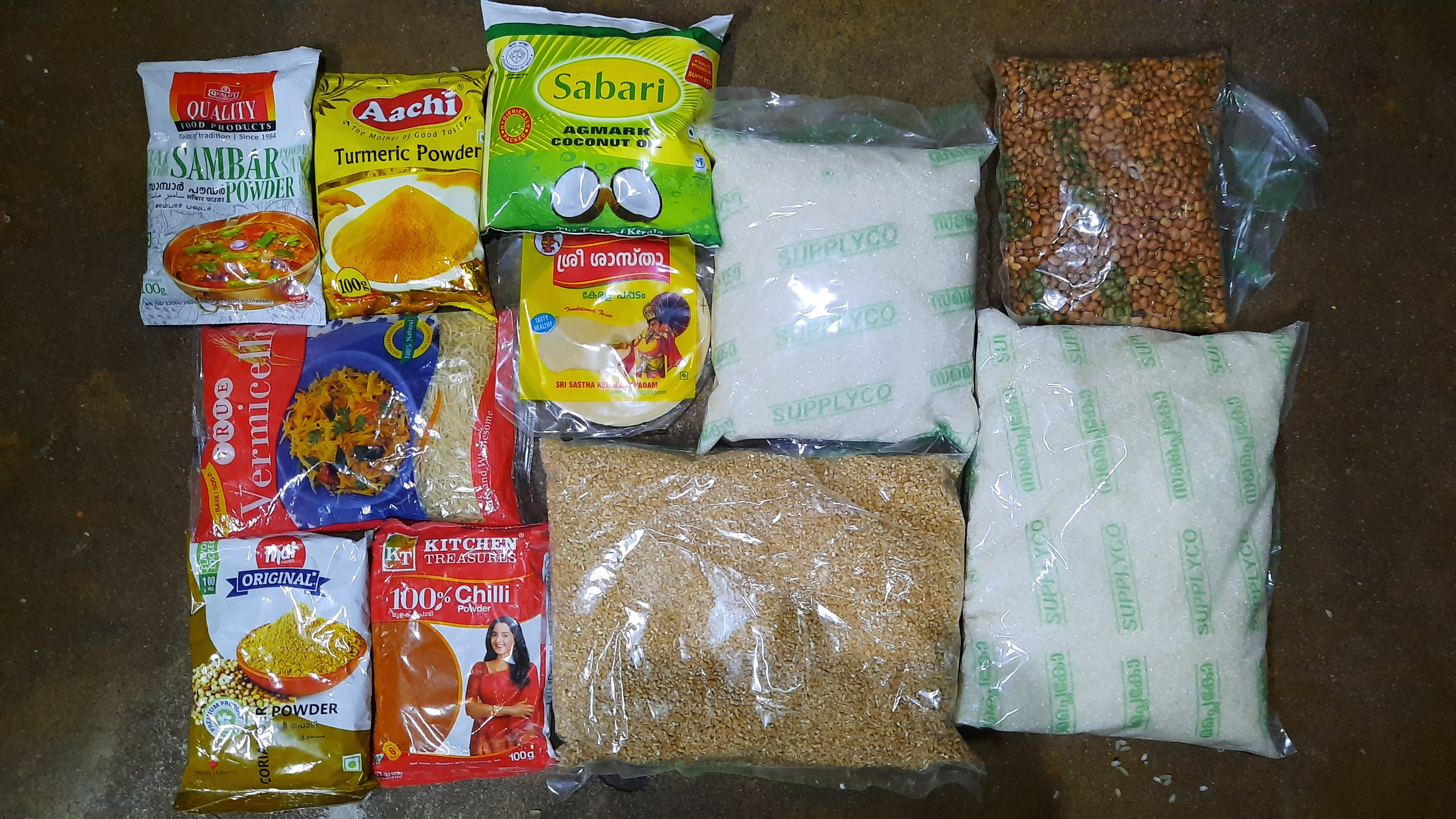
Food kit distributed during COVID-19 pandemic in Kerala by the state government

- His ministry offered 1,03,361 title deeds for landless people, found 22,000 hectares for additional paddy cultivation, restored 17182 square kilometers of water bodies, distributed 8,500,000 free Handloom School Uniforms, built 45,000 high tech classrooms, ensured 341,293 new student enrollment in public schools and enlarged 5,000,000 sq.ft. as a newly built-up area for Information Technology.
- Kerala became the first state in India to provide employment reservation in rail network (Kochi Metro) for transgender people. His ministry also provided reservation for transgender students pursuing degrees in the Arts and Sciences in graduation and post graduation.
- For the first time in India, an all-woman police squad called 'Pink Patrol' was introduced in Kerala to ascertain the security of women and children in public places.
- His government formed Loka Kerala Sabha to bring Malayali diaspora living around the globe under one platform.
- His tenure saw Kerala becoming first fully electrified State and fully open-defecation-free State in India. The 'filament free state', a project to bring in affordable LED bulbs in all households in Kerala also received good public attention.
- He launched Kerala Bank and Kerala Administrative Service.
- He completed Kochi-Mangaluru natural gas pipeline, GAIL Pipeline project.
- During his tenure, completion of Alappuzha Bypass and Kollam Bypass was done which was overdue since 1970s.
- Kerala was ranked as the best governed state by Public Affairs Index, Excellence Award 2017 of Cops Today International.

== Political changes ==
- The ruling left democratic front (LDF) in the state has added four new political parties under its fold, becoming a 10-member strong front. The new entrants are Indian National League (INL), Loktantrik Janata Dal (LJD), Democratic Kerala Congress (DKC) and Kerala Congress (B).
- The Kerala Congress (M) joined Left Democratic Front in October 2020. This move have given inroads to LDF in Kottayam district and nearby areas with large number of Christian voters.
- In February 2021 ahead of the polls, the LDF Member of the Legislative Assembly from Pala (State Assembly constituency), Mani C. Kappan left the alliance and formed the Nationalist Congress Kerala leaving Nationalist Congress Party to contest elections from Pala on UDF ticket. The decision was due to the LDF's decision to give Pala seat to Kerala Congress (M) for the 2021 Kerala Legislative Assembly election. Mani C. Kappan the sitting MLA from Pala had won this seat in 2019 Kerala Legislative Assembly by-elections by defeating UDF and ending a 49 year long Kerala Congress streak in the constituency.

== Reception ==
- Sabarimala controversy.
- The UDF-led opposition alleged charges of nepotism.
- Sprinklr data controversy during COVID-19 pandemic.
- Life Mission controversy
- Kerala Public Service Commission row over delay of appointments from rank lists to permanent posts.
- Deep sea fishing controversy over deal between Kerala Industrial Development Corporation (KIDC) and EMCC International India Private Limited.
- Covid protocol violations.

== See also ==
- List of Kerala ministers
- Chief Ministers of Kerala
- History of Kerala
- List of current Indian chief ministers
- Pinarayi Vijayan
- Second Oommen Chandy ministry
