= Mattanur =

Mattanur Airport City of North Malabar
- Municipality
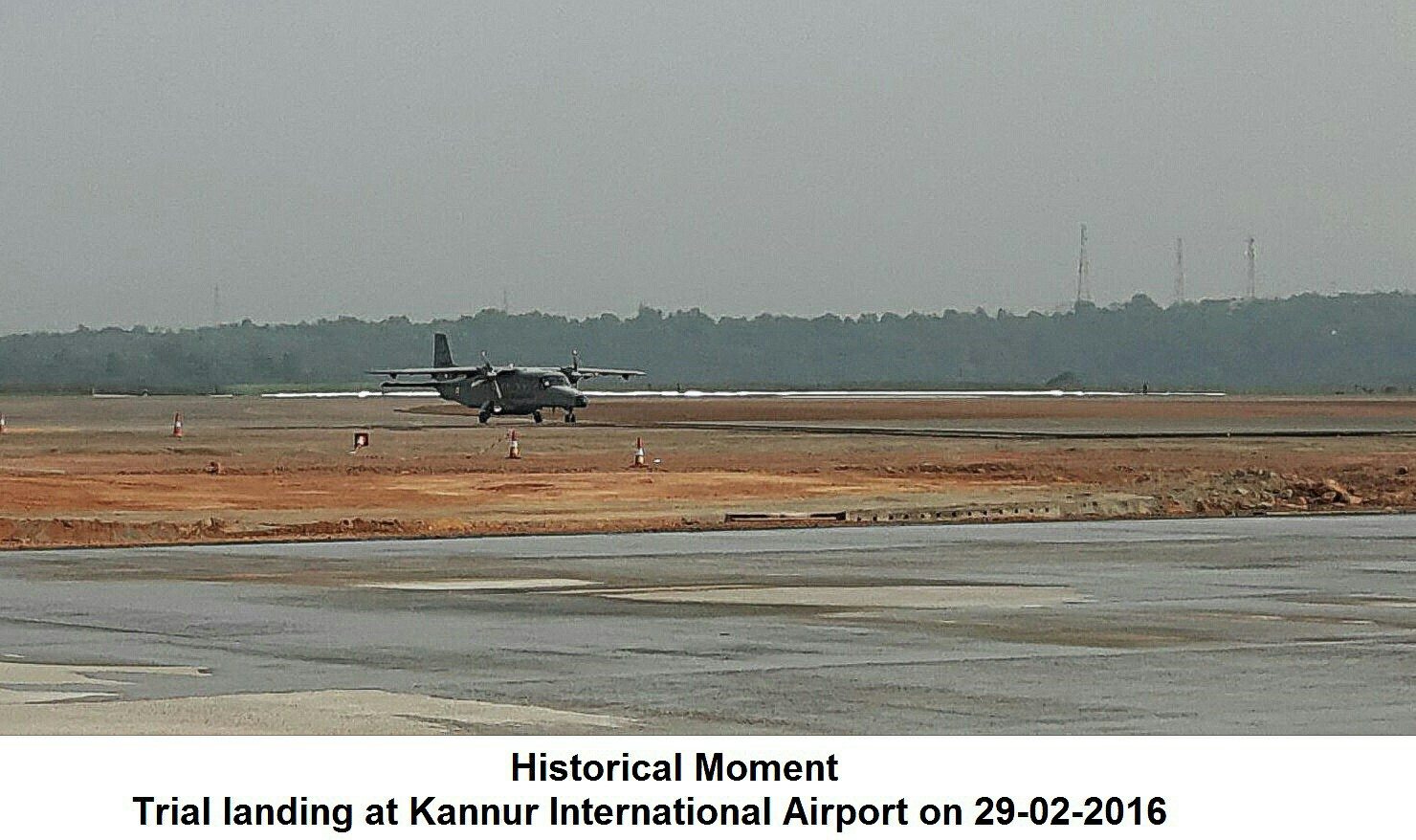
- Trial landing at Kannur Airport (aircraft: Dornier 228 of the Indian Air force)

- Location in Kerala, India Mattanur (India)
- Coordinates: 11.931°N 75.572°E
- Country: India
- State: Kerala
- District: Kannur
- Taluk: Iritty
- Municipality: 1 April 1990
- Named for: Kannur International Airport

Government
  - Type: Municipal Council
  - MLA: V. K. Sanoj
  - Municipal Chairman: N. Shajith

Area
  - Total: 54.32 km^{2} (20.97 sq mi)
- Elevation: 51 m (167 ft)

Population (2011)
  - Total: 47,078
  - Density: 866.7/km^{2} (2,245/sq mi)

Languages
  - Official: Malayalam, English
- Time zone: UTC+5:30 (IST)
- PIN: 670702
- Telephone code: 91-(0)490
- ISO 3166 code: IN-KL
- Vehicle registration: KL 78
- Niyamasabha Constituency: Mattanur
- Lok Sabha Constituency: Kannur
- Website: http://www.mattannurmunicipality.in/

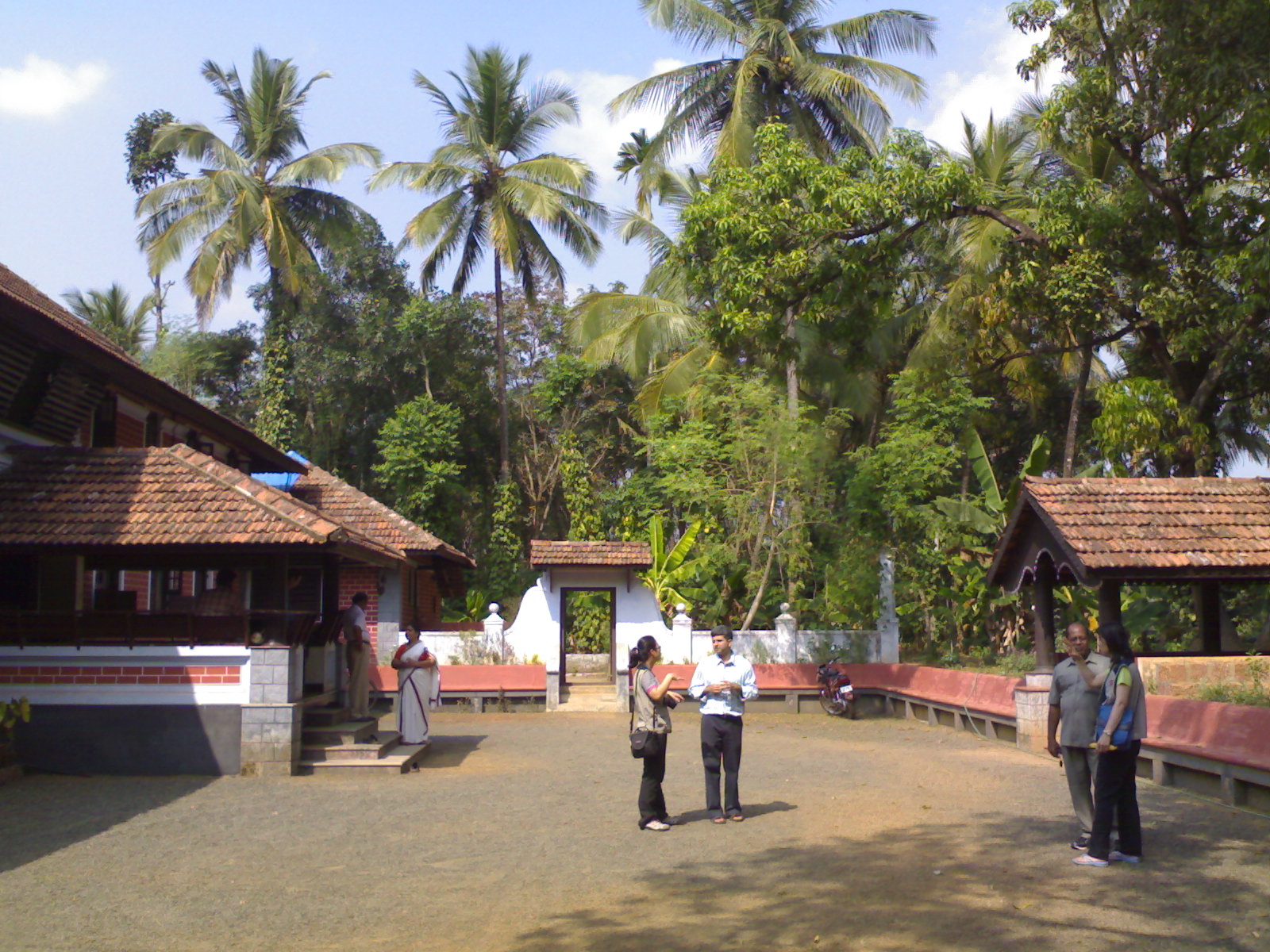
Korean visitors at a traditional Kerala house with Ettukettu architecture in Mattanur

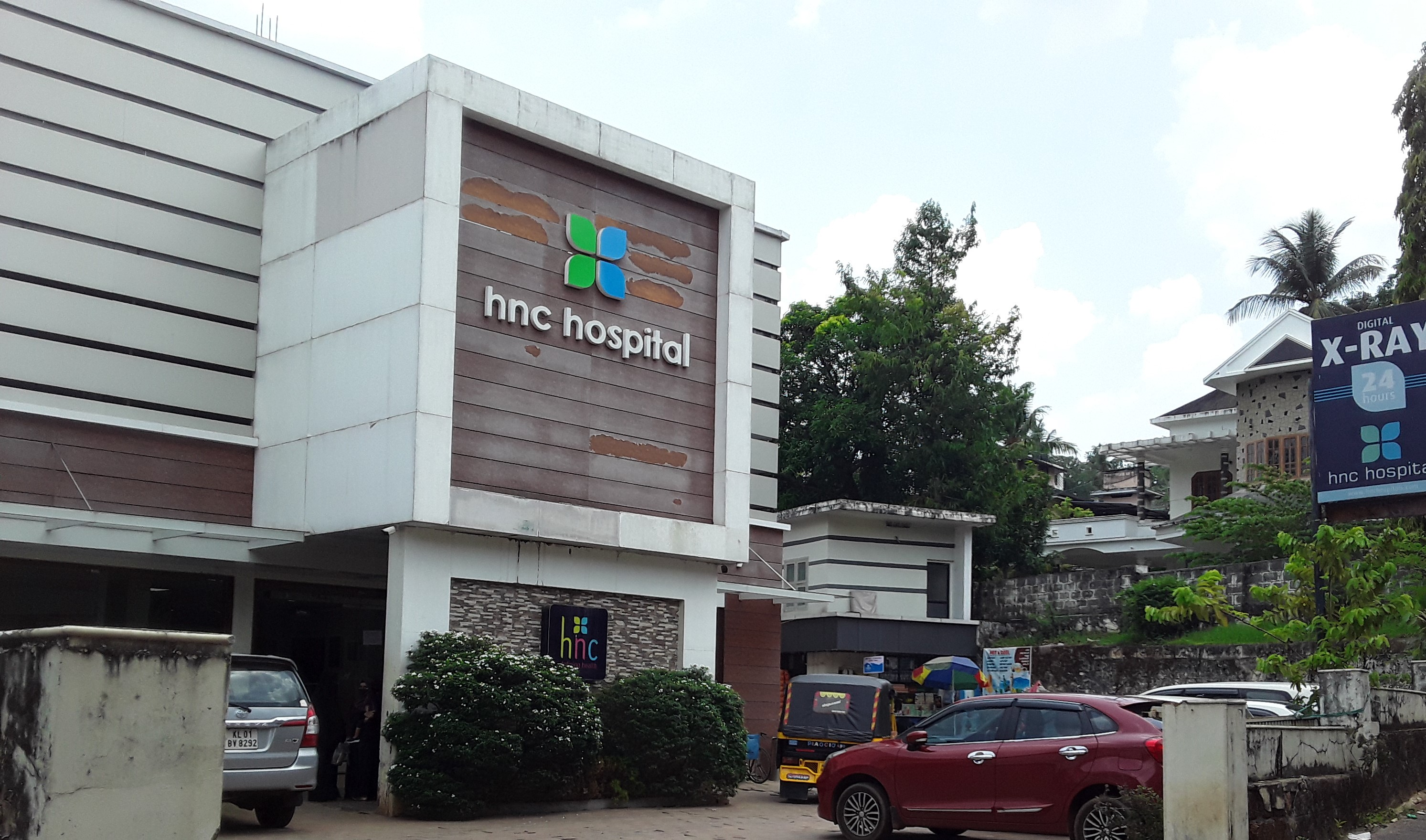
HNC hospital, mattanur

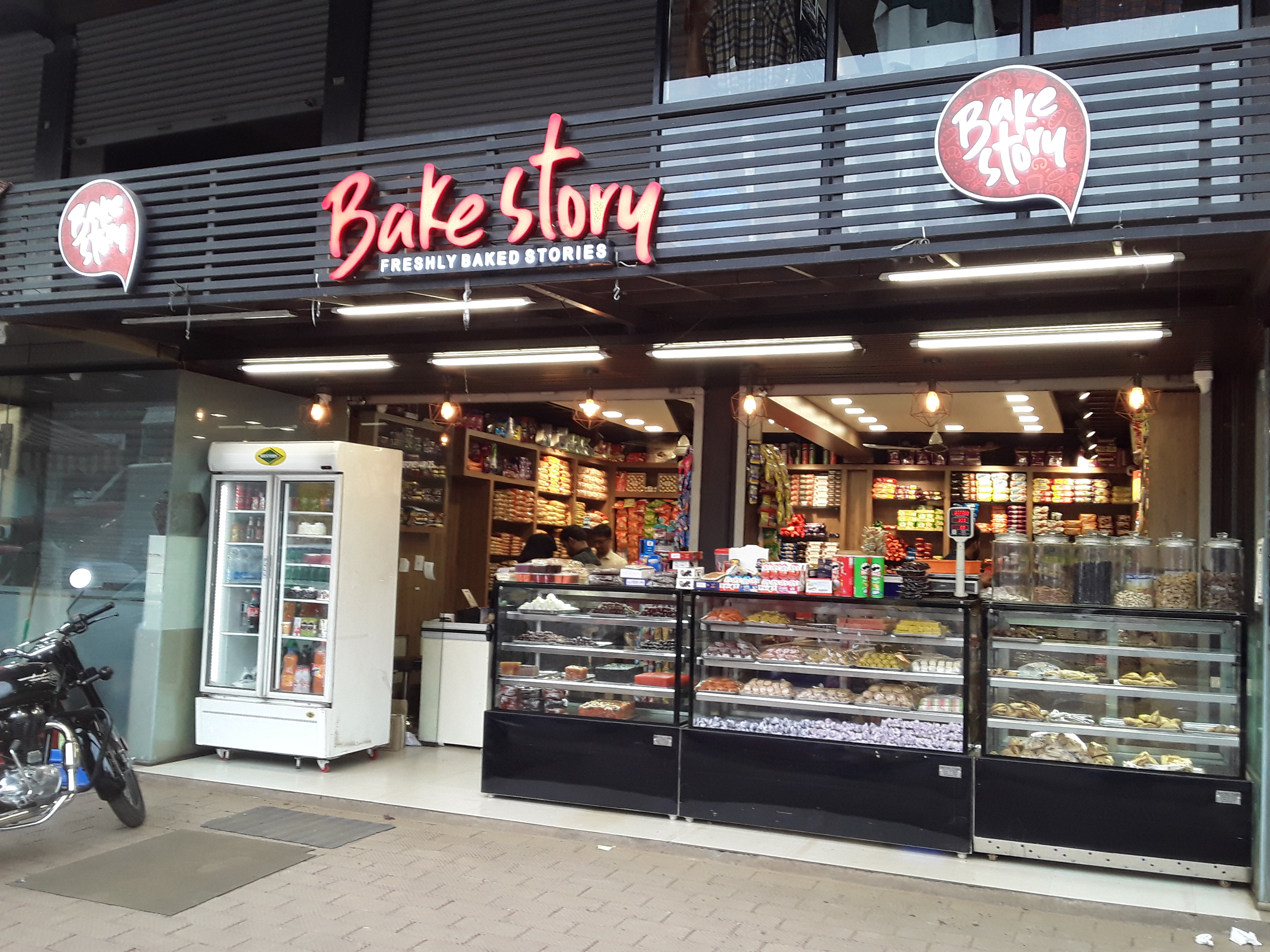
Mattannur town

Mattanur, also spelled as Mattannur, is a municipality and an aerotropolis situated in the midland region of Kannur district, Kerala, India. It is located about 27 km (17 mi) east of Kannur and 27 km (17 mi) northeast of Thalassery, two major towns in the district.

Mattanur lies between Kannur, Thalassery, and Iritty. It is the intersection where the Thalassery–Coorg Highway (popularly known as the TC Road) meets the Kannur–Mattanur Road. The inter-state buses travelling from Bangalore and Mysore to Thalassery and Kannur pass through Mattanur. It is an important hub, connecting Kodagu and Kannur. Kannur Airport is about 5 km (3.1 mi) from Mattanur.

== Location ==
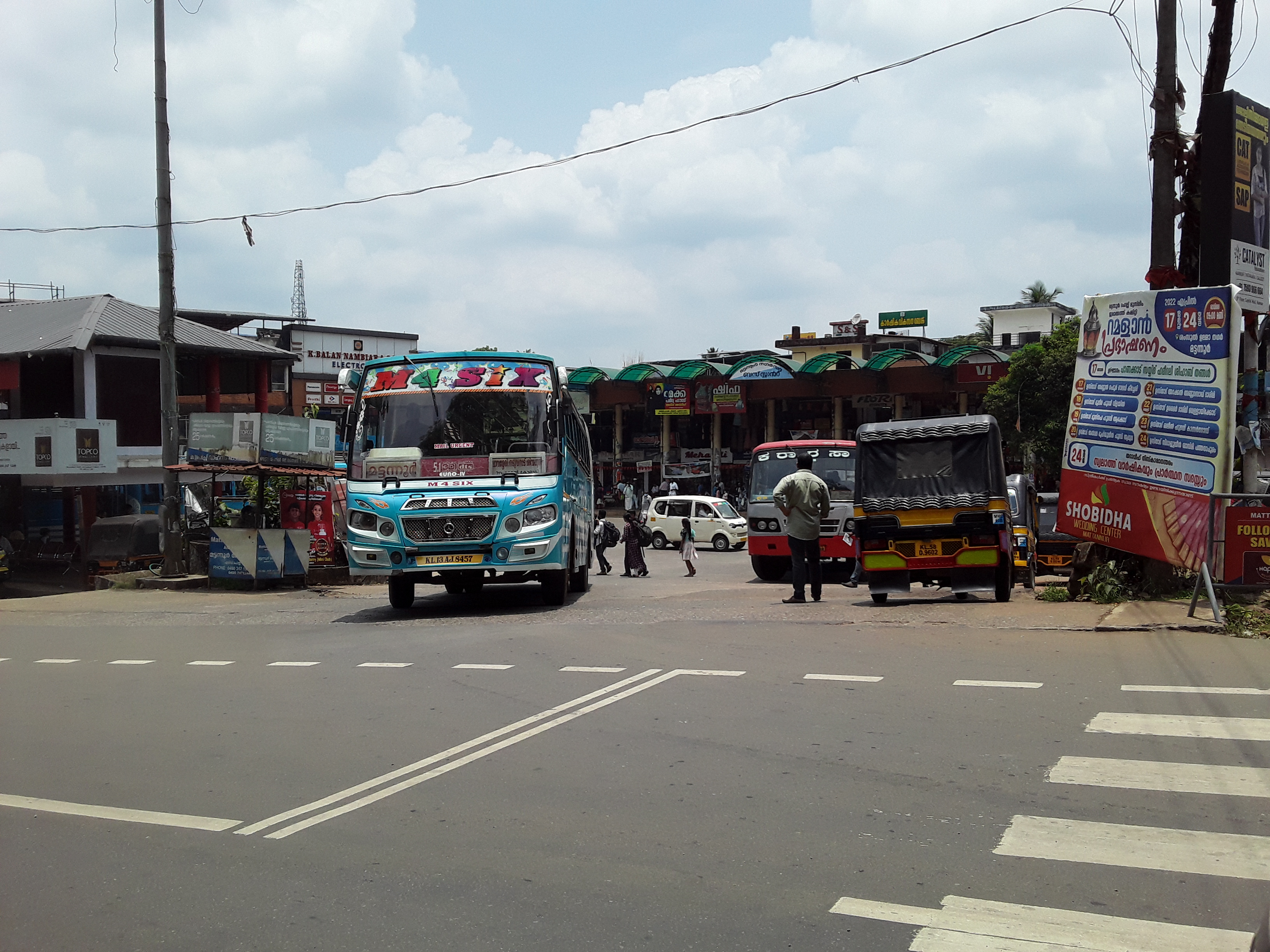
Mattanur bus station

Mattanur is located at the midland of the Kannur District at 11°55′N 74°35′E and stretches for about 4.8 km. It is surrounded by eight Panchayats and a municipality, namely Irikkur and Padiyur on the north side, Iritty (municipality), Thillankeri, and Malur on the east side, Mangattidam and Vengad on the south side, and Koodali and Keezhallur on the west side.

The town is located at about 500 km north of Thiruvananthapuram, the state capital, and about 27 km east of Kannur, the district headquarters. Kochi, known as commercial capital of Kerala, is about 280 km south and Kozhikode which is a major urban center of northern Kerala, is 93 km south of Mattanur. Mysore and Bangalore, two major cities of the state of Karnataka, are 153 km and 283 km east of Mattanur, respectively, and Mangalore is about 165 km away, towards the north.

== History ==
Historically, this area was under the rule of Kottayam royal family called the Puralisans. King Pazhassi Raja, who helped the English in the war against Tipu Sultan, had to fight against the English who had leased Kottayam to the King of Kurumbranad. The importance of this struggle is enhanced by the fact that masses of people of all castes, religions, farmers, traders and artisans joined Pazhassi in the struggle against the British. After the heroic death of Pazhassi in 1805, the British took over the administration and demolished Pazhassi fort.

There are many myths about the origin of the place. Some people say that Mattannur came from Motannur, which means the town of Mottakunn (Knoll). Another sect believes that Mattanur is an evolution of this area, which was recorded as Pattinikad in the old survey records.

Mattanur Panchayat came into existence in 1962 by joining Pazhassi, Kolari and Porora villages. The first election was held in 1963 and K. T Madhavan Nambiar was the first president. In 1978, the governing body was dissolved. The governing body came into existence in 1979 with Mukundan as the president of the Panchayat. In 1990, Mattanur was elevated as a municipality.

== Connectivity ==
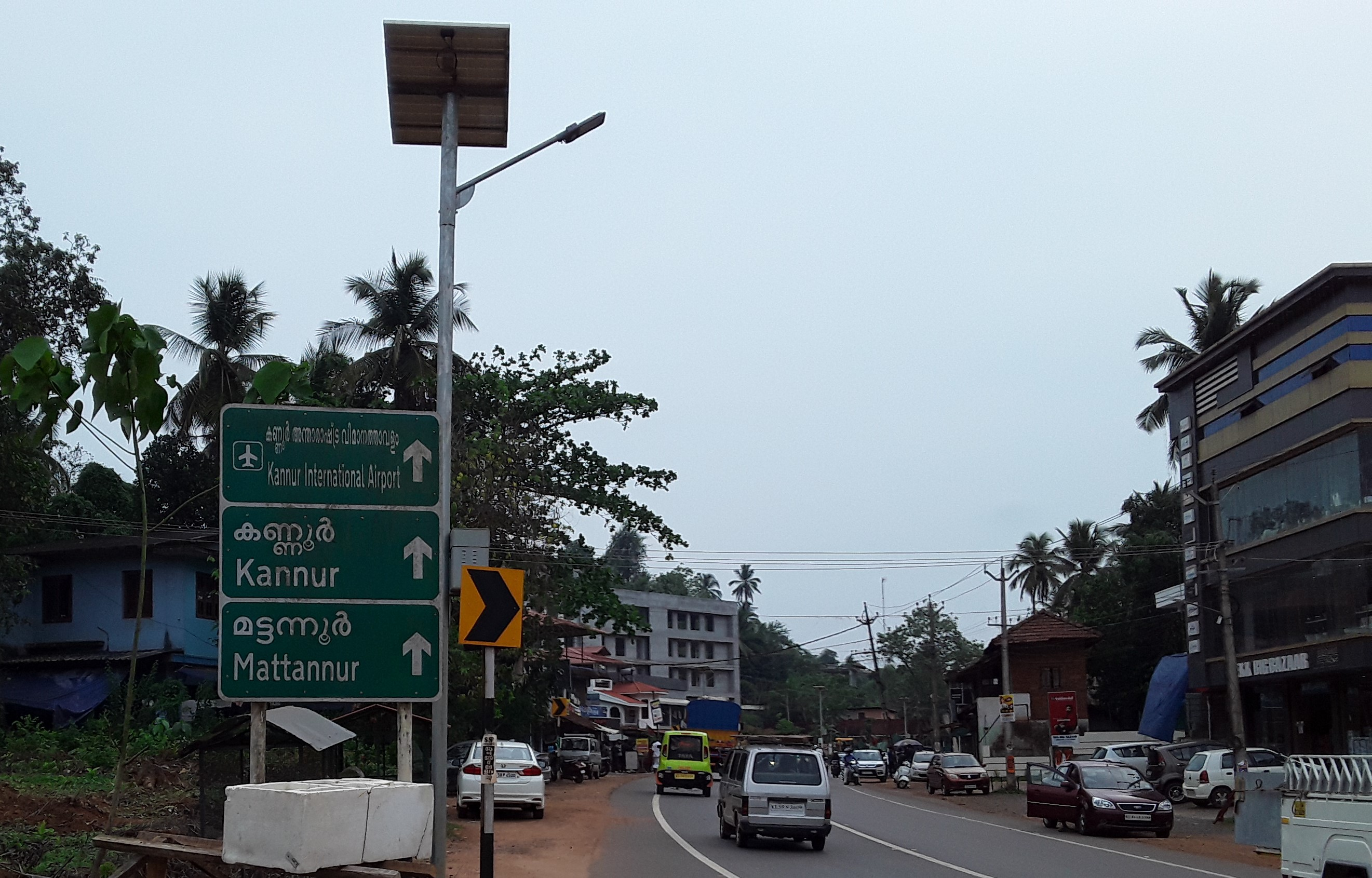
SH 30 in Mattanur

The Kannur International Airport is located 5 km (3.1 mi) away from the town and provides the opportunity of air connectivity. The town is well connected to the neighbouring towns of Kerala and Karnataka. SH 30, the Thalassery–Coorg Road, passes through the town and connects it to other nearby towns like Thalassery, Kuthuparamba, Iritty, and Madikeri. It also has linkages to cities like Mysore, Mangalore, Bangalore, Kozhikode, Kochi, and Thiruvananthapuram.

The proposed Kannur-Mysore National Highway under Bharatmala project, passes through Mattanur town facilitates access to major cities and towns in Kerala and Karnataka states.

The Mattanur–Maruthayi–Mannur Road, towards the north, provides accessibility through the Nayikali Bridge and the Mannur Bridge to SH 36, thus allowing easy access to towns like Irikkur, Sreekandapuram, Taliparamba, and Payyanur. The Anjarakandy Road passes at the entrance of the airport and connects settlements like Anjarakandy and Chakkarakkal. The Thalassery–Coorg Road also connects the proposed Hill Highway at Iritty, which in turn provides connectivity to all major settlements in the western Ghat area.

Kerala government has given node for developing various roads connecting Kannur Airport like Vayanthode-Mattanur-Koottupuzha road, Thalassery-Anjarakandy-Mattanur road, Kuttiady-Panoor-Mattanur road, Mananthavady-Mattanur road, Kannur-Airport roads for better connectivity.

There is no rail connectivity to Mattanur, but proposals for Thalassery–Mysore railway line and Kannur South Airport Railway line are still active. The nearest railway station is Thalassery, and is located at a distance of 26 km (16 mi) from Mattanur. The Kannur railway station, located at 27 km (17 mi) from Mattanur, is the major station in the district, with access to all trains, including super-fast trains, to the north and south of the country.

== Administration ==
Mattanur Municipality composes of 36 wards for which the members of municipal council are elected for every five years. The current municipal chairman is N. Shajith from Nellunni ward and vice chairperson is O. Preetha from Devarkad ward.

=== Mattanur municipality election 2022 ===
| S.no. | Party name | Party symbol | Number of councillors |
|---|---|---|---|
| 01 | LDF | | 21 |
| 02 | UDF | | 13 |
| 03 | BJP | | 01 |

In Swachh Survekshan 2024-25, Mattannur Municipality was ranked 53rd among the cleanest urban areas in India and second in Kerala, after Kochi Municipal Corporation, which was ranked 50th.

In 2025–26, Mattanur was awarded as Kerala's State First Swachh City for being a top–performing urban local body in the state.

== Law and order ==
The municipality comes under jurisdiction of Mattanur police station established in the year 1871 during the tenure of British rule. Mattannur station comes under the jurisdiction of Kannur City Police. There are six villages in the police station limits viz Koodali, Pattannur, Kolari, Keezhallur, Pazhassi and Chavassery.

Mattanur has two major courts

- First Class Magistrate Court, Mattannur
- Fast Track Special Court, Mattanur

== Politics ==
Mattanur Assembly constituency is a part of Kannur Lok Sabha constituency. Mattanur Assembly is historically a strong hold of Communist Party. The current MLA of Mattanur is K. K. Shailaja from CPI-M who won in 2021 Kerala Legislative Assembly election with highest margin in Kerala of 96,129 votes and 61.96% vote share.

== Educational institutions ==
- Pazhassi Raja NSS College, Mattannur
- St Thomas College of Engineering and Technology
- Govt. Polytechnic College, Mattanur
- Rajeev Memorial College of Teacher Education, Mattanur
- Govt HSS, Mattanur
- Sree Sankara Vidyapeetam Senior Secondary School, Mattannur
- Govt HSS, Chavassery

== Notable sites ==
- Pazhassi Raja Smrithi Mandiram, located at Pazhassi, Mattannur is a museum dedicated to Pazhassi Raja at his ancestral place. Constructed in the model of Koothambalam, it is built above a pond, which was once part of the palace complex of Pazhassi Raja.
- Pazhassi Palace, also known as Pazhassi Kovilakam or Kottayam Padinjare Kovilakam, was constructed in 1903 by the Pazhassi royal family in Kerala architecture.
- Palukachippara is a nearby hill station situated 8 km (5.0 mi) away from Mattanur town. The hills are nearly 2,347 ft above sea level, are part of the Western Ghats. The area, part of the Palukachippara ecotourism project, is controlled by the state forest department.

== Geography ==
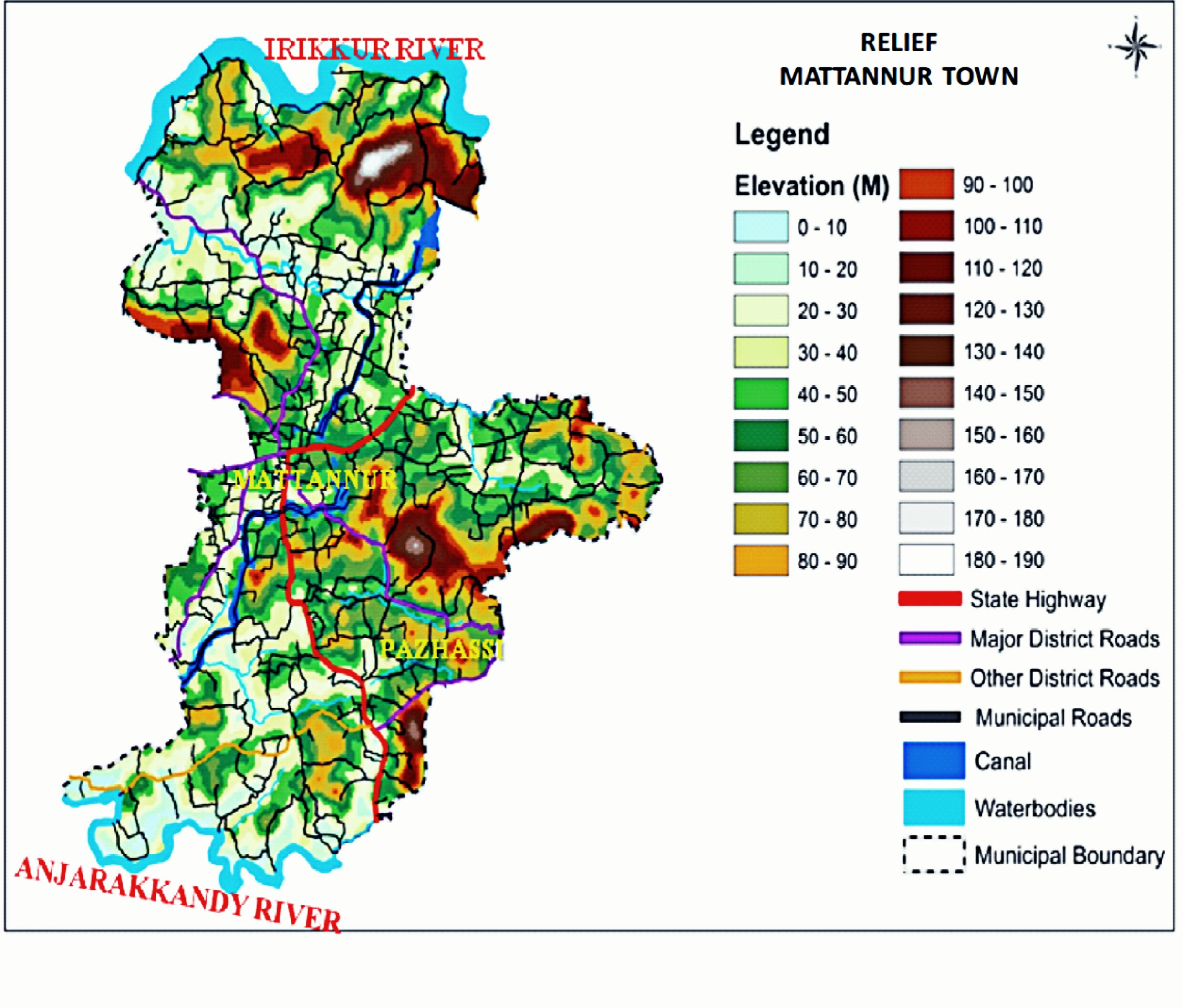
Mattanur geography

The area has the typical midland characteristics of Kerala, with undulating terrain that is mainly used for agriculture. The geographical area of the municipal town stretches between the Irikkur River (a portion of the Valapattanam River) in the north and the Anjarakandy River in the south. The town is located at the foothills of the western shoulders of the Western Ghats, rising at the east side, while the western boundary contains gradual sloping terrain leading to the Lakshadweep Sea. The Thalassery–Coorg Road (SH30) passes through the Mattanur municipal town.

== Climate ==
Mattanur

Climate chart (precipitation, max. and min. temperature)
| J | F | M | A | M | J | J | A | S | O | N | D |
| 2 29 21 | 18 31 22 | 39 32 22 | 109 31 22 | 189 29 22 | 638 25 19 | 780 23 21 | 485 24 18 | 236 26 20 | 242 27 20 | 121 27 21 | 17 28 20 |
- █ Average max. and min. temperatures in °C
- █ Precipitation totals in mm
Imperial conversion
| J | F | M | A | M | J | J | A | S | O | N | D |
| 0.1 84 70 | 0.7 88 72 | 1.5 90 72 | 4.3 88 72 | 7.4 84 72 | 25 77 66 | 31 73 70 | 19 75 64 | 9.3 79 68 | 9.5 81 68 | 4.8 81 70 | 0.7 82 68 |
- █ Average max. and min. temperatures in °F
- █ Precipitation totals in inches

The region has a tropical humid climate with hot summer and plentiful rainfall. It rains throughout the year except during the months from January to April. The average rainfall is 3438 mm. The rainfall during July is very heavy and the region receives 68% of the annual rainfall during this season. The region has a humid climate with an oppressive hot season from March to the end of May. This is followed by south-west monsoon, which continues till the end of September. October and November witnesses the post-monsoon (North-East monsoon) or retreating monsoon season. During the months of April and May, the mean daily maximum temperature is about 35 °C. The temperature is low in December and January, and the minimum temperature is about 20 °C. On certain days, the night temperature may go down to 16 °C, although this is extremely rare.

== Kerala Industrial Infrastructure Development Corporation Industrial Park ==
Kerala Industrial Infrastructure Development Corporation Industrial Park is located in Velliyampara near Mattanur. Government of Kerala has proposed for future developments in KINFRA Industrial Park here. Mattanur is to be made a hub of KINFRA's operations in north Kerala.

A rubber glove factory is proposed at Kinfra park here. Kerala State Industrial Development Corporation (KSIDC) is in charge of the project.

== Demographics ==
As of the 2011 census, Mattanur Municipality had a population of 47,078, of which males constituted 22,658 (48.1%) of the population, and females constituted 24,420 (51.9%). Mattanur municipality spreads over an area of 54.32 km^{2} with 9,788 families residing in it. The sex ratio of Mattanur was 1,078 lower than the state average of 1,084. In Mattanur, 11.5% of the population was under 6 years of age. Mattanur municipality had an overall literacy of 94.8% higher than state average of 94%. Male literacy was 97.6% and female literacy was 92.2%.

The decadal growth rate for the 2001–2011 period was 6.23%, which ranked the second position in the district behind Taliparamba. Mattanur possessed the least sex ratio (1,078 females per 1,000 males) and the highest value of workforce participation ratio (36.75%) among the municipal towns in the Kannur district.

=== Religions ===
As of the 2011 census, Mattanur Municipality had a total population of 47,078, of whom 29,739 (63.2%) were Hindus, 16,913 (35.9%) were Muslims, 283 (0.6%) were Christians and 0.3% were other.

== Notable people ==
- Salim Ahamed - Indian film director, screenwriter and producer
- Anju Aravind - Indian film actress
- Pazhassi Raja - King of Kottayam dynasty
- Mattannur Sankarankutty - Indian percussionist
- K. K. Shailaja - Indian politician, former Health Minister of Kerala
- C. Sadanandan Master - Member of Parliament, Rajyasabha

== See also ==
- Ayyallur
- Kalaroad
- Kololam
