= Kalaroad =

Village in Kannur district, Kerala, India

Kalaroad is a town of Mattannur in Kannur district of Kerala state, India. Kalaroad is a small town. PP Jaleel Sahib is the local body member of Kalaroad. Kalaroad includes Muslims & Hindus.

== Education ==
Mattannur HSS is situated in Kalaroad. Masjidu Rahma is the masjid and Ishathul Uloom is the madrasa situated in Kalaroad controlled by IUPMC.

== Transportation ==
The national highway passes through Kannur town. Goa and Mumbai can be accessed on the northern side and Cochin and Thiruvananthapuram can be accessed on the southern side. The road to the east of Iritty connects to Mysore and Bangalore. The nearest railway station is Kannur on Mangalore-Palakkad line. Trains are available to almost all parts of India subject to advance booking over the internet. There are airports at Mattanur, Mangalore and Calicut. All of them are international airports but direct flights are available only to Middle Eastern countries.
