= Chakkarakkal =

- Town
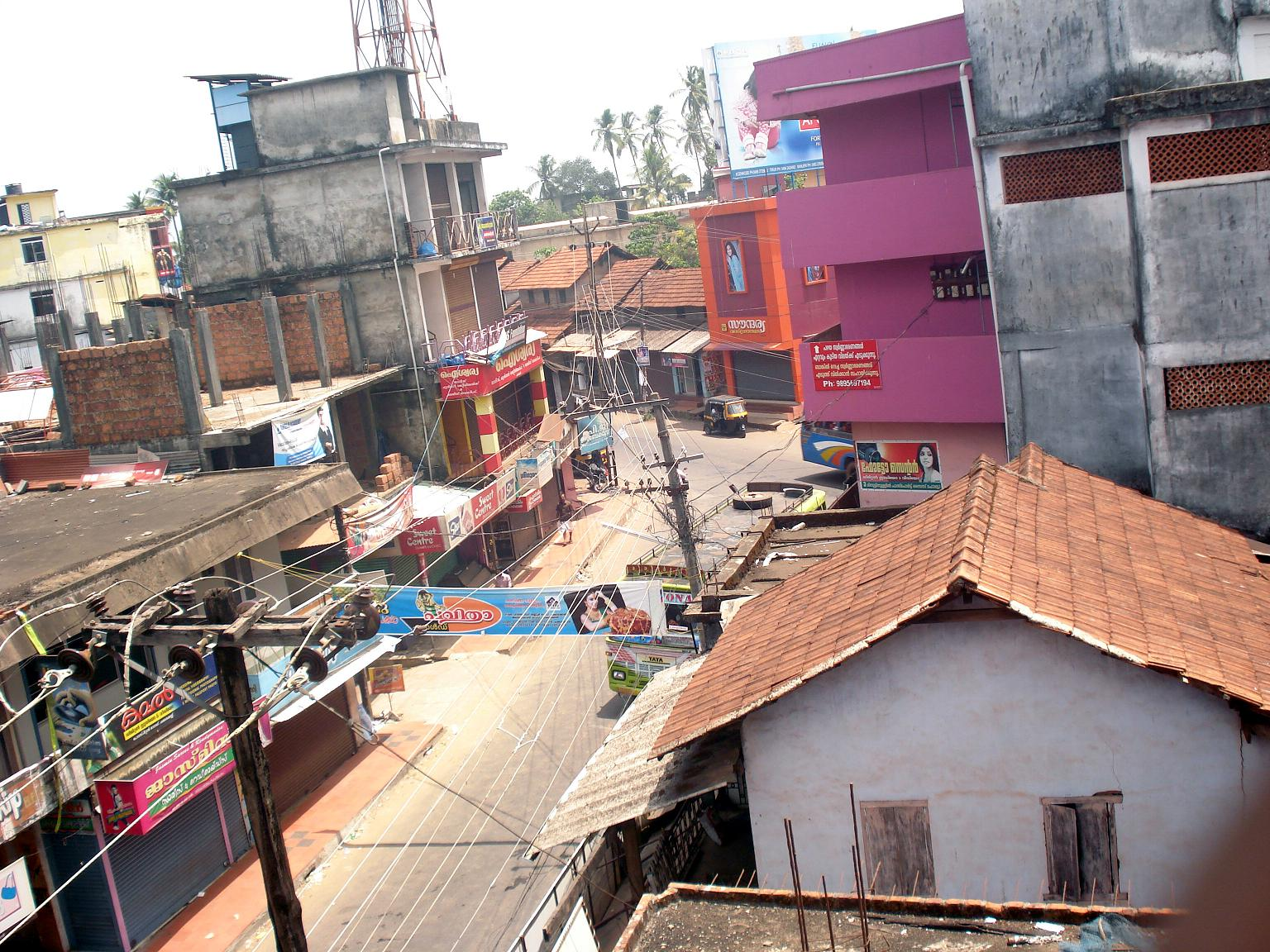
- Chakkarakkal town

- Location in Kerala, India Chakkarakkal (India)
- Coordinates: 11.8907°N 75.4706°E
- Country: India
- State: Kerala
- District: Kannur

Government
  - Body: Chembilode & Anjarakandi Grama Panchayats

Languages
  - Official: Malayalam, English
- Time zone: UTC+5:30 (IST)
- PIN: 670613
- Telephone code: 0497
- ISO 3166 code: IN-KL
- Vehicle registration: KL-13
- Niyamasabha constituency: Dharmadom
- Lok Sabha constituency: Kannur

Chakkarakkal is a junction and township in Kannur district, Kerala, India. It is located 13 km (8.1 mi) east of Kannur, 15.5 km (9.6 mi) southwest of Mattanur, 15 km (9.3 mi) northwest of Kuthuparamba and 21 km (13 mi) north of Thalassery.

== Administration ==
Chakkarakal town spans across Chembilode and Anjarakandi panchayats. It is a major town in Dharmadom Assembly constituency, which is a part of Kannur Lok Sabha constituency. Chakkarakal is ward number 4 of Chembilode panchayat and ward number 16 of Anjarakandi panchayat.

== Transportation ==
The national highway passes through Kannur town. Goa and Mumbai can be accessed on the northern side and Cochin and Thiruvananthapuram can be accessed on the southern side. The road to the east of Iritty connects to Mysore and Bangalore. The nearest railway station is Kannur on Mangalore-Palakkad line.

Trains are available to almost all parts of India subject to advance booking over the internet. There are airports at Mattanur, Mangalore and Calicut. All of them are international airports but direct flights are available only to Middle Eastern countries.
