= K. K. Shailaja =

Indian politician

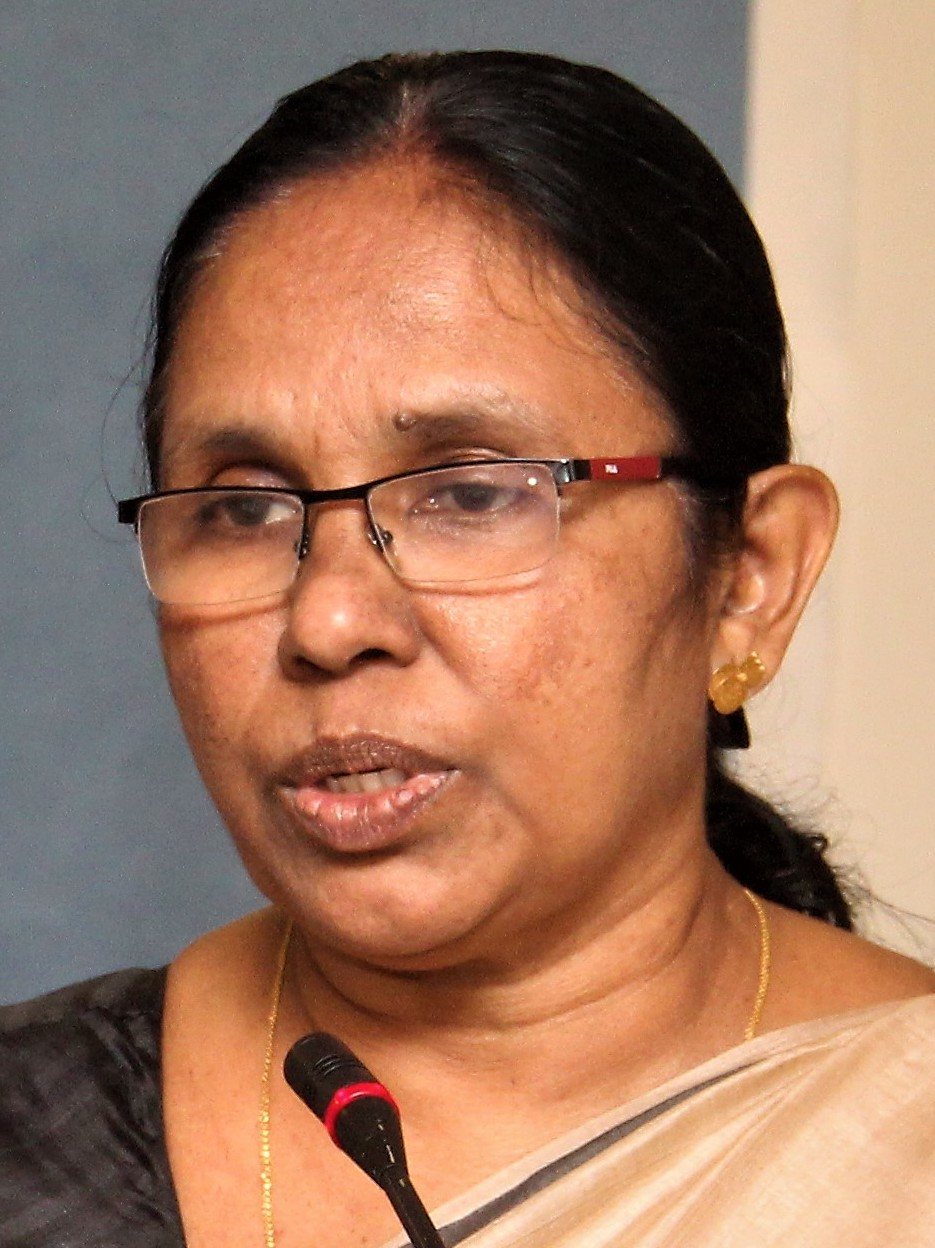

Chief Whip of CPI(M) in Kerala Legislative Assembly
- In office 20 May 2021 – 17 May 2026

Minister for Health, Government of Kerala
- In office 25 May 2016 – 19 May 2021
- Preceded by: V. S. Sivakumar (Health); M. K. Muneer (Social Welfare)
- Succeeded by: Veena George (Health); R. Bindu (Social Justice)

Member of Kerala Legislative Assembly
- In office 24 May 2021 – 21 May 2026
- Preceded by: E. P. Jayarajan
- Succeeded by: V. K. Sanoj
- Constituency: Mattanur
- In office 19 May 2016 – 02 May 2021
- Preceded by: K. P. Mohanan
- Succeeded by: K. P. Mohanan
- Constituency: Kuthuparamba
- In office 2006–2011
- Preceded by: A. D. Mustafa
- Succeeded by: Sunny Joseph
- Constituency: Peravoor
- In office 1996–2001
- Preceded by: Pinarayi Vijayan
- Succeeded by: P. Jayarajan
- Constituency: Kuthuparamba

Personal details
- Born: 20 November 1956 (age 69) Mattanur, Kerala, India
- Party: Communist Party of India (Marxist)
- Parents: K. Kunthan; K. K. Shantha
- Education: Pazhassi Raja N. S. S. College, Mattanur (B.Sc.Chemistry); Visvesvarayya College (B.Ed.)
- Awards: CEU Open Society Prize (2021)

K. Kundan Shailaja (born 20 November 1956) is an Indian politician who served as the Minister for Health and Family Welfare and Social Justice of Kerala from 25 May 2016 to 19 May 2021. From 2016 to 2026, she represented the Mattanur Assembly constituency in the Kerala Legislative Assembly.

Shailaja is a Central Committee member of the Communist Party of India (Marxist). Before entering active politics, she worked as a high school physics teacher. In June 2020, she was honoured by the United Nations for her efforts in tackling the COVID-19 pandemic.

She was previously elected as the MLA from the Kuthuparamba constituency in 1996 and 2016, and Peravoor constituency in 2006. She served as the Minister of Health, Social Justice, and Woman and Child Development in the first Vijayan ministry (2016–21). In the 2021 Kerala Legislative Assembly election, Shailaja recorded the largest victory margin ever (60,963 votes) in the history of Kerala Legislative Assembly elections which was later surpassed by IUML's P. K. Kunhalikutty's victory margin (85,327) in the 2026 Kerala Legislative Assembly election.

== Early life and education ==
KK Shailaja, born on 20 November 1956, in Mattannoor, Kannur, is the daughter of Shri K. Kundan and Smt. K. K. Shantha.

=== Education ===
She obtained a bachelor's degree in Chemistry from Pazhassi Raja N. S. S. College. She furthered her education by earning a Bachelor of Education degree from Visvesvarayya College.

== Personal life ==
Growing up in a politically active environment, she was deeply influenced by her maternal grandmother, MK Kalyani, a prominent figure known for her staunch communist beliefs and community service in Iritty. Kalyani's dedication to public welfare, including aiding Communist leaders during the British era and assisting during disease outbreaks, left a lasting impression on Shailaja.

Raised primarily by her mother, grandmother, and aunt, Shailaja was immersed in stories of her family's involvement in leftist struggles. She heard tales of her granduncle MK Ramunny's imprisonment and subsequent demise due to custodial torture, as well as her other granduncle MK Krishnan's survival of a police shooting during a farmers' protest in 1950.

KK Shailaja married in 1981. Bhaskaran Master, K. K. Shailaja's husband, has been important in leftist groups in Kerala. He was once the district committee president of the Democratic Youth Federation of India (DYFI), which is part of the Communist Party of India (Marxist) (CPI(M)). During that time, Shailaja was also involved with the committee. In her early years with the DYFI, she collaborated closely with Bhaskaran Master. He supported Shailaja's political work, and his beliefs in leftist ideas have been crucial in their relationship. Before retiring, Bhaskaran Master worked as a teacher, including being the headmaster of a school in Mattannur, Kerala before retiring.

== Teaching career ==
Before entering active politics, K. K. Shailaja worked as a full-time high school (physics and chemistry) teacher, for 23 years. In 2004, she chose to take voluntary retirement and transitioned into a full-time politician.

== Political career ==
She began her political journey by joining the Students Federation of India during her school years and later became involved with the Kerala Socialist Youth Federation, which eventually transformed into the DYFI in 1980. In her early years with the DYFI, she collaborated closely with Bhaskaran Master, whom she later married in 1981.

Over the span of nearly two decades, Shailaja steadily rose through the ranks of the DYFI and the CPIM. She also took on the role of editor for Sthree Shabdam, the official mouthpiece of the Kerala State Unit of the All India Democratic Women's Association (AIDWA), a left-oriented women's organization. In 1996, Shailaja contested for the first time in the Koothuparamba constituency.

Following her election as a ML in 1996, Shailaja Teacher took leave from her teaching profession. However, in 2004, she opted for voluntary retirement to fully commit herself to serving the people through politics. "The party wanted me to serve full-time, and therefore I had to leave teaching," she explains.

In 2006, Shailaja contested and won from the Peravoor constituency. However, in 2011, she lost the seat to Congress leader Sunny Joseph. It was her victory in the 2016 elections from Koothuparamba that paved the way for her appointment as the health minister in the Pinarayi Vijayan cabinet.

K. K. Shailaja has been elected as CPIM Central Committee Member in the 20th Congress of the CPIM held between 4 and 9 April 2012 at Kozhikode, Kerala and the State Secretary of All India Democratic Women's Association.

She represented Kuthuparamba in 1996 and Peravoor in 2006, both of which are in Kannur district, in the KLA. Shailaja won a total of 67,013 votes in the Kuthuparamba constituency, winning by a margin of 12,291 votes. In the first Pinarayi Vijayan ministry, she was the minister of Health and Social Welfare.

As Health Minister, Shailaja Teacher has come to be highly regarded for her unwavering commitment and strong work ethic. As quoted from one of her colleagues in the Health Department: "She is a tough taskmaster. It doesn't matter if it's midnight or if she is having any ailments, the minister is there to monitor every arrangement. In the case of nCoV prevention and control, the minister is leading from the front by convening assessment meetings daily".

Her leadership during the Nipah and COVID-19 outbreaks was widely lauded. She had set up a team which enabled the fast diagnosis and further management of the deadly viruses. The film Virus is based on the Nipah virus outbreak in the state. In this film Revathi portrayed the character based on her.

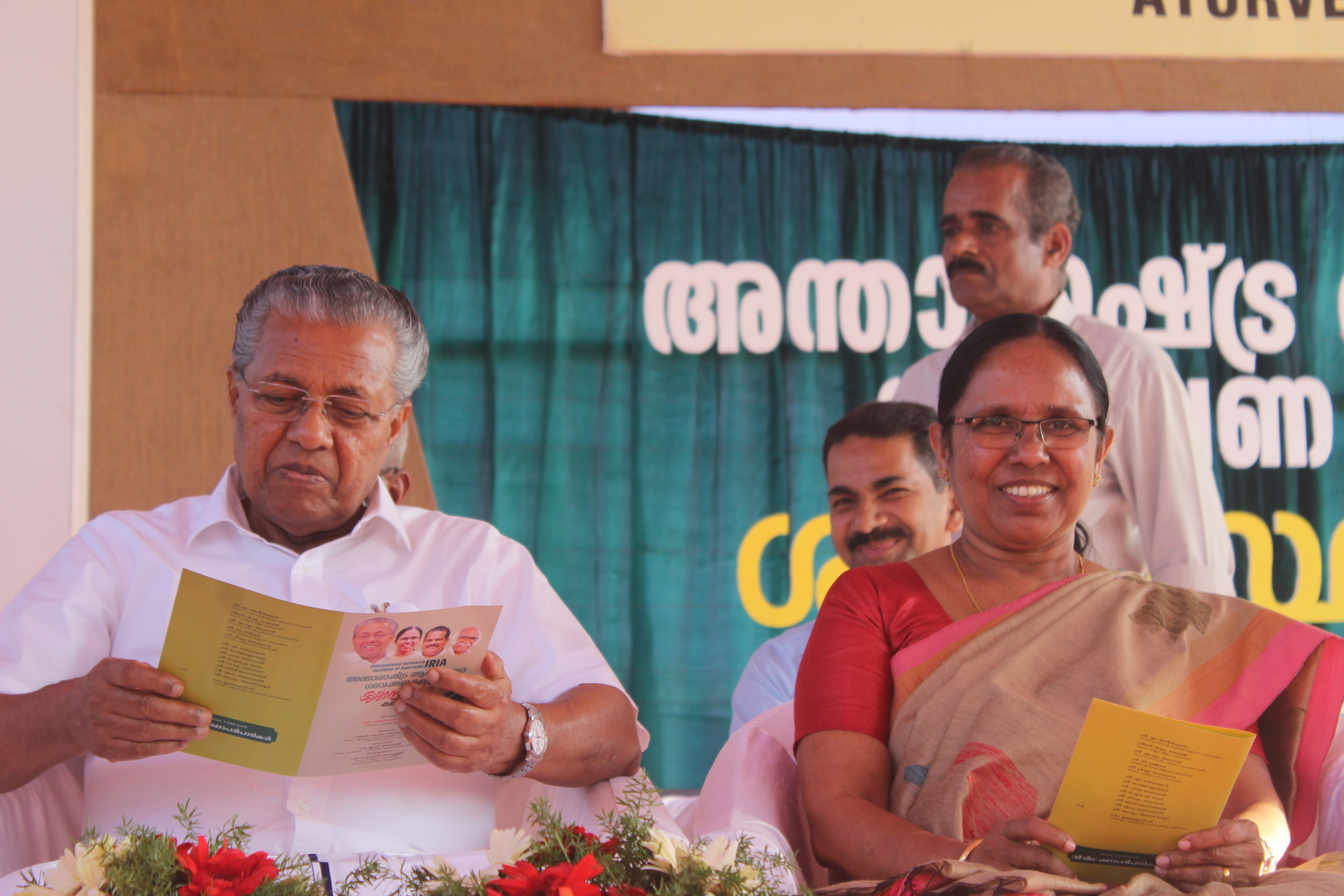
K. K Shailaja with Kerala Chief Minister Pinarayi Vijayan

K. K. Shailaja has received international attention for her leadership in tackling COVID-19 pandemic in Kerala. Till around mid-March, she gave daily press briefings. She was invited by the United Nations to participate in a panel discussion on United Nations Public Service Day 2020, for her efforts to fight COVID-19 in her state on 23 June 2020. The Guardian described her as "coronavirus slayer" and "rock star health minister". BBC News featured her among a list of Asian women corona fighters. She was also featured by Vogue Magazine as a "Vogue Warrior". The British magazine Prospect selected her as the world's 'top thinker' of 2020, pushing the prime minister of New Zealand Jacinda Ardern to the 2nd position. Financial Times named Shailaja as one of the world's most influential women of 2020.

Her exclusion in the second Vijayan ministry, which includes all debutants except chief minister, was a subject of controversy in media outlets and in social media.

== Books ==
KK Shailaja has authored three books:

- Indian Varthamanavum Sthreesamoohavum
- China: Rashtram, Rashtreeyam, Kazhchakal

=== Biography ===
- My Life as a Comrade: The Story of an Extraordinary Politician and the World That Shaped Her

== Electoral performance ==
Election candidature history
| Election | Year | Party | Constituency | Opponent | | Result | Margin |
|---|---|---|---|---|---|---|---|
| Loksabha | 2024 | CPI(M) | Vatakara | INC | Shafi Parambil | Lost | 114,506 |
| Kerala Legislative Assembly | 1996 | CPI(M) | Kuthuparamba | INC | M. P. Krishnan Nair | Won | 18,993 |
| Kerala Legislative Assembly | 2006 | CPI(M) | Peravoor | INC | A. D. Mustafa | Won | 9,099 |
| Kerala Legislative Assembly | 2011 | CPI(M) | Peravoor | INC | Sunny Joseph | Lost | 3,440 |
| Kerala Legislative Assembly | 2016 | CPI(M) | Kuthuparamba | JD(U) | K. P. Mohanan | Won | 12,291 |
| Kerala Legislative Assembly | 2021 | CPI(M) | Mattanur | RSP | Illikkal Augusthy | Won | 60,963 |
| Kerala Legislative Assembly | 2026 | CPI(M) | Peravoor | INC | Sunny Joseph | Lost | 14,453 |

== Awards and honours ==
In June 2020, Shailaja was honoured by the United Nations for her efforts to tackle the COVID-19 pandemic. She was among a few of the world leaders invited to speak on the occasion of the United Nations Public Service Day. K. K. Shailaja was awarded the Central European University (CEU) Open Society Prize for 2021, the honour was in recognition of her social commitment to public health services.
