= Koodali =

- Census Town
- Location in Kerala, India Koodali (India)
- Coordinates: 11.9223°N 75.4798°E
- Country: India
- State: Kerala
- District: Kannur
- Taluk: Thalassery

Government
  - Type: Panchayati raj (India)
  - Body: Koodali Grama Panchayat

Area
  - Total: 16.85 km^{2} (6.51 sq mi)

Population (2011)
  - Total: 15,236
  - Density: 904.2/km^{2} (2,342/sq mi)

Languages
  - Official: Malayalam, English
- Time zone: UTC+5:30 (IST)
- PIN: 670592
- ISO 3166 code: IN-KL
- Vehicle registration: KL- 13/58
- Lok Sabha constituency: Kannur

Koodali is a census town and grama panchayat in Thalassery taluk of Kannur district in Kerala state, India. Koodali is located 15.5 km (9.6 mi) east of Kannur city on Kannur-Mattanur road.

== Educational institutions ==
- Koodali Higher Secondary School (established 1946), won the state award for the best school in Kerala in 1982
- Koodali UP School
- Munderi Govt. Higher Secondary school
- Kanhirode Aided LP School (Vayal School)
- Fazl-E-Omar Public School
- Gems Millennium Private School
- Vivekananda Vidyalayam (RSS syllabus)
- Progressive College
- Nalanda College
- Kavumthazha LP school
- Thattiyod LP School

== Demographics ==
As of 2011 Census, Koodali had a population of 15,236 which constitute 7,074 males and 8,162 females. Koodali census town have an area of 16.85 km^{2} (6.51 sq mi) with 3,447 families residing in it. The average sex ratio was 1154 higher than the state average of 1084. In Koodali, 10.2% of the population was under 6 years of age. Koodali had an average literacy of 95.8% higher than the state average of 94%; male literacy was 97.6% and female literacy was 94.3%.

Koodali Grama Panchayat had total population of 30,239 among which 15,003 people lives in rural areas and 15,236 in urban areas. Males constitute 47.1% of the population and Females were 52.9%. In Koodali Panchayat, 11.4% of the population was under 6 years of age. Koodali Panchayat had an average literacy of 95%. Koodali Panchayat have administration over Koodali census town and Pattannur village.

== Religion ==
As of 2011 India census, Koodali census town had total population of 15,236 among which 12,208 (80.13%) are Hindus, 2,980 (19.56%) are Muslims, 0.2% Christians and 0.11% others.

The main festival in Koodali is Thazathe Veettil (part of Koodali Thazhathe Tharavaad) Uthsavam (Teyyam, as it is called). There are many temples in Koodali, such as Sree Puthiya Madham, Muchilottu Bhagavathi Kshethram, Cherukottaram, Koodali Kavu, Thattiyodu Sree Mahavishnu Kshethram, Chonnamma Kottam, Koodali Ganapathy Kshethram, and Poovathur Ambalam. Muslims attend the Koodali Juma Masjid. Hinduism and Islam are the most practiced religions in Koodali, with Christianity also practiced by some residents.

Koodali was also the home of a Koodali Amma, a religious leader whose ashram is still intact.

== Administration ==
Koodali census town is part of Koodali Grama Panchayat in Iritty Block Panchayat. Koodali is politically part of Mattanur Assembly constituency under Kannur Loksabha constituency.

== Feudal connections ==
Koodali Thazath Veedu is an old feudal family and the source of feudal stories in the region.

A historical overview of the family from the pre-British days is available in "Koodali Grantavari," edited by K.K.N. Kurup and published by the Department of History, University of Calicut.

Among the members of the family are KT Kunhikammaran Nambiar, a member of the Madras Legislative Council and KT Kunhiraman Nambiar, volunteer of Indian National Congress and participant in Salt Satyagraha in Malabar, and later president of Kerala's Pradesh Congress Committee, and member of the undivided Communist Party of India.

== Sports & Arts ==
Koodali's residents participate in cricket, football, swimming and other sports. Local sports clubs include:

- Tigers Club, Thattiyode
- Tigers Arts & Sports Club
- Peoples' Arts & Sports Club
- Galaxy Sports Club
- Mathrubhumi Study Circle
- KFC Koodali
- FC Thalamunda
- Coaching Centre Koodali
- Flowers Arts and sports club koodali

== Politics ==
- District: Kannur
- Assembly: Mattanur
- Panchayath (see Panchayati Raj): Koodali
- Village: Koodali

== Access ==
Koodali is near Kannur International Airport (pilot project), located some 12 kilometres (7 mi) away on Mattannur road. Koodali is sixteen kilometers from the Kannur bus stand and Railway station. Koodali can be reached from Kannur bus stand either by Irikkur or by Iritty bus. Anjarakkandy Medical Institute can be accessed from Koodali by travelling a distance of nearly 8 km through Chakkarakkal. The national highway passes through Kannur town. Goa and Mumbai can be accessed on the northern side and Cochin and Thiruvananthapuram can be accessed on the southern side. Taliparamba has a good bus station and buses are easily available to all parts of Kannur district. The road to the east of Iritty connects to Mysore and Bangalore. But buses to these cities are available only from Kannur, 22 km to the south. The nearest railway stations are Kannapuram and Kannur on Mangalore-Palakkad line. Trains are available to almost all parts of India subject to advance booking over the internet. There are airports at Kannur, Mangalore and Calicut. All of them are small international airports with direct flights available only to Middle Eastern countries.
