= Ayyallur =

- village
- Country: India
- State: Kerala
- District: Kannur
- Municipality: Mattanur

Languages
  - Official: Malayalam, English
- Time zone: UTC+5:30 (IST)
- ISO 3166 code: IN-KL

Ayyallur is a village located in Mattanur Municipality in the Indian state of Kerala. It is located around 4 km east of Mattanur town

Ayyallur lies between Mattanur and Malur and is bordered by Pazhassi, Edavelikkal, Kolari and Sivapuram.

== Education ==
Ayyallur L P School is the only one school present in this village which offers primary education.

== Transportation ==
The national highway passes through Kannur town. Goa and Mumbai can be accessed on the northern side and Cochin and Thiruvananthapuram can be accessed on the southern side. The road to the east of Iritty connects to Mysore and Bangalore. The nearest railway station is Kannur on Mangalore-Palakkad line. Trains are available to almost all parts of India subject to advance booking over the internet. There are airports at Mattanur, Mangalore and Calicut. All of them are international airports but direct flights are available only to Middle Eastern countries.
