= E. P. Jayarajan =

Indian politician

E. P. Jayarajan Nambiar
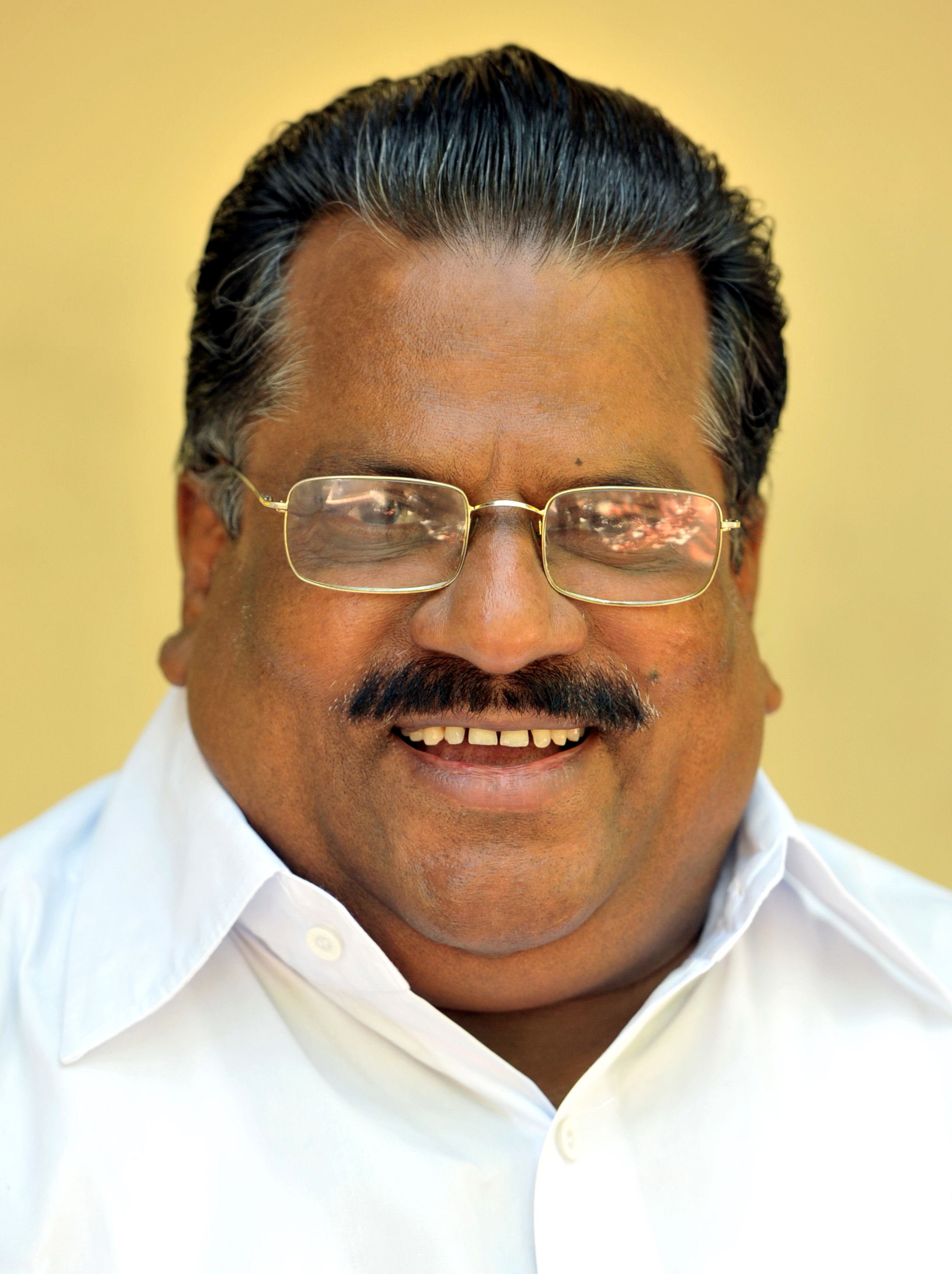

Minister for Industries and Sports, Government of Kerala
- In office 14 August 2018 – 3 May 2021
- Preceded by: A. C. Moideen
- Succeeded by: P. Rajeev (Minister for Industries); V. Abdurahiman (Minister for Sports)
- In office 25 May 2016 – 14 October 2016
- Preceded by: P. K. Kunhalikutty (Minister for Industries); Thiruvanchoor Radhakrishnan (Minister for Sports)
- Succeeded by: A. C. Moideen

Member of the Kerala Legislative Assembly
- In office 2011–2021
- Preceded by: Constituency created
- Succeeded by: K. K. Shailaja
- Constituency: Mattanur
- In office 1991–1996
- Preceded by: M. V. Raghavan
- Succeeded by: T. K. Balan
- Constituency: Azhikode

Convenor, Left Democratic Front
- In office 19 April 2022 – 31 August 2024
- Preceded by: A. Vijayaraghavan
- Succeeded by: T. P. Ramakrishnan

President, Democratic Youth Federation of India
- In office 1980 – 1984
- Preceded by: Office created
- Succeeded by: M. Vijayakumar

Personal details
- Born: 28 May 1950 (age 76) Irinave, Kannur, Madras State (present day Kannur, Kerala), India
- Party: Communist Party of India (Marxist)
- Spouse: P. K. Indira
- Children: 2
- Parents: B. M. Krishnan Nambiar; E. P. Parvathi Amma

E. P. Jayarajan Nambiar (born 28 May 1950) is an Indian politician from the state of Kerala. He was the Minister for Industries and Sports in the First Vijayan ministry. He was elected to the Kerala Legislative Assembly from Mattanur constituency in Kannur district and is a member of the Communist Party of India (Marxist).

== Personal life ==
Jayarajan was born on 28 May 1950 at Irinave village in Madras State (present-day Kannur district), India, as the son of B. M. Krishnan Nambiar and E. P. Parvathi Amma. After pre-degree education, he completed diploma in electrical engineering. He is married to P. K. Indira and has two sons. He resides in Pappinisseri, Kannur.

== Political career ==
He was the first All India President of D.Y.F.I. (Democratic Youth Federation of India) and was the General Manager of the CPI(M) party mouthpiece Deshabhimani. He was the President of Kerala Karshaka Sangham and Central Committee Member of Communist Party of India (Marxist).

He was a Member of Kerala Legislative Assembly from 1991 to 1996 and 2011 to 2021. On 25 May 2016, he took oath as the Minister for Industries and Sports under the new Kerala Cabinet led by Pinarayi Vijayan. On 14 October 2016, he resigned over nepotism following allegations that he appointed his own family members as heads of public sector undertakings in the state. In September 2017, the Vigilance and Anti-Corruption Bureau (VACB) acquitted Jayarajan in the nepotism case and sought to close the case. He served as the convener of the Left Democratic Front in Kerala from 2022 to 2024.

Kerala Legislative Assembly Election
| Year | Constituency | Closest Rival | Majority (Votes) | Won/Lost |
|---|---|---|---|---|
| 1987 | Azhikode | MV Raghavan (UDF Independent) | 1389 | Lost |
| 1991 | Azhikode | C.P. Moosankutty (CMP) | 7709 | Won |
| 2011 | Mattannur | Joseph Chaavara (SJD) | 30512 | Won |
| 2016 | Mattannur | K. P. Prasanth (JD(U)) | 43381 | Won |
