= Mattanur Assembly constituency =

Constituency of the Kerala legislative assembly in India

Mattanur
- Constituency No. 15 for the Kerala Legislative Assembly
- Kannur International Airport

Constituency details
- Country: India
- Region: South India
- State: Kerala
- District: Kannur
- Lok Sabha constituency: Kannur
- Established: 1951
- Total electors: 201,719 (2026)
- Reservation: None

Member of Legislative Assembly
- 16th Kerala Legislative Assembly
- Incumbent V. K. Sanoj
- Party: CPI(M)
- Alliance: LDF
- Elected year: 2026

Mattanur Assembly constituency is one of the 140 state legislative assembly constituencies in Kerala, India. It is one of the seven assembly segments that constitute the Kannur Lok Sabha constituency. As of 2026 Kerala Assembly elections, the current MLA is V.K. Sanoj of the Communist Party of India (Marxist).

Mattanur was reestablished by the 2008 delimitation, by incorporating major parts Of previous Kuthuparamba seat. It recorded the largest ever victory margin (60,963) in the history of Kerala Legislative Assembly elections in the 2021 Kerala Legislative Assembly election, achieved by K. K. Shailaja which was later surpassed by IUML's P. K. Kunhalikutty's victory margin (85,327) in the 2026 Kerala Legislative Assembly election.

== Local self-governed segments ==
Mattannur Assembly constituency is composed of the following local self-governed segments:

Sl no.	Name	Status (grama panchayat/municipality)	Taluk
1	Mattanur	Municipality	Iritty
2	Chittariparamba	Grama panchayat	Thalassery
3	Keezhallur	Grama panchayat	Thalassery
4	Kolayad	Grama panchayat	Thalassery
5	Koodali	Grama panchayat	Thalassery
6	Maloor	Grama panchayat	Thalassery
7	Mangattidam	Grama panchayat	Thalassery
8	Padiyoor-Kalliad	Grama panchayat	Iritty
9	Thillenkeri	Grama panchayat	Iritty

മട്ടന്നൂർ നിയമസഭാമണ്ഡലം

== Members of Legislative Assembly ==
Election	Niyama Sabha	Name	Party	Tenure
1957	1st	N. E. Balaram	Communist Party of India	1957 – 1960
1960	2nd	N. E. Balaram	Communist Party of India	1960 – 1965
2011	13th	E. P. Jayarajan	Communist Party of India (Marxist)	2011 – 2016
2016	14th	E. P. Jayarajan	Communist Party of India (Marxist)	2016 – 2021
2021	15th	K. K. Shailaja	Communist Party of India (Marxist)	2021 – 2026
2026	16th	V. K. Sanoj	Communist Party of India (Marxist)	Incumbent

== Election results ==
Percentage change (±%) denotes the change in the number of votes from the immediate previous election.

=== 2026 ===
There were 201,719 registered voters in the Mattanur Assembly constituency for the 2026 Kerala Assembly elections.

2026 Kerala Legislative Assembly election: Mattanur
Party	Candidate	Votes	%	±%
CPI(M)	V. K. Sanoj	81,456	47.96	▼14.01
INC	Chandran Thillenkeri	67,288	39.60	▲16.93
BJP	Biju Elakkuzhi	17,815	10.49	▼1.26
SDPI	Basheer Punnad	2,171	1.28	▼1.43
NOTA	None of the above	771	0.45	▼0.06
Independent	Sanoj	210	0.12	
Independent	Chandran Thengalath	147	0.09	
Margin of victory		14,168	8.36	▼30.88
Turnout		1,69,858		
CPI(M) hold		Swing	▼14.01	

Local Body	Booths	UDF Votes	LDF Votes	NDA/BJP Votes	Leader	Lead
Koodali	30	11,131	11,381	2,168	LDF	250
Padiyoor-Kalliad	17	5,154	5,733	1,134	LDF	579
Mattannur Municipality	29	12,367	10,428	2,587	UDF	1,939
Keezhallur	26	8,223	10,333	2,387	LDF	2,110
Maloor	20	6,075	8,353	1,864	LDF	2,278
Thillenkeri	11	3,877	4,749	1,035	LDF	872
Mangattidam	29	8,206	13,405	2,737	LDF	5,199
Chittariparamba	23	5,406	9,275	2,229	LDF	3,869
Kolayad	20	5,428	5,657	1,322	LDF	229
TOTAL	205	65,867	79,314	17,463	LDF	13,447

=== 2021 ===
There were 1,90,139 registered voters in the Mattanur constituency for the 2021 Kerala Assembly election.

2021 Kerala Legislative Assembly election: Mattanur
Party	Candidate	Votes	%	±%
CPI(M)	K. K. Shailaja	96,129	61.97	▲5.35
RSP	Illikkal Augusthy	35,166	22.67	–
BJP	Biju Elakkuzhi	18,223	11.75	▼0.77
SDPI	Rafeekh Keecheri	4,201	2.71	▲0.57
NOTA	None of the above	796	0.51	▼0.45
Independent	Agusthy N. A.	619	0.40	–
Margin of victory		60,963	39.24	▲10.06
Turnout		1,56,127	82.11	▼1.46
CPI(M) hold		Swing	▲5.35	

=== 2016 ===
There were 1,77,911 registered voters in the Mattanur constituency for the 2016 Kerala Assembly election.

2016 Kerala Legislative Assembly election: Mattanur
Party	Candidate	Votes	%	±%
CPI(M)	E. P. Jayarajan	84,030	56.62	▲0.07
JD(U)	K. P. Prashanth	40,649	27.34	–
BJP	Biju Elakkuzhi	18,620	12.52	▲6.02
SDPI	Rafeekh Keecheri	3,188	2.14	▲0.07
NOTA	None of the above	1,420	0.96	New
Independent	Kodippadi Prashanth	770	0.52	–
Margin of victory		43,381	29.18	▲6.23
Turnout		1,48,677	83.57	▲0.85
CPI(M) hold		Swing	▲0.07	

=== 2011 ===
There were 1,60,771 registered voters in the Mattanur constituency for the 2011 Kerala Legislative Assembly election.

2011 Kerala Legislative Assembly election: Mattanur
Party	Candidate	Votes	%	±%
CPI(M)	E. P. Jayarajan	75,177	56.55	
SJ(D)	Joseph Chaavara	44,665	33.60	
BJP	Biju Elakkuzhi	8,707	6.55	
SDPI	Adv. K. C. Muhammad Sabeer	2,757	2.07	
Independent	Joseph	858	0.65	
BSP	Hameed	783	0.59	
Margin of victory		30,512	22.95	
Turnout		1,32,947	82.72	
CPI(M) win (new seat)				

=== 1952 ===
1952 Madras Legislative Assembly election: Mattanur
Party	Candidate	Votes	%	±%
CPI	Madhavan Nambiar, Kallorath	29,257	62.32%	
INC	Subbarao	11,430	24.35%	
Socialist Party (India)	Chattu Kutty Nambiar, Ayilath Kutteri	5,576	11.88%	
Independent	Balakrishnan Nambiar, Kudali Thazhathveethil	683	1.45%	
Margin of victory		17,827	37.97%	
Turnout		46,946	69.64%	
Registered electors		67,408		
CPI win (new seat)				

== See also ==
- Mattanur
- Kannur district
- List of constituencies of the Kerala Legislative Assembly
- 2016 Kerala Legislative Assembly election
