= Chavassery =

- Village
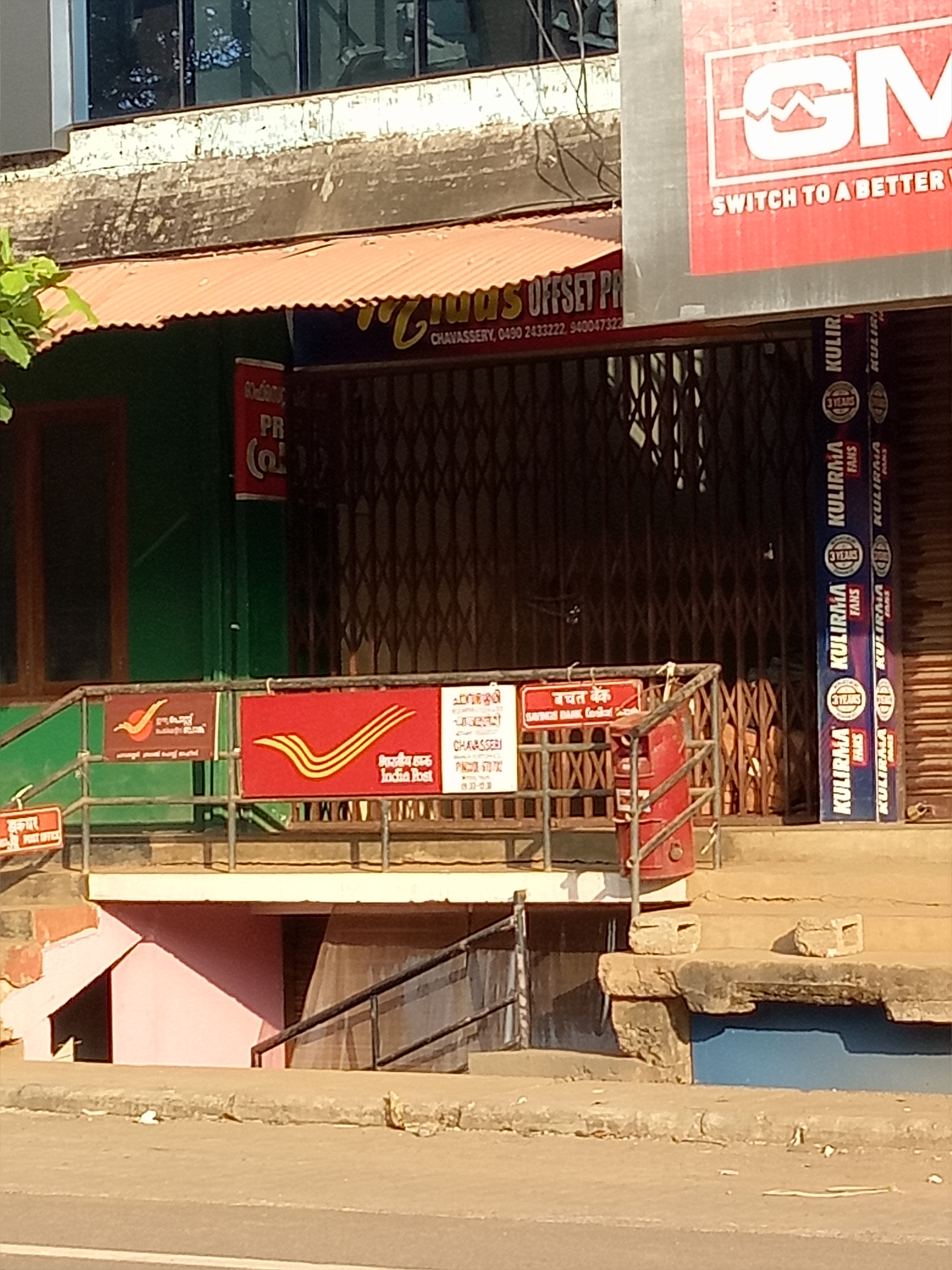
- Chavassery post office

- Location in Kerala, India Chavassery (India)
- Coordinates: 11.964700°N 75.617610°E
- Country: India
- State: Kerala
- District: Kannur

Government
  - Body: Iritty Municipality

Population (2011)
  - Total: 22,480

Languages
  - Official: Malayalam, English
- Time zone: UTC+5:30 (IST)
- ISO 3166 code: IN-KL

Chavassery is a small town in Irrity Municipality in Kannur district in the Indian state of Kerala. The village hold a place in state history due to an arson of a Kerala State Road Transport Corporation bus here in January 1970 by Communist Party of India (Marxist) workers that claimed four lives and gravely injured ten passengers.

== Demographics ==
As of 2011 India census, Chavassery had a population of 22480 with 10902 males and 11578 females. Chavassery is the part of Keezur-Chaavssery Grama Panchayath extending from Palottupalli to Keezur.

== Transportation ==
Chavassery is the main town between Mattanur and Iritty.

There are three bus stops in Chavassery: Chavassery Old Post Office, Chavassery Town, and Chavassery School Stop.

Mainly two roads start from Chavassery: Chavassery-Naduvanad road and Chavassery-Veliyambra Road. The national highway passes through Kannur town. Goa and Mumbai can be accessed on the northern side, and Cochin and Thiruvananthapuram can be accessed on the southern side. The road to the east of Iritty connects to Mysore and Bangalore.

The nearest railway station is Kannur on Mangalore-Palakkad line. Trains are available to almost all parts of India subject to advance booking over the internet.

There are airports at Mattanur (10 km away), Mangalore and Calicut. All of them are international airports, but direct flights are available only to Middle Eastern countries.
