= Koloyad =

Kolayad Kolayad (കോളയാട്)
- village
- Location in Kerala, India
- Coordinates: 11.8541°N 75.7008°E
- Country: India
- State: Kerala
- District: Kannur

Government
  - Type: Panchayati raj (India)
  - Body: Kolayad Grama Panchayat

Area
  - Total: 16.85 km^{2} (6.51 sq mi)

Population (2011)
  - Total: 12,616
  - Density: 748.7/km^{2} (1,939/sq mi)

Languages
  - Official: Malayalam, English
- Time zone: UTC+5:30 (IST)
- ISO 3166 code: IN-KL

Kolayad is a village in Kannur district in the Indian state of Kerala.

The village contains St. George Orthodox Church, affiliated with the Malankara Orthodox Syrian Church.

== Demographics ==
As of 2011 Census, Kolayad had a population of 12,616, with 5,977 (47.4%) males and 6,639 (52.6%) females. Kolayad village has an area of 16.85 km^{2} (6.51 sq mi) with 2,915 families residing in it. Average male female sex ratio was 1111 higher than the state average of 1084. In Kolayad, 9.77% of the population was under 6 years of age. Kolayad had an average literacy of 90.6% lower than the state average of 94%; male literacy was 94% and female literacy was 87.7%.

== Transportation ==
The national highway passes through Kannur town. Mangalore and Mumbai can be accessed on the northern side and Cochin and Thiruvananthapuram can be accessed on the southern side. The road to the east of Iritty connects to Mysore and Bangalore. The nearest railway station is Thalassery, Kannur on Mangalore-Palakkad line. There are airports at Kannur Airport Mangalore and Calicut.
