= Pattannur =

Pattannur pattanur
- village
- Location in Kerala, India Pattannur (India)
- Coordinates: 11°57′0″N 75°30′0″E
- Country: India
- State: Kerala
- District: Kannur

Area
  - Total: 23.55 km^{2} (9.09 sq mi)

Population (2011)
  - Total: 15,003
  - Density: 637.1/km^{2} (1,650/sq mi)

Languages
  - Official: Malayalam, English
- Time zone: UTC+5:30 (IST)
- ISO 3166 code: IN-KL

Pattannur is a village in Kannur district in the Indian state of Kerala. It is 4 km away from Irikkur and 7 km away from Mattanur.

== Demographics ==
As of 2011 Census, Pattannur had a population of 15,003 with 7,177 males and 7,826 females. Pattannur village has an area of 23.55 km^{2} (9.09 sq mi) with 3,110 families residing in it. The average male female sex ratio was 1090 higher than the state average of 1084. In Pattannur, 12.6% of the population was under 6 years of age. Pattannur had an average literacy of 94.26% higher than the state average of 94.00%: male literacy was 97.26% and female literacy was 91.55%.

== Transportation ==
The national highway passes through Taliparamba town. Mangalore and Mumbai can be accessed on the northern side and Cochin and Thiruvananthapuram can be accessed on the southern side. The road to the east connects to Mysore and Bangalore. The nearest railway station is Kannur on Mangalore-Palakkad line. The nearest airport is Kannur International Airport, which is 13 km (8.1 mi) from Pattannur.

== See also ==
- Irikkur
- Ayippuzha
