= Rathish Ambat =

Indian film director and producer

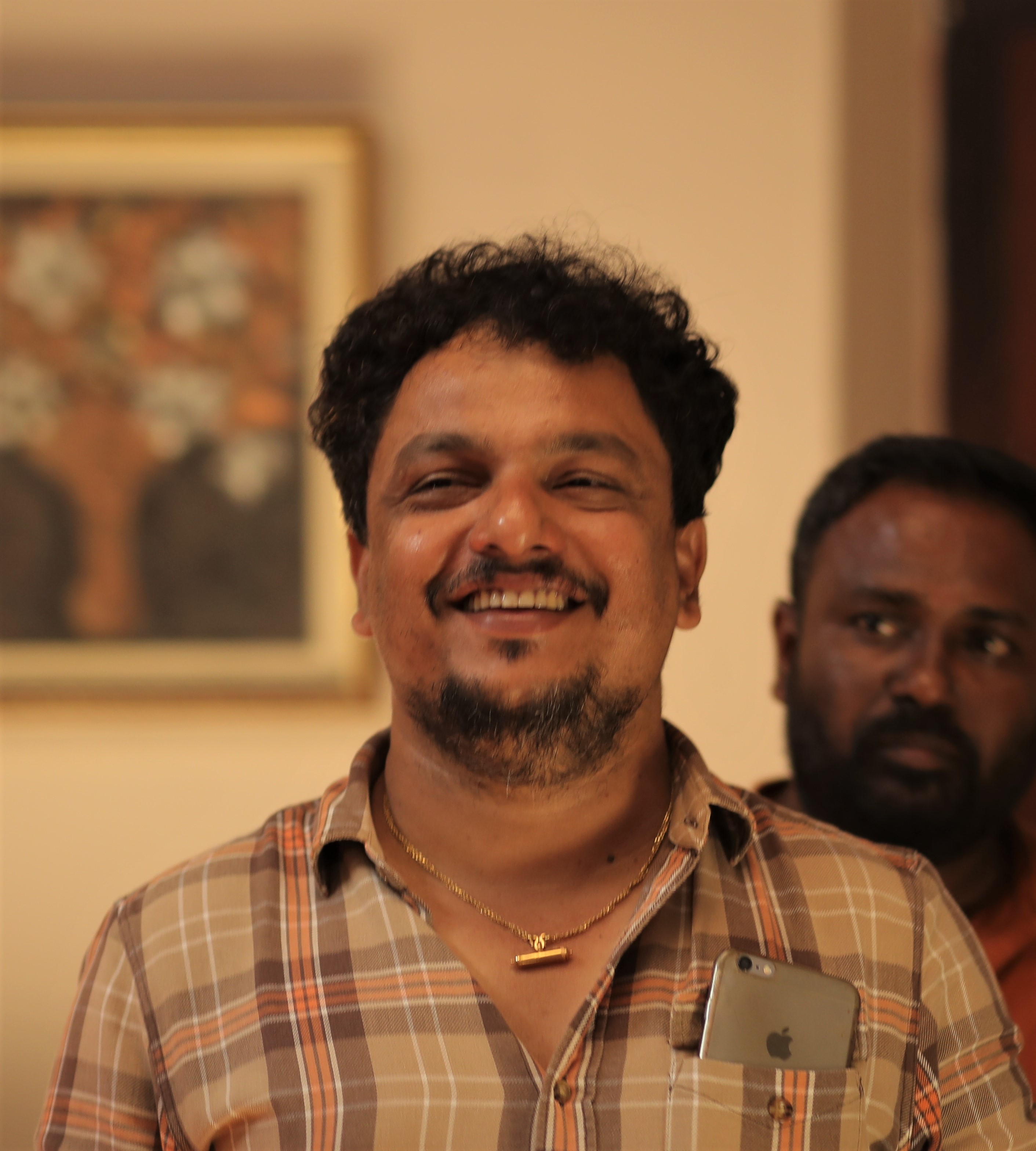
- Born: Taliparamba, Kannur district, Kerala
- Occupations: Film Director, Film Producer
- Years active: 1999–present

Rathish Ambat is an Indian film director, ad film director, and producer who works predominantly in the Malayalam film industry. He is well known for his debut film Kammara Sambhavam which was released on 14 April 2018. Over the past twenty years, he has contributed to various roles in the film and advertising industries in Kerala. He has directed advertising films in several languages, such as Malayalam, Tamil, Telugu, and Hindi.

== Career ==
Rathish Ambat began his career in the film industry as an assistant director in the early 2000s and subsequently progressed to the role of associate director. He has collaborated with prominent Malayalam directors like Lal Jose, Blessy, and Shyamaprasad on various projects. Among the notable Malayalam films he has contributed to are Narasimham (2000), Meesha Madhavan (2002), Mistress of Spice (2006), Ore Kadal (2007), and Calcutta News(2008).

In 2013 Ambat co-produced the film Ezhu Sundara Rathrikal directed by Lal Jose. In 2015, Ambat's most popular project ‘The Great Backwaters' campaign for the Kerala Tourism board to promote the backwaters of Kerala went on to receive the Silver at the Golden Gate awards at the Internationale Tourismus-Börse Berlin (ITB-Berlin). He made his directorial movie debut through the Malayalam movie Kammara Sambhavam which won the National Film Award for Best Production Design and the Kerala State Film Awards for Best Costume Designer and Best Art Director. He called the film "a satire that has politics, history and cinema". The film won an award at the 66th National Film Awards.

His second film Theerppu was originally designed for an OTT premiere, was later released in theaters on August 25, 2022. The film starred Prithviraj, Isha Talwar, and Indrajith.

His latest directorial project, Mindscapes, an anthology based on the works of the renowned Malayalam writer M.T. Vasudevan Nair, is scheduled to release in 2024.

== Filmography ==
Key
†	Denotes films that have not yet been released

=== As director ===
Year	Title	Cast	Notes
2018	Kammara Sambhavam	Dileep, Siddharth, Murali Gopy, Namitha Pramod	
2022	Theerppu	Prithviraj Sukumaran, Indrajith Sukumaran, Saiju Kurup	
2024	Manorathangal	Indrajith Sukumaran, Ann Augustine, Aparna Balamurali	Anthology series Segment:"Kadal Kattu"

=== As co-producer ===
Year	Title	Cast	Notes
2013	Ezhu Sundara Rathrikal	Dileep & Rima Kallingal	Co-Producer
2022	Theerppu	Prithviraj Sukumaran & Isha Talwar	Co-Producer
2025	Ronth	Dileesh Pothan & Roshan Mathew	Co-Producer

== Awards ==
- ITB Berlin Golden Gate Award, Kerala Tourism Ad film - 2015.
