= Mamta Mohandas =

Indian actress (born 1984)

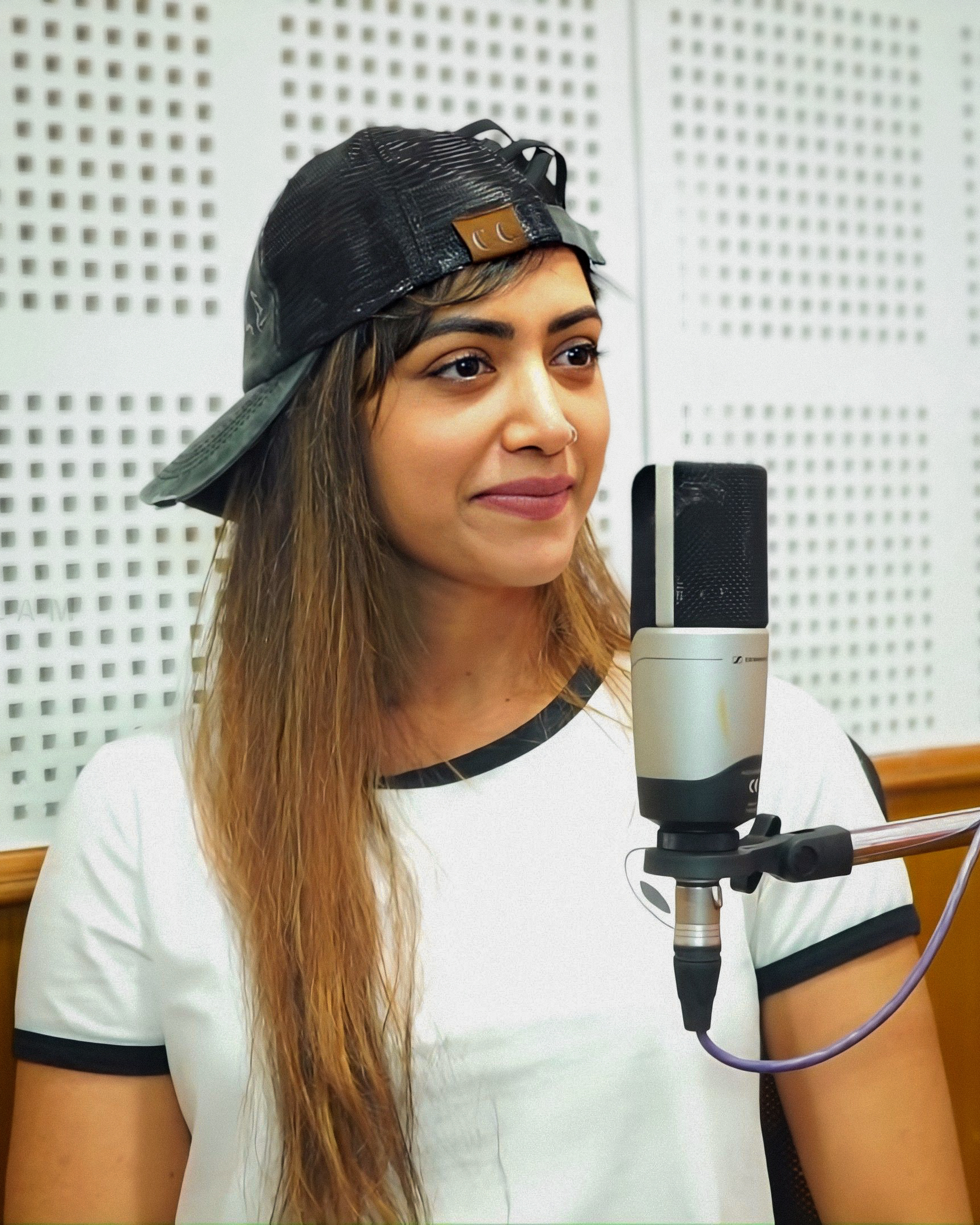
- Mamta at a Red FM interview in 2020
- Born: 14 November 1984 (age 41); Manama, Bahrain
- Citizenship: India
- Education: Mount Carmel College, Bangalore
- Occupations: Actress; Playback singer; Film producer
- Years active: 2005–present
- Spouse: Prajith Padmanabhan (m. 2011; div. 2012)

Mamta Mohandas (born 14 November 1984) is an Indian actress, producer and playback singer who primarily works in Malayalam, Tamil and Telugu films. Mamta is a recipient of several awards including a Kerala State Film Award and two Filmfare Awards South.

Mamta made her acting debut with Mayookham (2005) and had her breakthrough with Kadha Thudarunnu (2010), which earned her the Filmfare Award for Best Actress – Malayalam and Kerala State Film Award for Second Best Actress. She has since appeared in successful films such as Arike (2012), My Boss (2012), Two Countries (2015), Udaharanam Sujatha (2017), Carbon (2018), Nine (2019), Kodathi Samaksham Balan Vakeel (2019), Forensic (2020), Jana Gana Mana (2022) and Maharaja (2024).

== Early life ==
Mamta was born on 14 November 1984 in Manama, Bahrain, to Malayali parents (Mohandas and Ganga) from Thalassery, Kannur. She attended the Indian School, Bahrain, until 2002. She then pursued a bachelor's degree in computer science at Mount Carmel College, Bangalore.

Mamta modeled for print ads for companies such as IBM and Kalyan Kendra and modeled on the ramp for the Mysore Maharajah and Raymonds. She is trained in Carnatic music and in Hindustani music.

== Film career ==
=== Acting ===
Mohandas debuted in the 2005 Malayalam film Mayookham, directed by Hariharan. The film did not do well at the box office.

Subsequently, she acted alongside Mammootty in Bus Conductor, with Suresh Gopi in the films Adbutham (2006) and Lanka (2006), and alongside Jayaram in Madhuchandralekha (2006). She also played the female lead in Baba Kalyani with Mohanlal. Later that year, she débuted in the Tamil film industry, starring in the Karu Pazhaniappan directed film Sivappathigaram.

In 2007 she acted with Mammootty in the film Big B. She eventually stepped into the Telugu film industry as well, when she appeared in a supporting role in the film Yamadonga, directed by SS Rajamouli. She had lent her voice for a couple of songs in this film too. In 2008, she appeared in 7 films, predominantly in Telugu-language films. Her first release was her début Kannada film Gooli. She then starred in the film Krishnarjuna, playing the lead female role. Victory was her next assignment as lead actress, following which she appeared in a cameo role in her only Tamil release that year, Kuselan. Three more Telugu releases featured Mamta, including Homam, directed by JD Chakravarthy and Srinu Vaitla's King.

In 2009, she starred in the comedy film Guru En Aalu alongside Madhavan, and the thriller Passenger, sharing screen space with Dileep and Sreenivasan, respectively. The film Passenger, in which she played the role of a television reporter, became a turning point in Mohandas's career. She was initially approached to play the lead role in the 2009 Telugu dark fantasy Arundathi. She refused the offer, and the movie went on to become one of the highest grossers that year. In 2010, she worked with Jayaram in Kadha Thudarunnu directed by Sathyan Anthikkad, for which she won her first Best Actress Award from Filmfare. This film also won her the Kerala State Film Award for Second Best Actress, the Vanitha award for best actress – Malayalam, the Mathrubhumi award for best actress – Malayalam and the Asianet award for the best actress- Malayalam. Other projects in 2010 included Musafir with Rahman, Anwar with Prithiviraj, and Kedi with Nagarjuna. Mamta's first film in 2011 was the Malayalam film Race, in which she played the role of Niya, wife of a cardio surgeon Abey (Kunchacko Boban). The film failed to do well at the box office. Her next release in Malayalam was Naayika. In 2012, she appeared in her third Tamil film, Thadaiyara Thaakka, directed by Magizh Thirumeni. In 2013 she starred in Paisa Paisa with Indrajith. In 2014 she starred in To Noora with Love as a Muslim character.

Mohandas made a comeback to Malayalam movie industry with Ranjith Shankar's Mammooty starrer Varsham. She shared her screen space again with Dileep in Two Countries after doing My Boss with him.

In 2016, Mohandas starred opposite Mammootty in Thoppil Joppan, and in early 2017, she signed Crossroad, an anthology film in which she plays an orthodox Muslim. She also appeared in an extended cameo in Udaharanam Sujatha with Manju Warrier. In mid-2017, she signed Detroit Crossing aka Ranam opposite Prithviraj, but had to opt out because she did not have fresh dates to allocate for the project.

In 2020 Mohandas acted in the crime thriller feature film Forensic in which she played the role of police officer Rithika Xavier IPS.

=== Singing ===
Mohandas is trained in Carnatic and Hindustani music, and first sang playback in the Telugu film Rakhi, singing the title song under Devi Sri Prasad's direction, making her debut in the Telugu film industry as a singer before making her acting debut in Telugu. She went on to win the 2006 Filmfare Best Female Playback Singer Award for that song.

Subsequently, she was asked to sing several songs for composer Devi Sri Prasad, including "Akalesthe Annam Pedtha" for the Chiranjeevi-starrer Shankardada Zindabad (later dubbed as Daddy Mummy in the Tamil film Villu), "36-24-36" for the film Jagadam, "Mia" for Tulasi, and "Ghanana (Funny)" and the title song for the film King. Other music directors she has worked with include M. M. Keeravani (for her own films Yamadonga and Krishnarjuna, also Chandamama), R. P. Patnaik (for Andamaina Mansulo), Chakri (for Victory), Nithin Raikwar (for her own film Homam) and Thaman (for Jayeebhava).

In Tamil, she sang "Kaalai Kaalai" in the film Kaalai, which starred Silambarasan in the lead role. She sang "Idai Vazhi" for the comedy film Goa under noted composer Yuvan Shankar Raja's direction. Both songs featured her singing alongside Benny Dayal. She was heard for the first time in her mother tongue, Malayalam, in the 2010 film Anwar. She has also recorded a song for her film Thriller. In the film 'Mohabath', she sang a duet with Hariharan. She sang "Iravil Viriyum" in her 2012 film Arike. She sang "Karuppana Kannazhagi" in the film Aadupuliyattam.

== Personal life ==
Mamta got engaged to Prajith Padmanabhan, a Bahrain-based businessman, on 11 November 2011. The couple got married on 28 December 2011 in Thalassery. They got divorced in December 2012. In June 2024, Mamta revealed that she is in a relationship.

Mamta is a cancer survivor, and has battled Hodgkin lymphoma since 2010. In April 2013, her cancer relapsed and she underwent treatment at UCLA. Since 2014, she has resided in Los Angeles. In 2023, she revealed that she had been diagnosed with Vitiligo.

== Filmography ==
=== Films ===
Year	Title	Role	Language	Notes	Ref.
2005	Mayookham	Indira	Malayalam		
2005	Bus Conductor	Celina	Malayalam		
2006	Lanka	Lanka Lakshmi	Malayalam		
2006	Madhuchandralekha	Indulekha	Malayalam		
2006	Sivappathigaram	Charulatha	Tamil	Credited as Mamta	
2006	Baba Kalyani	Madhumitha Ashokan	Malayalam		
2007	Big B	Rimi Tomy	Malayalam		
2007	Yamadonga	Dhanalakshmi	Telugu		
2008	Gooli	Ramya	Kannada		
2008	Krishnarjuna	Sathya	Telugu		
2008	Victory	Janaki	Telugu		
2008	Kuselan/ Kathanayakudu	Assistant director	Tamil, Telugu	Cameo appearance	
2008	Homam	Dr. Mahalakshmi	Telugu		
2008	Chintakayala Ravi	Lavanya	Telugu		
2008	King	Swapna/Pooja	Telugu		
2009	Guru En Aalu	Seema	Tamil		
2009	Passenger	Anuradha Menon	Malayalam		
2010	Kedi	Janaki	Telugu		
2010	Kadha Thudarunnu	Vidya Lakshmi	Malayalam		
2010	Nirakazhcha	Shilpa	Malayalam		
2010	Anwar	Ayesha Begum	Malayalam		
2010	The Thriller	Herself	Malayalam	Special appearance	
2010	Karayilekku Oru Kadal Dooram	Gaadha	Malayalam		
2011	Race	Niya	Malayalam		
2011	Naayika	Aleena	Malayalam		
2012	Padmasree Bharat Dr. Saroj Kumar	Neelima Saroj Kumar	Malayalam		
2012	Njanum Ente Familiyum	Dr. Priya	Malayalam		
2012	Arike	Anuradha	Malayalam		
2012	Thadaiyara Thaakka	Priya	Tamil		
2012	Jawan of Vellimala	Anitha	Malayalam		
2012	My Boss	Priya S. Nair	Malayalam		
2013	Celluloid	Janet Daniel	Malayalam		
2013	Ladies and Gentleman	Anu	Malayalam		
2013	Musafir	Anupama Gopalakrishnan Nair	Malayalam		
2013	Paisa Paisa	Surya	Malayalam		
2014	To Noora with Love	Noorjahan (Noora)	Malayalam		
2014	Varsham	Dr. Jayasree	Malayalam		
2015	Two Countries	Laya	Malayalam		
2016	Thoppil Joppan	Maria Varkey	Malayalam		
2017	Udaharanam Sujatha	Deepa M	Malayalam		
2017	Crossroad	Badarunneesa	Malayalam	Segment: "Badar"	
2017	Goodalochana	Padma	Malayalam		
2018	Carbon	Sameera	Malayalam		
2018	Neeli	Lakshmi	Malayalam		
2018	Johny Johny Yes Appa	Amala Jayakumar	Malayalam		
2019	Nine	Annie Lewis	Malayalam		
2019	Kodathi Samaksham Balan Vakeel	Anuradha Sudharshan	Malayalam		
2020	Forensic	Rithika Xavier IPS	Malayalam		
2021	Adbutham	Maria	Malayalam	Censored in 2005 released in 2021 Amazon Prime Video direct OTT release	
2021	Bhramam	Simi	Malayalam		
2021	Enemy	Anisha Rajiv	Tamil		
2021	Lalbagh	Sara	Malayalam		
2021	Sunny	Dr. Anuradha	Malayalam		
2021	Meow	Sulekha	Malayalam		
2022	Jana Gana Mana	Saba Mariyam	Malayalam		
2022	Theerppu	Dr. Shwetha	Malayalam	Voice role	
2023	Maheshum Marutiyum	Gauri	Malayalam		
2023	Live	Dr. Amala	Malayalam		
2023	Rudrangi	Jwala Bhai Deshmukh	Telugu		
2023	Otta	Unnamed	Malayalam		
2023	Bandra	Sakshi	Malayalam		
2024	Maharaja	Aasifa	Tamil		

=== Television ===
- All series are in Malayalam unless otherwise noted.

Year	Title	Role	Notes	Ref.
2012	Kaiyil Oru Kodi	Host	Tamil	
2016	Kerala Cancer	Singer		
2016	D 4 Dance Reloaded	Judge		
2017	D 4 Dance: Junior v/s Senior	Judge		
2017	Hand of God	Mamta	Short film	
2023	Star Singer 9	Judge	Launch episode only	

== Discography ==
Year	Song	Film	Music director	Co-singer	Language
2006	"Rakhi Rakhi"	Rakhi	Devi Sri Prasad	Devi Sri Prasad	Telugu
2007	"Akalesthey Annam Pedatha"	Shankar Dada Zindabad	Devi Sri Prasad	Solo	Telugu
2007	"36-24-36"	Jagadam	Devi Sri Prasad	Solo	Telugu
2007	"Olammi Tikkareginda"	Yamadonga	M. M. Keeravani	Jr. NTR	Telugu
2007	"Sakkubaayine"	Chandamama	K. M. Radha Krishnan	Jassie Gift	Telugu
2007	"Mia"	Tulasi	Devi Sri Prasad	Naveen	Telugu
2008	"Buggalerrabada"	Krishnarjuna	M. M. Keeravani	M. M. Keeravani	Telugu
2008	"Ghanana (Funny)"	King	Devi Sri Prasad	Solo	Telugu
2008	"King"	King	Devi Sri Prasad	Lesie Lewis	Telugu
2008	"Andamaina Manasulo"	Andamaina Mansulo	R. P. Patnaik	Solo	Telugu
2008	"Sunley Zara "	Victory	Chakri	Naveen	Telugu
2008	"Jenifer Laa"	Victory	Chakri	Nithin, Shashank	Telugu
2008	"Yey Mister Ninne"	Homam	Nithin Raikwar	Nihal, Shivani	Telugu
2008	"Kalai"	Kaalai	G. V. Prakash Kumar	Benny Dayal	Tamil
2009	"Gundelona"	Jayeebhava	S.Thaman	Megha, Priya, Janani	Telugu
2009	"Daddy Mummy"	Villu	Devi Sri Prasad	Naveen	Tamil
2010	Kadhalu Nidurinje	Ennadiki (Album)	Vijay Karun	Solo	Telugu
2010	"Idai Vazhi"	Goa	Yuvan Shankar Raja	Benny Dayal	Tamil
2010	"Njan"	Anwar	Gopi Sundar	Prithviraj Sukumaran	Malayalam
2010	"Priyankari"	The Thriller	Dharan Kumar	Haricharan	Malayalam
2010	"Priyankari"(Remix)	The Thriller	Dharan Kumar	Benny Dayal	Malayalam
2012	"Iravil Viriyum"	Arike	Ouseppachan	Solo	Malayalam
2012	"Kan Thurannoru Kalyani"	Mullassery Madhavan Kutty Nemom P. O.	Ratheesh Vegha	Solo	Malayalam
2013	"Most Wanted"	Bhai	Devi Sri Prasad	Narendra	Telugu
2015	"Karuppana Kannazhagi"	Aadupuliyattam	Ratheesh Vegha	Solo	Malayalam
2019	Hei Diddle	Aniyan Kunjinu Thannalayathu	M. Jayachandran	Solo	Malayalam
2020	Thedal	Thedal (Music Video)	Sachin Warrier	Sachin Warrier	Malayalam
2020	Rumaal Ambili	Lalbagh	Rahul Raj	Zia Ul Haq	Malayalam
2023	Alapanam	Live	Alphons Joseph	Solo	Malayalam

== Media image and other work ==
Mamta is considered among the highest-paid Malayalam actresses. In the Kochi Times Most Desirable Women list, she was placed 7th in 2017, 5th in 2018, 8th in 2019, and 17th in 2020. In 2011, she became the brand ambassador of Kochi International Fashion Week. In 2013, she became the brand ambassador for Kerala Strikers in Celebrity Cricket League.

Mohandas started working on television, by hosting the quiz show Kaiyil Oru Kodi in 2012, which was later cancelled. She has also judged two seasons of D 4 Dance. In 2020, Mamta launched her own production company Mamta Mohandas Productions.

== Accolades ==
Kerala State Film Awards

- 2010: Kerala State Film Award for Second Best Actress – Kadha Thudarunnu.

Asianet Film Awards

- 2010: Most Popular Actress – Kadha Thudarunnu.
- 2013: Most Popular Actress – My Boss and Arike.

Filmfare Awards South

- 2006: Best Female Playback Singer – Telugu – Rakhi.
- 2010: Best Actress – Malayalam – Kadha Thudarunnu.

Vanitha Film Awards

- 2011: Best Actress – Kadha Thudarunnu.
- 2016: Best Star Pair (with Dileep)– Two Countries.
- 2020: Special Performance Female – Kodathi Samaksham Balan Vakeel and Nine.

Asiavision Awards

- 2016: Woman of the Year.
- 2017: Pride of South India.

Mathrubhumi - Kalyan Silks Chalachithra Awards

- 2010: Best Actress – Kadha Thudarunnu.

Asianet Comedy Awards

- 2016: Best Actress - Two Countries.
