= Darvinte Parinamam =

2016 film by JoJo Antony

- Theatrical release poster
- Directed by: Jijo Antony
- Written by: Jijo Antony; Manoj Nair
- Produced by: Prithviraj Sukumaran; Santhosh Sivan; Arya; Shaji Nadesan
- Starring: Prithviraj Sukumaran; Chemban Vinod Jose; Chandini Sreedharan; Hannah Reji Koshy; Balu Varghese
- Cinematography: Abinandhan Ramanujam
- Music by: Sankar Sharma
- Production company: August Cinema
- Distributed by: August Cinema
- Release date: 18 March 2016
- Running time: 155 minutes
- Country: India
- Language: Malayalam

Darvinte Parinamam (transl. Darwin's Evolution) is a 2016 Indian Malayalam-language action comedy film directed by Jijo Antony. It stars Prithviraj Sukumaran in the lead role along with Chemban Vinod Jose, in title role and Chandini Sreedharan, and Balu Varghese in supporting roles. Written by Manoj Nair, it revolves around the life of an ordinary man and a local goon, and how their lives are affected by some unfortunate events. The soundtrack and background score for the film are composed by Shankar Sharma. The film started rolling in Fort Kochi from 1 October 2015.

Produced jointly by Prithviraj, Santhosh Sivan, Arya, and Shaji Nadesan under the banner of August Cinema, Darvinte Parinamam was released on 18 March 2016. The film is about Anil Anto, a TV operator who moves to Kochi with his pregnant wife in order to start a new life. Here, post an unfortunate incident, Anil crosses paths with Darvin, a crime boss.

== Plot ==
Anil Anto and his wife Amala shift from Kottarakara and settle down with the help of his friends in Kochi. They rent a small apartment and slowly settle down to their lives. Anil works for a cable TV company as a technician. "Gorilla" Darwin is a well known gangster, who, along with his brothers, rules the Kochi underworld. Meanwhile, Amala is pregnant, and she and her husband are very happy. During a drive by, Darvin's brother steals Amala's chain and pushes her down, causing a miscarriage. Their lives turn due to this incident. They complain to the police, but to no avail. During an installation, Anil sees the person who caused this problem. He chases them and gets into a fight. He brutally beats him up and takes him to the police. The police inspector is a cousin of Darvin and abuses Anil for beating up a culprit. He then calls up Darvin to come to pick up his brother. Darvin picks his brother from the police station and insults Anil by giving some money for Anil to get his wife a new chain. Anil slaps Darvin, which causes a scene. Darvin retreats back. Anil then faces Darvin's wrath. Darvin and the gang slowly steal every belonging from Anil and leave them with just an empty apartment. Anil loses all his possessions. A friendly policeman then explains that this is Darvin's style of reacting and he cannot do anything about it. After all this, Anil takes help from a small-time gangster to try to kidnap Darvin's child and fails spectacularly in a comedic fashion. They decide to kidnap Darvin's younger brother Gilli, who is a film buff. They make a ransom call to Darvin, only to be rebutted. While browsing through the photos on Gilli's phone, Anil finds the photo of a golden statue belonging to the church in their area. He realises that Darvin in the pretext of repairing the church has switched the golden one for a duplicate statue and holds the golden one in his chicken farm. Anil then steals this statue from the farm and starts negotiating with Darvin, knowing that Darvin has a deal fixed to sell this statue to a foreign customer. He asks Darvin to give him his stuff, not new but the exact items were stolen from him. Beginning a cat-and-mouse game, pushing Darvin's patience. The final item is Anil's bike, which was stolen from him and sold to Darvin's rival. Darvin fights with his rival Solomon to get the bike back. However, as Solomon tries to kill Darvin, Anil intervenes and helps Darvin out. Darvin initially plans to finish Anil for good once he tells him the location of the golden statue; however, he has a change of heart after Anil helps him out. Then there is a big turn in events as Darvin and his goons are taken by the police for stealing the statue because Anil finked. The movie ends with Anil helping Darvin to convey his feelings to his love and marrying her.

== Cast ==
- Prithviraj Sukumaran as Anil Anto
- Chemban Vinod Jose as "Gorilla" Darwin
- Chandini Sreedharan as Amala Anil
- Hannah Reji Koshy as Ancy
- Shammi Thilakan as Ayyappan aka "Kidnapper" Ayyappan
- Balu Varghese as Ravi
- Soubin Shahir as Williams
- Mamukkoya as Hassan Koya
- Sudhi Koppa as Appunni
- Poojappura Ravi as Priest
- Dharmajan Bolgatty as Bhaskaran, Ayyappan's ally
- Hareesh Perumanna as Chellappan, Ayyappan's ally
- Murugan Martin as Tony, Darwin's henchman
- Sethu Lakshmi as Anil's mother
- Subeesh Sudhi as "Negative" Thomman
- Vavita Vijayan as Princy
- Sajid Yahya as Dixon
- Sabumon Abdusamad as CI Jackson
- Jaffar Idukki as Majeed
- Pradeep Kottayam as Parthan
- Thesni Khan as Parthan's wife
- Poojappura Ravi as Father Charles
- Balaji Sarma as Babu, Police Constable
- Sumangal as Metro Rail Worker
- Binu Adimaly as Jayan
- Anjana Appukuttan as Valsamma
- Nandu as Saji
- Anal Arasu as Solomon, Darvin's enemy (Cameo appearance)
- Manivarnan
- Lijo Jose Pellissery as himself
- Shaji Nadesan as Pranchi (cameo)

== Music ==
Darvinte Parinamam

Soundtrack album by Sankar Sharma
- Released: 3 March 2016
- Genre: Feature film soundtrack
- Length: 12:28
- Language: Malayalam
- Label: Satyam Audios

The original songs were composed by Sankar Sharma, who had sung Athala Pithala song in Double Barrel (2015). Songs are labelled by Satyam Audios and were released on 3 March 2016.

No.	Title	Lyrics	Singer(s)	Length
1.	"Ta Ta Ta Tang"	P S Rafeeq	Nakul Krishnamoorthi	3:26
2.	"Kathangal Kinavil"	Harinarayanan B K	Haricharan	3:52
3.	"Manjin Kurunne"	P S Rafeeq	Vijay Yesudas	2:54
4.	"Oh Puniyala"	Arun Ittianath & Pious Guit	Arun Ittianath, Arun Haridas Kamath, Aashima Mahajan, Niyati Kaul, Pious Guit & Sankar Sharma	2:56
Total length:				12:28

== Production ==
Directed by Jijo Antony of Konthayum Poonoolum. Prithviraj Sukumaran and Chemban Vinod Jose does the lead roles, while Chandini Sreedharan was selected as the female lead against Prithviraj. Prithviraj, Santhosh Sivan, Arya, and Shaji Nadesan signed to produce the film under the production and distribution company August Cinema. Filming commenced on 1 October at Fort Kochi in Ernakulam.

== Critical reception ==
The Times of India rated it 3.0 out of 5.0 and said "Director Jijo Antony's Darvinte Parinamam might have a formulaic story of the protagonist leading a happy life till a villain wreaks havoc. The hero then evolves and seeks salvation. What makes this film different is the perspective from which it is intentionally told. The story and concept hold promise, but the execution falters due to the lack of clarity in the script and direction. The emotional turmoil that Prithviraj's character undergoes after a tragedy obviously has the audience rooting for him and sympathizing less for Darvin. The latter's perspective, crudely shown, seems diluted to glorify the movie's apparent hero".
