= Khais Millen =

Indian filmmaker

- Born: Thiruvananthapuram
- Citizenship: India
- Education: Mar Ivanios College
- Occupations: Film director; film producer; screenwriter; lyricist
- Years active: 2018
- Title: Founder of Mania Movie Magix International; Co-founder of ManiaLab
- Website: khaismillen.com

Khais Millen is an Indian film writer and director who has been active in Malayalam cinema since 2018.

== Biography ==
In 2014 Millen wrote and directed the short Lipstick, a film about child sexual abuse.

Aakashvani (2016) was his first full-length feature film as director. Starring Kavya Madhavan in lead, it was a family drama which was commercially unsuccessful at the box office, and later aired on Flowers TV.

During the COVID-19 pandemic, Millen directed a thriller film Thala, his second feature film, prized at the 52d Kerala State Film Awards.

After Thala, his second screenplay was Adithattu, a seafaring film directed by Jijo Antony, starring Shine Tom Chacko and Sunny Wayne leads. The film was awarded Second Best Film at the 53rd Kerala State Film Awards.

He then wrote and directed Paradise Circus, about life in a circus, which was released in 2023.

== Filmography ==
Year	Title	Language	Director	Writer	Producer	Notes
2014	Lipstick	Malayalam	Yes	Yes	Yes	Short
2016	Aakashvani	Malayalam	Yes	No	No	Debut Movie
2021	Thala	Malayalam	Yes	Yes	Yes	Best Child Artist, 52nd Kerala State Film Awards
2022	Adithattu	Malayalam	No	Yes	No	Second Best Film, 53rd Kerala State Film Awards
2023	Paradise Circus	Malayalam	Yes	Yes	Yes	
