= Vishnu Mohan =

Indian film director (born 1987)

- Citizenship: Indian
- Occupation: Director

Vishnu Mohan (born 12 June 1987) is an Indian film director who works in the Malayalam film industry. He is best known for directing the political drama Meppadiyan (2022), which won the National Film Award for Best Debut Film of a Director.

== Early life ==
Vishnu Mohan was born on 12 June 1987 in Adoor, Kerala, India. He completed his bachelor's degree in Commerce from St. Cyril's College, Adoor. Before entering the film industry, he was involved in theatre and short films, which helped shape his interest in filmmaking. Mohan is married to Abhirami Radhakrishnan on 2023. The wedding was attended by members of the Malayalam film industry.

== Career ==
Vishnu Mohan made his feature film directorial debut with Meppadiyan (2022), starring Unni Mukundan. The film received critical attention for its political narrative and realism, and won the National Film Award for Best Debut Film of a Director at the 69th National Film Awards.

Following the success of Meppadiyan, Vishnu directed Kadha Innuvare (2023), a relationship drama starring Biju Menon and Methil Devika. The film explored themes of companionship and emotional intimacy.

In 2026, it was announced that Vishnu Mohan would direct Mohanlal in the film L 367. In interviews, he stated that the film is inspired by multiple real-life incidents and is not a conventional army-based narrative.

== Filmography ==
Year	Title	Notes	Ref.
2022	Meppadiyan	Won National Film Award for Best Debut Film of a Director	
2024	Kadha Innuvare	Remake of 2018 Telugu-film C/o Kancharapalem by Venkatesh Maha	
2027	Operation Ganga †	Also writer	
