= Adithattu =

- Official Poster
- Directed by: Jijo Antony
- Written by: Khais Millen
- Produced by: Susan Joseph; Sin Treesa; Jijo Anthony; Vineesh Vijayan
- Starring: Shine Tom Chacko; Sunny Wayne; V. I. S. Jayapalan; Alexander Prasanth; Mullan Ani; Joseph Yesudas; Murugan Martine; Sabumon Abdusamad
- Cinematography: Pappinu
- Edited by: Noufal Abullah; Sarath Geetha Lal
- Music by: Nezer Ahemed; Sreehari
- Production company: Middle March Studios Kanayil Films
- Distributed by: Capital Films
- Release date: 1 July 2022
- Running time: 90 minutes
- Country: India
- Language: Malayalam

Adithattu is a 2022 Indian Malayalam-language action thriller film directed by Jijo Antony and starring Shine Tom Chacko, Sunny Wayne and Alexander Prasanth in lead roles.

== Cast ==
- Shine Tom Chacko as Ambross (Fishermen)
- Sunny Wayne ad Marcos ( Fishermen), The main antagonist
- V. I. S. Jayapalan as Dinkan
- Alexander Prasanth as Srank Raayan
- Mullan Ani as Mulan
- Joseph Yesudas as Kambli
- Murugan Martine as Nelson
- Sabumon Abdusamad

== Plot ==
Sailing among the inlets of the Arabian ocean, seven fishermen start arguing. Their former skipper has been murdered and they start to suspect one another.

== Reception ==
A critic from The Times of India wrote that "The film focuses quite a bit on the fishermen's work in the deep sea and their personalities, with the story feeling like an afterthough". A critic from Manorama Online wrote that "The movie has done complete justice to the subject it deals with and the treatment it has pitched". A critic from Cinema Express wrote that "Adithattu has two principal advantages: a nail-biting third act and a 90-min duration".

== Awards ==
Year	Award/Festival	Category	Recipient	Ref
2023	53rd Kerala State Film Awards	Second Best Film	Jijo Antony	

=== Nominations ===
The film was also nominated for Best Experimental film at the 2022 WSXA Amnesty International Film Awards and in the same category at the San Antonio Independent Film Festival (Ecuador).

== Music ==
Adithattu

Soundtrack album by Nezer Ahamed & Sreehari
- Released: 1 May 2022
- Recorded: 2022–2023
- Studio: My Studio
- Genre: Film soundtrack
- Length: 7:57
- Language: Malayalam
- Labels: Middle March Studios & Manorama Music
External audio
- Adithattu (Official Audio Song) on YouTube

Singles from Adithattu
- 1. "Aanju Valikkada Laisa" Released: 1 May 2022; 2. "Theerathai" Released: 13 Feb 2025

=== Songs ===
The songs were composed by Nezer Ahamed produced and arranged by Nezer Ahamed.

==== Original version ====
Adithattu

No.	Title	Lyrics	Music	Singer(s)	Length
1.	"Aanju Valikkada Laisa"	Nezer Ahemed; Jerson Yesudas; Lakshmi Cheriyedath	Nezer Ahamed	Jassie Gift	4:13
2.	"Theerathai"	Sharfu	Sreehari K	Sreehari K	3:44

== Reception ==
This movie had resemblances with Kondal

The New Indian Express called the film a "(g)ritty, well-acted adventure brimming with turbulent emotions."
