= Arike (film) =

- Film poster
- Directed by: Shyamaprasad
- Screenplay by: Shyamaprasad
- Story by: Sunil Gangopadhyay
- Produced by: N. B. Vindhyan
- Starring: Dileep; Samvrutha Sunil; Mamta Mohandas; Vineeth; Ajmal Ameer; Sreenath Bhasi; Innocent
- Cinematography: Alagappan N
- Edited by: Vinod Sukumaran
- Music by: Ouseppachan
- Production company: Picture Perfect
- Release date: 18 May 2012
- Country: India
- Language: Malayalam

Arike (So Close) is a 2012 Indian Malayalam romantic drama film by Shyamaprasad, starring Dileep, Samvrutha Sunil, Mamta Mohandas, Vineeth, Ajmal Ameer and Sreenath Bhasi in Supporting roles. Based on a Bengali short story by Sunil Gangopadhyay, the movie was produced under the banner of Picture Perfect and has a script by Shyamaprasad, cinematography by Alagappan, editing by Vinod Sukumaran, and music by Ouseppachan.

The film, a romantic drama, is about the shades of love that vary in a relationship woven around three individuals.

== Plot ==
Kalpana's parents are against her marrying Shanthanu, and they try to bring proposals from their own (Brahmin) community. At one point, Kalpana's aunt tricks her into meeting a guy, Sanjay, whom they hope Kalpana will like and marry. While they travel with Sanjay in his car, they meet with an accident, causing some scars on Kalpana's face and giving her a disfigured toe. After the accident, Kalpana backs out from the relationship with Shanthanu and gives in to her parents' wishes to marry Sanjay. Anuradha feels bad for Shanthanu and tries to console him. It is then that Shanthanu realizes that Kalpana has actually not loved him at all. Though his actual love was near him, so close, he failed to recognise it (this is where the name of this film gets significance).

== Cast ==
- Dileep as Shanthanu, Kalpana's ex Love Interest
- Samvrutha Sunil as Kalpana
- Mamta Mohandas as Anuradha
- Vineeth as Balu, Anuradha's Love Interest
- Ajmal Ameer as Sanjay Shenoy, Kalpana's Husband
- Sreenath Bhasi as Anjan, Anuradha's friend, drug marcater
- Urmila Unni as Alaga Devi, Kalpana's mother
- Innocent as Ananthanarayana Pai, Kalpana's father
- Madampu Kunjukuttan as Guruji
- Dinesh Panicker as Subramanya Pai
- Valsala Menon as Balu's mother
- Chithra Iyer as Sujatha
- Prakash Bare as Vinayan
- Chandramohan as Anuradha's father
- Kozhikode Narayanan Nair as Krishnankutty, Balu's father

== Production ==
=== Adaptation ===
Shyamaprasad has adapted several classics on celluloid so far. Arike is the latest in that list and is based on a Bengali short story by Sunil Gangopadhyay, whose novel was also the base for the director's Ore Kadal. Says the director, "I don't think adapting stories from other languages is an issue at all, because human emotions are universal and can be told without linguistic barriers. I am fond of adapting literature, since writing a story is not my forte and I do not believe in concocting a story for the sake of filmmaking." He also adds that Basu Chatterjee, a Bollywood director who portrayed the middle-class in many films, proved to be his guiding force while making Arike.

=== Themes ===
Like all of Shyamaprasad's previous films, Arike too is about the quest for love. Talking about the theme of Arike, the director says, "There is an obsessive quest for love in each one of us. We have illusions and inhibitions about love, yet we have an irrepressible thirst for it. We all want to find happiness in love. But whether we get that happiness is the question which I want to delve through this film."

Compared to the dark themes he took up earlier, Arike's tone is relatively lighter. Shyamaprasad says, "In Ore Kadal, the subject had a shadow of gloom and depression, Ritu was about the aspirations and attitude of the young working population. Arike has a breezy feel, and the story is told in a lighthearted and realistic way. I have also taken efforts to avoid cliches such as rain, sea, train that are common motifs in romantic films."

=== Casting and filming ===
The film has only a handful of characters. Shyamaprasad wanted to use live sound recording and hence, chose actors who could emote dialogues perfectly while shooting itself. Shyamaprasad says he selected Dileep to play the protagonist because he feels the actor has the look and feel of the character. This is the first time Shyamaprasad has cast Dileep in a lead role, though the actor had earlier done a role in the director's 1998 film Kallu Kondoru Pennu. The film's production started in late November 2011. The director had given all the actors a copy of the script so that they could practice their parts well.

The film uses sync sound recording or live sound recording. Shyamaprasad brought in Sohel Sanwari from Bollywood to record the sound.

The film was shot completely from Kozhikode. It was Shyamaprasad's first film to be filmed in the city. He says it was his emotional relationship with the city and its calm nature which helped live recording to a great extent, that inspired him to choose Kozhikode as the main locale. Filming was completed in late December 2011. Cinematographer Alagappan says he experimented a lot with the film, and the film was made in a special "visual tone." It was shot using a Sony F3 Camera. Sakhi Thomas, who worked with Shyamaprasad in Ritu and Elektra, was the costume designer for this film.

== Soundtrack ==
Arike

Soundtrack album by Ouseppachan
- Released: 11 June 2012
- Genre: Feature film soundtrack
- Length: 56:32 (inc. Karaoke)
- Label: Universal Music International

Ouseppachan chronology
Thiruvambadi Thamban (2012)	Arike (2012)	Kalikalam (2012)

All lyrics are written by Shibu Chakravarthy; all music is composed by Ouseppachan.

No.	Title	Artist(s)	Length
1.	"Varavayi Thozhi Vadhuvayi"	Nithyasree Mahadevan	5:15
2.	"Shyam Hare"	Shweta Mohan	6:19
3.	"Iravil Viriyum"	Mamta Mohandas	5:19
4.	"Veyil Pole"	Karthik	4:38
5.	"Ee Vazhiyil"	Sreenivas, Manjari	6:45

== Awards and nominations ==
Filmfare Awards South

- Nominated-Filmfare Award for Best Actress - Malayalam-Mamta Mohandas

Asianet Film Awards

- Asianet Most Popular Actress Award - Mamta Mohandas
