= Chandini Sreedharan =

Indian film actress

- Occupation: Actress
- Years active: 2013–present

Chandini Sreedharan is an Indian actress who appears mainly in Malayalam films, along with a few Tamil, Telugu and Kannada films. She made her acting debut with the 2013 Tamil film Ainthu Ainthu Ainthu. She's notable for her Malayalam films such as KL 10 Patthu (2015), Darvinte Parinamam (2016) and Comrade in America (2017).

== Career ==
In 2013, Chandini Sreedharan debuted with the Tamil movie Ainthu Ainthu Ainthu, directed by Sasi. She played the female lead opposite Bharath. She was known as Mrithika in the film credits. Her second movie was in Telugu, Chakkiligintha, directed by Vema Reddy. She played the female lead opposite Sumanth Ashwin. She was credited as Rehhana in this film.

Her third movie was in Malayalam, KL 10 Patthu, directed by Muhsin Parari. She played the female lead opposite Unni Mukundan. This time she used her real name, and plans to do the same in all industries in the future. Then she acted in the Malayalam movie Darvinte Parinamam directed by Jijo Antony. She played the female lead opposite Prithviraj.

== Filmography ==
Year	Film	Role	Language	Notes
2013	Ainthu Ainthu Ainthu	Liyana & Paayal	Tamil	credited as Mrithika; dual role
2014	Chakkiligintha	Avanthika	Telugu	credited as Rehhana
2015	KL 10 Patthu	Shadiya Mansoor & Nadiya Mansoor	Malayalam	dual role
2016	Darvinte Parinamam	Amala	Malayalam	
2017	Srikanta	Shashi	Kannada	
2017	Comrade In America	Pallavi	Malayalam	
2019	Allu Ramendran	Viji	Malayalam	
2024	Uyir Thamizhukku	Thamizhselvi	Tamil	
2024	Pani	ACP Kalyani Prakash	Malayalam	
2025	Pravinkoodu Shappu	Merinda	Malayalam	
