= Uyir Thamizhukku =

2024 Indian film

- Theatrical release poster
- Directed by: Adham Bava
- Written by: Ajayan Bala; Bala Murali Varman
- Produced by: Adham Bava
- Starring: Ameer Sultan; Imman Annachi; Chandini Sreedharan
- Cinematography: Devaraj
- Edited by: Ashok Charles
- Music by: Vidyasagar
- Production companies: Moon Pictures; V. Creations
- Release date: 10 May 2024 (India)
- Country: India
- Language: Tamil

Uyir Thamizhukku (transl. Long live Tamil) is a 2024 Tamil-language political drama film written by Ajayan Bala and Murali Varman, and directed by Adham Bava. The film was produced by Adam Bhava, under the banner of Moon Pictures and V. Creations, It features Ameer Sultan, Imman Annachi, and Chandini Sreedharan as lead roles, while Anandaraj, Saravana Sakthi, Subramaniam Siva, and Mahanadhi Shankar play supporting roles

The music was composed by Vidyasagar with cinematography by Devaraj and editing handled by Ashok Charles. Uyir Thamizhukku was theatrically released on 10 May 2024 to negative reviews from critics.

== Plot ==
Pazhakadai Ramachandran, a minister gets murdered mysteriously in his house. ACP Rajarajan is investigating the case, but he finds a lot of loopholes here. Similarly MGR Pandian, a struggling politician wants to be a minister at any cost,often taking bribes from everyone to achieve his dream. However his life takes a turn when he is accused of killing Pazhakadai Ramachandran, who killed Pazhakadai Ramachandran, how does Pandian prove his innocence to the people forms the basic premise.

== Cast ==
- Ameer Sultan as MGR Pandian
- Imman Annachi
- Chandini Sreedharan as Thamizhselvi
- Anandaraj as Pazhakadai Ramachandran
- G. Marimuthu
- Raj Kapoor
- Saravana Sakthi
- Subramaniam Siva
- Ravi Venkatraman
- Mahanadi Shankar
- Rajasimman
- Arjunan

== Release ==
Uyir Thamizhukku was theatrically released on 10 May 2024.

== Reception ==
Abhinav Subramanian of The Times of India rated the film 2 stars out of 5 stars and noted "Uyir Tamizhukku offers fleeting amusement within an otherwise ineffective film."

Manigandan KR of Times Now rated the film 2.5 stars out of 5 stars and noted "Uyir Thamizhukku might not be an exceptional political thriller. But it certainly isn't boring and is easily a one-time watch."

Akshay Kumar of Cinema Express rated the film 1.5 stars out of 5 stars and noted "The film easily joins the dubious list of films where you rummage for at least one redeeming aspect to no avail." Pacchi Ovarian of ABP Nadu rated this film 2.25 stars out of 5 stars and noted "Those who think the film needs to be seen patiently and a different political picture can go generously to the theaters!"
