= Mayookham =

- Directed by: T. Hariharan
- Written by: T. Hariharan
- Starring: Saiju Kurup; Mamta Mohandas
- Cinematography: Ramachandra Babu
- Edited by: B. Lenin, V. T. Vijayan
- Music by: Bombay Ravi
- Release date: 11 November 2005
- Country: India
- Language: Malayalam

Mayookham is a 2005 Malayalam film directed by T. Hariharan. It stars Saiju Kurup and Mamta Mohandas in the lead roles. It was their debut movie and also the last Malayalam film for late Sujatha Menon.

== Plot ==
Unni Kesavan and Indira are childhood friends. Indira goes to the US with her father, a doctor, and comes back after several years to their family house. She meets Unni and is shocked to see him as a rebel, which contrasts his Brahminic upbringing. She tries to help him by supporting and giving him a new lease of life and slowly love blossoms between the two. Indira becomes the light in Unni's life and she motivates him to turn responsible. But fate plays dirty as Indira is terminally ill and goes back for treatment.

== Cast ==
- Saiju Kurup as Unni Kesavan
- Mamta Mohandas as Indira Balakrishnan
- Sai Kumar as Dr. Balakrishnan, Indira's father
- Nedumudi Venu as Keshavan Namboothiri, Unni's Father
- Vandana Menon as Nalini
- Mithra Kurian as Lathika, Unni's Sister
- Sreejith Ravi as Damu, Unni's Friend
- Vishal Menon as Chandu, Unni's friend
- Vineeth
- Roshan Bijili
- Jawad Hassan
- Jagathy Sreekumar as Raghu
- Kalabhavan Mani as Jayakrishnan
- Indrans as Mohanan
- Babu Namboothiri as Swaminathan
- Thilakan
- Jagannadhan
- Ridhya
- Sreedevi Unni
- Sujatha as Devaki
- Aparna Nair
- Althara
- Girija Surendran

== Soundtrack ==
The soundtrack of this movie was composed by Bombay Ravi to the lyrics written by Mankombu Gopalakrishnan and T. Hariharan. This was the last Malayalam movie to be composed by Bombay Ravi.

#	Title	Singer(s)	Other notes(s)	Raga(s)
1	"Bhagavathikkaavil"	M. G. Sreekumar	Lyrics: Mankombu Gopalakrishnan	Mohanam
2	"Chuvarillaathe"	P. Jayachandran	Lyrics: T. Hariharan	Mohanam
3	"Kaattinu Sugandham"	K. J. Yesudas	Lyrics: Mankombu Gopalakrishnan	Hindolam
4	"Ee Puzhayum"	K. S. Chitra	Lyrics: Mankombu Gopalakrishnan	Udayaravichandrika
5	"Ee Puzhayum"	Chandrashekhar	Lyrics: Mankombu Gopalakrishnan	Udayaravichandrika
6	"Dhanumaasappulari"	Sujatha Mohan	Lyrics: T. Hariharan	Aarabhi
7	"Tha Geha Krithya"	Vijitha	Lyrics: Traditional Taken from Narayaneeyam	Mohanam
