= Hannah Reji Koshy =

Indian actress and model

- Born: Kochi, Kerala, India
- Occupations: Actress; model; dentist
- Years active: 2016–present
- Notable work: Miss Diva - 2018 (Top 5)

Hannah Reji Koshy is an Indian actress and model from Kerala. She made her acting debut in 2016 with the Malayalam film Darvinte Parinamam. She was one of the Top 6 finalists of Miss India South, an Indian associated Beauty pageant. She also competed in Miss Diva, Miss Universe India 2018 and finished as a Top 5 finalist.

== Early life ==
Hannah Reji Koshy hails from Kochi, Ernakulam. Apart from her acting career, she is a professional model who created her appearance in various beauty pageants. Hannah completed her schooling from Assisi Vidyaniketan and graduated from Sharavathi Dental College from Karnataka. She was also seen essaying the main role in a video titled Living Nirbhaya which was released on 8 March (International Women's Day). Koshy is a dentist.

== Career ==
=== Films ===
Hannah made her debut in the Malayalam film industry in 2016 through the film Darvinte Parinamam directed by Jijo Antony. She portrayed the role of Ancy, a simple and traditional girl carrying the supporting role in the film, co-starring Prithviraj Sukumaran. The film released on 18 March 2016. The following year she starred in Rakshadhikari Baiju Oppu, in which she played the wife of title character Baiju played by Biju Menon. The film won Kerala State Film Award for Best Film with Popular Appeal and Aesthetic Value. Her performance in the film Kooman earned her the Kerala Film Critics Association Award for Best Supporting Actress for the year 2022.

=== Modelling ===
Hannah competed in Miss South India and was one of the Top 6 Finalist. She later on competed in Miss Diva - 2018 which is the sister pageant of Femina Miss India. The Winner of Miss Diva will represent India at World's Biggest beauty pageant Miss Universe. She was one of the Top 5 finalist at Miss Diva - 2018.

- Miss Beautiful Skin – Miss Queen Of India 2015
- Miss Moksha 2012
- Miss Personality – Manappuram Miss South India 2015
- Miss Cat Walk – Femina Miss Kerala
- Miss Diva - 2018 – Miss Congeniality

== Filmography ==
Key
†	Denotes films that have not yet been released

*All films are in Malayalam language unless otherwise noted.

Year	Title	Role	Notes
2016	Darvinte Parinamam	Ancy	
2017	Rakshadhikari Baiju Oppu	Ajitha	
2017	Pokkiri Simon	Mariamma	Cameo appearance
2018	Ente Mezhuthiri Athazhangal	Thara Antony	
2022	Theerppu	Prabha Nair	
2022	Kooman	Lakshmi	Kerala Film Critics Association Award for Best Supporting Actress
2023	Corona Papers	Rani	
2023	A Ranjith Cinema	Priya	
2024	DNA	RJ Hanna	
2025	Oru Ronaldo Chithram	Ligina	
2025	Mirage	Rithika	
2026	Faces	Nitya	
