= Kammara Sambhavam =

- Poster
- Directed by: Rathish Ambat
- Written by: Murali Gopy
- Produced by: Gokulam Gopalan
- Starring: Dileep; Siddharth; Bobby Simha; Namitha Pramod; Murali Gopy; Shwetha Menon
- Narrated by: Suraj Venjaramoodu
- Cinematography: Sunil K. S.
- Edited by: Suresh Urs
- Music by: Gopi Sundar
- Production company: Sree Gokulam Movies
- Distributed by: Grand Production; Kalasangham Films
- Release date: 14 April 2018
- Running time: 182 minutes
- Country: India
- Language: Malayalam

Kammara Sambhavam (transl. Kammaran, The Incident) is a 2018 Indian Malayalam-language epic historical fiction satirical action drama film written by Murali Gopy and directed by Rathish Ambat (in his directorial debut). The film was produced by Gokulam Gopalan. The film stars Dileep as the titular antagonist alongside an ensemble cast of Siddharth, Bobby Simha, Namitha Pramod, Murali Gopi, Shwetha Menon, Manikuttan, Vijayaraghavan, Vinay Forrt and Siddique in supporting roles.

Kammara Sambhavam marks the Malayalam film debut of Siddharth. Principal photography began on 18 August 2016 in Kochi. The film was released in India on 14 April 2018. Despite receiving positive reviews, the film underperformed at the box office but it has a cult following. The film won the National Film Award for Best Production Design.

== Plot ==
A group of liquor barons, who are members of the Indian Liberation Party (ILP), want the declining party to win the upcoming Kerala state election to benefit their business interests. To raise the ILP's image, they decide to make a biopic about Kammaran Nambiar, the party patriarch and the last veteran of the Indian independence movement. They ask director Pulikeshi to make a film based on a chapter in the book Unsung Heroes of India by Robert S. Coogan, in which Kammaran is depicted as a forgotten freedom fighter.

Pulikeshi meets Kammaran, now an ailing old man living in an old house with his son, Bose. Kammaran tells the story: During World War II, Kammaran was a cunning and selfish medical practitioner in Amritasamudram, who would do anything for personal gain. He gains the trust of Robert S. Coogan and cruel landlord Kelu Nambiar, for his personal gain. He also have crush on Kelu Nambiar's niece Bhanumathi. To destroy his love rival, Kelu Nambiar's son and Bhanumathi's cousin brother Othenan, Kammaran incites violence between the villagers, Othenan, Othenan's militants, Kelu Nambiar, the rebels of Amritasamudram and British officers. During the violence, Kammaran kills Kelu Nambiar, and Othenan is arrested. Later, Othenan visits Kammaran in the night, but as Kammaran tells the story he begins coughing and is unable to continue.

Pulikeshi makes the film as the ILP instructed, and when Kammaran watches it he realizes the roles have been reversed. Pulikeshi cast actor Dileep as Kammaran, the protagonist in the film. In it, Othenan and his friend Satnam are working for the British. They are captured as traitors by Netaji (Subhas Chandra Bose) but they escape, and Othenan kills the man who reported their treason. Kelu Nambiar is shown as a compassionate landlord, who supports the poor workers. However, Kelu Nambiar's wife, Maheshwari, is shown inflicting cruelty and torturing the poor workers. When Kammaran arrives, who is shown as the leader of the ILP, prevents the harassment towards the poor workers and gains a massive support from the workers, and Maheshwari is forced to flee. Kammaran is shown doing many things for the benefit of the villagers, such as looting money from the British to distribute it amongst the villagers. Bhanumathi is shown as Kammaran's wife. Othenan returns and plots with Maheshwari and the British against Kammaran. The plot involves the use of Netaji's death to gain Kammaran's trust so that they can then blame Kammaran for the planned assassination of Mahatma Gandhi.

Kammaran then tells the story of how he met Netaji. During the Battle of Imphal in 1944, Kammaran saved Netaji who was injured by a grenade. Netaji found such confidence in Kammaran that he asked him to form a party for the people. As a strong symbol, Kammaran took the axe, the weapon Maheshwari's men used to murder his father, on which he swore revenge against India's landlord system. He returns to Amrutha Samudram and forms the ILP.

To foil the assassination plot, Kammaran posts his men in three places along Gandhi's procession route to a temple, while he rides on a train with Gandhi. Othenan secretly boards the train and moves against Gandhi, but Surendran has warned Kammaran that Othenan is a traitor. Kammaran stops and chases Othenan to the top of the train. After a lengthy and hardcore fist fight, Kammaran kills Othenan using his axe. Kammaran stands to be hanged for killing a British officer. The only person who believes his story is Robert S. Coogan, who convinces Jawaharlal Nehru to free him. The film ends with Kammaran refusing his followers' request to participate in elections, but promising to be back when he is needed.

The film becomes a success and helps the ILP return to power. Elderly Kammaran is made the Chief Minister of Kerala. Pulikesi arrives and asks him what really happened to Othenan. It is then shown that years later Othenan came for Bhanumathi, who was then Kammaran's wife, and Kammaran killed him brutally by stabbing him several times and crushing him in an oilseed press, but doesn't reveal this to Pulikeshi. Kammaran tells Pulikeshi that the movie is now history in everybody's mind and that actual events no longer matter.

== Cast ==
- Dileep in dual roles as:
  - Kammaran Nambiar, the villanous protagonist
    - Master Ajaz as young Kammaran
  - Himself
- Siddharth in a Dual role as:
  - Othenan Nambiar
  - Himself
- Murali Gopy in dual role as
  - Kelu Nambiar
  - Himself
- Namitha Pramod in dual role as :
  - Bhanumathi
  - Herself
- Bobby Simha as Director Pulikeshi
- Shweta Menon as Malayil Maheshwari / Herself
- Manikuttan in dual role as
  - Thilakan Purushothamman
  - Himself
- Kenny Basumatary as Netaji Subhas Chandra Bose
- Vijayaraghavan as Francis
- Siddique as Bose Kammaran
- Nedumudi Venu as Selvan Mooppeennu
- Indrans as Surendran
- Vinay Forrt as Chandrabanu
- Sudheer Karamana as Rajappan
- Baiju as Siju Dineshan
- Divya Prabha in dual role as :
  - Kamala Nambiar
  - Herself
- Santhosh Keezhattoor in dual role as :
  - Viswambharan Nambiar, Kammaran's and Kamala's Father
  - Himself
- Anjali Nair as Kammaran's and Kamala's Mother
- Andy Von Eich as Robert S Coogan
- Simarjeet Singh Nagra as Satnam Singh (Othenan's friend) / Himself
- Paul Reardon as Merchiston
- Murugan as Murugeshan
- Babu Annur as Pattar
- Samuthirakani as Kunjaambu, Bhanumathi's Father (uncredited portrait appearance)
- Vanitha as Gomathi
- Kanchanamma as Grandmother
- Arun as KP. Manukumar
- Prathapan as Maruthu
- Sonia as Irene Coogan
- Sona Nair as Deepa Bose's wife
- Major Kishore as Himanshu
- Surendra Rajan as Mahathma Gandhi
- Sourabh Dubey as Jawaharlal Nehru
- Lal Jose as himself

=== Family tree ===
Dotted lines indicate a love relationship between characters, and dashed lines indicate marriage relationship between characters.

Malayil Family
Kammaran's Family

Malayilamma
Kelu Nambiar	Maheswari	Gomathi	Kunjaambu	Viswambharan Nambiar	Kunjilakshmi
Othenan Nambiar	Bhanumathi	Kammaran Nambiar	Kamala Nambiar	Thilakan
Bose Kammaran	Deepa Bose

== Production ==
Kammara Sambhavam is the feature film directorial debut of prolific advertisement filmmaker Rathish Ambat. The plot follows the adventures of Kammaran, the character played by Dileep. According to Ambat, "We can't limit the movie to any specific genre", it has politics, contemporary relevance, history and elements of a thriller. He describes the film as "a satire that has politics, history, and cinema". Murali Gopi worked on the script for nearly two years. He describes the film as a satire that crisscross period, pop, and black comedy. Sidharth makes his Malayalam film debut with the film. Namitha Pramod plays the female lead.

Principal photography began on 18 August 2016 in Kochi. The production was unexpectedly stalled while it was filmed in Theni, Tamil Nadu, during July 2017 because of Dileep's arrest. After a break, the filming resumed on 9 October 2017 in Vengara, Malappuram district; Dileep rejoined the film on 20 October in Malayattoor, Ernakulam district. There was a schedule in Chennai which completed before December 2017, after which one schedule was remaining to be shot in Theni. By the time it stalled production in July, the film had already spend ₹10 crore (100 million rupees) on budget. It was completed on a total budget of ₹20 crore.

== Soundtrack ==
The film's original songs were composed by Gopi Sundar.

No.	Title	Lyrics	Singer(s)	Length
1.	"Njano Ravo"	Rafeeq Ahamed	Haricharan Sheshadri, Divya S. Menon	5:12
2.	"Azhikkullil"	B. K. Harinarayanan	Karthik, Divya S. Menon	4:55
3.	"Anjandu Bharikkan"	Anil Panachooran	Murali Gopy	4:11
