= Meppadiyan =

2022 Indian drama thriller film

- Theatrical poster
- Directed by: Vishnu Mohan
- Written by: Vishnu Mohan
- Produced by: Unni Mukundan
- Starring: Unni Mukundan; Anju Kurian; Saiju Kurup
- Cinematography: Neil D'Cunha
- Edited by: Shameer Muhammed
- Music by: Rahul Subrahmanian
- Production company: Unni Mukundan Films
- Distributed by: Goodwill Entertainments
- Release date: 14 January 2022 (India)
- Running time: 124 minutes
- Country: India
- Language: Malayalam

Meppadiyan (transl. Above-mentioned) is a 2022 Indian Malayalam-language action thriller film written and directed by Vishnu Mohan and produced by Unni Mukundan Films. The film stars Unni Mukundan, Anju Kurian, Kottayam Ramesh, Saiju Kurup, Aju Varghese, Nisha Sarang and Kalabhavan Shajohn.

The songs and background score for the film was composed by Rahul Subrahmanian. Filming took place in Aruvithura and Poonjar in late 2020. The film released on 14 January 2022 to mixed to positive reviews. At the 69th National Film Awards 2019, the film won the Best First Film of a Director trophy. This film is noted as the last film appearance of actor Kundara Johny, who died in 2023.

== Plot ==
Jayakrishnan is a mechanic who runs an automobile workshop in a small village in Kerala. He is a simple, honest, and kind-hearted man who is deeply rooted in his values. He lives a modest life, taking care of his family, and is respected by the people around him.

Jayakrishnan is not an ambitious businessman; he only wishes to lead a peaceful life. However, like any middle-class man, he aspires for financial stability and a better future. He is religious and relies on faith to guide him through life's struggles.

== Cast ==
- Unni Mukundan as Jayakrishnan
- Anju Kurian as Renuka, Jayakrishnan's love interest
- Kottayam Ramesh as Ayyapan Aashaan
- Saiju Kurup as Varkey
- Aju Varghese as Xavier
- Kundara Johny as Jacob
- Nisha Sarang as Stella
- Manohari Joy as Lakshmi
- Jordi Poonjar as Satheesan
- Indrans as Ashraf Hajji
- Sreejith Ravi as Sub Inspector Stephen
- Major Ravi as Adv. Thomas Tharakan
- Kalabhavan Shajohn as Jiby
- Arya as Aannie
- Krishna Prasad
- Pauly Valsan as Annamma
- Shanker Ramakrishnan as Dr. Ashok
- Ravi Mariya as Anbu Raj
- Aparna Janardhanan
- Naveen Illath
- Ansar Subair as Kevin

== Production ==
The film was shot around 48 different locations across Aruvithura and Pala with an ensemble cast. Filming began on 26 October 2020 in Aruvithura.

== Soundtrack ==
The music of the film is composed by Rahul Subrahmanian. All lyrics are written by Joe Paul except Ayyappa Song was written by Vinayak Sasikumar and Niramizhiyode was written by Ajeesh Dasan.

No.	Title	Singer(s)	Length
1.	"Kannil Minnum"	Karthik & Nithya Mammen	03:57
2.	"Mele Vaanil"	Vijay Yesudas	04:20
3.	"Ayyappa Song"	Unni Mukundan	03:05
4.	"Niramizhiyode"	Sooraj Santhosh	04:15

== Release ==
The release of the film was postponed several times due to COVID-19 pandemic in India. The film had a theatrical release on 14 January 2022.

== Critical response ==
The Times of India rated 3.5 out of 5 and said that "The writer-director manages to really drive the tension to a peak with simply showing how our courts and particularly, government servants can make us sweat blood out of pure pettiness and arrogance ... Unni Mukundan is so wow that he is not Unni Mukundan, but Jayakrishnan ... This movie offers not just a glimpse at society, but also good character studies. It is a good film for the family to enjoy and discuss together". Malayala Manorama also rated 3.5 out of 5 and wrote: "Unni Mukundan follows his character with a well-balanced gait and has been able to deliver in total the tribulations ... The makers have been able to pull off a high drama by adopting scenarios of simple and real life events ... It may not be a highly thrilling drama but is nevertheless an engrossing tale that keeps viewers hooked till the credits roll up". The New Indian Express rated 3 out of 5 stars and said that the film is "supposed to be a respite from the action-heavy, macho posturing roles Unni did before, and in that regard, yes, the film lives up to its promise ... It's nice to see an actor like Unni making sincere efforts to change the audience's perception of his acting capabilities".
