= Aa Aiduguru =

- Theatrical release poster
- Directed by: Anil Gurudu
- Produced by: Sarita Patra
- Starring: Kranthi Reddy; Tanishq Reddy; Kranthi Kumar; Shashi; Krishna Teja
- Music by: Anand
- Release date: 4 July 2014
- Country: India
- Language: Telugu

Aa Aidiguru (transl. Those five members) is a 2014 Indian Telugu-language action film directed by Anil Gurudu and starring Kranthi Reddy, Tanishq Reddy, Kranthi Kumar, Shashi and Krishna Teja. The film was released to negative reviews.

== Cast ==
- Kranthi Reddy as John
- Tanishq Reddy as Siddhu
- Kranthi Kumar as Altaf
- Shashi as Balaram
- Krishna Teja as Krish
- Venkat as Thota Chakravarthi
- Asmita Sood as Police Officer
- Nagineedu as Ex-Chief Minister
- Posani Krishna Murali as Krishna Murali
- Babu Mohan
- Fish Venkat
- Vasu as Raghuram

== Production ==
Tanishq Reddy plays a spoilt brat in the film who later decides to become a police officer.

== Soundtrack ==
The music was composed by Mantra Anand.

- "Pum Puhar Mama Pista Bahar" (lyrics by Suddala Ashok Teja)
- "Repo Mapo" - Rahul Sipligunj, Dinakar, Chaitra, Sahithi
- "Edure Ledani"
- "Nee Mayalo"
- "Athade CM"

== Reception ==
A critic from The Times of India wrote that "The story is built on an idea that has a purpose but wastage of quite some screen time could have been avoided if only some forced and crude humour was not part of the script". A critic from The Hindu wrote that "The director likens the five characters in the story to Pandavas, Venkat as Dronacharya and CM Raghuram as Krishna. The characters go about their job mechanically. A little more spark would have brightened up the screen". A critic from India Herald wrote that "Aa Idhuguru is the kind of film it feels bad to say anything negative about, because it so obviously comes from a place of good intentions and sincere efforts. But good intentions on their own, do not make way for a hearty film".
