= Kadha Innuvare =

- Theatrical release poster
- Directed by: Vishnu Mohan
- Written by: Vishnu Mohan
- Based on: C/o Kancharapalem (2018) by Venkatesh Maha
- Produced by: Shameer Muhammed; Vishnu Mohan; Jomon T. John
- Starring: Biju Menon; Nikhila Vimal; Methil Devika
- Cinematography: Jomon T. John
- Edited by: Shameer Muhammed
- Music by: Ashwin Aryan
- Production company: Plan J Studios
- Release date: 20 September 2024
- Country: India
- Language: Malayalam

Kadha Innuvare (transl. The story so far) is a 2024 Indian Malayalam-language comedy-drama film written and directed by Vishnu Mohan. A remake of the Telugu film C/o Kancharapalem (2018), the film stars Biju Menon, Anusree, Nikhila Vimal, Methil Devika and Siddique in the lead roles.

== Plot ==
An anthology of four unusual stories where each couple fights to be with the ones they love against all odds.

Ramachandran is a peon at a Kerala Government office in Thiruvananthapuram. Lekshmi is a new engineer who is transferred to his office. A warm friendship blossoms between Ramachandran and Lekshmi, despite their class and educational difference. Ramu is a poor schoolboy in a remote Palakkadan village harbouring an untold love towards his classmate Janaki. Joseph is a firebrand young political worker in Alappuzha who meets and has a hate-turned-to-love relationship with bold college girl Uma. An unnamed man is a good-natured BEVCO employee in Idukki who harbours untold love towards a purdah-clad woman Nazeema who visits his shop daily. Where fate takes these four loverboys and their ladyloves, is the plot of the movie.

== Cast ==
- Biju Menon as Ramachandran
- Nikhila Vimal as Uma
- Anusree as Nazeema
- Methil Devika as M.S Lekshmi
- Anu Mohan as Joseph
- Hakim Shahjahan
- Sreerang Shine as Ramu
- Devika Anoop as Janaki
- Noila Francy as Aditi, Lekshmi's daughter
- Siddique as Palipattu Narayanan, Uma's father
- Kottayam Ramesh
- Renji Panicker as Sakhavu Sivaprasad alias Sivettan
- Appunni Sasi
- Krishna Prasad
- Jordi Poonjar
- Krishnan Balakrishnan
- Hari Pathanapuram
- Murali Mohan
- Kalesh Kalakkodu
- Kishor Satya as Mahesh, Lekshmi's brother

== Release ==
The film was released in theatres on 20 September 2024.

== Reception ==
Vivek Santhosh of The New Indian Express rated the film two and half out of five stars and noted "Kadha Innuvare remains an enduring film over the course of two hours, largely due to its eye-catching cinematography and the charm of the lead pair, Biju and Devika."
