= Tanishq Reddy =

Indian Film Actor

- Born: Pogula Veeratanishka Kumar Reddy; 14-02-1987; Hyderabad, Telangana, India
- Occupation: Film Actor
- Years active: 2011– Present
- Relatives: Serin George

Tanishq Reddy is an Indian film actor who works in Telugu-language films.

== Career ==
Tanishq Reddy studied from hyderabad public school later went to st.marys college himayat nagar and yusufguda and later went to deccan medical college and in career was inspired by Chiranjeevi to join acting. After taking classes from Kishore Namit Kapoor's acting school, Shiamak Davar's dance institute and martial arts (Kalaraipayattu, Muay Thai, and Taekwondo) and losing 45 kilograms. He noted that Allu Arjun advised him to improve his dancing at his Film Nagar shed and that Allu Sirish and Allu Bobby helped him initially prior to entering the film industry. Tanishq made his debut with Duniya (2011) in a supporting role. He made his starred in the ensemble film Aa Aiduguru (2014) and worked on Sukumar and Allu Arjun's short film I Am That Change later that same year.

He worked as an associate director for the films and also played supporting role in Chakkiligintha (2018) during this time. He made his solo lead debut with Sakala Kala Vallabhudu (2019). His recent movie was Darpanam (2019), in which he plays a ghostbuster. In 2020, he started the Needy Desk initiative.

== Filmography ==
Year	Title	Role	Notes	Ref.
2011	Duniya			
2014	Aa Aiduguru	Siddhu		
2014	I Am That Change	Rich brat	Short film	
2018	Chakkiligintha	Gautham		
2019	SakalaKala Vallabhudu	Srinu		
2019	Darpanam	Sidhu		
