= Lanka (2006 film) =

2006 film by A. K. Sajan

- Film poster
- Directed by: A. K. Sajan
- Written by: A. K. Sajan
- Produced by: Santhosh Damodharan
- Starring: Suresh Gopi; Mamta Mohandas; Bineesh Kodiyeri
- Cinematography: Shaji Kumar
- Edited by: L. Bhoominathan
- Music by: Sreenivas; Rajesh Jayamohan
- Production company: Dhamor Cinemas
- Distributed by: Dhamor Cinemas Release
- Release date: 3 March 2006 (India)
- Running time: 114 minutes
- Country: India
- Language: Malayalam

Lanka is a 2006 Indian Malayalam-language crime thriller drama film directed by A. K. Sajan. The film stars Suresh Gopi and Mamta Mohandas in the lead roles.

== Plot ==
Sravan is a captain in Indian Navy fighting in Sri Lanka against the Tamil guerillas. He manages to kill hundreds of guerillas in the operations launched by the Indian Peace-Keeping Force (IPKF).

Post-operations, he decides to live in Sri Lanka. Now, he is a womanizer who goes about his task with gusto. He is stinkingly rich and owns a number of palatial bungalows. Sravan has a psychic problem too. He was abandoned by his actress mother, and his wife ran away with her lover. Sravan's daring operations against the Tamil guerillas incur the wrath of the Liberation Tigers of Tamil Eelam (LTTE). They are out to bump him off. Into his life enters Lanka who is a gypsy girl. Sravan rapes her but ends up marrying her unaware of the fact that she is from the LTTE stronghold out to seek revenge on behalf of the Tamils.

Lanka almost succeeds in her plans. Sravan survives the murderous attack on him but is incapacitated and confined to bed. Lanka pretends to nurse him back to health. However, her actual aim is to escape with all his wealth. She manages to poison Sravan and his daughter, Saya. Thinking Sravan is dead, Lanka tries to leave. He manages to grab her and spits the remaining poison into her mouth by kissing her. They both die together as a result with their deaths reported as suicide.

== Cast ==
- Suresh Gopi as Captain Sravan
- Mamta Mohandas as Lanka
- Subair
- Raveendran
- T. P. Madhavan
- Manuraj
- Sargo Vijayan
- Akhila
- Veda Sastry
- Archana Suseelan as Kokila
- Niranjana
- Helen
- Bineesh Kodiyeri as Dr Gunashekharan
