= Guardian (2021 film) =

2021 film by Prof. Satheesh Paul

- Directed by: Prof. Satheesh Paul
- Written by: Prof. Satheesh Paul
- Produced by: Jobin George; Shibu Kuryakose
- Starring: Saiju Kurup; Miya George; Sijoy Varghese; Nayana Elza
- Cinematography: Jobby James
- Edited by: Viji Abraham
- Music by: Pradeep Tom
- Production company: Black Maria Productions
- Release date: 1 January 2021
- Country: India
- Language: Malayalam

Guardian is a 2021 Indian Malayalam-language investigating crime thriller film, directed by Satheesh Paul, which is based on his own script book named Oru Mazhakkalathu, and starring Saiju Kurup and Miya George. Guardian was released on 1 January 2021 on Prime Reels, one of the first four released on the OTT platform.

== Plot ==
Shruthi is the daughter of a well known businessman. She attempts to commit suicide due to love failure and Dr.Arun treats her and they both become good friends. They decide to marry each other. Both of them start to live a happy life when a person blackmails her that he has her intimate pictures. A tensed Shruthi immediately called her ex- boyfriend Kiran claiming that he cheated her all along and he is still trying destroy her happy married life. At first Kiran acted that he did not know anything about the blackmail, but actually he is the person behind the blackmail. Arun noticed the change in the behaviour of Shruthi and soon he found out the reason of Shruthi's moodiness. A concerned Arun decided to protect Shruthi at any cost, and he killed Kiran at his house. Arun assured that to erase all the evidences against him.The rest of the movie revolves around police trying to solve the case.

== Cast ==
- Saiju Kurup as Dr. Arun
- Nayana Elza as Shruthi wife of Dr. Arun
- Miya George as ASP Meera Mohandas IPS
- Sijoy Varghese as SSP Nandakumar IPS
- Shiyas Kareem as Kiran
- Ajay Shibu parakkal as Shanmughan / Vinayakan
- Kishore as DYSP Ramamoorthy
- Ananthu Anil as SI Ananthakrishnan
- Shimna Kamar as Forensic officer
- Hari Menon as Bank manager
- Adv. Shibu Kuriakose as John Samuel
- Dini Daniel as Lali Samuel
- Dr. George Mathew as Psychiatrist
- Leo Tharakan as Traffic SI
- Ann Sabu John as TV Reporter
- Sony Chacko as Forensic Surgeon
- Prof. Sathish Paul as IG of Police
- Krishnajith Gokul as basketball player

== Sound Track ==
- Savaria...
- Najim Arshad, Sruthy Sivadas
- Venmathiye...
- Libin Scaria, SK Keerthana
