= Paisa Paisa (2013 film) =

- Film poster
- Directed by: Prasanth Murali
- Written by: Rajesh Varma; Prashanth Murali
- Produced by: Raj Zacharias
- Starring: Indrajith; Aju Varghese; Mamta Mohandas; Sandhya; Daniel Balaji
- Cinematography: Kishore Mani
- Edited by: Nikhil Venu
- Music by: Songs: Aby Salvin Thomas; Background Score: Rahul Raj
- Production companies: Celebs and Red Carpet
- Distributed by: Celebs and Red Carpet Release
- Release date: 28 June 2013
- Running time: 110 minutes
- Country: India
- Language: Malayalam

Paisa Paisa is a 2013 Indian Malayalam thriller film written and directed by debutante director Prasanth Murali. The film was produced by Raj Zacharias under the banner Celebs and Red Carpet and features Indrajith, Aju Varghese, Mamta Mohandas, Sandhya, and Daniel Balaji in the lead roles. Set against the backdrop of Chennai and Kochi, Paisa Paisa is a multi-narrative realistic thriller showing how money can affect the lives of people. The film released on 28 June 2013. The songs were composed by debutant, Aby Salvin while Rahul Raj composed the background score.

== Plot ==
The story unfolds the events happening in just four hours of a day in two cities - Kochi and Chennai. Balu who goes to Chennai to attend an interview falls into a trap in the few minutes he goes out of the call centre office to make a phone call. He contacts his friend Kishore, an ad filmmaker and his friend, to help him with some money. Kishore, who is in Kochi, has an equally crucial day. His wife Nithya is returning to his life as the couple has been living separately for some time. Kishore sets aside his plans to reconcile with his wife to help his friend. However, he fails to gather enough money to help Balu. How money changes the lives of these characters forms the rest of the story.

== Cast ==
- Indrajith Sukumaran as Kishore
- Aju Varghese as Balu
- Daniel Balaji as Auto driver who kidnap Balu
- Mamta Mohandas as Nithya
- Sandhya as Kumudam, auto driver's wife
- Apoorva Bose as Pooja
- Kishore Satya as Aby Pothen
- Rajeev Rangan as Rajeev
- Anoop Chandran as Venkidesh
- Dileesh Pothan as Omanakuttan
- Dinesh Paniker as Bhaskaran
- Aneesh G Menon as Sandheep
- Sasi Kalinga as Aalikka

== Production ==
Directed by debutante Prasanth Murali, an erstwhile assistant to V. K. Prakash, the script for the flick was jointly penned by the director and Rajesh Varma. Model-turned-actress Amruta Patki featured in the promotional song of this film. The shooting of the film started at Chennai in November 2012.

== Soundtrack ==
Paisa Paisa

Soundtrack album by Aby Salvin Thomas
- Released: 23 June 2013
- Genre: Feature film soundtrack
- Length: 21:49
- Language: Malayalam
- Label: Muzik 247

The soundtrack of Paisa Paisa consists of seven songs, out of which six were composed by Aby Salvin Thomas while the theme song was composed by Rahul Raj. D. Santhosh wrote the lyrics of all the songs.

Tracklist
No.	Title	Singer(s)	Length
1.	"Iravino Pagalino"	Vineeth Sreenivasan	03:45
2.	"Karaleriyumbol"	Namitha Correya & Carl Frenies	02:03
3.	"Neeyo Kaatto" (Female Version)	Bhavya Lakshmi	03:35
4.	"Neeyo Kaatto" (Karaoke Version)		03:33
5.	"Neeyo Kaatto" (Male Version)	Vijay Yesudas	03:33
6.	"Paisa Paisa"	Namitha Correya & Carl Frenies	02:59
7.	"Paisa Paisa" (Theme Music by Rahul Raj)		02:22
Total length:			21:49

== Critical reception ==
The Times of India gave the film a rating of 2.5 out of 5 saying that, "Paisa Paisa loses its pace for want of engaging twists and a taut narrative and easily turns into a flick that passes by without a flutter." Paresh C Palicha of Rediff gave the film a rating of 2 out of 5 and said that, "Paisa Paisa has a promising premise to build on, but turns out to be a disappointment."
