= Theerppu =

- Theatrical release poster
- Directed by: Rathish Ambat
- Written by: Murali Gopy
- Produced by: Vijay Babu; Rathish Ambat; Murali Gopy
- Starring: Prithviraj Sukumaran; Vijay Babu; Saiju Kurup; Indrajith Sukumaran; Isha Talwar; Hannah Reji Koshy
- Cinematography: Sunil K. S.
- Edited by: Deepu S. Joseph
- Music by: Songs: Murali Gopy; Score: Gopi Sundar
- Production companies: Friday Film House; Celluloid Maarg
- Distributed by: Friday Film House
- Release date: 25 August 2022
- Running time: 147 minutes
- Country: India
- Language: Malayalam

Theerppu (transl. Judgment) is a 2022 Malayalam-language action drama film directed by Rathish Ambat and written by Murali Gopy.The film is produced by Vijay Babu, Rathish Ambat and Murali Gopy under Friday Film House and Celluloid Maarg. It stars an ensemble cast including Prithviraj Sukumaran, Vijay Babu, Indrajith Sukumaran, Isha Talwar, Saiju Kurup, Hannah Reji Koshy, Suzanne Bernert, Alencier Ley Lopez, Srikant Murali and Siddique.

Theerppu was released theatrically on 25 August 2022 and received negative reviews from critics. The film was a box office bomb.

== Plot ==
Four friends: Abdullah Marakkar, Ram Kumar Nair, Kalyan Menon, and Parameshwaran Potti share a traumatic past. Their fathers were friends and were embroiled in a property dispute.

1993: Adv. Menon, Kalyan's father, invited Ram's father and Potti's father to get into a deal with a French woman, who was interested in buying a 400-year-old 8-acre property along the shore owned by Sahib Marakkar. The illiterate Sahib is betrayed by his friends and they transfer the property to the French woman, making a lump sum. In turn, the French woman established a hotel there. Unable to digest the fact that his friends betrayed him and the ancestral property lost, Sahib committed suicide, which brought his family to the streets. Abdullah remained traumatized for the rest of his life and decided to avenge his father's death.

Present: The hotel is now being managed by Ram and his wife Mythili. Parameshwaran, who incurred huge losses in his business, visits Ram, now the prominent businessman in the area. Ram is still that arrogant, selfish and womanizing person, who maintains a tough relationship with his wife Mythili was in the hotel which he built after partnering with the French Chain of luxury hotels. Parameshwaran discovers that Ram and prabha has an illicit affair and he hates it. He also learns about the traumatized Abdullah and opens the way for him to enter the hotel. Abdullah starts to play mind games with Ram. An agitated Ram calls Kalyan, who is now a DIG, to the hotel.

Abdullah makes a move on Ram, who accidentally kills him, hence committing a murder and losing peace once and for all. This was the judgement or theerppu, given by Abdullah.

== Cast ==
- Prithviraj Sukumaran as Abdullah Marakkar
  - Gowrishankar as Young Abdullah
- Indrajith Sukumaran as DIG Kalyan Menon IPS
  - Ananthakrishnan as Young Kalyan
- Saiju Kurup as Parameshwaran Potti
  - Amar Alexander as Young Potti
- Vijay Babu as Ram Kumar Nair
  - Madhav as Young Ram
- Isha Talwar as Mythili Ram Kumar
- Hannah Reji Koshy as Prabha Nair
- Suzanne Bernert as Anastasia Aubert
- Siddique as Basheer Marakkar, Abdullah's father
- Sreelakshmi as Beewathu, Abdullah's mother
- Srikant Murali as Vikraman Nair, Ram Kumar's father
- Mammukoya as Musaliyar
- Redin Kingsley as Selva
- Lukman Avaran as Chandrabhanu
- Shaju Sreedhar as Menon, Kalyan's father
- Alencier Ley Lopez as Chandran Pilla aka Pillaji
- Sudev Nair as Narayanan
- Aswin Kumar as the Commissioner
- VK Prakash as DGP Mathew Jacob
- Poojappura Radhakrishnan as the Village Officer
- Shamim Rayeen as Pavan Putra Bhede
- Vinod Vaswani as Lakshman Kothadia

=== Voice cast ===
- Mamta Mohandas as Dr. Shwetha Pradeep
- Manikandan Pattambi as a police officer
- Manikuttan as Blade Thambi

== Release ==
=== Theatrical ===
The film released in theatres on 25 August 2022.

=== Home media ===
The digital rights for the film were acquired by Disney+ Hotstar and began streaming from 30 September 2022.

== Reception ==
Anna M. M. Vetticad of Firstpost rated the film 1.5 out of 5 stars. She heavily criticised how politically cautious it was and stated, “Shafi and Vivek naturally arresting personalities cannot compensate for Theerppu's ridiculously facile politics.” Manoj Kumar R of The Indian Express gave the movie 2/5 rating and commented that "the film seemingly has no inkling of how absolute power works". Lakshmi Priya of The News Minute rated the film with 2.5/5 stars, stating "the film can be read as a commentary on revisionist history and political appropriation with a lot to offer ‘between’ the lines, but the lines themselves have little solid to offer". S.R.Praveen of The Hindu said "Theerppu comes perilously close to living up to that joke that some films are made quickly within the limited space of a room or a resort, and having no content worth speaking about". V Vinod Nair of The Times of India stated "the movie fails to make the impact we expect, with the first half is just about watchable and the second half lags too much", but rated the film with 3/5 stars. A reviewer of Onmanorama called it "a serious drama trivialised by confused mix of theatrics".
