= Thala (2021 film) =

Malayalam film

- Directed by: Khais Millen
- Written by: Khais Millen
- Produced by: Khais Millen; Roshan Mahamood; Soji Khais; Nihal Abdulkhader
- Starring: Surabhi Lakshmi; Binoy Antony; Shaalin Zoya; Murugan Martin; Jinu Kuttikkatt; Sreevidya Mullachery; Sneha Anu; Akhil; Roma S Lenin; Aaromal Thirumurukan
- Cinematography: Rajesh Rethnas
- Edited by: Sarath Geetha Lal
- Music by: Ankit Menon
- Production companies: Better Earth Entertainments; Mania Movie Magix International
- Distributed by: Mania Reels
- Release dates: 2021; 18 April 2026 (India)
- Running time: 110 minutes
- Country: India
- Language: Malayalam

Thala (transl. The Head) is a 2021 Indian independent children's film written and directed by Khais Millen. It was produced by Better Earth Entertainment in association with Mania Movie Magix International. The film stars Surabhi Lakshmi in the lead role.

Thala premiered at DIFF-Newyork and was shown at the NIFF-New Delhi, SIFF Sweden, and Pan African Film Festival Nigeria. At the 52nd Kerala State Film Awards, the film won the Best Child Artist (female) award for Sneha Anu.

== Premise ==
An abandoned human head (in Malayalam 'Thala' means 'head') is found by some slum kids.

== Cast ==
The film is mostly a child actors production. Most of the cast is therefore composed of newcomers. The producers claim it introduced 333 new faces to the cinema industry, all of them originating from local slums.

- Surabhi Lakshmi as Muthu
- Binoy Antony as Appu
- Shaalin Zoya as Manikutty
- Murugan Martin as Stalin
- Jinu Kuttikkatt as Kalaam
- Sreevidya Mullachery as Maala
- Sneha Anu as Mullu
- Akhil as Chakochi
- Arun Nayar as Ayyappan
- Roma S Lenin as Roma
- Roshan S Lenin as Roshan
- Aaromal Thirumurukan as Aaromal
- Harikrishnan Sanu as Ganesan
- Shah Muhammed as Sudheeran

== Accolades ==
| Year | Award/Festival | Category | Judging Status | Recipient | Ref |
|---|---|---|---|---|---|
| 2022 | 52nd Kerala State Film Awards | Best Child Artist | Winner | Sneha Anu | |
| 2022 | 9th Noida International Film Festival | Best Film Editing | Winner | Sarath Geetha Lal | |
| 2022 | Boden International Film Festival | Best Feature Film | Winner | Khais Millen | |

== Music ==
Thala

Soundtrack album by Ankit Menon
- Released: 17 February 2021
- Recorded: 2021–2022
- Genre: Film soundtrack
- Length: 11:57
- Language: Malayalam
- Label: Muzik247
External audio
- Thala (Official Audio Song) on YouTube

Singles from Thala
- 1. "Poonkodiye" Released: 17 February 2021; 2. "Thala Pokki Pidiyeda Mone" Released: 15 May 2021; 3. "Urunduveena" Released: 1 February 2022

The songs were composed by Ankit Menon, produced and arranged by Ankit Menon.

Thala

| No. | Title | Lyrics | Music | Singer(s) | Length |
|---|---|---|---|---|---|
| 1. | "Poonkodiye" | Vinayak Sasikumar | Ankit Menon | Sid Sriram | 05:20 |
| 2. | "Thala Pokki Pidiyeda Mone" | Vinayak Sasikumar | Ankit Menon | Gana Bala | 04:10 |
| 3. | "Urunduveena" | Khais Millen | Ankit Menon | Ranjin Raj | 03:10 |
