= Serin George =

Indian model, photographer and digital creator

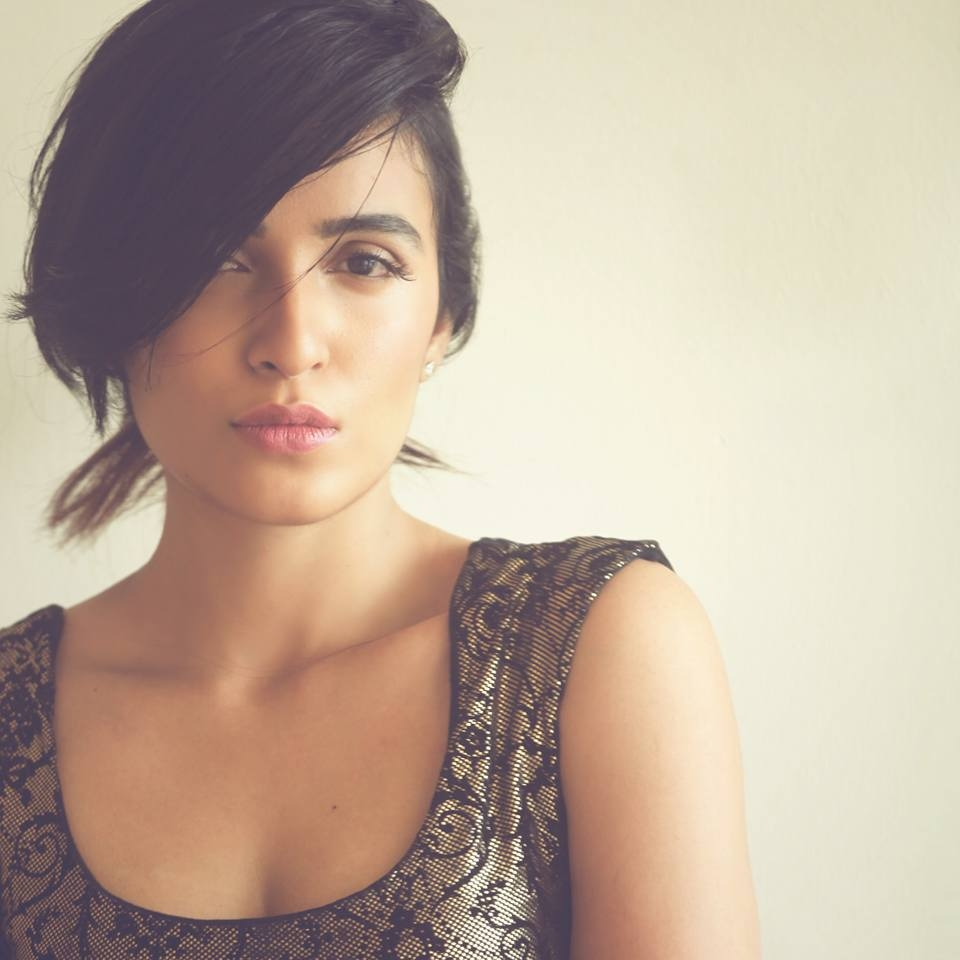
- Born: Vizag, India
- Occupations: Digital Creator, model
- Known for: Fashion photography, modelling
- Relatives: Tanishq Reddy

Serin George is an Indian model, photographer and a digital creator.

== Education ==
George completed her schooling in Vizag, Kerala and her undergraduate degree at Amal Jyothi College of Engineering in Kottayam. She holds a BTech Degree in Computer Science.

== Career ==
George has worked as a model. In 2007 she participated and won the Navy Queen title, held at the Southern Naval Command in Kochi.

She is also a fitness enthusiast
