= I Am That Change =

- Film poster
- Directed by: Sukumar
- Written by: Sukumar
- Produced by: Allu Arjun
- Starring: Allu Arjun; Tanishq Reddy
- Cinematography: Amol Rathod
- Edited by: Prawin Pudi
- Music by: Sai Karthik
- Production company: Geetha Arts
- Distributed by: YouTube
- Release date: 14 August 2014
- Running time: 3 minutes
- Country: India
- Language: Telugu

I Am That Change is a 2014 Indian Telugu-language short film directed by Sukumar. Produced by actor Allu Arjun for Geetha Arts, he co-stars in the film alongside Tanishq Reddy and several newcomers.

The film premiered the night before Independence Day 2014 to positive reception.

== Plot ==
A rich brat answers a call and continues to drive his car against the rules. When a traffic constable stops him, the man offers a bribe of ₹500. On a parallel note, a student is unable to write her exams, and her friend offers her an additional sheet for copying the answers. On another note, a kid drinks a cool drink, drops the paper cup near a dustbin, and walks away with his father, only to halt after a short distance. On the other hand, Allu Arjun attends a public meeting without allowing the security to check him.

However, Allu Arjun soon realizes his mistake and lets the security check him. Then, there is a realization from the traffic constable, who fines the rich brat. The boy also realizes his mistake and drops the cup in the dustbin. The girl in the examination refuses to copy answers from the additional sheet, and they perform their duties without indulging in corruption or antisocial behavior. The short film ends with Allu Arjun conveying the message, "Performing one's duty is a form of patriotism. Change begins with us. I am that change. Be that change", with the other three saying, "I am that change".

== Cast ==
- Allu Arjun as himself
- Tanishq Reddy as the rich brat
- Trisha as a school student
- Sri Varshini as a school student

== Production ==
The short film was shot in Hyderabad in the first half of August 2014 before Independence Day. The film was shot in two days.

== Release ==
The short film was released on 14 August 2014 around 8:30 PM, a day before the 68th Independence Day of India as a tribute. Upon its release, the short film received two million views. It was also screened in theaters which received similar response from the audience. Few days later its release, Allu Arjun received flak from his fans following an online video in which he is seen skipping a drunk-and-drive test and arguing with policemen which is contrary to message given in the short film. However, he clarified that he took the test and was let go.
