= Victory (2008 film) =

2008 Telugu film by Ravi. C. Kumar

- DVD cover
- Directed by: Ravikumar Chavali
- Produced by: R. R. Venkat
- Starring: Nithiin; Mamta Mohandas; Sindhu Tolani; Shashank; Ashutosh Rana
- Cinematography: Vijay C. Kumar
- Edited by: K. V. Krishna Reddy
- Music by: Chakri
- Production company: R. R. Movie Makers
- Release date: 27 June 2008
- Running time: 154 min
- Country: India
- Language: Telugu

Victory is a 2008 Indian Telugu-language political action drama film directed by Ravi. C. Kumar, released in 2008. Produced by R.R. Venkat under the banner of R.R. Movie Makers, the film stars Nithiin, Mamta Mohandas, Shashank, Sindhu Tolani and Ashutosh Rana. Chakri composed the music for the film, Vijaya Kumar C. handled the cinematography and K.V. Krishna Reddy edited the film.

== Plot ==
Vijji, a vibrant, energetic youngster who is also a very responsible boy. The film throws light on the dreaded land mafia.

== Cast ==
- Nithiin as Vijay Chandra a.k.a. Vijji
- Mamta Mohandas as Janaki
- Sindhu Tolani as Sindhu
- Shashank as Ravi Kumar
- Ashutosh Rana as MLA K. Devaraj
- Duvvasi Mohan as Satyam
- Brahmanandam as R. Appa Rao
- Satya Prakash as Corrupted IPS Officer
- Tanikella Bharani as Vijji's father
- Ali as The person who tries to corrupt the government officials
- M. S. Narayana
- Ravi Babu as Laxman Rao
- Ajay as Contract Killer
- Supreeth Reddy as M. Pandu Ranga
- Krishna Bhagawan as MRO Divadheenam
- Vijaya Rangaraju as Pochaiah
- Nutan Prasad as Judge
- Devadas Kanakala as DGP
- Ranganath as Defence Lawyer
- Jenny as Vijji's uncle
- Abhinayashree

== Production ==
Nithiin developed six packs for the film.

== Soundtrack ==
Music composed by Chakri.

Victory

Soundtrack album by Chakri
- Released: May 2008
- Genre: Soundtrack
- Label: Aditya Music

Chakri chronology
Krishna (2008)	Victory (2008)	Nagaram (2008)

Track list
No.	Title	Lyrics	Artist(s)	Length
1.	"Sunley Zara"	Kaluva Krishna Sai	Naveen, Mamta Mohandas	4:04
2.	"Premanedhi Manasu"	Chandrabose	Karthik, Kousalya	3:44
3.	"Jenifer Laa"	Kaluva Krishna Sai	Nithiin, Mamta Mohandas, Shashank	4:45
4.	"O Bachelor"	Chandrabose	Zubeen Garg, Sunidhi Chauhan	4:45
5.	"Sainikulye Kadilare"	Kaluva Krishna Sai	Ranjith	4:18
6.	"Myne Thumse"	Kaluva Krishna Sai	Ravi Verma, Kousalya	3:50

== Reception ==
Radhika Rajamani of Rediff.com rated the film 2 1/2 out of 5 stars and wrote that "On the whole, Victory is contemporary and slightly different from the run-of-the-mill fare, which makes it watchable". Krishna KBS of fullhyd.com rated the film three out of ten and wrote that "Unless you are a fan of Nitin and are willing to drool over his well-sculpted body, keep away from this slip-shod flick.".
