= Race (2011 film) =

- Directed by: Kukku Surendran
- Written by: Robin Thirumala; Kukku Surendran
- Produced by: Jose K George; Shaji Mecheri
- Starring: Indrajith; Kunchacko Boban; Mamta Mohandas; Baby Anikha
- Cinematography: Pramod Varma
- Edited by: Bipin Mannoor
- Music by: Gopi Sundar; Viswajith
- Production company: Penta Vision
- Distributed by: Red One Media Lab; Kalasangham Films
- Release date: 11 February 2011
- Country: India
- Language: Malayalam

Race is a 2011 Malayalam-language thriller film directed by Kukku Surendran, starring Indrajith, Kunchacko Boban, Mamta Mohandas, Baby Anikha, and Gowri Munjal. The story is based on Greg Iles's novel 24 hours. The film opened in Kerala theatres on 11 February 2011 to negative reviews. It was dubbed into Telugu as Game by Narne Media Solutions (Pvt) Limited in 2013. It was a remake of the Hindi film Deadline: Sirf 24 Ghante.

== Plot ==
Dr. Eby John (Kunchacko Boban) is a successful cardiac surgeon, leading a happy family life with his wife, Niya (Mamta Mohandas), and their lovely daughter, Achu (Baby Anika). One day, while Eby is attending a conference in Bengaluru, a lady named Shweta (Gowri Munjal) tells him that her friends have kidnapped his daughter and wife and are holding them captive in their home. It goes without saying that the child's life will be in danger if he fails to meet their demand for Rs 1 crore within twenty-four hours. Hence, the title "Race", denoting 'race against time'.

== Cast ==
- Indrajith as Niranjan Menon
- Kunchacko Boban as Dr. Eby John
- Gowri Munjal as Swetha
- Mamta Mohandas as Niya
- Anikha Surendran as Achu
- Jagathy Sreekumar as Eldo
- Chembil Ashokan as Varghese
- Geetha Vijayan as Susan
- Sreejith Ravi as police commissioner Bijuraj
- Joju George as Aanad Patel
- Pradeep Kottayam as Prasad John
- Manu Jose as Kiran
- Eldho Selvaraghavaj as Dr. Balakrishnan
- Kavitha as Sushama

== Home video ==
This movie was released on DVD and Blu-ray Disc in India in 2011 and the second film was released on Blu-ray in Malayalam.
