= Aakashvani =

Indian romantic drama film

- Theatrical release poster
- Directed by: Khais Millen
- Written by: Vinod Jayakumar; Vinod Vijayakumaran
- Produced by: Pravin Arackal
- Starring: Vijay Babu; Kavya Madhavan
- Cinematography: Indrajith
- Edited by: Lijo Paul
- Music by: Rahul Subrahmanian; Anil Gopalan; Anna Katharina Valayil; Sree Sankar
- Production companies: Royal Splendour Creations; Friday Tickets Release
- Release date: 19 February 2016
- Country: India
- Language: Malayalam

Aakashvani is a 2016 Indian Malayalam-language romantic drama film directed by Khais Millen and starring Vijay Babu and Kavya Madhavan. The film was released on 19 February 2016 to mixed reviews.

== Cast ==
- Vijay Babu as Akash
- Kavya Madhavan as Vani
- Lalu Alex as Vani's father
- Saiju Kurup as Jamal
- Sreejith Ravi as Shibu
- Lijo Jose Pellissery as Thomas Kuruvila
- Sandra Thomas as Mariya

== Soundtrack ==
Aakashvani

Soundtrack album by Rahul Subrahmanian, Anil Gopalan, Anna Katharina Valayil, Sree Sankar
- Released: 2016
- Genre: Feature film soundtrack
- Length: 23:28
- Language: Malayalam
- Label: Satyam Audios
External audio
- Aakashvani – Jukebox on YouTube

The film has songs composed by Rahul Subrahmanian, Anil Gopalan, Anna Katharina Valayil, and Sree Sankar.

Track listing
No.	Title	Lyrics	Music	Singer(s)	Length
1.	"Maayum Sandhye"	Vinayak	Rahul Subrahmanian	Remya Nambeesan, Arun Alat	5:02
2.	"Doorangal Thaandi"	Sabeena Shajahan	Anil Gopalan	Vineeth Sreenivasan	4:59
3.	"Mazhakonjal"	Sabeena Shajahan	Anil Gopalan	Sandeep	4:48
4.	"Parannu Parannu"	Anna Katharina Valayil, Fazal	Anna Katharina Valayil	Anna Katharina Valayil	4:07
5.	"Kaalam Ni"	Kavya Madhavan	Sree Sankar	Abhay Jodhpurkar, Anna Katharina Valayil	4:32
Total length:					23:28

== Reception ==
The film generally received unflattering reviews. Sanjith Sidhardhan of The Times of India rated the film 2/5 stars and wrote, "While Akashvani does show that effective communication can breathe fresh life into most failing marriages, it has nothing new to offer and is a flick that you wouldn't mind giving a miss". Arathi Kannan of Onmanorama gave the film the same rating and wrote, "While the film tries to get the idea across that people have their reasons to want to do different things in life, the thought is marred by the many challenges that it puts forth, the foremost being sitting through it, without ambling into sensible pastures".
