= Homam (film) =

- Movie Poster
- Directed by: J. D. Chakravarthy
- Written by: Kona Venkat (dialogues)
- Screenplay by: J. D. Chakravarthy
- Story by: J. D. Chakravarthy
- Produced by: Kiran Kumar Koneru
- Starring: Jagapathi Babu; J.D. Chakravarthy; Mamta Mohandas; Madhurima Tuli
- Cinematography: Bharani K. Dharan
- Edited by: Bhanodaya
- Music by: Nithin Raikwar; Amar Mohile (background score)
- Production company: Shreya Productions
- Distributed by: Sri Venkateswara Creations
- Release date: 29 August 2008
- Running time: 142 mins
- Country: India
- Language: Telugu

Homam (transl. Ritual) is a 2008 Indian Telugu-language thriller film, produced by Kiran Kumar Koneru on Shreya Productions banner and written and directed by J. D. Chakravarthy. The film stars Chakravarthy himself along with Jagapathi Babu, Mamta Mohandas, and Madhurima Tuli. The music was composed by Nithin Raikwar, while Amar Mohile worked the film's background score. Cinematography and editing were handled by Bharani K. Dharan and Bhanodaya, respectively. The plot is inspired from the American film The Departed, which itself was based on the 2002 Hong Kong film Infernal Affairs. The film released on 29 August 2008.

== Plot ==
The film begins with hostility between DIG Viswanath, a candid and underworld kingpin Jawaharlal / Daddy. Mallikarjun, the son of a notorious criminal, aims to be a sincere police and top scores. Anyhow, he repudiated owing to his family history. Viswanath inspired and experts him as an undercover cop to nab Daddy. Consequently, Daddy rears an orphan Chandrashekar and ruses to designate him as police for reverse artifice. Malli enrolls in Daddy's wing, acquires his credence, and turns into his sidekick. Chandu is forged as a sheer cop and owns the best standing. Malli loves Dr. Mahalakshmi, and Chandu falls for his neighbor Satya. Once Viswanath gets intel from Malli regarding the vast drug trafficking of Daddy. He immediately takes action, surrounds Daddy, and waits for a spot. Simultaneously, Chandu craftily speaks volumes to Daddy, which ends with Daddy relatively absconding. At that moment, Daddy proclaims to Viswanath about the presence of his man in the department. Like a shot, Viswanath spells occupancy of his spy in his gang. Two teams move several pawns to get the black sheep in that alarm.

Meanwhile, when Malli's mother is ailing, he states his identity, which she cannot believe. So Malli secretly rendezvous with Viswanath to disclose him as a genuine person who promises to do so. At this point, Chandu detects the squealer is on hand and notifies Daddy. Forthwith, Daddy arrives therein when Malli escapes in a bet. Tragically, Viswanath dies in the attack. It forms a severe impact on Malli as Viswanath is the one who knows the truth. However, his secret computer preserves the piece of identity. Concurrently, Daddy has laid the groundwork for a new deal when Chandu advises that it is not the right time. Accordingly, Daddy mumbles scorn and intimidates him. In bride, Chandu scans the link between Viswanath and Malli when he communicates and requests Malli to mingle with him to accomplish Viswanath's dream, which he accepts. Utilizing Malli, Chandu eliminates Daddy as vengeance and buries his diabolic shade. The next, Chandu asks Malli to collect his ID at his office, where Malli realizes Chandu is a miscreant and felon. Till then, Chandu destroys his ID, and Malli tactically unearths the truth by entrapping Chandu. At last, Chandu is knocked out in a police encounter. Finally, the movie ends on a happy note with Malli getting his recognition and proceeding to Pakistan on a covert operation which hints towards a sequel named "Maranahomam".

== Cast ==
- Jagapathi Babu as Mallikarjun IPS alias Malli, who works undercover to Daddy for Viswanath.
- J. D. Chakravarthy as Chandrashekhar IPS "Chandu", A cop under ruuss who works for Daddy.
- Mamta Mohandas as Dr. Mahalakshmi, Malli's love interest
- Madhurima Tuli as Satya, Chandu's love interest
- Pradeep Rawat as DIG Viswanath IPS
- Mahesh Manjrekar as Jawahar alias Daddy, an underworld kingpin
- Ahuti Prasad as DGP Jayaram ( Dept. of Crime & Intelligence)
- M. S. Narayana as PC Sarkar
- Krishna Bhagawan
- Brahmaji as SP Nayak, a loyal sub-ordinate to Viswanath
- Janaki as Tayaru, Malli's mother
- Raja Ravindra as Inspector Arshad
- C. V. L. Narasimha Rao as Advocate Subba Rao
- Bangalore Padma as Sarkar's wife
- ETV Prabhakar as Potti Sathi
- Ram Jagan as Tumry
- Tarzan as Goud
- Sakshi Sivanand as item Number
- Jyothi Rana as item Number

== Soundtrack ==
Homam

Film score by Nithin Raikwar
- Released: 2008
- Genre: Soundtrack
- Length: 23:59
- Label: Aditya Music
- Producer: Nithin Raikwar

Music was composed by Nithin Raikwar. Lyrics were written by Suddala Ashok Teja. Music was released on ADITYA Music Company.

No.	Title	Singer(s)	Length
1.	"Ye Pagale"	J. D. Chakravarthy, Shivani	3:52
2.	"Yey Mister Ninne"	Nihal, Shivani, Mamta Mohandas	3:31
3.	"Pedavikidem Kasiro"	Jagapati Babu, JD Chakravarthy, Mamta Mohandas	4:32
4.	"Magaallu Mee Maatalo"	JD Chakravarthy, Madhusri	4:59
5.	"Katti Naaku Gucchadammo"	Mahathi	3:31
6.	"Homam"	Vinod Rathod	3:31
Total length:			23:59

== Reception ==
Released on 29 August 2008, the film opened to mixed reviews. Rediff.com thought that Chakravarthy fared better as an actor than as a director. While continuing in its discussion, it specifically commends Jagapathi Babu and Mahesh Manjrekar for their performances. The female actors, Mamta Mohandas and debutant Madhurima were added to the glamour quotient.
