= Rahul Subrahmanian =

- Also known as: Rahul S Unni
- Born: 26 November 1989 (age 36); Chottanikkara, Kerala, India
- Occupations: Music composer, Music director, Singer
- Instruments: Tabla, Chenda, Mridangam and Piano
- Years active: 2011- Present
- Spouse: Debbie Susan Chembakassery (m. 2024)

Rahul Subrahmanian (born 26 November 1989) is an Indian music composer and playback singer, recognized for his work in Malayalam cinema. His debut as a playback singer was in the 2011 film Thattathin Marayathu, directed by Vineeth Sreenivasan.

== Early life ==
He attended Mahatma Gandhi Public School and Georgian Academy for his schooling and pursued higher education at BPC College, Piravom. Before starting his music career, he worked as an HR assistant at Schneider Electric in Bangalore

== Personal life ==
He was born in Chottanikkara, Cochin, Kerala, to Subrahmaniam Unni and Jayasree and has a sister, Ramya Nambeesan, who is a well-known actress. His father, a former theater artist, was an active member of renowned troupes such as 'Jubilee' and 'Harishree. His father ran 'Srihari Musical Academy' from their home, and he practiced music from Class 1.

Rahul Subrahmanian is married to Debbie Susan Chembakassery on 12 June 2024.

== Discography ==
Year	Films	Language	Songs	Background Score	Notes
2011	Thattathin Marayathu	Malayalam	No	No	As playback singer
2013	Philips and the Monkey Pen	Malayalam	Yes	Yes	Awarded BIG FM Debut Music Director Award
2015	Jo and the Boy	Malayalam	Yes	Yes	
2016	Aakashvani	Malayalam	No	Yes	
2019	Prakashante Metro	Malayalam	Yes	Yes	
2019	Sullu	Malayalam	No	Yes	
2019	Safe	Malayalam	Yes	Yes	
2021	Home	Malayalam	Yes	Yes	
2022	Meppadiyan	Malayalam	Yes	Yes	
2024	Kunddala Puranam	Malayalam	No	Yes	
2026	Kathanaar – The Wild Sorcerer	Malayalam	Yes	Yes	Upcoming Release
TBA	Namukku Kodathiyil Kaanam	Malayalam	Yes	Yes	Upcoming Release

== Recent projects ==
Recent projects are the peppy track 'Fly with Me,' which he co-created with musicians Arjun Sasi, Ramya Nambeesan, and Akhil J. Chand. It was produced as a response to the challenging times of the pandemic.

== Awards and recognition ==
- 2013: Best FM Debut Music Director Award for Philips and the Monkey Pen
