= Pokkiri Simon =

- Theatrical release poster
- Directed by: Jijo Antony
- Written by: K. Ampady
- Produced by: Krishnan Sethukumar
- Starring: Sunny Wayne; Prayaga Martin; Jacob Gregory; Appani Sarath; Dileesh Pothan; Nedumudi Venu
- Narrated by: Dulquer Salmaan
- Cinematography: Pappinu
- Edited by: Lijo Paul
- Music by: Gopi Sunder
- Production companies: Srivari Films; Murali Films
- Distributed by: East Coast Films
- Release date: 22 September 2017 (India)
- Country: India
- Language: Malayalam

Pokkiri Simon is a 2017 Indian Malayalam-language action comedy film directed by Jijo Antony. Sunny Wayne and Prayaga Martin play the lead roles. whereas Jacob Gregory, Appani Sarath, Nedumudi Venu, Dileesh Pothan, Saiju Kurup, Shammy Thilakan, Baiju Santhosh, Ashokan, Marshall Titto, Bitto, and Thanuja Kartik play in the supporting roles. The film was produced by Krishnan Sethukumar under the banner of Srivari films. The story, screenplay and dialogue of the film were written by Dr. K. Ampady. The cinematography is by Pappinu. The film is loosely based on the life of the Kerala fans of actor Vijay.

== Plot ==
Simon, Biju and Ganesh who are local boys bound by their love for Vijay. Though their parents want them to earn a living, they lead a carefree life. Arjunan Muthalali and his brother Indran are petty criminals. One day, Simon and friends are returning a cutout of Vijay to a movie theater, and the cutout is hit by Indran's car, breaking its legs. In a rage, they fight with Indran and gang.

Indran is admitted to hospital and Simon is arrested by SI Satyan. Simon is soon released from custody by CI Alex who is close to Simon and the gang. Simon's father constable Yesudas gets a flash drive from a fully burnt body while examining it. Goons sent by Arjunan come to Yesudas' house to retrieve the drive, but Simon fights them off. Knowing the power of Arjunan, Yesudas returns the drive and asks Arjunan to spare his son and friends.

To get in touch with Deepa Simon takes Ganesh's daughter Jennifer to Deepa's dance class. One day Simon drops Jenni off in front of her house after class. Ganesh informs Simon that his daughter is missing. Simon searches for her. He finds out that a racket abducts children and uses them for begging. A man from the gang is brought to his house and Simon interrogates him.

Meanwhile, Jennifer is released by the gang and is admitted to the hospital. Simon learns Arjunan is behind the racket and that some children are used in the organ trade. It is revealed that the burnt body was of doctor Jomon, who had discovered the illegal activities in Arjunan's hospital and placed the details on the flash drive. They burned his body to destroy all evidence related to the crime.

Biju had taken the copy of the contents in the flash drive hoping for an adult film in it. The drive instead contained details of Arjunan's racket. Simon and friends with CI Alex and Prof. Seetharaman meet Arjunan and his gang at their hideout. It is revealed by then Alex was Arjunan's partner in crime. Alex's intention was to garner local support for the upcoming election without any expense. Hence, he befriended Thalapathy fans and joined forces with Arjunan. But the man from the beggar gang already told Simon about Alex's involvement. The fans fight the villains. Alex and Arjunan and his gang are sent to jail. Alex explains how he ended up in jail to his inmates Jude Anthany Joseph and Sudhi Koppa. Simon has become a police constable and the last scene shows that he and Deepa together watching "Bairavaa" acted by Vijay.

== Cast ==
- Sunny Wayne as Head Constable "Pokkiri" Simon Yesudas
- Prayaga Martin as Deepa
- Jacob Gregory as Hanuman Biju
- Appani Sarath as "Love today" Ganesh
- Janaki as Jennifer
- Nedumudi Venu as Prof. Seetha Raman
- Dileesh Pothan as C.I Alex
- Saiju Kurup as Beemapally Noushad
- Shammi Thilakan as Arjunan
- Tito Wilson as Indran
- Ashokan as H.C Yesudas, Simon's father
- Baiju as S.I Sathyan
- Marshal Tito as Indran
- Sajid Yahiya as Singam Suni
- Vijay Menon as Mariner Somashekahran, Deepa's father
- Thara Kalyan as Sreedevi aka Sree, Deepa's mother
- Bitto as Moosa
- Hemanth Menon as Jomon
- Rajesh Hebbar as Jomon's father
- Renuka as Mahalakshmi
- Poojappura Ravi as Security
- Anjali Aneesh as Ganesh's wife, Jayamol
- Thanuja Kartik as Tessa
- Erode Mahesh as Tandoori

Guest appearances

- Jude Anthany Joseph as a prisoner
- Hannah Reji Koshy as Mariamma
- Siddique as City Police Commissioner John Alexander IPS
- Sudeep Kopa
- Pradeep Kottayam
- Poojappura Radhakrishnan as Hanuman Baiju's father
- Govindan Kutty as Proposed man
- Chempil Ashokan
- Dr. Shaju Sham as Proposed man's father
- KPAC Leelamani as Hanuman Baiju's mother
- Deepika Mohan as Proposed man's mother
- Sreekala Thaha as Nun's mother
- Anita Dileep

== Music ==
The music and background scores are by Gopi Sundar. The songs are sung by Karthik, Sithara. The film has three songs. The lyrics are by Harinarayanan. The music is released by East Coast Music.

== Soundtrack ==
Track listing
No.	Title	Lyrics	Music	Singer(s)	Length
1.	"Pokkiri Song"	Hari Narayan	Gopi Sunder	Karthik	2:58
2.	"Mampazhakkalam"	Hari Narayan	Gopi Sunder	Ramshi, Sithara Krishnakumar	4:08
3.	"Pullimaane"	Hari Narayan	Gopi Sunder	Sachin Warrier	3:35
