= Chakkiligintha =

- Theatrical release poster
- Directed by: Vema Reddy
- Written by: Vema Reddy; Jayanth Panuganti
- Produced by: Narasimha Chary; Narasimha Reddy Ilavala
- Starring: Sumanth Ashwin; Chandini Sreedharan
- Cinematography: Sai Sriram
- Edited by: Karthika Srinivas
- Music by: Mickey J. Meyer
- Production company: Sri Ranjith Movies
- Release date: 5 December 2014
- Country: India
- Language: Telugu

Chakkiligintha (transl. Tickle) is a 2014 Indian Telugu-language romantic drama film starring Sumanth Ashwin and Chandini Sreedharan. It was directed by Vema Reddy, an erstwhile assistant and protégé of Sukumar.

== Plot ==
Adi and Avantika or Avi study in the same college. Adi is a love guru and advises boys not to express their love for girlfriends until they reveal their true feelings. On the other side Avi learns that Adi is the person behind the sudden change in the boys and challenges that she will make Adi to fall in love with her.

Adi comes up with a new concept, why should girls have all the fun? He lectures his friends that instead of them running around the girls, it should be the other way round. He sells his theory. The girls, understandably, are taken aback with the boys ignoring them. They feel miserable. If Adi's got a concept that's changed the nature of the boys, Avi comes up with an idea to counter that concept. The girls pin their hopes on Avi, and eventually with her plans working out, the boys once again behave like boys, running after them and doing their bidding.

Adi and Avi throw a challenge at each other. Adi will behave like Avi is his girlfriend and Avi too will consider him as her boyfriend. Avi will try to make Adi express his love for her and Adi tells her he will never ever do that.

Smart as she proves to be, Avi is clearly winning at every stage. And one day, it happens in front of everyone. Adi declares his love for Avi. He accepts that his concept has failed and it is not right for boys to expect that it should be girls who should be the first ones to express their love. But Adi gets a shock. Avi tells him that she does not love him and her only purpose in moving around with him was to prove that his concept was wrong.

Avi goes back to her hometown Visakhapatnam but Adi follows her from Hyderabad. Avi's wedding is fixed with another boy as she consents to the proposal that her parents bring. What will Adi do?

== Cast ==
- Sumanth Ashwin as Adi
- Chandini Sreedharan (credited as Rehhana) as Avantika "Avi"
- Chaitanya Krishna as Rahul
- Viva Harsha as Hrithik Reddy
- Thagubothu Ramesh as Manohar
- Madhunandan as Varun
- Chammak Chandra as Ailesh
- Tanishq Reddy as Gautham
- Bhadram as Adi's classmate
- Surekha Vani as Avi's mother
- Sivannarayana Naripeddi as Avi's father
- Josh Ravi as Ravi
- Fish Venkat as Adi's classmate's father
- Ambati Srinivas as Recharge shop owner
- Saptagiri
- Getup Srinu as College student
- Sudigali Sudheer as Bar Waiter (uncredited)

== Soundtrack ==
Chakkiligintha

Soundtrack album by Mickey J. Meyer
- Released: 2014
- Recorded: 2014
- Genre: Soundtrack
- Length: 23:50
- Label: Shreyas Music
- Producer: Mickey J. Meyer

Mickey J. Meyer chronology
Subramanyam for Sale (2014)	Chakkiligintha (2014)	Mukunda (2014)

The music was composed by Mickey J. Meyer and was released by Shreyas Music.

Track-List
No.	Title	Lyrics	Singer(s)	Length
1.	"Avoid Girls"	Ananta Sriram	Siddharth, Aditya, Anudeep Dev	4:16
2.	"Baby My Lover"	Sri Mani	Mickey J. Meyer	4:03
3.	"Chakkiligintey"	Vanamali	Haricharan, Sai Shivani	4:08
4.	"Idivarakey"	Sri Mani	Karthik	3:45
5.	"Mayo Mayo"	Sri Mani	Aditya, Ramya Behara	3:44
6.	"O Kshanama"	Sri Mani	Ramya Behara	3:54
Total length:				23:50

== Critical reception ==
Ch Sushil Rao of The Times of India rated the film 3/5 stars and wrote, "A neat film with an interesting story told well, except that it could have been trimmed a bit. The locales, cinematography and music make the movie watchable." Suresh Kavirayani of Deccan Chronicle wrote, "Vema Reddy succeed only in parts in his debut’s venture. Except the lead pair good performance and a few jokes here and there, the film offers nothing. It’s a routine love story."
