= Saiju Kurup =

Indian actor

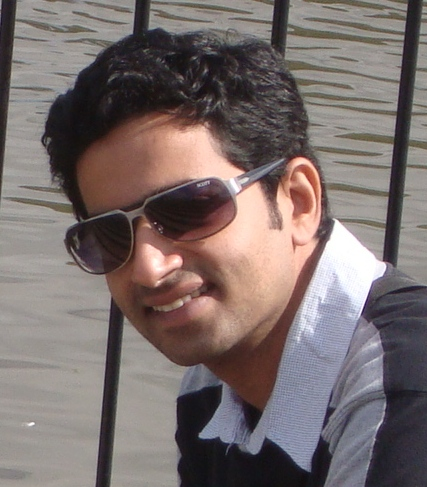
- Saiju Kurup
- Born: 12 March 1979 (age 47); Cherthala, Alappuzha district, Kerala, India
- Occupation: Actor
- Years active: 2005–present
- Spouse: Anupama B. Nambiar (m. 2005)
- Children: 2

Saiju Govinda Kurup (born 12 March 1979) is an Indian actor who works primarily in Malayalam cinema. He debuted in a leading role with Mayookham (2005), directed by Hariharan. He has starred in over 150 films, in supporting as well as leading roles.

== Early life ==
Kurup was born to N. Govinda Kurup and Sobhana in Alappuzha district, South Kerala. Although a native of Cherthala, he was brought up in Nagpur, where he completed his schooling and college education. He studied engineering in Nagpur. His father was posted in Kamptee. Following his father's retirement, the family relocated to Cherthala. After returning from Nagpur, Kurup joined Airtel office in Thiruvananthapuram. In 2004, while working there, he met singer M. G. Sreekumar as part of his sales role. Sreekumar, who had recorded a song for the film Mayookham, encouraged him to audition for the lead role. Kurup subsequently auditioned in Chennai and was selected for the role.

== Career ==
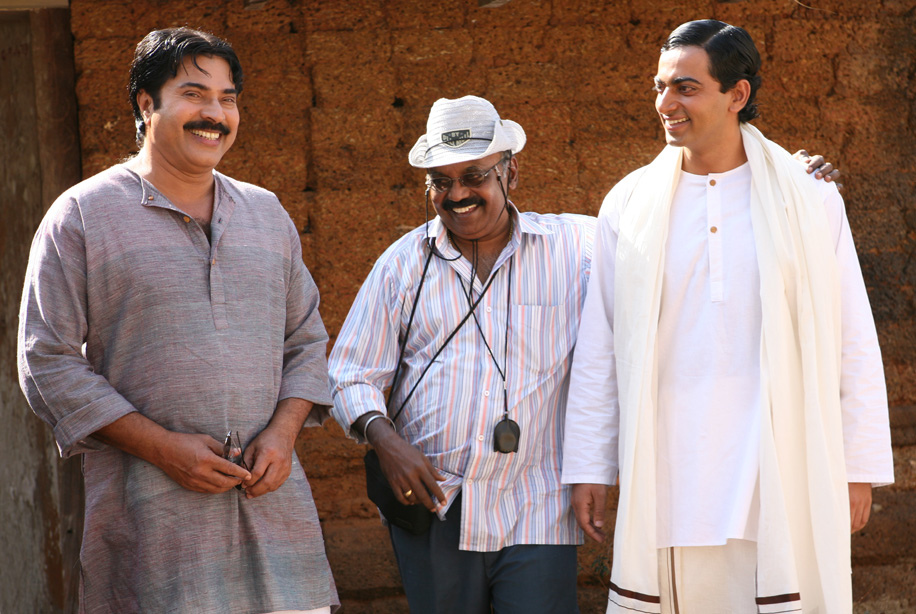
Kurup with Mammootty and Ramachandra Babu in 2007

Kurup made his acting debut in a leading role with Mayookham (2005), directed by Hariharan. Approximately a year and a half after the film's release, he resigned from his position at Airtel, though initial opportunities proved limited. Reflecting on his early performances, Kurup later noted that, "around the time of Mulla (2008), Doubles (2011), and Karmayogi (2012), I learnt to bring what I observed into my performances. That's when I found my rhythm".

His first breakthrough came with Trivandrum Lodge (2012), in which he portrayed a comedic character that marked a departure from his earlier roles. He observed that, "until then, I played clean-shaven, shirt-tucked-in characters. But Shibu Vellayini was raw and real, and people connected with him". He played another comedic role in Vedivazhipadu (2013).

Kurup starred and wrote the screenplay for the 2013 film My Fan Ramu. He appeared in a dual role in Hotel California (2013). He later played Pappan, a supportive brotherly figure in the sports drama 1983 (2014). For his role as an oncologist in Njandukalude Nattil Oridavela (2017), he undertook preparation by consulting a practicing doctor. In 2018, Deccan Chronicle noted that "very few have been able to carve a niche among the clan of supporting actors in Malayalam cinema where they have been an integral part of the movies as their characters work as adhesives in building up the story line. Saiju Kurup is one among them". His performance as Vijith in Theevandi (2018) received critical acclaim.

Kurup appeared as Johny Peringodan in Driving Licence (2019). In 2021, he played the lead role in the crime thriller Guardian. He played a pivotal role in Meppadiyan (2022), which was a commercial success. He played a psychologist in his first horror film Bhoothakalam (2022), which received positive response. Kurup played the lead role of a circle inspector in the thriller Anthakshari (2022). In the same year, he starred in the title role as a headstrong thug in Upacharapoorvam Gunda Jayan (2022), produced by Dulquer Salmaan.

In 2024, Kurup played the lead role in the drama Porattu Nadakam. He also made his television series debut that year with Jai Mahendran on SonyLIV, portraying the titular character, a principled yet astute tahsildar. The same year, he ventured into production with the comedy-drama Bhrathanatyam (2024), in which he also played the lead role. Although the film underperformed at the box office, it later received critical acclaim following its release on streaming platforms. In 2025, he played a leading role alongside Arjun Ashokan in Abhilasham. In 2025, The New Indian Express observed that Kurup "has built a steady presence in Malayalam cinema — not by chasing stardom, but by consistently turning in performances that resonate".

== Personal life ==
Kurup married Anupama B. Nambiar in 2005. She was a personality language development trainer in a multinational company. The couple have a daughter, Mayookha, and a son, Aftab. The family resides in Panampilly Nagar in Ernakulam district.

== Filmography ==
Key
†	Denotes films that have not yet been released

=== Malayalam ===
Year	Title	Role	Notes
2005	Mayookham	Unni Kesavan	Debut film
2006	Lion	Prasad	
2006	Ashwaroodan	Divakaran	
2006	Baba Kalyani	Tahir Mohammad	
2007	Sketch	Shivahari Iyer	
2007	Hallo	Praveen	
2007	Indrajith	Zaheer Mustafa	
2007	Chocolate	Manuel Abraham	
2008	College Kumaran	Raghu	
2008	Jubilee	Joji	
2008	Mulla	Bharathan	
2008	Parunthu	Vineet	
2008	Anthiponvettam	Nitin	
2008	Novel	Lekshmanan	
2009	Pramukhan	Ramesh Nambiar	
2009	Brahmasthram	Indrajeeth	
2010	Koottukar	ACP Antony Alex	
2011	Doubles	Sameer	
2011	Makaramanju	Raja Raja Varma	
2011	Scene No: 001	Chandramohan	
2011	Makeup Man	Sorrya's fiancé	
2012	Karmayogi	Kandhaa	
2012	Trivandrum Lodge	Shibu Vellayani	
2012	Poppins	Job	
2013	Red Wine	Navas Paramban	
2013	Kutteem Kolum	Sreehari	
2013	Hotel California	Tarun Singh Deol / Rafeeq Ahmed	
2013	Thank You	Arun	
2013	Left Right Left	Mathew	
2013	Tourist Home	Unknown	
2013	Bicycle Thieves	Rameshan	
2013	My Fan Ramu	Ramu	
2013	Vedivazhipadu	Sanjay	
2014	1983	Pappan	
2014	Konthayum Poonoolum	Johny	
2014	Medulla Oblongata	Appachan	
2014	Munnariyippu	Rajeev Thomas	
2014	Njaan	V P Kunjikannan	
2014	The Dolphins	Kandi	
2015	Aadu	Arakkal Abu	
2015	Chirakodinja Kinavukal	Commissioner K P Benny	
2015	Lukka Chuppi	Father Xavier	
2015	Nirnayakam	Ravi Shankar	
2015	KL 10 Patthu	Ajmal	
2015	Kohinoor	DySP Mohan Raghav	Cameo appearance
2015	Salt Mango Tree	Praveen Nambiar	
2015	Rajamma @ Yahoo	Yohanan	
2015	Rockstar	Registrar	
2016	Maalgudi Days	Manu Varma	
2016	Action Hero Biju	CI Manoj Mathew	
2016	Aakashvani	Jamal	
2016	Sahapadi 1975	Oola	
2016	Valleem Thetti Pulleem Thetti	Bhajrangan	
2016	Happy Wedding	Dhanendran	
2016	Annmariya Kalippilanu	Dr. Roy	
2016	IDI	Mr. X	
2016	Kavi Uddheshichathu..?	DySP Noble Jacob	
2016	Kolumittayi	Satheeshan Puzhakkara	
2016	Sivapuram	Unknown	
2017	Mannamkattayum Kariyilayum	Unknown	
2017	Kadam Kadha	Srikanth	
2017	Alamara	Prakasan	
2017	1971: Beyond Borders	Nathan	
2017	Adventures of Omanakuttan	Phillip	
2017	Careful	Ramesh Nath	
2017	Njandukalude Nattil Oridavela	Dr. Saiju	
2017	Pokkiri Simon	Beemapally Noushad	
2017	Tharangam	Siju	
2017	Vimaanam	Ananthan	
2017	Aadu 2	Arakkal Abu	
2018	Captain	Gupta IPS	
2018	Kalyanam	Kishore	
2018	Kala Viplavam Pranayam	Rameshan	
2018	B.Tech	Prasanthan	
2018	Naam	Masthan Sebastian	
2018	Iblis	Sukumaran	
2018	Theevandi	Vijith	
2018	Padayottam	Sreekuttan	
2018	Dakini	Vikraman Parudeesa	
2019	Kodathi Samaksham Balan Vakeel	Vidhyadharan	
2019	Sathyam Paranja Viswasikkuvo	Kuriyan	
2019	Janamaithri	Samyukthan	
2019	Kalki	Sooraj	
2019	Pranayaa Meenukalude Kadal	SI Eldho Sebastian	
2019	Android Kunjappan Version 5.25	Prasannan	
2019	Jack & Daniel	DySP Philip	
2019	Vaarthakal Ithuvare	Haneef	
2019	Thrissurpooram	Doctor	Cameo appearance
2019	Prathi Poovankozhi	Sreenath	
2019	Driving License	Johny Peringodan	
2020	Forensic	Xavier "Xavi" John Kattookkaran	
2020	C U Soon	Dr. Prashanth	
2021	Mohan Kumar Fans	Shobi	
2021	Aarkkariyam	Vyshak	
2021	Nizhal	Chief Judicial Magistrate Ajith	
2021	Pidikittapulli	Disney	
2021	Guardian	Dr Arun Jacob	
2021	Kurup	CI Praveen Chandran	
2022	Meppadiyan	Varkey (Philip)	
2022	Bhoothakaalam	George	
2022	Lalitham Sundaram	Sandeep	
2022	Oruthee	Sreekumar	
2022	Antakshari	Yesudas	
2022	Upacharapoorvam Gunda Jayan	Gunda Jayan	
2022	12th Man	Mathew	
2022	Prakashan Parakkatte	Kozhi Kuttan	
2022	Theerppu	Parameshwaran Potti	
2022	Mei Hoom Moosa	Meeran	
2022	Saturday Night	Justin	
2022	Gold	Jomon	
2022	Malikappuram	Ajayan / Ajayakumar	
2023	Enkilum Chandrike	Abhi	
2023	Janaki Jaane	Unni Mukundan	
2023	Madhura Manohara Moham	Jeevan Raj	
2023	Valatty	Dobermann	Voiceover
2023	Pappachan Olivilanu	Pappachan	
2023	Rajni	Abhijith	
2023	A Ranjith Cinema	Sunny	
2024	Abraham Ozler	Krishnadas	
2024	Gu	Sai	
2024	Nunakkuzhi	Dr. Jayadevan	
2024	Pallotty 90's Kids	Manjulan	
2024	Bharathanatyam	Sasidharan Nair	
2024	Porattu Nadakam	Abu	
2024	Anand Sreebala	DySP Sankar Das	
2025	Daveed	Kochappa	
2025	Aap Kaise Ho		
2025	Abhilasham	Abhilash Kumar	
2025	Azadi		
2025	Written & Directed by God	Jijo	
2025	Flask		
2025	Sumathi Valavu	Hari	
2025	Diés Iraé	George	
2026	Aadu 3	Arakkal Abu and Padanayakan Koma Kurup	
2026	Bharathanatyam 2 Mohiniyattam	Sasidharan Nair	
2026	Ankam Attahasam		
2026	Aaram		
2026	The Third Murder		
2026	Lurk		
2026	Prempaatta	Akash Vellathooval	
2027	Harivarasanam †	TBA	

=== Tamil ===
Year	Title	Role	Notes
2010	Siddhu +2	Police Officer	
2012	Marupadiyum Oru Kadhal	Jeeva	
2013	Aadhi Bhagavan	ACP Ranadev Patel	
2015	Thani Oruvan	Charles Chelladurai	
2023	Aval Peyar Rajni	Abhijith	

=== As dubbing artist ===
Year	Film	Dubbed for	Character
2014	@Andheri	Atul Kulkarni	Rajan Pillai
2014	Mr. Fraud	Dev Gill	Nikhil Adharva

=== Web series ===
Year	Title	Role	Notes
2024	Jai Mahendran	Mahendran	

== Short films ==
Year	Title	Role	Notes	Ref.
2015	Night Muller	The Husband	Malayalam Comedy Short Film	
2016	Purakathumbol	Prabhakaran M. L. A.	Malayalam Short Film	
2017	Invisible Actor	The Film Star	Malayalam Short Film	
2018	Sunnath Kalyanam	Abu	Malayalam Short Film	
2020	Kaazhchakkappuram	Circle Inspector	Kerala Police Awareness Movie	

== Television ==
Year	Title	Role	Language	Channel	Ref.
2016	6 Piece Pizza		Malayalam	Asianet	
2016	Annie's Kitchen	Guest	Malayalam	Amrita TV	
2021	Swantham Sujatha	Himself	Malayalam	Surya TV	
