= Methil Devika =

Indian dancer and actress

- Devika in 2019
- Born: 1976 (age 49–50); Dubai, United Arab Emirates
- Citizenship: Indian
- Education: Rabindra Bharati University, Kolkata (Master of Arts); University of Madras (Master of Business Administration); Bharathidasan University, Tiruchirappalli (Doctor of Philosophy)
- Occupations: Performing artist; Researcher
- Known for: Indian classical dance, Mohiniyattam
- Spouses: Rajeev Nair (m. 2002; div. 2004); Mukesh (m. 2013; div. 2021)
- Parents: N. Rajagopalan; Methil Rajeswari
- Relatives: Radhika Pillai (sister); Methil Renuka (sister)

Methil Devika is an Indian classical dancer, research supervisor and actress. She was a Senior Research Associate at ISRO's Indian Institute of Space Science and Technology, in 2023 working on an arts-integrated-advance-science project ideated by her.

She is currently doing Kerala Chief minister's Nava Kerala Post Doctoral Fellowship, conducting research on Temple Terrain as a New Performance Space for the Woman Dancer: A Study on How the Modern Woman Reinvents her Art in Esoteric Spaces. She has made her feature film debut with the Malayalam film Kadha Innuvare directed by Vishnu Mohan, a national film award-winning director.

== Early life ==
Devika was born in Dubai, UAE, to N. Rajagopalan and Methil Rajeswari. She has two elder sisters, Radhika Pillai (educator and art critic) and Methil Renuka, who is an editor at Forbes. Renowned writer Methil Radhakrishnan is her uncle. Writer V. K. N.'s wife, Vedavathi, is her aunt.

Devika was educated at The Indian High School, Dubai; St. Thomas Convent School, Palakkad; and Mercy College, Palakkad, before obtaining a BCom from Government Victoria College, Palakkad.

Devika did her MA at Rabindra Bharati University, Kolkata, with a first rank. She then earned an MBA from the University of Madras with first rank. She has also completed a PhD in Mohiniyattam from the Bharathidasan University, Tiruchirappalli.

== Performances ==
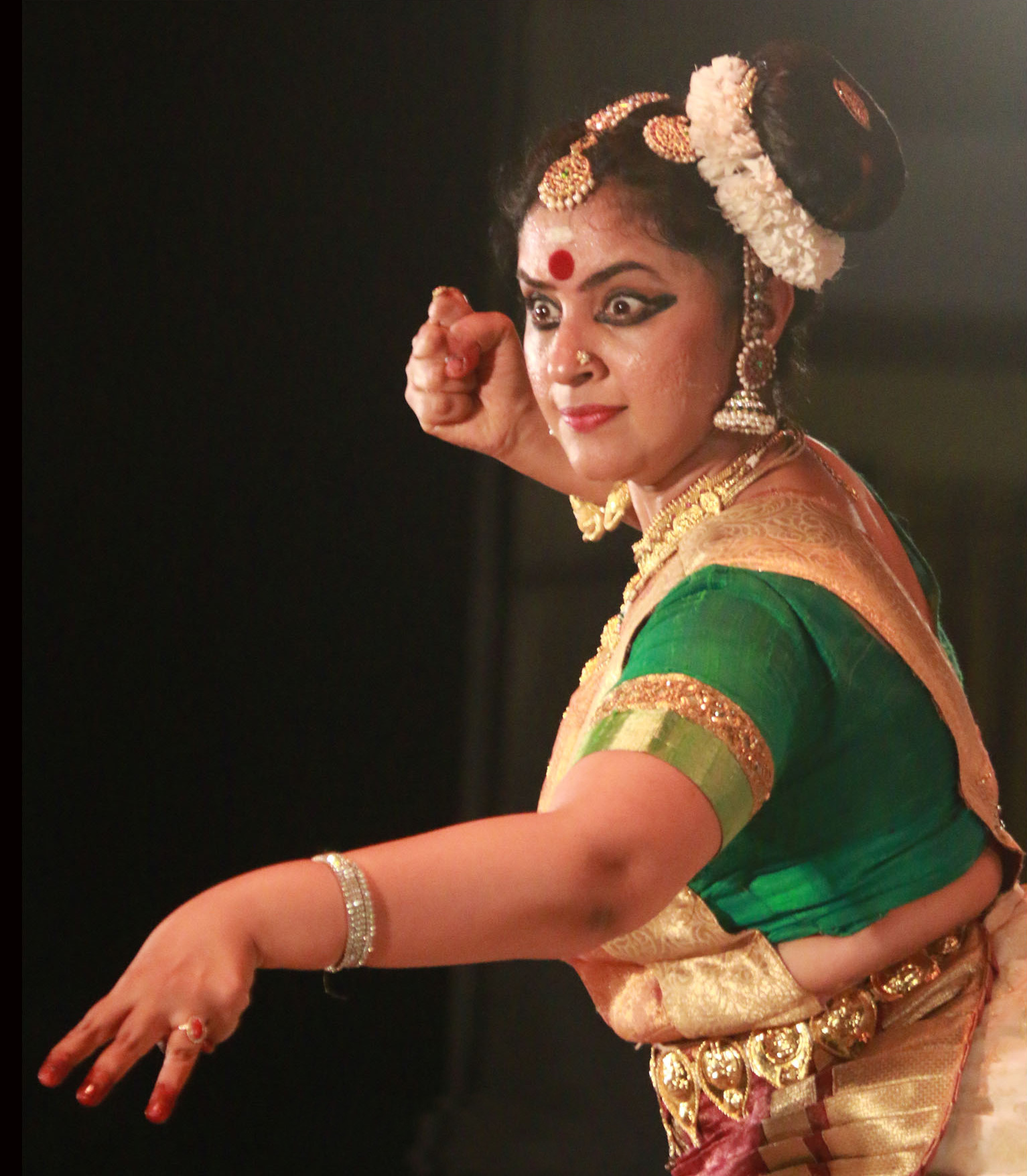
Methil Devika performing Mohiniyattam.

Devika has given solo performances in dance festivals in India, including Khajuraho International Festival.

She has performed at the Madras Music Academy, Mudra Festival and Nishagandhi Dance Festival. She has performed in Boston, New York City, Texas, Philadelphia, Laos, Chiang Mai, Sydney, and Melbourne.

== Documentary ==
In 2018, Devika created the short film documentary Sarpatatwam or The Serpent Wisdom. She set the lyrics to music, choreographed and performed the dance, also serving as co-director and co-producer. The film was voted into the contention list of the Academy Awards in 2018. It premiered at the Prestige Theatres, LA and was also screened at various international theatres. It was also the opening film at the National Film Archive of India, Pune.

Her work Ahalya which was commissioned by Sampradaya Dance Company also opened to world premiere in May 2021. It was based on reflections in solitude done during COVID-19 lockdown and the music and dance being composed by herself. Her dance based short film ‘The Crossover’, that amalgamates Indian Sign Language with hastha mudras of Indian classical dance was screened at the Mumbai International Film Festival, 2024. A research article authored by her based on the above performance creation has also been published by Taylor and Francis.

== Filmography ==
Year	Title	Role	Notes	Ref
2024	Kadha Innuvare	M. S Lekshmi	Filmfare Award for Best Female Debut – South	
2025	Sarvam Maya	Annie	guest role	

== Awards ==
Devika's archival film was voted into the Academy Awards Contention List 2018. She won two national awards (Ustad Bismillah Yuva Puraskar for Mohiniyattam 2007 and the Devadasi Award from the Minister of Orissa in 2010). She received the state honours Kshetrakala Akademy Award 2020 and the Kerala Sangeetha Nataka Akademi Award 2011.

She received the Best Dancer Award of the Mid‐Year Fest from Madras Music Akademy in 2016. She is empanelled into SPIC‐MACAY (Society for the Promotion of Indian Classical Music and Culture Amongst Youth) in 2010. She is empanelled artiste for Mohiniyattam at the Indian Council for Cultural Relations. Her recent award was the Dakshinamurthy Puraskar which she received in 2022 along with Pandit Hariprasad Chaurasia and Sivamani. Devika is also the recipient of 'the Avanavan Kadamba award, 2023' by Kavalam Samskriti for her contribution to dance and theatre. She has received the award from Adoor Gopalakrishnan, the legendary film maker from Kerala.
