= Konthayum Poonoolum =

Konthayum Poonulum
- Movie poster
- Directed by: Jijo Antony
- Written by: Vinod Sreekumar
- Produced by: Royson Vellara
- Starring: Kunchacko Boban; Bhama; Manoj K Jayan; Satthya; Shine Tom Chacko
- Cinematography: Pappinu
- Edited by: Vijay Sankar
- Music by: Mejo Joseph
- Production companies: Relax Events; R.R. Entertainments
- Release date: 14 March 2014
- Running time: 118 minutes
- Country: India
- Language: Malayalam

Konthayum Poonulum is a 2014 Indian Malayalam-language family drama film directed by Jijo Antony (in his directorial debut). It stars Kunchako Boban, Bhama and Manoj K Jayan in the lead. The film presents multiple narrative lines.

== Plot ==
A baker named Krishnan rushes home to be with his heavily pregnant wife Amritha, who has been left home alone. Also at home is his dear friend Martin, who is jobless. Krishnan and Martin reconnect once Krishnan returns home.

A police officer named Mathachan, picks up a lady named Annie from the streets, but she suddenly disappears into thin air, making him fear she is supernatural, since earlier he has made fun of his wife's spiritual beliefs.

An old man named Freddy doesn't know whom to turn to when an accident leaves his daughter Alice and granddaughter in a critical state. A bunch of girls in a hostel decide try out a Ouija board, which sends one of them wandering into a cemetery in the dead of the night.

A money lender named Sethu, who has developed an imaginary, invisible friend called Johny, with whom he shares drinks, is shocked to find Johny following him one day. True to his character, Johny is invisible to everyone else, which sends Sethu into a delirium. An old time photographer named Aloshi's exploration of the supernatural leads him to the mortuary.

== Cast ==
- Kunchako Boban as Krishnan
- Bhama as Amrutha
- Shine Tom Chacko as Martin
- Kalabhavan Mani as Police officer Mathachan
- Kavitha Nair as Annie
- Janardhanan as Baby
- Satthya
- Anju Aravind as Alice
- Manoj K Jayan as Sethu
- Saiju Kurup as Jacob
- Joy Mathew as Aloshi
- Shobha Mohan as Mary
- Sarayu
- Poojitha Menon as Ann
- Poojappura Ravi as Ramettan
- Indrans as Hamsakka
- Sona Nair as Lathika, Sethu's wife
- Kundara Johny as Sandeep Mohan
- Narayanankutty as Rajappan, Photographer
- Kanakalatha as Nun
- T Parvathy as Lekha

== Reception ==
The Times of India gave the film 2 stars out of 5 and commented: "Despite the earnest attempt to churn out a riveting plot, the scenes suffer from a dreadful langour. Jiju lavishes disoriented, aimless scenes teeming with a confusing array of colours and light as if to enhance the intricacies of his plot. The act misfires as the film slumps into a drab barrage of sequences. The fluidity that flashed here and there vanishes forever." Lensmen, in a 3,5/5 stars review, stated: "Jijo Antony's direction has its flaws and pluses. The drama and cheesy feel in scenes could have been reduced in the making and there is no real control over the background score. Screenplay was written in a predictable way in the first half and after a point the second half also becomes slightly predictable. The story of the SLR photographer was finding it difficult to synchronize with the overall story. But as I said, there is this reasoning part in the second half which was a surprise and the haunting feel of the climax helps the movie in creating that much needed disturbance in the viewers mind. Pappinu's camera has captured some nice visuals but the quality of the camera was poor (especially those night sequences)."
