= Jijo Antony =

Indian filmmaker, writer and producer

- Born: Kollam, Kerala, India
- Occupation(s): Film director Film producer Screenwriter
- Years active: 2013–present
- Organization: Middle March Studios

Jijo Antony is an Indian film writer, director active since 2014 in Malayalam cinema.

== Career ==
Antony's directorial debut was Konthayum Poonoolum (2014) a comedy starring Kunchacko Boban. He later directed Darvinte Parinamam (2016) with Prithviraj Sukumaran, Pokkiri Simon (2017) with Sunny Wayne, and Adithattu, a seafaring adventure thriller that was released in 2022. Adithattu marked his second collaboration with Sunny Wayne, and it received the award for Best Second Film at the 53rd Kerala State Film Awards.

== Filmography ==
Year	Title	Language	Director	Writer	Producer	Notes
2014	Konthayum Poonoolum	Malayalam	Yes	Yes	No	Debut film
2016	Darvinte Parinamam	Malayalam	Yes	Yes	No	
2017	Pokkiri Simon	Malayalam	Yes	No	No	
2022	Adithattu	Malayalam	Yes	No	Yes	
2023	Paradise Circus	Malayalam	No	No	Yes	
