= Kaiyil Oru Kodi =

Indian television series

- Also known as: Kaiyil Oru Kodi - Are You Ready?
- Presented by: Rishi
- Composer: Marc Sylvan
- Country of origin: India
- Original language: Tamil
- No. of seasons: 1
- No. of episodes: 44

Production
- Running time: 90 minutes
- Production company: Endemol

Original release
- Network: Sun TV
- Release: 10 March – 28 October 2012

Kaiyil Oru Kodi, Are You Ready? (English: Ten Million in Your Hand, Are You Ready?) was a 2012 Indian game show presented on 10 March 2012 and 28 October 2012 on Sun TV in Tamil. It's the official Tamil adaptation of the original British format The Million Pound Drop. The show was hosted by Rishi.

== Game rules ==
There were seven questions. The game was composed of 50 bundles of ₹2 lakh, for a total of ₹1 crore. Contestants had to place all their money on the trapdoors for each question. Each question had a 60-second time limit. Question 1 to 3 had 4 possible answers, of which the contestants could only cover 3 trap doors. Questions 4, 5 and 6 had three possible answers, of which the contestants could only cover 2 trap doors. Question 7 had two possible answers, of which the contestants could only cover 1 trap door: an all-or-nothing chance. The contestants were always given a choice of 2 categories for each question.

Rishi did not touch the money; it was up to the contestants to move the money around, whether placing it on the trapdoors or removing it. The maximum time for debate before the 60-second clock started was at the discretion of the producers, but it was usually between 15 and 30 seconds. There was no electronic device to work out the amount of money on each trapdoor; this was up to Rishi.

== Reception ==
Sun TV received mention in the press for choosing to go with Rishi as the anchor as opposed to movie stars who were failing to hold TV audiences' attention.
