= Thakkol =

- Film poster
- Directed by: Kiron Prabhakaran
- Written by: Kiron Prabhakaran
- Produced by: Shaji Kailas; Mathew Joseph Thekkel
- Starring: Indrajith Sukumaran; Murali Gopy
- Cinematography: Alby Antony
- Edited by: Siyan Sreekanth
- Music by: M. Jayachandran
- Release date: 6 December 2019
- Running time: 150 minutes
- Country: India
- Language: Malayalam

Thakkol (transl. Key) is a 2019 Indian Malayalam-language thriller film directed by Kiron Prabhakaran and starring Indrajith Sukumaran and Murali Gopy. The film was in production for over a year. The lead cast had previously starred together in Ee Adutha Kaalathu (2012), Left Right Left (2013) and Tiyaan (2017). The film is produced by director Shaji Kailas. Sukumaran and Gopy play priests in the film. The film was predominantly shot in Goa.

== Cast ==
- Indrajith Sukumaran as Rector Fr. Ambrose Vas Pochampalli
- Murali Gopy as Monsignor Fr. Paily Mankunnath
- Ineya as Sarah
- Renji Panicker as Clement Kuzhimattathil aka Clement അപ്പാപ്പൻ
- Sudev Nair as Rector Fr. Silvester
- Meera Vasudevan as Jaceentha Morris Vas
- Nedumudi Venu as Thomas IPS(retd), Thomachayan
- Gilu Joseph as Clement's wife
- Thushara Pillai as Thomas's wife
- Nandhana Varma
- Lal as Metropolitan Archbishop
- Sudheer Karamana
- Rushin as young Fr. Ambrose
- Telly Sebastian as Germiyas
- Hani Mani as Guest appearance

== Release ==
=== Theatrical ===
The film released on 6 December 2019.

== Reception ==
The Times of India gave the film a rating of three out of five stars and stated that "The title of the movie itself is an example for that as the story speaks about one's key to wisdom and contentment in life". The New Indian Express gave the film the same rating and wrote that "Besides, the old-fashioned filmmaking approach, the slightly colour-drained images, and the mismatched background score make the film a bit of a chore to sit through".
