= Ananthan Kaadu =

2026 Indian drama film

- Theatrical release poster
- Directed by: Jiyen Krishnakumar
- Written by: Murali Gopy
- Produced by: Gokulam Gopalan; S Vinod Kumar
- Starring: Arya; Murali Gopy; Indrans; Sunil; Vijayaraghavan; Nikhila Vimal; Regena Cassandrra; Dev Mohan; Santhy Balachandran
- Cinematography: S. Yuva
- Edited by: Rohit V. S. Variyath
- Music by: B Ajaneesh Loknath
- Production companies: Sree Gokulam Movies; Mini Studios; The Show People
- Distributed by: Dream Big Films (Kerala)
- Release date: 25 June 2026
- Running time: 157 minutes
- Country: India
- Languages: Malayalam; Tamil

Ananthan Kaadu (transl. The Forest of Anantha; referring to the historical name of Thiruvananthapuram) is a 2026 Indian period political action thriller film written by Murali Gopy and directed by Jiyen Krishnakumar. Featuring dialogue in both Malayalam and Tamil, the film stars Arya in the lead role alongside an ensemble cast including Regena Cassandrra, Nikhila Vimal, Sunil, Indrans, and Dev Mohan. It is produced by S. Vinod Kumar under the Mini Studio banner and presented by Sree Gokulam Movies.

This movie was Arya's comeback in Malayalam after seven years. The film has received mixed reviews from critics and audience.

== Plot ==
Ananthan Kaadu unfolds in the late Eighties and early Nineties, a period when the country was experiencing a dark phase both politically and socially. It was a time when turmoil was evident throughout the nation's economic and political landscape.

The narrative shifts to the dingy, impoverished slums of a state capital, focusing on a mercenary foursome whose passion for music is second only to their will to lead a violent life. This dangerous lifestyle provides them with both the means to survive and unquestioned command over their politically ordained domains. The film dives deep into the double-edged power equations and socio-political maneuvers of the era, carving out rare, undocumented characters who played a crucial role in shaping the dramatic paradigm of a transformative period in the land's history.

== Cast ==
- Arya as Vetrivel Kumaran / Mani
- Murali Gopy as Thankaraj Ponnappan
- Dev Mohan as Murali
- Sunil as IG/DIG Sampath Rao IPS
- Indrans as Krishnankutty
- Appani Sarath as Jackson
- Nikhila Vimal as Deepa
- Regena Cassandrra as Priyamvada
- Vijayaraghavan as K.K Menon
- Bose Venkat as Thirupaachi
- Achyuth Kumar as Veerappa Perumal Mudaliyar
- Ajay as Sri Lankan Commander
- Santhy Balachandran as Karthi
- Sabumon Abdusamad as SI Sathyachandran
- Irshad Ali as P.K Abraham
- Sagar Surya as Podiyan Ananthan
- Anjali Nair as Chandrika
- Sreelatha Namboothiri as Radha
- Kalaranjini as Parvathy Amma
- Jain Paul as SI Baburaj
- Janani Durgaa as Selvi
- Janaki Suresh as Periyanayaki

== Production ==
=== Development ===
The film was announced as a major big-budget venture representing the second collaboration between director Jiyen Krishnakumar and writer Murali Gopy after Tiyaan (2017). Written by acclaimed screenwriter Murali Gopy (known for Lucifer and its sequel Empuraan), the narrative weaves historical socio-political transitions with core commercial action elements. The project is produced by Mini Studio, marking their 14th production venture following the commercial success of Mark Antony (2023).

=== Filming ===
Tamil actor Arya was cast in the central lead role, portraying a rugged, leading a rebellion within the plot's volatile ecosystem. A massive ensemble cross-industry cast was pulled together, bringing in notable actors from the Malayalam, Tamil, Telugu, and Kannada film industries. Principal photography took place across various locations designed to replicate the late-80s and early-90s cityscape and impoverished urban sectors.

== Music ==
The film's original score and songs are composed by B. Ajaneesh Loknath, marking his official debut in Malayalam cinema. The lyrics for the tracks were penned by Nishanth Raju and Murali Gopy. A promotional tracking song titled "Vedicha Theeyaal", written and sung by screenwriter Murali Gopy himself, was recorded for the film.

== Release ==
On June 4, 2026, the makers confirmed that Ananthan Kaadu is scheduled to hit screens worldwide on June 25, 2026. The film will be distributed by Big Dreams Films.

=== Streaming rights ===
The Movie is slated to release on both ManoramaMAX, Lionsgate Play, Amazon Prime Video, Simply South and AP International South Cinema as ManoramaMAX released this movie on 2 September 2026 and Simply South, Lionsgate Play, Amazon Prime Video and AP International South Cinema also slated to release on 4 September 2026.

== Reception ==
Manorama Online describes Ananthan Kaadu as a visually striking, politically charged thriller featuring strong performances from Arya, Indrans, and Murali Gopy. While praised for its technical aspects, the film is noted for a conventional revenge narrative that is occasionally weighed down by excessive subplots.

According to the Mathrubhumi review, Ananthan Kaadu is a gritty, period revenge thriller that effectively uses the metaphor of an untamed jungle to explore themes of power, oppression, and raw survival. Written by Murali Gopy and directed by Jiyen Krishnakumar, the film is praised for its strong critique of political exploitation and powerful performances from the cast.

Overall, Ananthan Kaadu is a sincere political action drama that combines strong performances, quality technical work, and an interesting backdrop. It offers a mix of action, emotion, and political intrigue that should appeal to fans of the genre. While it remains rooted in familiar storytelling territory, the film succeeds in delivering a reasonably engaging theatrical experience.

Anandu Suresh from Indian Express gave 1/5 stars and wrote "Jiyen Krishnakumar's action drama tries hard, but Murali Gopy's text-heavy, pretentious screenplay strips the film of any real soul." S.R. Praveen of The Hindu wrote "Ananthan Kaadu movie review: A flat, old-fashioned political potboiler lacking novelty."
