= Asiavision Awards =

Annual film and television awards

The Asiavision Awards have been held annually since 2006 to honor the artists and technicians of Indian cinema and television, and is organized under the leadership of renowned journalist Nissar Syed.

More than 40,000 people across United Arab Emirates attended the 2012 Movie awards which was held on 9 November 2012 at Sharjah Cricket Stadium. Mohanlal and Rima Kallingal won Best Actors and Juhi Chawla and Shruti Haasan won excellence awards. In 2013 Asiavision Movie Awards was held at Dubai festival city, where Mammootty won Best Actor for Kunjananthante kada and Kavya Madhavan won best actress for Bavuttiyude Namathil. Bollywood actor John Abraham won Icon of the year and Rani Mukerji won excellence in Hindi cinema for Talaash and Bombay talkies. Preity Zinta won Pride of Bollywood award and Karisma Kapoor was one among the chief guests. In 2009, the first edition of Asiavision Television Awards started at Sharjah cricket stadium where Oscar Award winner Resul Pookutty attended as chief guest. The 4th and 5th edition of Television Awards witnessed the presence of Mohanlal and Karisma Kapoor along with the television celebrities of Malayalam television industry. On February 8, 2017, the first edition of Asiavision Radio Awards was launched, where leading Malayalam radio stations representatives were honored. Kareena Kapoor was awarded with Icon of India. On November 14, 2014 9th Edition of Asiavision Movie Awards held at Sharjah cricket stadium and Aishwarya Rai Bachchan was honored with Icon Of India Dhanush was presented Youth Icon of India male and Shruti Haasan was given Youth Icon of India female. Best actor award was won by Mammootty for his outstanding performance in the movie Munnariyippu and Best actress award was won by Manju Warrier for her come back movie How old are you Asiavision movie awards 2015 was held at Sharjah cricket stadium on 2 December where Prithviraj Sukumaran and Parvathy Thiruvothu were honored with Best actors award for their excellent performance in the movie Ennu Ninte Moideen, which also won best film award. Bollywood actors Jackie Shroff and Tabu won Outstanding Performance award and Imran Khan was presented with Youth Icon of India award. On 18 November 2016, the 11th edition of Asiavision Film Awards was held at Sharjah cricket stadium, and the leading stars from Malayalam, Tamil, Telugu and Hindi were present. Sonam Kapoor was awarded with best actress-national for her excellent performance in the movie Neerja. Radhika Apte won Outstanding Performer Of The Year and Amy Jackson won Excellence in Indian Cinema award. Tamannaah Bhatia and Vijay Sethupathi won Best Actor Female and Male Tamil awards respectively for Dharma Durai. In 2017 the movie awards was held at Sharjah cricket stadium and Deepika Padukone was honored with Global Icon of India and Sanjay Dutt was awarded with Most Popular Actor of The Year.

== Winners 2011 ==
Category	Winner	Movie
Lifetime achievement	K. J. Yesudas	Various songs
Most Influential Malayali	Mohanlal	35 years of Indian Cinema
Best Film; Best family movie	Salt N' Pepper	Aashiq Abu
Best Director	Salim Ahmed	Adaminte Makan Abu
Best Actor	Salim Kumar	Adaminte Makan Abu
Best Actress	Genelia D'Souza	Urumi
Best second actor	Anoop Menon	Traffic, Pranayam, Cocktail
Best Second actress	Shweta Menon	Salt N' Pepper
Best Supporting actor	Jayasurya	cockatail
Best Supporting actress	Samvrutha Sunil	Manikyakallu, cocktail
Best comedian	Baburaj	salt pepper
New sensation in acting	Ayila Nair	sandwich, Dr.love, Seniors
Special jury	Biju Menon; Rahaman; Mythili	Marykkundoru Kunjaadu; Traffic (2011 film); Salt N' Pepper
Best character actor	Thilakan	Indian Rupee (film), Adaminte Makan Abu
Best promising newcomer	Unni Mukundan	Bombay March 12
Outstanding performance	Jaya Prada; Anupam Kher; Prabhu Deva	Pranayam; Pranayam; Urumi
Outstanding movie	Adaminte Makan Abu	Salim Ahmed
Socially committed movie	Indian Rupee (film)	Renjit
Artistic movie	Pranayam	Blessy
Popular film	Traffic (2011 film)	Rajesh Pillai
Best Screenplay	Bobby Sanjay	Traffic (2011 film)
Best Music director	Bijibal	salt and pepper
Best Playback singer	Vijay Yesudas; Shreya Ghoshal	Indian rupee Veeraputhran
Best Lyricist	Rafeeq Ahammed	Veeraputhran
Antihero	Jagathy Sreekumar	Urumi
excellence in music	M. G. Sreekumar	Various songs
excellence in Tamil	AR Murugadoss	7 Aum Arivu
excellence in Hindi	Sidhiq	Bodyguard
Trendsetter	Listin Stephen	Traffic

== Winners 2012 ==
Category	Winner	Movie
Best actor	Mohanlal	Spirit / Grand Master Run baby run
Excellence in Hindi	Juhi Chawla	I Am (2010 Indian film)
excellence in Hindi	Onir	I Am (2010 Indian film)
excellence in Tamil	Shruti Haasan	moonu
best director	Ranjith	Spirit
best screen play	Iqbal Kuttipuram	Diamond Necklace
new promising in script	Murali Gopy	Ee adutha kalathu
best movie	Diamond Necklace	Lal jose
socially committed movie	Spirit	Ranjith
artistic movie	Manjadikkuru	Anjali Menon
family movie	Ustad Hotel	Anwar Rasheed
outstanding movie	Ee adutha Kaalathu	Arun K Aravind
most sensational movie	22 Female Kottayam	Aashiq Abu
popular movie	Thattathin Marayathu	Vineeth Sreenivasan
Special jury award	Ozhimuri	Madhupal
best lyricst	Shibu Chakravarthy	Arike
best music director	Shaan Rahmaan	Thattathin Marayathu
singer - male	Unni Menon	Mazhaneer (Beautiful)
singer - female	Shreya Ghoshal	Bachelor party (Nidra/Mallu Singh)
new sensation in singing - male	Mohanlal-	Run baby run
new sensation in singing - female	Remya Nambeesan	Ivan Megharoopan, Thattathin
new promising in singing - male	Kabeer	Vellaripravinte Changathi
new promising in singing - female	Anna Katharina	Ee Adutha Kalathu, Ustad Hotel
best actress	Rima kallingal	22 Female Kottayam/Nidra
second best actor	Jayasurya	Beautiful (2011 film)/Trivandrum Lodge
second best actress	Revathy	Molly Aunty Rocks
performer of the year	Fahad Faasil	22 Female Kottayam/Diamond Necklace
character actor	Thilakan	Ustad Hotel
new sensation in acting	Nivin Pauly	Thattathin Marayathu
new sensation in acting female	Isha Talwar	Thattathin Marayathu
new promise in acting	Gautami	Second Show/Diamond Necklace
anti - hero	Murali Gopy	Ee adutha kalathu
best comedian	Aju Varghese	Thattathin Marayathu
best actor in supporting role	Mamukkoya	Molly Aunty Rocks/Vellaripravinte Changathi
best actress in supporting role	Anusri	Diamond Necklace
outstanding performance	Indrajith	Ee Adutha Kaalathu
outstanding performance	Lal	Ozhimuri
outstanding performance	Srinivasan	Thattathin Marayathu
outstanding performance	Khushboo	Mr. Marumakan
man of the year	Vineeth Sreenivasan	Thattathin Marayathu
trendsetter	Anoop Menon	Beautiful
best cinematographer	Jomon T. John	Thattathin Marayathu
best editor	Arun K Aravind	Ee adutha kalathu
special award	Rahman	Manjadikuru

== Winners 2013 ==
Category	Winner	Movie
Life Time Achievement	M.S.Vishwanathan	Contributing since 1945 to till dated in music industry
Best Film	Celluloid	Kamal
Best Director	Kamal	Celluloid
Best Actor	Mammootty	Kunjananthante Kada, Daivathinte Swantham Cleetus
Best Actress	Kavya Madhavan	Bavuttiyude Namathil
Second Best Actor	Biju Menon	Kalimannu, Romans
Man Of The Year	Prithviraj	Ayalum Njanum Thammil, Celluloid, Mumbai Police, Memories
Youth Icon	Nivin Pauly	Neram
Outstanding Performer of The Year	Indrajith Sukumaran	Left Right Left/Amenn
Outstanding Performance -female	Shwetha Menon	Kalimannu
Best Supporting Actor	Vineeth	Bavuttiyude Namathil
Best supporting Actress	Sajitha Madathil	Shutter
Best Comedian	Suraj Venjaramoodu	Pullipulikalum Aattinkuttiyum/Daivathinte Swantham Cleetus
Best Anti Hero	Joy Mathew	Amen
New Sensation in Acting	Nazriya Nazim	Neram/Raja Rani/Neyyandi
Best Debut in Acting	Nyla Usha	Kunjananthante Kada
Aristic Movie	Ayalum Njanum Thammil	Lal Jose
Socially committed Movie	Kunjananthante Kada	Salim Ahamed
Outstanding Movie	Mumbai Police	Rosshan Andrrews
Best Debut Director	Joy Mathew	Shutter
Best Music Director	M.Jayachandran	Celluloid
Best Lyricist	Kavalam Narayana Panicker	Athmavin-Amen
Best Singer Male	Vijay Yesudas	Thirayum-Memories
Best Singer Female	K.S.Chithra	Ilaveyil-Artist
New Sensation in Singing	Murali Gopy	Left Right Left Anthem-Left Right Left
Best Screenplay	Murali Gopy	Left Right Left
Best Cinematography	Madhu Ambat	Kunjananthante Kada
Best Sound Mixing	Resul pookutty	Kunjananthante Kada
Special Jury Award	Left Right Left	
Most Promising Actor	Krish J. Sathaar	Ladies&Gentleman
Excellence In Tamil Cinema	R.Madhavan	Vettai
Excellence In Tamil Cinema	Kajal Aggarwal	Thuppakki
Excellence In Hindi Cinema	Rani Mukerji	Talaash, Bombay Talkies
Pride of Bollywood	Preity Zinta	
Icon of the Year	John Abraham (actor)	Madras Cafe

== Winners 2014 ==
Category	Winner	Movie
Life Time Achievement		
Best Film	How Old are you	Rosshan Andrrews
Best Director	Renjith	Njaan
Youth Icon Of India	Ram Charan	
Best Actor	Mammootty	Varsham, Munnariyippu
Best Actress	Manju Warrier	How Old are you
Second Best Actor	Siddique (actor)	Drishyam
Second Best Actor	Asha Sarath	Drishyam
Man Of The Year	Innocent	Aamayum Muyalum, Mannar Mathai Speaking 2
Performer of The Year - Male	Dulquer Salmaan	Bangalore Days and Vikramadithyan
Star of The Year - Male	Nivin Pauly	Bangalore Days and 1983 (film)
Star of the Year - Female	Nazriya Nazim	Bangalore Days
Best Supporting Actor	Aju Varghese	Various films
Best supporting Actress	Sethulakshmi	How Old Are You? (film)
Artistic Movie	Swapaanam	Shaji N. Karun
Socially committed Movie	Tira	Vineeth Sreenivasan
Outstanding Movie	Munnariyippu	Venu
Popular Movie	Drishyam	Jeethu Joseph
Entertaining Movie	Bangalore Days	Anjali Menon
Best Debut Director	Abrid Shine	1983 (film)
Best Music Director	Gopi Sunder	Bangalore Days, 1983 (film)
Best Lyricist	Harinarayan	
Best Singer Male	Shankar Mahadevan	Pullipulikalum Aattinkuttiyum
Best Singer Female	Vani Jayaram	1983 (film)
New Sensation in acting	Parvathy Thiruvothu	Bangalore Days
New Sensation in singing	Najim Arshad	Bhaiyya Bhaiyya, Mylanchi Monchulla Veedu
Best Screenplay	Renjith	Njaan
Best Cinematography	Sameer Thahir	Bangalore Days
Best Sound Mixing	Bijibal	Varsham, Munnariyippu
Special Jury Award	Jayasurya	Apothecary (film)
Special performance and 30 years of excellence	Jayaram	Swapaanam
Excellence In Tamil Cinema	Vijay, Vishal	Kaththi, Poojai
Excellence In Tamil Cinema	Sruthi Haasan	Yevadu, Poojai
Excellence In Hindi Cinema	Kajol	
Pride of India	Santosh Sivan	Inam
Icon of the Year	Aishwarya Rai; Kareena Kapoor	

== Winners 2015 ==
Category	Winner	Movie's
Lifetime Achievement Award	K. J. Yesudas; Nedumudi Venu; KG George	Singer; Actor; Director
Best Movie	Ennu Ninte Moideen	Director-RS Vimal
Best Movie on Social Welfare	Pathemari	Director-Salim Ahamed
Best Movie With Artistic Values	Oral Pokkam	Director-Sanalkumar Sasidharan
Best Critically Acclaimed Movie	Pathemari	Director-Salim Ahamed
Best Popular Movie	Premam	Director-Alphonse Puthren
Best Entertainer Of The Year	Amar Akbar Anthony	Director-Nadhirshah
Best Actor	Prithviraj Sukumaran	Ennu Ninte Moideen, Ivide, Picket 43
Best Actress	Parvathy	Ennu Ninte Moideen
Best Director	RS Vimal	Ennu Ninte Moideen
Man Of The Year	Nivin Pauly	
Outstanding Performer Of The Year	Amala Paul	Mili
Best Actor In A Supporting Role	Tovino Thomas	Ennu Ninte Moideen
Best Actor In A Character Role	Aju Varghese	(Various Films)
Best Actor In A Comic Role	Chemban Vinod Jose	(Various Films)
Sensational Actors Of The Year	Sai Pallavi; Neeraj Madhav	Premam (Various Films)
Special Performance Award	Reenu Mathews	Lord Livingstone 7000 Kandi
Best Debutante Director	G Prajith	Oru Vadakkan Selfie
Best New Face	Jewel Mary	Utopiayile Rajavu, Pathemari
Best Cinematography	Jomon T John	Ennu Ninte Moideen
Best Screenplay: RS Vimal	Ennu Ninte Moideen)	
Best Music Director	Bijibal	Kaliyachan, Pathemari
Best Popular Music Director	Gopi Sundar	(Various Films)
Best Background Score	Gopi Sundar	Ennu Ninte Moideen
Best Singer (Male)	Vineeth Sreenivasan	(Aluva Puzha-Premam)
Best Singer (Female)	Sujatha Mohan	(Mamboo Pozhikkunna-Ottamandaram)
New Sensations In Singing	Maqbool Mansoor; Harisankar	(Mukkathe Penne-Ennu Ninte Moideen) (Nilavum-Ennum Eppozhum)

== Winners 2016 ==
Regional languages

- Best Actress – Sonam Kapoor- Neerja
- Outstanding Performer – Radhika Apte- Parched/ Kabali
- Youth Icon – Ram Charan
- Best Actor in Tamil – Vijay Sethupathi- Dharma Durai
- Best Actress in Tamil – Tamannaah Bhatia- Dharma Durai
- Best Actor in Negative Role – RK Suresh- Thara Thappatai
- Best Film in Tamil – Dharma Durai
- Excellence Award – Amy Jackson- Ai, Theri
- Best Director in Tamil – Seenu Ramasamy - Dharma Durai
- Best Singer in Tamil – Sid Sriram
- Star of the year – Shaheer Sheikh

Category	Winner	Movie's
Popular Actor of the Year	Mohanlal	Oppam/ Pulimurugan
Best Actor	Nivin Pauly –	Action Hero Biju/Jacobinte Swargarajyam
Best Actress	Manju Warrier	Vettah /Karinkunnam 6s
Popular Movie	Pulimurugan	Vaisakh
Second Best Actor	Manikandan Achari	Kammatipaadam
Best Supporting Actor	Aju Varghese	Ann Mariya Kalippilaanu
Outstanding Performance of the Year	Tovino Thomas; Vedhicka	Guppy; James & Alice
Excellence Award	Asha Sharath	Pavada/ Anuraga Karikkin Vellam
Best Character Actor	Renji Panicker	Jacobinte Swargarajyam
New Sensation in Action Male	Shane Nigam	Kismat
New Sensation in Action Female	Aparna Balamurali	Maheshinte Prathikaram
Best Anti Hero	Kabir Bedi	Anarkali/ Mohenjodaro- Hindi
Best Music Director	Gopi Sunder	Charlie/ Kali/ Pulimurugan
Best Lyricist	Harinarayan	Minugum (Oppam)
Best Singer Male	MG Sreekumar-	Chinnamma(Oppam)
Best Singer Female	KS Chitra	
Life Time Achievement	MK Arjunan	Music Director
New Promise in Acting Male	Gokul Suresh	Mudhugauv
New Promise in Acting Female	Rejisha Vijayan	Anuragakarikkinvellam
Special Jury Award	Rajeev Pillai; Sijoy Varghese	Muthashi Gadha; James and Alice
Man of the Year	Kunchako Boban	
Best Film	Jacobinte Swargarajyam	Vineeth Sreenivasan
Best Director	Priyadarshan	I plan
New Sensation in Singing	Baby Sreya	
Best Cinematographer	Shaji	
Child Artist	Baby Nainika	Theri

== Winners 2017 ==
12th Asiavision Movie Awards 2017 held on November 24, 2017 at Sharjah Cricket Stadium in the United Arab Emirates.

Category	Winner	Movie
Best Film	Dileesh Pothan	Thondimuthalum Driksakshiyum
Best Director	Mahesh Narayan	Take Off
Best Actor - Hindi	Ayushmann Khurrana	Meri Pyaari Bindu, Bareilly Ki Barfi & Shubh Mangal Saavdhan
Best Actor - Malayalam	Dulquer Salmaan	Solo, Parava, CIA & Jomonte Suvisheshangal
Best Actress - Hindi	Bhumi Pednekar	Toilet: Ek Prem Katha & Shubh Mangal Saavdhan
Best Actress - Malayalam	Manju Warrier	Udaharanam Sujatha
Best Actress - Tamil	Aditi Rao Hydari	Kaatru Veliyidai
Best Music Director - Hindi	Mithoon	Shab
Best Music Director - Malayalam	Gopi Sunder	The Great Father & Take Off
Best Singer - Male	Karthik	"Ee Kaattu Vannu" from Adam Joan
Best Singer - Female	Sithara Krishnakumar	"Ethu Mazhaylum" from Udaharanam Sujatha
Best Lyricist	Harinarayanan	"Ee Kaattu from" Adam Joan "Lailakame" from Ezra
Best Actor in Comedy Role	Dharmajan Bolgatty	Sunday Holiday & Chunkzz
Best Artistic Movies		Parava & Kaattu
Best Debut Director	Soubin Shahir	Parava
Best Debut Actor - Malayalam	Antony Varghese	Angamaly Diaries
Best Debut Actor - Hindi	Ashish Bisht	Shab
Outstanding Performer (National)	Aishwarya Rajesh	Sakhavu & Jomonte Suvisheshangal
Outstanding performer of the year - Male	Suraj Venjarumoodu	Thondimuthalum Driksakshiyum
Outstanding performer of the year - Female	Shanthi Krishna	Njandukalude Nattil Oridavela
Outstanding performer of the year	Kunal Kapoor	Veeram
Excellence in Malayalam Cinema	Asha Sarath	Viswasapoorvam Mansoor
Excellence in Singing	Abhaya Hiranmayi	"Koyikkode" song from Goodalochana
Popular Music Director/Best Background Score	Shaan Rahman	Velipadinte Pusthakam & Godha
Popular Singer of the Year	Vineeth Sreenivasan	Entammede Jimikki Kammal from Velipadinte Pusthakam
New Sensation in Acting (male)	Sarath Kumar	Angamaly Diaries & Velipadinte Pusthakam
New Sensation in Acting (female)	Anu Sithara	Ramante Edanthottam
New Sensation in Singing (male)	Vaishnav Girish	
New Sensation in Singing (female)	Ann Amie	"Kilivaathilil" from Pullikkaran Staraa
New Sensation in Singing	Sanah Moidutty	Afeemi song from Meri Pyaari Bindu
Man of the Year (Malayalam)	Tovino Thomas	Godha & Oru Mexican Aparatha
Most Popular Actor	Sanjay Dutt	Bhoomi
Hero of the Decade	Vijay Sethupathi	
Global Icon of India	Deepika Padukone	
Gurushreshta Puraskaram	MT Vasudevan Nair	
Socially Committed movie		Take Off
Pride of South India	Mamta Mohandas	

== Winners 2018 ==
13th Asiavision Movie Awards for 2018, which was held in Dubai on 16 February 2019.

Category	Winner	Movie
Best Film	Zakariya Mohammed	Sudani from Nigeria
Best Director	Lijo Jose Pellissery	Ee.Ma.Yau.
Best Actor - Hindi	Ranveer Singh	Padmaavat
Best Actor - Malayalam	Tovino Thomas	Maradona, Theevandi, Oru Kuprasidha Payyan
Best Actor - Tamil	Vijay Sethupathi	Vikram Vedha
Best Actress - Malayalam	Manju Warrier	Aami
Best Actor (Critics) - Tamil	Dhanush	Vada Chennai, Maari 2
Best Actor (Critics) - Hindi	Ayushmann Khurrana	Badhaai Ho, Andhadhun
Best Actor (Negative Role)	Jim Sarbh	Padmaavat
Best Debut Actor - Male	Nikesh Ram	Mazhayathu
Best Debut Actress - Female	Saniya Iyappan	Queen (2018 film) & Pretham 2
Best Performer - Tamil	Sadhna Venkatesh	Peranbu
Best Music Director	Kailas Menon	Theevandi
Best Background Score	Gopi Sundar	Kayamkulam Kochunni
Best Singer - Male	K. S. Harisankar	
Best Singer - Female	Shreya Ghoshal	
Best Lyricist	B.K.Harinarayanan	Theevandi
Star of the Year - Male	Joju George	Joseph
Star of the Year - Female	Aishwarya Lekshmi	Varathan
Promising Actor	Krrish Menon	Kinavalli
Promising Director in family entertainment	Ramesh Pisharody	Panchavarnathatha
Outstanding performer of the year	Asha Sharath	Bhayanakam
Popular Movie of the year	Rosshan Andrrews	Kayamkulam Kochunni
Youth ICON award	Antony Varghese	Swathanthryam Ardharathriyil
New Sensation in Singing - Female	Prarthana Indrajith and Shashaa Tirupati	
Emerging Star of the Year	Kiara Advani	
Best Actress of the Decade	Trisha	
Honoring 30 years in Music	Sharreth	
Life Time Achievement	Sri Shyam	
Best Actor (Television) - Hindi	Nakuul Mehta	Ishqbaaz
Best Actress (Television) - Hindi	Erica Fernandes and Shivangi Joshi	Kasautii Zindagii Kay & Yeh Rishta Kya Kehlata Hai
