= Arun Kumar Aravind =

Indian film director, editor and producer

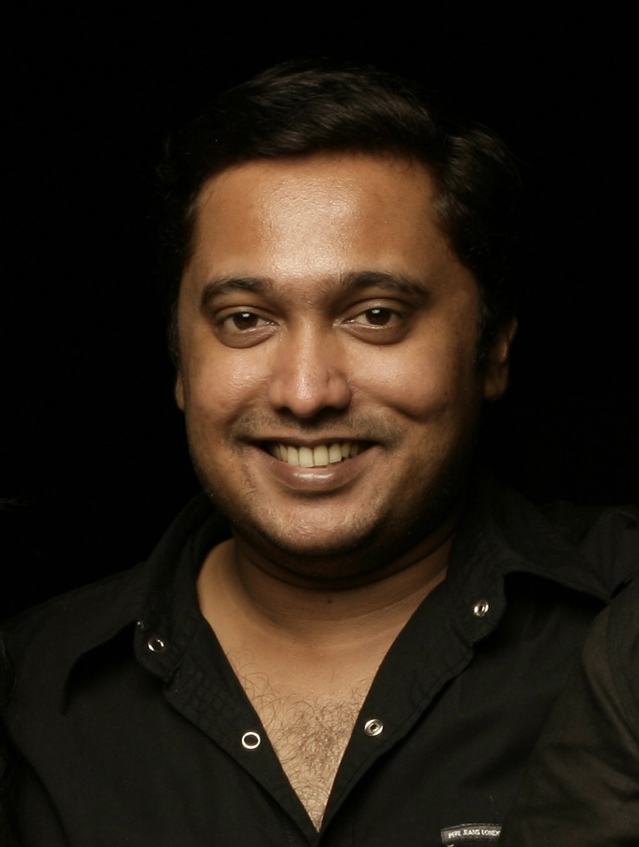
- Born: 22 May 1977 (age 49); Thiruvananthapuram, Kerala, India
- Occupations: Film director; editor; producer
- Years active: 2003–present
- Children: 1

Arun Kumar Aravind is an Indian film director, editor and producer who works predominantly in Malayalam cinema.

== Biography ==
Arun Kumar Aravind, was better known as the editor of director Priyadarshan, owns to his credit a span of 10 years' experience as a film editor. Arun, who hails from Thiruvananthapuram, had done his schooling in St. Thomas Residential School, graduated from M.G. College, Thiruvananthapuram with a B.SC in Physics and later moved to Chennai to master Visual Effects from Pentamedia Graphics. He started his career as visual effect artist with Pentamedia.

Arun Kumar Aravind has been director Priyadarshan's, principal editor from Vettam (2004) onwards before he turned to filmmaking with Cocktail. He edited Priyadarshan's Tamil film Kanchivaram which got National Film Award for the Best Film in 2008. He had also worked with other well- known directors like T. K. Rajeev Kumar, Shaji Kailas, Suresh Krishna.

Arun was nominated for Shantharam Award and National Award for best editing (Kancheevaram). Arun is the winner of 2011 Asianet Ujala Film Award & Mathrubhumi-Kalyan Film Award for the Best Editor.

== Family ==
He has a daughter, Arsha Nayar.

== Awards ==
- 2013 – Asiavision Awards – Special Jury Award
- 2012 – IFFK - NETPAC Award for Best Malayalam Film – Ee Adutha Kalathu

== Filmography ==
=== Director ===
Year	Title	Cast	Language	Screenplay	Notes
2010	Cocktail	Jayasurya, Anoop Menon, Samvrutha Sunil	Malayalam	Anoop Menon	
2012	Ee Adutha Kaalathu	Indrajith Sukumaran, Murali Gopy, Anoop Menon	Malayalam	Murali Gopy	Asianet Film Awards for Best Editor; Asiavision Awards for Best Editor; IFFK 2012 – NETPAC Award for Best Malayalam Film
2013	Left Right Left	Indrajith Sukumaran, Murali Gopy, Lena	Malayalam	Murali Gopy	Asiavision Awards Special Jury Award for Outstanding Movie; Asiavision Awards for Best Editor
2014	1 by Two	Fahadh Faasil, Murali Gopy, Honey Rose	Malayalam	Jayamohan	
2017	Kaattu	Asif Ali, Murali Gopy, Varalaxmi Sharathkumar	Malayalam	Ananthapadmanabhan	
2019	Under World	Asif Ali, Farhaan Faasil, Mukesh	Malayalam	Shibin Francis	

=== Producer ===
Year	Title	Notes
2013	Vedivazhipadu	
2017	Kaattu	

=== Editor ===
Year	Title	Director	Language
2003	Vasanthamalika	Suresh Krishnan	Malayalam
2003	Ivar	T.K. Rajeev Kumar	Malayalam
2004	Vettam	Priyadarshan	Malayalam
2004	Hulchul	Priyadarshan	Hindi
2005	Garam Masala	Priyadarshan	Hindi
2004	Kyon Ki	Priyadarshan	Hindi
2006	Chup Chup Ke	Priyadarshan	Hindi
2005	Bhagam Bhag	Priyadarshan	Hindi
2006	Dhol	Priyadarshan	Hindi
2007	Bhool Bhulaiyaa	Priyadarshan	Hindi
2007	Malabar Wedding	Rajesh Faisal	Malayalam
2007	Sound of Boot	Shaji Kailas	Malayalam
2008	Mere Baap Pehle Aap	Priyadarshan	Hindi
2009	Kanchivaram	Priyadarshan	Tamil
2009	Winter	Dipu Karunakaran	Malayalam
2009	Seetha Kalyanam	T.K. Rajeev Kumar	Malayalam
2010	Chal Chala Chal	T.K. Rajeev Kumar	Hindi
2009	Billu	Priyadarshan	Hindi
2009	De Dana Dan	Priyadarshan	Hindi
2010	Bumm Bumm Bole	Priyadarshan	Hindi
2010	Khatta Meetha	Priyadarshan	Hindi
2010	Cocktail	Himself	Malayalam
2010	Pathinonnil Vyazham	Suresh Krishnan	Malayalam
2010	Aakrosh	Priyadarshan	Hindi
2012	Ee Adutha Kaalathu	Himself	Malayalam
2013	Left Right Left	Himself	Malayalam
