= One by Two =

One by Two may refer to these Indian films:

- One by Two (1993 film) in the Telugu-language
- One by Two (2014 film) in the Hindi-language by Devika Bhagat
- 1 by Two, a 2014 Malayalam-language film by Arun Kumar
