= Murali Gopy =

Indian actor

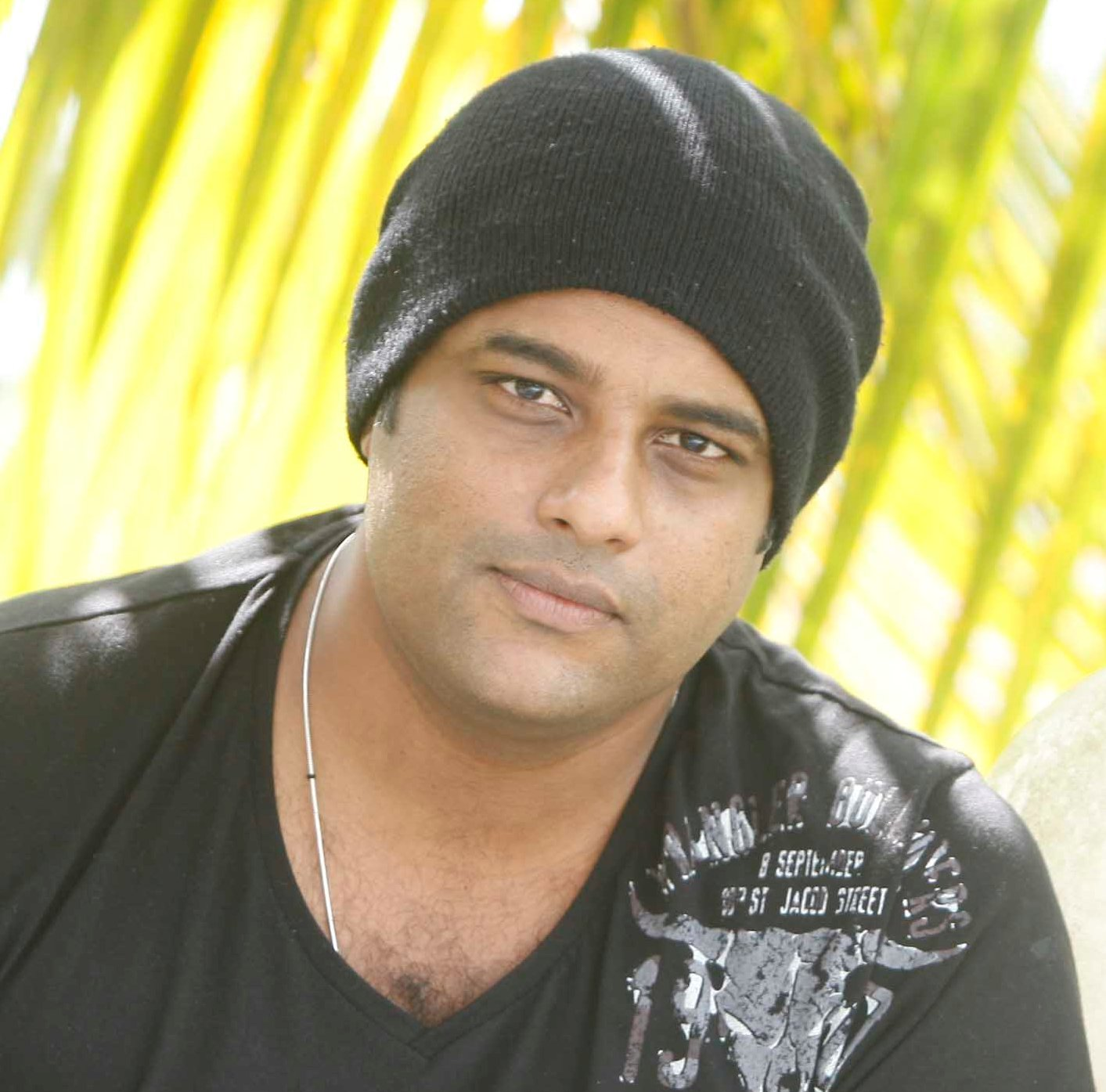
- Murali in 2012
- Born: Muralikrishnan Gopynathan Nair; 4 March 1972 (age 54); Thiruvananthapuram, Kerala, India
- Occupations: Actor; screenwriter; journalist; singer; author; lyricist; music composer
- Years active: 2004–present
- Spouse: Anjana Pillai (m. 1999; died 2015)
- Children: 2
- Father: Bharat Gopy
- Website: mgvanguard.blogspot.in

Muralikrishnan Gopynathan Nair, professionally credited as Murali Gopy, is an Indian actor, screenwriter, playback singer, lyricist, journalist, author, and music composer who works in Malayalam films. He has written films such as Ee Adutha Kaalathu, Left Right Left, Tiyaan, Kammara Sambhavam, Lucifer, L2: Empuraan. He has won numerous awards including the Filmfare Awards and South Indian International Movie Awards.

== Career ==
=== As journalist ===
Murali Gopy joined The New Indian Express in 1995, immediately after completing PG in Journalism at Institute of Journalism, Thiruvananthapuram, and worked as sub-editor and reporter there. Later, he joined The Hindu, as sub-editor and Features Editor. He then shifted base to UAE, and became chief sub-editor with Arab-Allied Media, Dubai, for the sports magazines Cleanbowled and Sports Today. In 2008, he was appointed chief editor of MSN India Entertainment. In 2012, he resigned the job to be more active in films. His writings on various topics can be found in his blog mgvanguard.blogspot.in.

=== As author ===
Murali is a screenwriter and short story writer. He published his first short story "Ayur Rekha" in Kalakaumudi in 1991 at the age of 19. He has stated that he started writing stories to bring a smile to his father, thespian Bharat Gopy, who was debilitated by a massive stroke in 1986. Murali Gopiyude Kadhakal, a compilation of his stories, has been published by Mathrubhumi Books, the third edition of which is now running. His Novella Psychotic Daivam, Psychedelic Swargam, Psychiatric Manushyan was published by DC Books. He has also sketched illustrations for The Hindu, Kalakaumudi and DC Books.

=== As screenwriter ===
Murali Gopy made his debut as a screenwriter, actor and singer in the Lal Jose movie Rasikan (2004). The 2012 film Ee Adutha Kaalathu, scripted by Murali, is considered a pathbreaker in Malayalam cinema, for its innovative method of weaving story threads together. It was opined to be "the cinema of 21st century" by stalwart writer N. S. Madhavan. His next screenplay was for Left Right Left, also directed by Arun Kumar Aravind. It is a social thriller set in three periods – the 60s/70s, the 80s/90s and the present. The movie, which opened to excellent reviews on its release, has since then been looked upon as a cult classic. The 2017 movie Tiyaan, written by him was noted for its bold theme that focused on the current socio-political scenario in India. Kammara Sambhavam, scripted by him, combines black humour with satire and spoof. He scripted Lucifer, starring Mohanlal, and directed by Prithviraj Sukumaran which received extra positive reports and went on to become one of the quintessential blockbusters of Malayalam Cinema, balancing content and entertainment. His script Theerppu is note-worthy as an allegorical depiction of majoritarianism. The year 2025 marks the release of Ananthan Kaadu, a Tamil-Malayalam bilingual film penned by him, following the huge commercial success of L2: Empuraan which was the second installment of Lucifer.

=== As actor ===
Murali's debut acting role in Rasikan was as the villain Kala Bhaskaran. He returned on-screen as Dr. Alex Verghese in Bhramaram. His notable performances include the role of Ajay Kurien, an impotent and abusive husband in Ee Adutha Kaalathu, Che Guevara Roy, a partially paralyzed left activist in Left Right Left, Father Michael Plathottathil a young priest in Kanyaka Talkies, the double role as Dr.Hari Narayan and Ravi Narayan in the psychological thriller 1 by Two, the die-hard romantic Siddharth in Lukka Chuppi, Devassy Pappan, an 80-year-old patriarch in Pa Va, Mahashay Bhagvan, a self-proclaimed Godman in Tiyaan, Madhava Das, the husband of Kamala Das (Madhavikkutty), in Aami, and Chellappan, the raw, rustic and retro character from P.Padmarajan's literary world in Kaattu. As an actor, Murali has been praised for his attention to minute details and realistic acting style. His nuanced portrayal of Thomas Bastin IPS in the popular movie Drishyam 2 was widely acclaimed. His onscreen portrayals have won him many accolades including the 61st Filmfare Awards South for The Best Actor in a Supporting Role. Known to be greatly selective, Murali Gopy has worked only in a limited number of movies since his foray into the film industry in 2004, with each role striking a distinctive note.

=== As playback singer ===
Murali has rendered songs for many films. His "The LRL Anthem" in Left Right Left, "Pakalinu Veyil" in 1 by Two, "Kalippu" in Premam and "Bham Bham Shiv Bole" in Tiyaan, were super hits. He has won Asiavision Movie Award for The New Sensation in Singing for "LRL Anthem". He rendered a song for the film Ananthan Kaadu. He also sang for the film Dheeram and he has lent his voice to a song in the film Pet Detective & in the film Pennum Porattum.

=== As lyricist ===
Murali Gopy ventured into lyrics writing with the song "Neti" in Tiyaan, which describes the path to spiritual enlightenment. He has also written the Lucifer anthem song "Empuraane", which was sung by Usha Uthup. He penned the theme song of the movie Theerppu called "Raavil"and the track "Ghode Pe Aaya". In L2: Empuraan, he wrote the songs "Kaavalaai Chekavar" and "Azrael".He penned the song “Vedicha Theeyaal” for the film Ananthan Kaadu.

=== As music composer ===
Murali Gopy made his debut as a music composer with the song ‘Raavil..’ and ‘Ghode pe aaya..’for the movie ‘Theerppu’, which he also scripted and produced.

== Personal life ==
Murali was born as the son of the famous actor Bharat Gopy and Jayalakshmy in Thiruvananthapuram, Kerala. He was married to Anjana Pillai, and has two children, Gowri and Gowrav. Anjana died at the age of 38, on 26 April 2015 after suffering a heart attack.

Murali has launched a website in memory of his father Bharath Gopy.

== Awards ==
- 2026 - Best Writer Award from World Malayali Council, Mumbai.
- 2024 – Bharata Kesari Puraskaram, awarded by NFU, Muscat
- 2022 – Chalachitra Ratna Puraskar, awarded by M.S.Subbulakshmi Foundation
- 2019 – Ramu Kariat Award for the most popular screenwriter
- 2019 – Kalajyothi Award
- 2014 – Amrita Film Award for The Best Actor in Supporting Role
- 2014 – South Indian International Movie Awards for The Best Actor in Supporting Role
- 2014 – 61st Filmfare Awards South for The Best Actor in a Supporting Role
- 2014 – Jaihind Film Award for The Best Script
- 2014 – Yuva Award (2012–2013)
- 2013 – Thikkurissi Sukumaran Foundation Award for The Best Supporting Actor
- 2013 – Nana Film Award – Man of the Year
- 2013 – Asiavision Movie Award for The New Sensation in Singing
- 2013 – Asiavision Movie Award for The Best Screenplay
- 2013 – Santosham South India Film Awards for The Best Supporting Actor
- 2013 – Jaycey Foundation Award – Special Award
- 2013 – Jaihind Film Award – Special Jury Award
- 2013 – Vanitha Film Award for The Best Anti-Hero
- 2013 – Asianet Film Award for The Best Villain
- 2013 – Reporter Film Award for The Best Supporting Actor
- 2012 – P. Bhaskaran Foundation Award for The Best Story
- 2012 – Nana Film Award for the Best Script Writer
- 2012 – Asiavision Movie Award for The Best Anti-Hero
- 2012 – Asiavision Movie Awards for The New Sensation in Script
- 2012 – Mohan Raghavan Award for The Best Script Writer
- 2009 – The Sathyan Memorial Film Award for The Best Supporting Actor

== Filmography ==
Key
†	Denotes films that have not yet been released

=== As actor ===
Year	Title	Role	Notes
2004	Rasikan	Theliparambil Kaala Bhaskaran	
2009	Bhramaram	Dr. Alex Varghese	
2011	Gadhama	Bharathan	
2012	Ee Adutha Kaalathu	Ajay Kurien	
2012	Thappana	Manikuttan aka Kannukuttan	
2013	August Club	Nanda Gopan	
2013	Left Right Left	Roy Joseph aka Che Guevara Roy	
2013	Kaanchi	Perungodan Narayanan	
2013	Vedivazhipadu	Rahul Nair	
2013	Kanyaka Talkies	Father Michael Plathottathil	
2013	Ezhu Sundara Rathrikal	Tyson Alex	
2014	1 by Two	Dr. Hari Narayan / Ravi Narayan	
2014	Naku Penta Naku Taka	Anton Kulasingham	
2015	Lukka Chuppi	Sidharth Ram	
2016	Paavada	Chandramohan	
2016	Pa Va	Devassy Paappan	
2017	Tiyaan	Remakant Mahashay	
2017	Kaattu	Chellappan	
2018	Aami	Madhav Das	
2018	Kammara Sambhavam	Kelu Nambiar	
2019	Thakkol	Rector Mankunnath Paili	
2021	Drishyam 2	IG Thomas Bastin IPS	
2021	One	Marampalli Jayanandhan	
2021	The Last Two Days	Rakesh Madhavan	
2021	Kuruthi	Sathyan	
2022	Kochaal	Simon Thomas 'Irumban'	
2022	12th Man	DYSP Sreekumar	Voiceover
2024	Kanakarajyam	Venu	
2026	Drishyam 3	IG Thomas Bastin	
2026	Ananthan Kaadu	Thankaraj Ponnappan	Bilingual film
2026	Varavu	Medayil Kochettan	

=== As screenwriter ===
Year	Title	Notes
2004	Rasikan	
2012	Ee Adutha Kaalathu	
2013	Left Right Left	
2017	Tiyaan	
2018	Kammara Sambhavam	
2019	Lucifer	
2022	Theerppu	Also producer, Lyricist and Song composer
2025	L2: Empuraan	
2026	Ananthan Kaadu †	Bilingual film
TBA	Tyson †	

== Discography ==
=== As playback singer ===
Year	Song	Film	Language	Composer	Notes
2004	"Chaanju Nikkana"	Rasikan	Malayalam	Vidyasagar	
2013	"LRL Anthem – Kaal Kuzhanju"	Left Right Left	Malayalam	Gopi Sunder	Asiavision Movie Award for The New Sensation in Singing
2013	"Perungodante Paattu – Raavinte Mookamaam"	Kaanchi	Malayalam	Ronnie Raphael	
2014	"Pakalinu Veyil"	1 by Two	Malayalam	Gopi Sunder	
2015	"Kalippu"	Premam	Malayalam	Rajesh Murugesan	
2016	"Innu Njan Pokum"	Pa. Va	Malayalam	Anand Madhusoodanan	
2017	"The Mahashay Paean – Bham Bham Shiv Bole"	Tiyaan	Malayalam	Gopi Sunder	
2017	"Neti" (off screen version)	Tiyaan	Malayalam	Gopi Sunder	
2017	"Pottada Pottada"	Kaattu	Malayalam	Deepak Dev	
2018	"Anjandu Bharikkan"	Kammara Sambhavam	Malayalam	Gopi Sunder	
2019	"Varika Varika"	Lucifer	Malayalam	Devarajan Master	Music redesigned and produced by Deepak Dev
2019	"Kaalavum Maari"	Underworld	Malayalam	Yakzan Gary Pereira and Neha S Nair	
2025	"Vedicha Theeyaal"	Ananthan Kaadu	Malayalam	B. Ajaneesh Loknath	
2025	"Nerayi Veeraayi "	Dheeram	Malayalam	Manikandan Ayyappa	
2025	"Mexican Thaalappoli"	Pet Detective	Malayalam	Rajesh Murugesan	
2026	" Ru Ru Ru Ru"	Pennum Porattum	Malayalam	Dawn Vincent	

=== As composer ===
Year	Song	Film	Notes
2022	"Raavil"	Theerppu	
2022	"Ghode Pe Aaya"	Theerppu	

=== As lyricist ===
Year	Song	Film	Notes
2017	"Neti"	Tiyaan	
2019	"Empuraane- The Lucifer Anthem"	Lucifer	
2022	"Raavil"	Theerppu	
2022	"Ghode Pe Aaya"	Theerppu	
2025	"Kaavalaai Chekavar"	L2: Empuraan	
2025	"Azrael"	L2: Empuraan	
2025	"Vedicha Theeyaal"	Ananthan Kaadu	

== Bibliography ==
Year	Title	Publisher	Source
2012	Ee Adutha Kaalathu (screenplay)	Fabian Books	
2014	Left Right Left (screenplay)	Mathrubhumi Books	
2015	Murali Gopiyude Kadhakal (short story collection)	Mathrubhumi Books	
2025	Psychotic Daivam, Psychedelic Swargam, Psychiatric Manushyan (Novella/Short Stories)	DC Books	
2025	Lucifer (Screenplay)	DC Books	

== Television ==
Year	Show	Channel	Notes
2014	Music Mojo Season 2	Kappa TV	Live performance with Bennet and Band
2014	Chakkarapanthal	Mathrubhumi News	Anchored a special commemorative episode on Rafi and Dev Anand, on the occasion of the 34th death anniversary of Mohammed Rafi
2015	Murali Gopy's Tribute to Guru Dutt	Mathrubhumi News	
2017	AB@75: A Musical Tribute to Amitabh Bachchan	Mathrubhumi News	

== Radio ==
Year	Title	Role	Director	Channel	Notes
2015	Ee Stationil Ottakku	Station Master	Shihabuddin Poythumkadavu	All India Radio, Kozhikode	Broadcast as part of Natakotsavam
