= Lucifer (2019 Indian film) =

2019 Indian film by Prithviraj Sukumaran

- Theatrical release poster
- Directed by: Prithviraj Sukumaran
- Written by: Murali Gopy
- Produced by: Antony Perumbavoor
- Starring: Mohanlal; Prithviraj Sukumaran; Manju Warrier; Tovino Thomas; Vivek Oberoi; Indrajith Sukumaran
- Cinematography: Sujith Vaassudev
- Edited by: Samjith Mohammed
- Music by: Deepak Dev
- Production company: Aashirvad Cinemas
- Distributed by: Maxlab Cinemas and Entertainments
- Release date: 28 March 2019
- Running time: 174 minutes
- Country: India
- Language: Malayalam
- Budget: ₹30 crore
- Box office: est. ₹129 crore

Lucifer is a 2019 Indian Malayalam-language political action thriller film directed by Prithviraj Sukumaran (in his directorial debut) and written by Murali Gopy. It is the first installment in the Lucifer Universe. It is produced by Antony Perumbavoor under Aashirvad Cinemas. It stars Mohanlal along with an ensemble cast consisting of Prithviraj Sukumaran, Manju Warrier, Tovino Thomas, Vivek Oberoi, Indrajith Sukumaran, Saniya Iyappan, Saikumar, Kalabhavan Shajohn, Baiju Santhosh, Nyla Usha, Fazil, and Sachin Khedekar.

Development for the film began in 2016 when Gopy pitched the story to Prithviraj on the sets of Tiyaan. The title of the film was taken from a shelved project directed by Rajesh Pillai, which was also written by Gopy but with a different story. Pre-production began in 2017 with Gopy completing the final draft of the screenplay in February 2018. Principal photography began in July that year and was completed in January 2019, with filming taking place across Kerala in Thiruvananthapuram, Idukki, Ernakulam, and Kollam, along with schedules in Maharashtra, Karnataka, Union territory of Lakshadweep, and Russia. The film's music was composed by Deepak Dev, with the cinematography and editing handled by Sujith Vaassudev and Samjith Mohammed, respectively.

Lucifer was released in theatres worldwide on 28 March 2019 to positive reviews from critics. It was also dubbed and released in Hindi, Tamil, and Telugu. The film broke many box office records for a Malayalam film, crossing the ₹50 crore (US$5.2 million) mark in four days, ₹100 crore (US$10 million) mark in eight days, becoming the fastest Malayalam film to reach all these milestones. Lucifer was the first Malayalam film to earn more than ₹200 crore, including its box office collections and the earnings from the sale of its satellite rights and digital streaming rights in other languages. It is currently one of the highest-grossing Malayalam films. A sequel titled L2: Empuraan (2025) was released on 27 March 2025. It will be followed by a sequel titled L3: Azrael.

== Plot ==
At Interpol's headquarters in Lyon, officer Robert McCarthy reviews reports on the Khureshi Ab'raam nexus, a notorious secret society involved in global trade. A message from the CIA links the syndicate to African warlords and includes a surveillance image taken in Istanbul in April 2006. Realizing the significance, McCarthy identifies the figure as Khureshi Ab'raam. In Kerala, Chief Minister P. K. Ramdas ("PKR"), leader of the Indian Union Front (IUF), dies while being treated at a hospital owned by the opposition leader's daughter. Acting Chief Minister Mahesha Varma exploits the situation by inciting unrest outside the hospital ahead of the coming election. During the chaos, activist Govardhan livestreams accusations that PKR had become a puppet of a powerful financial syndicate controlling Indian politics. He names five possible successors: Priyadarshini "Priya" Ramdas, Jathin Ramdas, Bimal "Bobby" Nair, Mahesha Varma, and Stephen Nedumpally, whom he calls the most dangerous of them all — Lucifer.

Priya and Jathin are PKR's children. Priya is married to Bobby, a secretive drug lord involved in real estate, Hawala operations, and narcotics trafficking, though she is unaware of his crimes. Stephen, a mysterious ally favoured by PKR, has ties to post-war reconstruction in Iraq and Afghanistan, as well as gold smuggling from Dubai to Kerala. Govardhan questions why PKR trusted him so completely. After PKR's death, Bobby plans to seize control of the IUF by financing it with drug money. Partnering with Abdul and international drug boss Fyodor, he arranges a deal to flood Kerala with narcotics in exchange for political protection. Stephen opposes the plan and threatens Bobby, prompting Bobby to launch a smear campaign through the IUF-backed news channel NPTV. Govardhan provides evidence linking Bobby to criminal activities and alleges that the Khureshi Ab'raam nexus backs financier Manappattil Chandy. Bobby retaliates by abducting Govardhan. Meanwhile, Stephen violently prevents Bobby's men from using a sealed timber factory for drug production. Bobby's mole Aloshy later manipulates an orphan named Aparna into falsely accusing Stephen of sexual abuse at his shelter, Ashrayam. Public outrage leads to Stephen's arrest.

While imprisoned, Stephen contacts his loyal deputy Zayed Masood, leader of an international mercenary force. Zayed sabotages Fyodor's drug shipments and forces Bobby to secure Stephen's release. At the same time, Priya discovers Bobby has abused her daughter Jhanvi and was responsible for the deaths of both Jayadevan and PKR. Desperate, she turns to Stephen for protection. Stephen's men kill the corrupt commissioner Mayilvahanam and help Priya gain control of NPTV. Aparna publicly confesses that her allegations were false, and Priya and Jathin expose Bobby's criminal empire during a press conference. Bobby is later captured in Mumbai by Fyodor's men, but Zayed rescues him so Stephen can personally execute him. Murugan, revealed to be Stephen's spy, kills Aloshy. Govardhan is freed and reunited with his family, while Jathin becomes the new Chief Minister. In a post-credits scene, Stephen meets Zayed at an undisclosed location in Russia. During a call from the gold smuggler Sanghani, Stephen reveals that he himself is Khureshi Ab'raam, confirming his control over powerful secret societies worldwide.

== Cast ==
- Mohanlal as Stephen Nedumpally alias "Esthappan" / Khureshi Ab'raam 'KA'
  - Adarsh as young Stephen
- Prithviraj Sukumaran as Zayed Masood, Khureshi's right-hand-man (extended cameo appearance)
- Vivek Oberoi as Bimal Nair aka Bobby, Priya's second husband, the main antagonist
- Manju Warrier as Priyadarshini "Priya" Ramdas, P. K. Ramdas' daughter; Bobby's wife
- Tovino Thomas as Jathin Ramdas, P. K. Ramdas' son (extended cameo appearance)
- Indrajith Sukumaran as Govardhan
- Saniya Iyappan as Jhanvi Jayadev, Priya's daughter
- Saikumar as Mahesha Varma
- Kalabhavan Shajohn as Aloshy Joseph
- Nyla Usha as Arundathi Sanjeev
- Giju John as Sanjeev Kumar
- Baiju Santhosh as Murugan
- Fazil as Father Nedumpally
- Sachin Khedekar as P. K. Ramdas, former Chief Minister of Kerala
- Suresh Chandra Menon as Abdul
- Shivaji Guruvayoor as Medyail Rajan
- Nandhu as P. S. Peethambran
- John Vijay as Mayilvahanam IPS
- Aneesh G. Menon as Sumesh
- Kainakary Thankaraj as Nedumpally Krishnan
- Bala as Bhadran
- Adil Ibrahim as Riju
- Shaun Romy as Aparna
- Murugan Martin as Muthu
- Jaise Jose as Xavier, Stephen's assistant
- Thara Kalyan as Jhanvi's principal
- Alexx O'Nell as Interpol Officer Robert McCarthy
- Binu Pappu as Jail Warden
- Maala Parvathi as Jhanvi's doctor
- V. K. Prakash as Doctor
- Sreeya Remesh as Gomathy
- Sshivada as Sreelekha, Govardhan's wife
- Baiju V. K. as Sarath
- Sijoy Varghese as PR Agent
- Antony Perumbavoor as Daniel Rawuther
- Waluscha De Sousa as an item dancer in the song "Raftaara"
- Shakti Kapoor as Sanghani, a North Indian gold smuggler (cameo appearance)

== Production ==
=== Development ===
In 2012, a film titled Lucifer was reported to be in development, to be directed by Rajesh Pillai, written by Murali Gopy, and starring Mohanlal in the lead role. It was to be produced by Antony Perumbavoor of Aashirvad Cinemas, and was planned as a 2013 release. Pillai later confirmed the project and said that it is his "dream come true" to direct Mohanlal and the film will be a "treat" for his fans. Filming was to begin in 2013. Aashirvad Cinemas registered the title in 2012 with the Kerala Film Chamber of Commerce. However, in May 2013, Pillai said the production would not begin that year as he was busy with Motorcycle Diaries and Murali was working on Left Right Left; they are planning a discussion in June hoping to begin filming by January 2014. He also disclosed Lucifer would be a thriller and that the story had been developed. Pillai's regular collaborator Kunchacko Boban was reported to be part of the cast. Boban commented that he had not signed the film, but did not deny the possibility. Pillai confirmed that Gopy would also be acting in the project, besides writing it. As of May 2013, only Mohanlal and Gopy were part of the cast. In July, it was reported Murali had begun writing the screenplay. However, the project was put on hold and Pillai decided to work on other projects. After Pillai's death in February 2016, the film was shelved.

In July 2016, Gopy revealed to The Hindu in an interview that he was planning to work on a screenplay titled Lucifer between his other commitments. On 15 September, actor Prithviraj Sukumaran announced that Lucifer, written by Murali Gopy, starring Mohanlal and produced by Aashirvad Cinemas, would be his directorial debut. Murali and Prithviraj clarified that it is not the same film as Pillai's Lucifer, but they have taken the title. Murali had prepared two one-line stories both under the working title Lucifer. Pillai was to direct the film based on the first story, but that film did not materialise; he discarded that story. The second story was narrated to Prithviraj, whom he agreed to direct.

Murali had discussed the story with Mohanlal in 2012; no director was finalised at the time. Murali said that Prithviraj had shown interest in directing a film based on his screenplay and they discussed it for about a year. Prithviraj also wished to cast Mohanlal in his directorial debut, which is why he narrated the story of Lucifer to him. Murali pitched the idea to Prithviraj on the sets of Tiyaan in 2016 at the Ramoji Film City. Prithviraj was skeptical to whether Mohanlal and Antony Perumbavoor would agree on him directing the film as "it was a story that any big filmmaker would say yes to". The next day, Antony met them in Hyderabad and gave the project the greenlight. According to Prithviraj, "the thought behind the film and what the film can be" attracted him. Murali was planning to write the final draft of screenplay after finishing his acting commitments in Tiyaan and Kammara Sambhavam.

In December 2016, Mohanlal revealed that Lucifer was in early development and needed to be developed into a screenplay saying, "the content has to be good and that's what the focus is right now". In February 2017, Prithviraj revealed that pre-production would begin in late 2017 and filming would begin in 2018. In April, Mohanlal, Prithviraj, Murali and Antony announced in a press conference that the film had entered pre-production. Prithviraj revealed that the script had not yet been "fleshed out" and the rest of the cast would be decided after that. Prithviraj purchased an apartment in Thevara as a work-space for the scripting and pre-production work of Lucifer and his future projects: "I felt I needed a space to assemble my team. Do the research and develop the film. This place might well be known as Lucifer's office in future". In June 2017, in an interview, Prithviraj revealed that Lucifer would be release in 2019. In October, Murali revealed that he would be taking a break from acting after Kammara Sambhavam to write Lucifer and complete it by February 2018. In December, Prithviraj revealed that the writing was progressing and filming was to commence by the end of May or early June 2018 after he completes the first schedule of Aadujeevitham.

Murali and Prithviraj narrated the final draft of the screenplay to Mohanlal on 26 March 2018 on the sets of Odiyan. Mohanlal liked the script and agreed to go ahead with shooting. In June, Mohanlal told The Times of India that the film would be shot in Kerala, Mumbai, and in a foreign location. The team was finalising the locations in Thiruvananthapuram by the end of the month. Prithviraj disclosed in a channel podcast that filming would begin on 18 July. This was later updated to 16 July. Near to the beginning of filming, Prithviraj hinted that the film deals with politics. However, he revealed that "it's a not a film about politics but the story happens with politics in the background". The names of the technical crew were revealed in July when the first poster was released. It carries the tagline "blood, brotherhood, betrayal".

=== Casting ===
In 2014, while appearing on the Tamil talk show Koffee with DD, Prithviraj said that Mohanlal and Manju Warrier are his "dream cast" if he ever directs a film. In September 2016, Murali said that he was uncertain as to whether he would be acting in the film, noting that it was premature to discuss the cast other than Mohanlal. Ultimately, he was not part of the final cast. In January 2018, Madhusudhan Rao confirmed his casting in the film. He co-starred alongside Prithviraj in Adam Joan (2017), during which he was promised a role in Lucifer. However, he eventually did not feature in the film. In the following month, Lena revealed Lucifer as one of her upcoming projects. Both Rao and Lena were not part of the final cast. Following unconfirmed reports of Warrier's casting in May, a source close to the actress confirmed the news to The Times of India. However, when asked, the production house stated the casting process was progressing and was subject to changes. She was finally cast in the role of Priyadarshini Ramdas.

In June, it was reported Saniya Iyappan would be playing the role of Manju Warrier's on-screen daughter. In early July, Antony Perumbavoor revealed that Vivek Oberoi was a part of the film and expressed his gratitude for having him on board. Lucifer marks Oberoi's debut in Malayalam cinema. He spent a month preparing for the role and retained a diction coach to help him understand the Malayalam language and its pronunciation. Oberoi's voice was dubbed by Vineeth. During post-production, Prithviraj himself dubbed all the dialogues of Oberoi and gave them to Vineeth as a reference for the character's sound modulation. In July, Prithviraj confirmed that his brother Indrajith Sukumaran was part of the cast. He plays the character of Govardhan. In the same month, Pauly Valsan stated that she had been called for a 6-day shoot. In August, Mamta Mohandas revealed that Prithviraj had spoken to her about a role, but could not reveal anything about it at that time. She was however replaced by Nyla Usha.

Prithviraj asked director Fazil to play the role of Father Nedumpally, a priest. Fazil, who had not acted in a film for nearly 34 years, commented that he agreed to take the role as he could not refuse Prithviraj. He plays the role of a mentor to Stephen. Prithviraj cast his Ranam co-star Giju John in a pivotal role. Tovino Thomas, Sachin Khedekar, Shivaji Guruvayoor, Nandu, John Vijay, Kalabhavan Shajohn, Sai Kumar, Baiju Santhosh were among the other actors cast in the film. Prithviraj also acted in the film as Zayed Masood. His role was kept under wraps and was revealed two days before the film's release.

=== Filming ===
Principal photography began on 16 July 2018 with a customary pooja function held at Springdale Heritage resort in Vandiperiyar, Idukki. Sujith Vaassudev was the film's director of photography. Mohanlal was expected to join production in the following days. Filming took place at Kuttikkanam and Vandiperiyar early in the schedule, and in Thodupuzha later that month. Filming also took place in Kochi and Ernakulam, before moving to Thiruvananthapuram. Around 2000 junior artists (extras) participated in the shoot in Ernakulam. Thereafter, shooting was scheduled in Thiruvananthapuram from 6 August to 15 September for 40 days. Mohanlal's first shot was with Fazil. They had two scenes and shot for three days. Stephen's (Mohanlal) car used in the film is a Hindustan Landmaster inscribed with the number 666 on the vehicle registration plate. Filming took place in Vandiperiyar in early August and was planned to take place until 10 August.

Filming was planned across 25 locations in the Thiruvananthapuram district, beginning at Government College for Women from 12 August. Government Model Boys Higher Secondary School was one of the locations on this schedule. Scenes featuring Oberoi and Warrier were shot at the Kuthiramalika Palace on 20 August. On the same day, the film was also shot at a resort in Poovar. Mohanlal, who was on a break, resumed filming on 21 August. Warrier was spotted during the shoot at Azeezia Medical College in Kollam. Filming took place at the Kanakakkunnu Palace on 28 August, where Mohanlal and Warrier were present. During the shoot, many of the white taxis were transformed into official state cars. By the end of the month, Tovino joined the set at the Kanakakkunnu Palace grounds. He completed his portions in the film by early September. Before his departure, his scenes with Warrier were shot at the beginning of the month and his other scenes in late September. The Thiruvananthapuram scenes was scheduled to last until 20 September, and then was to move to Kuttikkanam. Oberoi acted in a scene shot at the Greenfield International Stadium early that month. Sai Kumar and Shivaji Guruvayoor took part in the shoot that took place at a university hostel in Thiruvananthapuram in the beginning of September.

In an interview, actor Nandu said that many of the film's scenes comprised 40–50 shots and contained 500–1000 junior artists; some have as many as 3000–4000 artists. Filming went on around the overpass beside the Chandrasekharan Nair Stadium in Palayam on 4 September. More than 2000 junior artists participated in that scene. It features Stephen arriving at a large riot. Around 5000 junior artists took part in a major scene shot in Adimalathura beach; more than 100 vehicles were used. Reportedly, almost every major character in the film was present in that scene. It was filmed in 15 days. After the schedule at Thiruvananthapuram was completed on 20 September, the production was put on hold for a break and the next session began on 5 October in Kuttikkanam.

Giju John joined the set in early October and took part in a one-day shoot in Thiruvananthapuram and later in Kochi for his remaining portions. For filming a fight scene, Prithviraj went for location scouting in Minicoy, Lakshadweep later that month. Stunt Silva was the film's fight choreographer. Filming was scheduled for three days from 30 October to 1 November in Thiruvananthapuram for scenes featuring Tovino and Indrajith. Filming in Kerala was completed and the next schedule was to begin in Mumbai from 4 November. A set was built in Mumbai, Prithviraj said: "I have a wish that the Mumbai we show in Lucifer is not what we have seen before in films. It's a major schedule". Mohanlal joined the set by mid-November. Sachin Khedekar was featured in the Mumbai schedule. The team moved to Russia in December, where filming took place in Saint Petersburg. Mohanlal completed his portions in the film on this schedule. Filming also took place in Bangalore. On 30 December 2018, Prithviraj revealed in a public interaction said that the principal photography was near completion with only four-day patch-up shots remaining to be filmed in Lakshadweep. The inability to reach the island caused a delay; in the meantime, post-production had begun. Filming was wrapped on 20 January 2019 at the Kavaratti island in Lakshadweep.

== Soundtrack ==
Deepak Dev provided the music for the film. The soundtrack album was distributed by the label Goodwill Entertainment. Usha Uthup rendered a song titled "Empuraane – The Lucifer Anthem". For the film, Dev redesigned and programmed the patriotic song "Varika Varika Sahajare", originally composed by G. Devarajan and written by Amsi Narayanapilla during the Salt March and was sung by Murali Gopy. "Kadavule Pole" written by Logan was sung by Karthik. "Raftaara" sung by Jyotsna was written by Tanishk Nabar. The entire background score album was released on 26 January 2021, coinciding with the Republic Day of India.

== Release ==
=== Theatrical ===
The film was released in theatres worldwide on 28 March 2019. It was also dubbed and released in other Indian languages. The Telugu dubbed version of the film was released on 12 April 2019. On 30 March 2019, Google India released an animated doodle on their Twitter page featuring Mohanlal and Yuvraj Singh playing tennis, with a caption: "The heroes who know how to smash all records". Lucifer, Miami Open, and Yuvraj Singh topped the Google Trends on the week. Lucifer was released for digital download on 16 May 2019, available as VOD on Amazon Prime Video in Malayalam, Tamil and Telugu languages.

== Reception ==
Lucifer received positive reviews from critics praising its cast performances, cinematography, background score, action sequences, and direction. On the review aggregator website Rotten Tomatoes, 40% of 5 critics' reviews are positive, with an average rating of 7.5/10.

=== Critical response ===
Sanjith Sidhardhan of The Times of India gave 3.5 out of 5 stars and wrote, "Lucifer is a 'mass entertainer’ that is sure to please the fans and has enough going for it to make it an engaging thriller as well. And apart from the mandatory Stan Lee, correction, Antony Perumbavoor cameo, watch out for Stephen's second avatar in the film." However, Firstpost gave 1.75 out of 5 stars and wrote "There is so much that could have been done with this intriguingly frank and realistic theory on the essentialness of evil — in politics and for human survival at large. What we get instead is Lucifer's transparent ambition that overwhelms everything else in this enterprise." Abin Ponnappan of The Indian Express wrote "Lucifer has some obvious parallels to Tamil movie Petta by Karthik Subbaraj, where the director made better use of the star and actor in Rajinikanth. As Karthik gave life to the Rajini fan in him, he also revived Rajini's lost magic from earlier hits like Padayappa and Baashha. Prithviraj has tried to bring out the best version of Mohanlal, the star. For Mohanlal fans like him all over the world, Lucifer will be a treat."

Sethuraman. S of Film Companion gave 3 out of 5 stars and wrote, " 'Lucifer' " is a clichéd plot written cleverly and delivered with aplomb. Prithviraj makes an assured directorial debut with the film that was high on budget and expectation. The movie has lived up to the hype and will set the box office cash registers ringing for a long time." Lakshana. N. Palat of India Today gave 3 out of 5 stars and wrote, "In short, Lucifer is like Mohanlal fanfiction brought to life on-screen. If you swear by Mohanlal, go for it." Sify gave 3 out of 5 stars and wrote "Lucifer is a masala entertainer that is no less than a treat for the fans of Mohanlal. It is an intriguing political crime thriller with smashing dialogue. Go for it!" S. Yadhunath of Mathrabhumi wrote "‘Lucifer’ is a mass movie which celebrates the mannerisms of superstar Mohanlal. In fact, it is a Mohanlal starrer which filled the audience’s hearts after Pulimurugan. By discussing the unseen dimensions in politics, the film conveys that politics is the most dramatic stage. It is a complete political thriller played by a complete actor. Sujith Vasudev's visuals and Deepak Dev's background music maintain the mood of the movie." Sowmya Rajendran of The News Minute gave 2 out of 5 stars and wrote "Mohanlal is all mass, but the film lacks a strong script and depends too much on stylized shots and background music to do the job."

=== Box office ===
The opening day worldwide gross is estimated to be ₹14 crore. In the opening weekend (28 – 31 March), the film earned ₹26.70 crore in India, including ₹22.05 crore from Kerala alone and ₹4.65 crore from rest of India with major share coming from Karnataka and Tamil Nadu. In the overseas markets, it grossed a total of ₹27.2 crore (US$2.8 million) in the opening weekend (which is bigger than the domestic weekend total), including ₹22.2 crore (US$2.3 million) from the United Arab Emirates (UAE) and other Gulf Cooperation Council (GCC) territories, ₹2.27 crore (US$240,000) from the United States, and ₹2.73 crore (US$280,000) from the United Kingdom and other regions. The estimated total worldwide gross was ₹53.90 crore (US$5.6 million) – ₹54.77 crore (US$5.7 million) in the opening weekend (the highest for any Malayalam film), by doing so Lucifer emerged as one of the top highest-grossing Malayalam films of all time and the fastest Malayalam film to pass ₹50 crore (US$5.2 million) mark (in 4 days), per trade analysts.

Lucifer had more than 160,000 admissions in the UAE in 3 days, beating Captain Marvel. Opening weekend (28 – 31 March) total was ₹17.8 crore (US$1.8 million) from 61 screens, the best grosser of that weekend. It is also the second biggest opening weekend in the UAE for a South Indian film, behind Baahubali 2: The Conclusion (2017). In the UK, the film was ranked seventh in the list of top ten best grossing films of the weekend 29 – 31 March, with ₹1.42 crore (US$150,000) from 89 sites, Lucifer was the only foreign language film that came within the top ten positions. Lucifer with ₹30.73 crore (US$3.2 million) had the third best opening of the year for an Indian film in overseas markets, behind Petta ($6.62 million) and Gully Boy ($4.8 million). The film grossed ₹25 crore (US$2.6 million) from the UAE in six weeks, ₹43.16 lakh (US$45,000) from New Zealand in three weeks, and ₹77.24 lakh (US$80,000) from Australia in three weeks.

On 7 April, trade analyst Taran Adarsh tweeted: "#Lucifer has emerged a trendsetter for #Malayalam films internationally. Earlier, #Malayalam films would record big numbers in certain markets [UAE-GCC in particular], but #Lucifer is doing exceptional biz everywhere, despite other language movies posing tough competition ... the super success of #Lucifer in the international arena should open the eyes of the #Malayalam film industry... And encourage makers of #Malayalam films to explore newer markets, ...". A month after release, the film became the 13th highest-grossing South Indian film overseas, by grossing ₹50.03 crore (US$5.2 million), and the first Malayalam film to gross ₹50 crore (US$5.2 million) in overseas box office. In an article published by Pinkvilla in May 2023, it was reported that the worldwide gross collection of the film was ₹125.50 crore.

== Accolades ==
Award	Category	Winner	Ref.
Kerala State Film Awards	Best Dubbing Artist	Vineeth (dubbed for Vivek Oberoi)	
Kerala Film Critics Awards	Best Editor	Samjith Mohammed	
Kerala Film Critics Awards	Special Jury Award (Director)	Prithviraj Sukumaran	
Vanitha Film Awards	Most Popular Film	Antony Perumbavoor (producer)	
Vanitha Film Awards	Best Director	Prithviraj Sukumaran	
Vanitha Film Awards	Best Actor	Mohanlal	
Vanitha Film Awards	Best Actress	Manju Warrier	
Vanitha Film Awards	Best Villain	Vivek Oberoi	
Asianet Film Awards	Best Director	Prithviraj Sukumaran	
Asianet Film Awards	Best Actor	Mohanlal	
Asianet Film Awards	Best Actor in a Negative Role	Vivek Oberoi	
Asianet Film Awards	Best Film	Antony Perumbavoor	
Mazhavil Entertainment Awards	Best Director	Prithviraj Sukumaran	
Mazhavil Entertainment Awards	Best Action Choreographer	Stunt Silva	
South Indian International Movie Awards	Best Film (Malayalam)	Antony Perumbavoor (producer)	
South Indian International Movie Awards	Best Debut Director (Malayalam)	Prithviraj Sukumaran	
South Indian International Movie Awards	Best Actor in a Leading Role (Malayalam)	Mohanlal	
South Indian International Movie Awards	Best Actress in a Leading Role (Malayalam)	Manju Warrier	
South Indian International Movie Awards	Best Actress in a Supporting Role (Malayalam)	Saniya Iyappan	

== Sequels ==
When asked about any prequel or sequel plans, Murali told to The Hindu: "It has been made evident on screen that the film is modelled as a franchise platform. There are sumptuous dramatic clues and hideaways throughout the film, which hint at continuity". On a May 2019 interview to The Times of India, Prithviraj said that he has not decided on directing a sequel because of the time he needs to find for the film in between his busy acting schedules. At the same time, he said: "Lucifer was never written as a one-film story. From the time Murali and I started talking about the story, we knew it wasn't something that would end in a single film. In fact, I was quite tempted to do an 11-episode web series because the story is that spread out. We have sort of just picked one area with a few characters of a saga".

On 18 June 2019, a follow-up to the film titled L2: Empuraan was officially announced by Prithviraj, Mohanlal, Murali, and Antony at a press conference held at Kochi. The film was set to begin production in the second half of 2020, but was put on hold indefinitely due to the COVID-19 pandemic. According to Prithviraj, "Empuraan" means "more than a King and less than a god" and the literal meaning would be "overlord". He said Empuraan will not be a continuation of the story seen in Lucifer, but will explain what happened before and after Lucifer. He also revealed that Zayed Masood's role in Stephen's and Khureshi's life is not as small as what is seen in Lucifer.

== Remake ==
In late September 2019, actor Chiranjeevi during a press event for Sye Raa Narasimha Reddy in Kerala announced that he would star in the Telugu version of the film, and has already bought the remake rights, adding that he would start filming after Sye Raa, he even announced his intent to have Prithviraj direct the Telugu remake, being impressed with the Malayalam version. The remake titled Godfather began its production in 2021 with Mohan Raja as the director.
