= Pa Va =

- Theatrical release poster
- Directed by: Sooraj Tom
- Written by: Ajish Thomas
- Screenplay by: Ajish Thomas
- Produced by: Siyad Muhammed
- Starring: Murali Gopy; Anoop Menon
- Cinematography: Satheesh Kurup
- Edited by: Kiran Das
- Music by: Anand Madhusoodanan
- Production company: Safa Entertainment
- Release date: 22 July 2016
- Country: India
- Language: Malayalam

Pa Va (stylized as Pa..Va and also known as Pappanekkurichum Varkeyekkurichum; English: About Pappen and Varkey) is a 2016 Indian Malayalam existential comedy drama film directed by Sooraj Tom in his directorial debut. It stars Murali Gopy and Anoop Menon in the lead roles as two octogenarian friends. It is produced by Siyad Muhammed under his home production banner Safa Entertainment.

The movie narrates the love and friendship shared between two close friends, Devassy Paappan (Murali Gopi) and Perianthanam Varkichan (Anoop Menon) who can't do without each other despite having completely opposite personalities. The film was released on 22 July 2016.

== Plot ==
It focuses on the existential aspects of life through two close octogenarian friends, Pulimoottil Devassy Pappen and Periyanthaanam Varkey. Pappen is a planter who shares his good moments with jackfruit loving and Varkey, who is a retired Indian Army Brigadier and antique collector. Both of them are prosperous and well-settled, with an unmarried Pappen living with his loving sisters and their families in Konnayi and Varkey enjoying retired life with his wife in Murikkel, with their children abroad. One day, Pappen shares his fear of dying to Varkey, but Varkey blends the concern with humor and encourages him. Soon after, Varkey dies from what he loves the most, a jackfruit falls onto him. Varkey's death disturbs Pappen. Pappen sees Varkey in his dreams and starts to see him and talk to him in daytime. Pappen's loving sisters and his male help Kunju take care of him. Pappen feels his and his family's interment should be at his hometown church in Murikkel with his ancestors and friend Varkey. But his current church in Konnayi doesn't agree with it under the fear of losing a wealthy family and an economic source that could affect the church in this transition. Pappen has dreams and thoughts about a girl whom he and Varkey had pined over but had died in her youth. Pappen under Varkey's spirit's interest goes on to find whom their love interest liked the most finds out painfully she was interested in evangelism. Pappen visits Varkey's house to meet his wife and learns she is moving to America to join her children and Varkey's coveted antiques are considered as silly objects like used to dry clothes and such. The church committee and the priests do their best to block Pappen's move towards his hometown church. Meanwhile, Pappen falls sick and into a coma. This motivates his family members to buy Pappen's ancestor's land in his hometown and a burial plot in the hometown church cemetery. The priest of Pappen's current church who is motivated by financial interests and fame is visited by Varkey's spirit for not allowing Pappen's request. The priest signs the permission letter and dies from the shock and is seen laughing in spirit form with Varkey, pondering over his absurdity while he lived. Pappen wakes up from his Comma and the family happily transfers to his hometown church. However, he does what the priest wished to do for fame and dedicates it to the priest. Some time later, Pappen dies and is met with Varkey in heaven, and they both plan to cross the barriers between them and their love interest in heaven using their wit and strength of friendship.

== Cast ==
- Murali Gopy as Pulimoottil Devassy Pappen
  - Arun Sidharth as Young Pappen
- Anoop Menon as Periyanthaanam Varkey, retired Brigadier (Indian Army)
  - Akash Pathmakumar as Young Varkey
- Indrans as Kunju
- Kaviyoor Ponnamma as Agnes/Sister amma, Pappen's 1st younger sister
- KPAC Lalitha as Annamma, Pappen's 2nd younger sister
- Ponnamma Babu as Theyyamma, Pappen's 3rd sister
- Vanitha Krishnachandran as Elamma, Pappen's 4th sister
- Ranjini as Lillykutty, Pappen's 5th sister
- Muthumani as Kunjumol, Pappen's youngest sister
- Bhagyalakshmi as Filomena/Filo, Varkey's wife
- Jose as Jose Achayan, Lillykkutty's husband
- Renji Panicker as Thampuran Johnny
- Ashokan as Chackochan
- P Balachandran as Father Micheal Kallayi (Kallayi Achan), priest of Pappen's current church
- Shammi Thilakan as Father Ittiparamban, priest of Pappen's hometown church
- Jagannatha Varma as Bishop
- Sunil Sukhada as Brother Paili, Theyyamma's husband
- Edavela Babu as Brother Paul, Theyyamma's son
- Jomon K John as Edwin
- Sethulakshmi as Ammini
- Eloor George as Konnayi Kapiyar
- Arya as Sister Emily, Elamma's daughter
- Ramu as Dr. Mathew, Elamma's husband
- Santhosh as Thommi
- Chali Pala as Francis
- Shiju as George
- Aparna as Mary's friend
- Pauly Valsan as Pulimoottil housemaid
- Alexander Prashanth as Gregory
- Cherthala Lalitha as Mother Superior
- Kozhikode Sharada as Thresia
- Naseer Sankranthi as Jr. Priest
- Ajay as Josutty
- Anish as MLA
- Kalabhavan Rahman as Subinspector
- PK Unnikrishnan as Beeranikka
- Purushan Kottayam as Jose
- Kottayam Manju as Jose' wife Kunjumol
- Anjana Appukuttan as Nurse
- Prayaga Martin as Mary, Pappen & Varkey's love interest (cameo appearance)

== Soundtrack ==
Music: Anand Madhusoodanan, Lyrics: Santhosh Varma, Suku Damodar, Rafeeq Ahammed, Harinarayanan.

- "Podimeesa" - P. Jayachandran
- "Vinnil Theliyum" - Vijay Yesudas, Aparna Balamurali
- "Innu Njan Pokum" - Murali Gopy
- "Pavakku Bhoomiyil" - Sithara Krishnakumar
- "Kalyanam Kalyanam" - Minmini, P. K. Nithin
- "De Ithennatha" - Swarna Vinayan

"Podimeesa" became a track in top ten charts of 2016.

Release

On 10 June 2016, a trailer was released on YouTube with a release date set for Ramadan 2016. However, due to competition from other releases, the film was postponed, and was finally released on 22 July 2016.
