= Rasikan =

- Directed by: Lal Jose
- Written by: Murali Gopy
- Produced by: Sudhish
- Starring: Dileep; Murali Gopy; Biju Menon
- Cinematography: Rajeev Ravi
- Edited by: Ranjan Abraham
- Music by: Vidyasagar
- Production company: Trinity Productions
- Distributed by: Kalasangham Films
- Release date: 16 December 2004
- Running time: 140 minutes
- Country: India
- Language: Malayalam

Rasikan (transl. Funny Guy (Note: In this film, Rasikan is an equivalent to the Tamil word Rasigan (ரசிகனஂ; transl. Fan).)) is a 2004 Indian Malayalam-language action comedy film directed by Lal Jose and written by Murali Gopy starring Dileep in the lead role with Biju Menon and Murali Gopy in the supporting roles. This was the debut film for both Murali Gopy and Samvrutha Sunil. The movie was an average hit.

== Synopsis ==
Sivankutty is a big fan of superstar Mohanlal. A part-time electrician, Sivankutty ekes out a living selling movie tickets in the black. It is at this stage that comely Karishma Menon walks into his life. Karishma is an engineering student who happens to be staying in a hostel near Sivankutty's house. Sivankutty is bowled over by Karishma's curls and charms. But Sivankutty's cousin Thanki alias Parvathi is in love with him, which Sivankutty is unaware about.

Meanwhile, Theliparambil Bhaskaran, a dreaded gangster and criminal has killed a policeman Ramabhadran and is in spending life imprisonment in jail. Besides her grief, Ramabhadran's mother goes insane. Since Bhaskaran was a terror in the village, no one was ready to testify against him. But the plight of the old woman moves Sivankutty, who musters the courage to give evidence against Bhaskaran. A pep talk by the local inspector Kapil Dev also gives Sivankutty the courage to take on Bhaskaran. The daring deed makes him a hero in the village. Soon, Sivankutty learns that Bhaskaran will be released on parole and going to kill him. Sivankutty develops a cold feet.

When Bhaskaran gets released and comes to kill Sivankutty, to everyone's surprise, though injured, Sivankutty retaliates by overpowering and defeating Bhaskaran and his men. One of Bhaskaran's men creates a chaos and tries to help him kill Sivankutty, but Sivankutty accidentally kills Bhaskaran in the chaos. The villagers become happy and celebrates Bhaskaran's death.

== Cast ==
- Dileep as B. Sivankutty
- Biju Menon as SI Kapil Dev
- Murali Gopy as Thelliparambil 'Kaala' Bhaskaran, the main antagonist
- Sidharth Bharathan as Sudhi, Sivankutty's friend
- Aniyappan as Jango, Sivankutty's friend
- Kalabhavan Abi as Abu, Sivankutty's rival turned friend
- Samvrutha Sunil as Parvathy (Thanki), Sivankutty's fiancée
- Sishwa as Karishma Menon, Sivankutty's ex-lover
- Dinesh Prabhakar as Mohanan Kodumpara, Sivankutty's friend
- Sukumari as Bhargaviyamma, Sivankutty's mother
- Jagathy Sreekumar as Thomas Chacko (Varathan Thoma)
- Mala Aravindan as Thanki's father
- Neena Kurup as Shailaja, Sivankutty's sister
- Harimurali as Unnikkuttan, Sivankutty's nephew
- Manikandan Pattambi as Nana Vasudevan, Sivankutty's friend
- Suraj Venjaramoodu as Abu's friend
- Hakim Rawther as Maari
- Ambika Mohan as Madhavi, Thanki's mother
- Nishanth Sagar as Arjun
- Kalabhavan Shajohn as Head Constable P.K. Ramabhadran (Guest appearance)
- Narayanankutty as Postman Annachi
- Salim Kumar as Paramu, Sivankutty's brother-in-law (Guest appearance)
- Machan Varghese as PC Velu
- Madampu Kunjukuttan as Bharathan, Sivankutty's father
- Abu Salim as Cyber Anto
- Ajith Kollam as Bhaskaran's henchman
- Santhakumari as Ramabhadran's mother
- J. Pallassery as Astrologer
- Priya Mohan as Karishma Menon's friend
- Vishnu Prasad as Akhilesh Nair

== Soundtrack ==
All lyrics are written by Gireesh Puthenchery except where noted; all music is composed by Vidyasagar.

No.	Title	Lyrics	Artist(s)	Length
1.	"Thotturummi"		V. Devanand, Sujatha Mohan
2.	"Nee Vaada"		Biju Narayanan, Vidhu Prathap
3.	"Marimazha"		Karthik, Veena Haridas
4.	"Maama Nee"		M. G. Sreekumar, Vineeth Sreenivasan
5.	"Thotturummi" (Female)		Sujatha Mohan
6.	"Chanju Nilkunna"	M. D. Ashok	Murali Gopy
7.	"Dhalava Theruvile"		Shankar Mahadevan
8.	"Hara Hara"		Kalyani Menon, Dinesh, Roji Varghese, Savitha

== Reception ==
The film was an average grosser at box office. Later this received positive response from the audience after the release of its DVD. Prathiba Joy of Deccan Herald wrote, "Disappointing is the one word that can sum up Rasikan, as Lal Jose fail to recreate the magic of their earlier film Meesha Madhavan. With a wafer-thin story line, Rasikan tells the story of die-hard Mohanlal fan Sivankutty, a part-time TV mechanic. He supplements his income by doing jobs like sticking film posters and selling cinema tickets in black."
