= Ashvin Mathew =

Indian actor, stand-up comedian and film director

- Occupations: Stand-up comedian Actor; Film director

Ashvin Mathew is an Indian film and stage actor, stand-up comedian and film director.

== Early and personal life ==
Ashwin Mathew is a Malayali who grew up in Bangalore. His father is a doctor and his mother is an agriculturalist. His first play was Restless: The Spirit of Youth, by Gautam Raja and Meenakshi Menon. He then studied performing arts in Sydney before leaving it to study Mass communication and Drama in Cyprus. He first worked as an RJ in Cyprus, before leaving to become a theatre teacher in Dubai. He returned to Bangalore and was one of the first stand-up comedians in 1999. He acted in Gentlemen, a play by Anil Abraham. He subsequently became a full-fledged actor.

== Career ==
He began his film career by working with Kukku Surendran to tweak the script of Veeralipattu. He was selected to portray the role of the English teacher of Sridevi's daughter in English Vinglish. Actress Padmapriya and Sangeetha Padmanaban suggested his name for Vedivazhipadu, which became his first Malayalam movie. He subsequently went on to act in multiple Malayalam movies. Mathew has also written the script for two unreleased Tamil movies, Uthukuli Amigos and Gymkhana Vasu, both of which were in the planning stages of production.

== Filmography ==
| Year | Film | Role | Language | Notes and Ref. |
|---|---|---|---|---|
| 2012 | English Vinglish | Father Vincent | Hindi | |
| 2013 | Vedivazhipadu | PP | Malayalam | |
| 2014 | 1 by Two | Dr. Balakrishnan | Malayalam | |
| 2014 | Mr. Fraud | Javed | Malayalam | |
| 2014 | Peruchazhi | Rohit Jee | Malayalam | |
| 2014 | Tamaar Padaar | John Katuparamban | Malayalam | |
| 2015 | Loham | Ramesh Menon | Malayalam | |
| 2016 | Ka Bodyscapes | Bhakthavalsalan | Malayalam | |
| 2017 | Jomonte Suvisheshangal | David | Malayalam | |
| 2017 | C/O Saira Banu | Adv. Abel Alex | Malayalam | |
| 2022 | Bheemante Vazhi | Dr. Cedric Simon Athikuntham | Malayalam | |
| 2024 | 3Devi | Hunter | Kannada | Also director and producer |
| 2024 | Woh Bhi Din The | Alex Sir | Hindi | |
| 2026 | I'm Game | | Malayalam | |
