= Ezhamathe Varavu =

- Film poster
- Directed by: Hariharan
- Written by: M. T. Vasudevan Nair
- Produced by: Bhavani Hariharan
- Starring: Indrajith; Vineeth; Bhavana; Mamukoya; Kavitha
- Cinematography: S. Kumar
- Edited by: Bavan Sreekumar
- Music by: Deepak Dev
- Production company: Gayathri Cinema Enterprises
- Distributed by: Kalasangham Films; Kas
- Release date: 15 September 2013
- Country: India
- Language: Malayalam

Ezhamathe Varavu (English: Seventh Arrival) is a 2013 Malayalam drama thriller film written by M. T. Vasudevan Nair and directed by Hariharan. The film stars Indrajith, Vineeth, Bhavana, and Kavitha in the lead roles while Mamukkoya and Nandu play pivotal supporting roles. The music was composed by the director himself who also produced the film under the banner of Gayatri Cinema Enterprises.

The film's script was written by M. T. Vasudevan Nair in the 1970s and was filmed by Hariharan himself in the name Evideyo Oru Sathru with veteran actor Sukumaran playing an important role (this character was donned by his son Indrajith Sukumaran in the 2013 film). However, the original film, which was buffed in the industry circles to be a trendsetter, did not get a commercial release.

== Synopsis ==
Set in the forests of Wayanad, Ezhamathe Varavu is a multilayered story that delineates the link between man and nature. It revolves around three principal characters — a planter, his wife, and his friend. Gopi, a wealthy planter is an alpha male and a hunter who assumes he knows the jungle and its creatures. Bhavana plays his long-suffering wife, who craves his company and affection. Into their turbulent marriage comes Vineeth, an archaeologist on a dig in Wayanad. He turns out to be her college beau. Kavitha plays a tribal who introduces Vineeth to the forests and its inhabitants.

== Cast ==
- Indrajith as Gopinath
- Vineeth as Prasad
- Bhavana as Bhanu
- Kavitha Nair (Mohana) as Mala
- Mamukkoya as Najaf
- Nandu as Raman Nair
- Koottickal Jayachandran as Appu, the Driver
- Santhakumari as Tribal Woman
- Suresh Krishna as Satheesh Kurup, the forest ranger
- Captain Raju as Haridas, the chief archaeologist

== Production ==
The film was shot mostly in various parts of Wayanad and Kozhikode districts in Kerala. The bungalow where the film is mostly set is located in Kinalur, near Balussery in Kozhikode district. Some parts were shot outside India as there is a ban on shooting certain wild animals, including the tiger, on film. The scenes involving the tiger were shot in Australia.
