= R. S. Vimal =

Indian filmmaker

- Born: Trivandrum, Kerala, India
- Occupations: Film director; film producer
- Years active: 2015–present

R. S. Vimal is an Indian filmmaker who works in Malayalam film industry. He made his directorial debut in 2015 with the Malayalam film Ennu Ninte Moideen, for which he received the Filmfare Award for Best Director – Malayalam.

== Career ==
He made documentary films for a Malayalam television channel for a period of time. Prior to making his feature directorial debut, Vimal made a documentary on the same subject, titled Jalam Kondu Murivettaval. He made his directorial debut in 2015 with the Malayalam film Ennu Ninte Moideen, which was based on the real-life story of Moideen and Kanchanamala that took that place in the 1960s in Mukkam, Kozhikode. The film starred Prithviraj Sukumaran and Parvathy. In January 2016, announcement of his second directorial was held at a function in Burj Al Arab, Dubai. The high-budget film titled Mahavir Karna was based on the epic Mahabharata was initially launched as a Malayalam language film with Prithviraj in the lead role. Later in the year, Vimal said that the film's budget estimate is around ₹300 crore. In 2017, for reasons unknown, Prithviraj opted out of the project and Vikram was signed in as a replacement, thus making the film a Tamil production.

== Filmography ==
Year	Film	Director	Producer	Note
2009	Jalam Kondu Murivettaval (documentary)	Yes	No	
2015	Ennu Ninte Moideen	Yes	No	
2023	Sasiyum Sakunthalayum	No	Yes	Also actor
TBA	Chethi Mandaram Thulasi †	Yes	Yes	

== Accolades ==
Year	Film	Award	Category	Result
2015	Ennu Ninte Moideen	Asianet Film Awards	Best Director	Nominated
2015	Ennu Ninte Moideen	Asianet Film Awards	Best Screenplay	Won
2015	Ennu Ninte Moideen	Filmfare Awards South	Best Director – Malayalam	Won
2015	Ennu Ninte Moideen	1st IIFA Utsavam	Best Director	Nominated
2015	Ennu Ninte Moideen	Asiavision Awards	Best Director	Won
2015	Ennu Ninte Moideen	Asiavision Awards	Best Screenplay	Won
2015	Ennu Ninte Moideen	Vanitha Film Awards	Best Director	Won
2015	Ennu Ninte Moideen	Kerala State Film Awards	Best Film with Popular Appeal and Aesthetic Value	Won
