= Vedivazhipadu =

2013 film by Shambu Purushothaman

- Theatrical poster
- Directed by: Shambhu Purushothaman
- Written by: Shambhu Purushothaman
- Produced by: Arun Kumar Aravind
- Starring: Indrajith Sukumaran; Murali Gopy; Saiju Kurup; Anumol; Mythili
- Cinematography: Shehnad Jalal
- Edited by: Prejish Prakash
- Music by: Bijibal
- Production company: Karmayug Movies
- Distributed by: Thameens Release
- Release date: 12 December 2013
- Running time: 118 minutes
- Country: India
- Language: Malayalam

Vedivazhipadu is a 2013 Indian Malayalam-language sex comedy film written and directed by Shambu Purushothaman (in his directorial debut), and produced by Arun Kumar Aravind. The cast includes Indrajith Sukumaran, Murali Gopy, Saiju Kurup, Anumol, Sreejith Ravi, Anusree and Mythili. The film was shot by Shehnad Jalal, while Bijibal provided the background score.

Vedivazhipadu depicts the events in a time frame of 24 hours on the Pongala festival day at the Attukal Temple. The film mired in controversy as the Censor Board had issues with the content and denied a censor certificate. It was later given an Adults Only Certificate by the Censor Board and released on 12 December 2013.

== Plot ==
Vedivazhipadu describe the events in a time frame of 24 hours on the Pongala festival day at the Attukal Temple. Three friends, Sanjay, Pradeep and Rahul, have made secret plans for the day when their wives will be away attending the festival. Sanjay, who is a cashier in a bank, is married to Rashmi, a bold and outgoing TV journalist who is a star in her own right. She has been covering the Pongala live for her channel. It does not take us long to guess who is the boss here. Pradeep is an investor in stocks and does his business with the help of stockbroker Joseph. Pradeep is married to Vidya, a French teacher. They are mismatched, as he looks rustic and she is sophisticated. Rahul is a geeky video games tester working from home. He is married to Radhika, a docile housewife. On the said day, the friends gather in Rahul's apartment. They have booze and a woman and plans to enjoy themselves.

== Cast ==
- Indrajith Sukumaran as Joseph
- Mythili as Vidya
- Murali Gopy as Rahul
- Sreejith Ravi as Pradeep
- Saiju Kurup as Sanjay
- Anumol as Sumitra
- Anusree as Reshmi
- Anjana Haridas as radhika
- Sunil Sukhada as Mathai
- Ashvin Mathew as PP
- Indrans as Rajappan
- Maala Parvathi as Padma
- Alencier as Swami
- Praveena
- Manka Mahesh
- Lakshmi
