= Naku Penta Naku Taka =

- Promotional Poster
- Directed by: Vayalar Madhavan Kutti
- Written by: Jeyamohan
- Produced by: Gokulam Gopalan
- Starring: Indrajith Sukumaran; Murali Gopy; Bhama
- Music by: Gopi Sundar
- Production company: Sree Gokulam Movies
- Release date: 13 June 2014
- Running time: 135 minutes
- Country: India
- Language: Malayalam

Naku Penta Naku Taka (English: I Love You I Want You) is a 2014 Malayalam-language Indian film directed by Vayalar Madhavan Kutty and produced by Gokulam Gopalan. This is the first Malayalam film shot in Kenya. It stars Indrajith Sukumaran, Bhama, Murali Gopy and Shankar.

== Plot ==
Naku Penta Naku Taka is a humorous film about a girl Subha, who dreams about marrying a person working in America, but ends up marrying a man named Vinay working in Kenya, thereby shattering her dreams. She didn't have any other choice, but to accompany her husband to Kenya. The incidents that happen in the life of the couple after they reach Kenya become the plot of the story.

Subha seems reluctant about the relationship at first, then after a few incidents they go close to each other. They have a neighbor Indu from their home town who has an abusive husband Bhadran. One night at a party at Vinay's house, Bhadran crashes the party and kidnaps Vinay's housemaid Emma. On the way the car gets into an accident and Emma dies. Incidents take a twist from there. According to Kenyan culture, if a person from their tribe is murdered they take the revenge by murdering the murderer's' family. After these incidents, Subha seemed physically disturbed.

Thus to distract Shubha from the current incidents, Vinay takes Subha on a short vacation. Unfortunately on the way, their vehicle's tyre gets punctured. When they are trying to change the tyre, the tribes too come their way. Unfortunately, in self-defense Vinay shoots a member of the tribe. From there again things go down for Vinay and Subha.

== Cast ==
- Indrajith Sukumaran as Vinay
- Murali Gopy as Anton Kulasingam
- Shankar as Balakrishna Pazhavaraveedu Parameswaran Iyer (B.K Iyer)
- Bhama as Shubha
- Anusree as Indu Bhadran
- Sunil Sukhada as Karunan
- Sudheer Karamana as Bhadran
- Raymond Ofula as Amin Owango, Kenyan Defence Minister
- Edi Gathegi as Kenyan Military Officer
- Oliver Litondo as Vinay's Bose
- Brenda Wairimu as Tribal Leader
- Pradeep Kottayam as Sreedharan
- Sasi Kalinga as Kartha
- Sethu Lakshmi as airport passenger
- Pradeep Chandran as Customs Officer
