= Mathrubhumi News =

Indian television channel

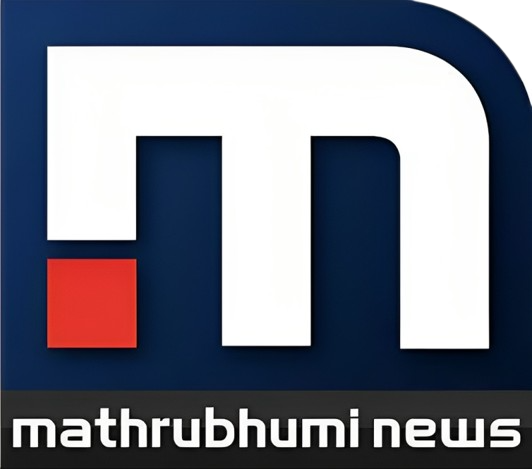
- Logo used since 2021
- Country: India
- Headquarters: Thiruvananthapuram, Kerala

Programming
- Language: Malayalam
- Picture format: 576i SDTV

Ownership
- Owner: Mathrubhumi
- Key people: M. V. Shreyams Kumar (managing director), Rajeev Devaraj (executive editor)
- Sister channels: Kappa TV

History
- Launched: 23 January 2013; 13 years ago

Links
- Webcast: tv.mathrubhumi.com
- Website: mathrubhumi.com

Mathrubhumi News is an Indian Malayalam language free to air news channel owned by Mathrubhumi. The news channel was launched on 23 January 2013, with the lighting of the traditional lamp by managing director M. P. Veerendra Kumar and managing editor P. V. Chandran. The channel underwent a brand revamp on 21 April 2021.

The old logo which was used from 23 January 2013 to 21 April 2021

== Controversy ==
In November 2025, Mathrubhumi reported a fake news story which went viral in Kerala. The story stated that Habel Anwar, a 13-year-old boy from Kerala who reportedly stopped attending school after class 2, claimed that he received a grant from the Mercatus Center at George Mason University for a paper on "white holes." Mathrubhumi News in Kerala publicised the claim, and Anwar subsequently appeared on podcasts of extreme Islamic organisations such as the Wisdom Islamic Organization. The Muslim community in Kerala]described him as the "next Isaac Newton" and a successor to A. P. J. Abdul Kalam.

Anwar later delivered talks characterised as pseudoscientific, along with religious interpretations presented under the assertion that he had been awarded US$10,000 for "breakthrough work" on white holes, expanding Albert Einstein's theories, and that he was a research scholar affiliated with the Mercatus Center at GMU. He also appeared at events organised by Islamic groups, giving lectures linking science and the Qur’an. On 27 November, the Mercatus Center released the official Emergent Ventures grant list curated by Tyler Cowen, clarifying that Anwar's grant was intended to support his preparation for the Physics Olympiad and to expand his general interest in physics, and that it was not related to any research on white holes. In an interview on the Malayalam news channel MediaOne, Anwar stated that he had purchased a gaming PC for US$4,000 out of the US$10,000 grant he received. In another public programme, he stated that he was no longer pursuing the Physics Olympiad.

Following these developments, public discussions raised questions about the credibility of Mathrubhumi News. Some users alleged that the channel had reported misleading information in exchange for money from the concerned party. These claims circulated widely on social media.
