= Kaattu =

- Theatrical release poster
- Directed by: Arun Kumar Aravind
- Written by: Ananthapadmanabhan
- Story by: Padmarajan
- Produced by: Arun Kumar Aravind
- Starring: Asif Ali; Murali Gopy; Varalaxmi Sarathkumar; Manasa Radhakrishnan
- Cinematography: Prasanth Raveendran
- Edited by: Arun Kumar Aravind
- Music by: Deepak Dev
- Production company: Karmaayug Films
- Release date: 19 October 2017
- Country: India
- Language: Malayalam

Kaattu (lit. 'Wind') is a 2017 Indian Malayalam-language period film directed and produced by Arun Kumar Aravind. It was written by Ananthapadmanabhan based on the short story by his father Padmarajan. The film is set in late 1970s, it stars Asif Ali, Murali Gopy, Varalaxmi Sarathkumar and Manasa Radhakrishnan. Kaattu was released in India on 19 October 2017 on the occasion of Diwali.

== Cast ==
- Asif Ali as Nuhukannu
- Murali Gopy as Chellappan
- Varalaxmi Sarathkumar as Muthulakshmi
- Manasa Radhakrishnan as Ummukkulsu
- Shebin Benson as Afsal
- Unni P. Dev as Pauly
- Pankan Thamarassery as Moopan
- Saritha Kukku as Kochuparvathi
- Shikha as Pauly's lover
- N. Santhanam as Nunkalaisangamam

== Production ==
The film scripted by Ananthapadmanabhan is based on his father Padmarajan's short story. The filming commenced in April 2017. The story happens in the Kerala-Tamil Nadu border set in late 1970s. The film was shot in Palakkad, Kerala. According to Aravind, the film is "a mix of many genres". Ali plays the character Nuhukannu, "we happened to make a few sketches to shape the look of Nuhukannu and it's the face of Asif Ali that came to our mind, once they were complete", said Aravind. Gopy plays the role of Chellappan, which he describes as "unapologetically characterised and has an intricate nature of its own". Varalaxmi plays Muthulakshmi, a village belle. Manasa plays the role of Ummukkulusu, "a chirpy and energetic Muslim girl" as she describes.

== Release ==
Kaattu was released in India on 13 October 2017. It was released on Netflix on 1 August 2018.

=== Reception ===
Meera Suresh of The New Indian Express wrote: "Arun Kumar Aravind proves he is good at his craft, making this drama a treat." S. R. Praveen from The Hindu wrote : "The film treads the thick line between outdated and refreshing, taking detours to both sides, but managing to finish on a strong note". Veeyen rated the film as "Good" and said: "A primitive allure that had been long lost makes a revisit through ‘Kaattu’, and it's a peculiar combo of the dismal and the lyrical that Arun Kumar Aravind comes up with in his new film. It's a complex character drama that is tonally and visually notable; a foreboding and dark tale that makes for austere viewing and told with an uncanny grace." Sanjith Sidhardhan of The Times of India gave the movie three stars out of five and stated that "It is a lesson in classical filmmaking and storytelling that develops its characters, narrates a good story and has a satisfying denouement, all without the use of any modern gimmicks."
