= Indrajith Sukumaran =

Indian actor and playback singer (born 1979)

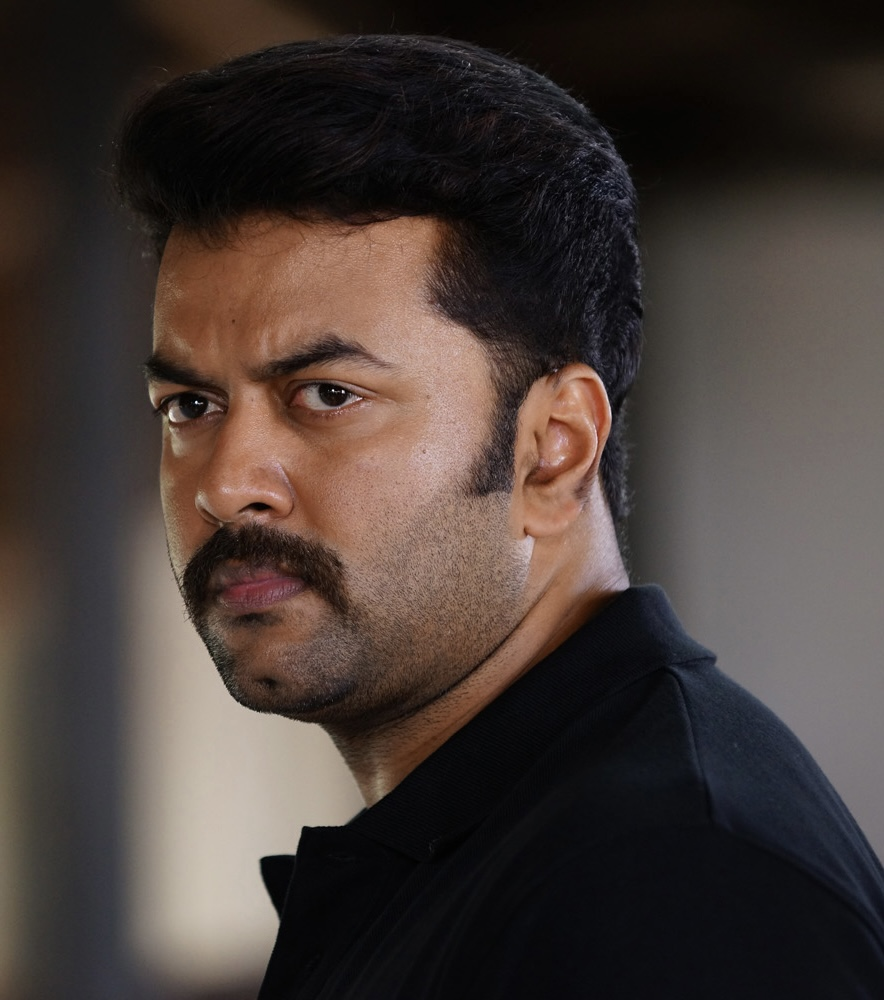
- Indrajith in 2014
- Born: 17 December 1979 (age 46); Thiruvananthapuram, Kerala, India
- Education: Sainik School, Kazhakootam
- Occupations: Actor; playback singer
- Years active: 1986 (child artist); 2002–present
- Spouse: Poornima Indrajith (m. 2002)
- Children: 2 (including Prarthana Indrajith)
- Parents: Sukumaran (father); Mallika Sukumaran (mother)
- Relatives: Prithviraj Sukumaran (brother)
- Family: See Sukumaran family

Indrajith Sukumaran (born 17 December 1979) is an Indian actor and playback singer. He primarily works in Malayalam cinema, along with acting in Tamil cinema, Telugu cinema, Hindi cinema and English to his credit. Indrajith, who began his acting career as a child artist, went on to play supporting and villain roles in Malayalam cinema. His first lead role as an actor was in the 2003 film Mizhi Randilum, directed by Ranjith.

Indrajith made his acting debut in the 1986 film Padayani as a child artist, and has gone on to star in more than 90 films. His breakthrough came with his role as the villain Eapen Pappachi in the blockbuster film Meesa Madhavan, followed by critical acclaim for his portrayal of Pious George in Classmates. He went on to appear in several lead and supporting roles, including Runway (2004), Vesham (2004), (2006), Chotta Mumbai (2007), Arabikkatha (2007), Twenty:20 (2008), Nayakan (2010), Karayilekku Oru Kadal Dooram (2010), Ee Adutha Kaalathu (2012), Amen (2013), Left Right Left (2013), Ezhamathe Varavu (2013), Angels (2014), Amar Akbar Anthony (2015), Virus (2019), Lucifer (2019), Halal Love Story (2020) and Kurup (2021).

== Early life and family ==
Indrajith was born as the elder son of actors Sukumaran and Mallika Sukumaran on 17 December 1979. His brother Prithviraj Sukumaran is also a well-known actor and director in Indian cinema.

Indrajith's initial schooling was at Shrine Vailankanni Senior Secondary School, T. Nagar, Chennai and St. Joseph's Boys School, Coonoor, since his family was settled in Tamil Nadu at the time. Later, when the family shifted to Kerala, he had his education from The NSS Public School Perunthanni, St. Mary's Residential Central School, Poojappura. He completed the rest of his schooling from Sainik School Kazhakoottam, along with his brother Prithviraj. He was the captain of the tennis team while studying there. He also participated in music and acting competitions. He pursued his bachelor's with distinction in computer science engineering from Rajaas Engineering College in Tirunelveli district and was working as a trainee in a software company when he started his film career. Later, he quit his job and became busy with movies.

== Acting career ==
He started his career in Malayalam movies as a child artist in "Padayani" in 1986. He was noted for his villain role Eappen Pappachi in the blockbuster Meesa Madhavan, directed by Lal Jose.

He acted alongside Mohanlal in Anwar Rasheed's Chotta Mumbai and Shaji Kailas's Baba Kalyani. His performance as the villain in Baba Kalyani was acclaimed by critics. He acted with Mammootty in the movie Vesham.

He also acted in Lal Jose's film Arabikkatha and Santhosh Sivan's Before the Rains. He paired with his brother Prithviraj Sukumaran in several films, including the 2006's hit film Classmates. He starred in the lead role with Vineeth in Hariharan's Film Ezhamathe Varavu, written by M. T. Vasudevan Nair after the success of Pazhassi Raja (2009).

His debut Hindi film The Waiting Room, directed by Maneej Premnath was released in 2010.

== Personal life ==
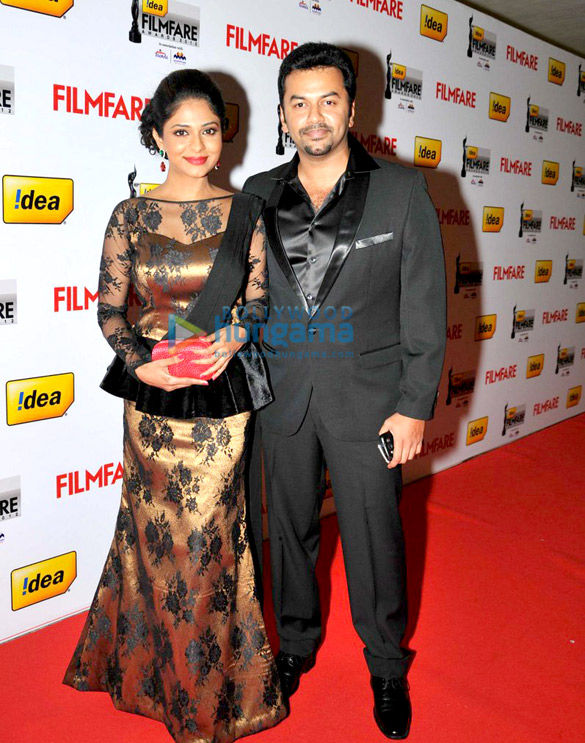
Indrajith with wife Poornima Indrajith at 60th Filmfare Awards South

On 13 December 2002, Indrajith married actress Poornima Mohan. They have two daughters.

== Awards ==
List of Awards and Nominations
Year	Award	Category	Film	Result	Ref.
2006	Kerala Film Critics Association Awards	Special Award	Classmates	Won	
2011	58th Filmfare Awards South	Best Supporting Actor – Malayalam	Elsamma Enna Aankutty	Nominated	
2013	Asiavision Awards	Outstanding Performance of the Year	Left Right Left, Amen	Won	
2014	61st Filmfare Awards South	Best Actor – Malayalam	Left Right Left	Nominated	
2014	61st Filmfare Awards South	Best Supporting Actor – Malayalam	Amen	Nominated	
2014	South Indian International Movie Awards	Best Actor in a Supporting Role	Left Right Left	Nominated	
2014	Vanitha Film Awards	Best Supporting Actor	Amen	Won	
2014	Jaihind Film Awards	The Second Best Actor	Left Right Left	Won	

== Filmography ==
=== Malayalam films ===
Key
†	Denotes films that have not yet been released

Year	Title	Role(s)	Notes
1986	Padayani	Young Ramesh	Child artist
2001	Annie		Television film
2002	Oomappenninu Uriyadappayyan	Shyam Gopal Varma	
2002	Meesa Madhavan	Eapen Pappachi	
2003	Pattalam	Nandakumar	Cameo appearance
2003	Mizhi Randilum	Dr. Arun	
2003	Mullavalliyum Thenmavum	Andrew	
2004	Runway	Balu Damodar	
2004	Vesham	Hariprasad	
2005	Finger Print	Kishore Varma	
2005	Police	Anand	
2005	Deepangal Sakshi	Rishikesh	
2005	Chanthupottu	Komban Kumaran	
2005	Krithyam	Ramdas Menon	Cameo appearance
2006	Achanurangatha Veedu	Police Officer	
2006	Classmates	Pious George	
2006	Oruvan	Sivan	
2006	Baba Kalyani	Babu	
2007	Chotta Mumbai	Tomichan	
2007	Arabikatha	Anwar	
2007	Ayur Rekha	Anand	
2007	Heart Beats	Binoy Idikkula	
2007	Hareendran Oru Nishkalankan	Hareendra Varma	
2007	Flash	Priyan	
2008	Calcutta News	Hari	
2008	Malabar Wedding	Manu Kuttan	
2008	Soorya Kireedam	Sivaram	
2008	Minnaminnikoottam	Sidharth	
2008	Twenty:20	Arun Kumar	
2009	Nammal Thammil	Johnny	
2009	Seetha Kalyanam	Ambi	
2009	Kanneerinu Madhuram	Krishnan Unni	
2010	Happy Husbands	Rahul Valiyathan	
2010	Nayakan	Varadhanunni	
2010	Elsamma Enna Aankutty	Eby	
2010	Chekavar	Kasinathan	
2010	College Days	Rohit Menon	
2010	Karayilekku Oru Kadal Dooram	Anoop Chandran	
2011	Race	Niranjan	
2011	City of God	Swarnavel	
2011	Three Kings	Bhaskaranunni Raja	
2011	Veettilekulla Vazhi	Rassaq	Cameo appearance
2011	Vellaripravinte Changathi	Manikunju	
2012	Ee Adutha Kaalathu	Vishnu	
2012	Karmayogi	Rudran Gurukkal	
2012	Outsider	Mukundan	50th film
2012	Bachelor Party	Geevarghese	
2012	Mullamottum Munthiricharum	Churatta Jose	
2012	Akasathinte Niram	Young Man	
2012	Husbands in Goa	Jerry	
2012	Poppins	Kanthan	
2013	Amen	Father Vincent Vattolli and St. George	Double role
2013	Up & Down - Mukalil Oralundu	Thampuran	
2013	Left Right Left	Jayan	
2013	Paisa Paisa	Kishore	
2013	Arikil Oraal	Siddharth	
2013	Ezhamathe Varavu	Gopinath Menon	
2013	Kaanchi	Madhavan	
2013	Vedivazhipadu	Joseph	Special appearance
2013	101 Chodyangal	Mugundan	
2014	Masala Republic	S.I. Shambu	
2014	Naku Penta Naku Taka	Vinay	
2014	Sapthamashree Thaskaraha	Krishnanunni	Cameo appearance
2014	Angels	Hameem Hyder	
2014	Cousins	Joji	
2015	Rasam	Balu	
2015	Double Barrel	Vinci	
2015	Kohinoor	Haider	Special appearance
2015	Amar Akbar Anthony	Anthony	
2016	Vettah	ACP Xylex Abraham	
2017	Kaadu Pookkunna Neram	Police officer	
2017	Lakshyam	Vimal	
2017	Tiyaan	Pattabhirama Giri and Ramaraja-1	Double role
2018	Mohanlal	Sethumadhavan	
2019	Lucifer	Govardhan	
2019	Virus	Dr. Baburaj	
2019	Thakkol	Fr. Ambrose Vas Pochampalli	
2020	Halal Love Story	Shereef	
2021	Aanum Pennum	Madhavan	Cameo appearance
2021	Kurup	SP Krishnadas IPS	
2021	Aaha	Kochu	
2022	Night Drive	Bennie Moopan	
2022	Pathaam Valavu	Sethu	
2022	19(1)(a)	Anand	
2022	Theerppu	Kalyan Menon	
2023	Thuramukham	Santo Gopalan	Cameo appearance
2023	Kunjamminis Hospital	Dr. Lyon Ilanjikkaran	
2023	Otta	Raju	
2024	Marivillin Gopurangal	Shinto	
2024	Njan Kandatha Sare	Joekuttan	
2025	L2: Empuraan	Govardhan	
2025	Mr & Mrs Bachelor	Siddharth Narayanan alias Siddhu	
2025	Dheeram	ACP Stalin Joseph IPS	
2026	Anuradha Crime No.59/2019 †	Peethambran	Completed
TBA	Ram †	TBA	Filming

=== Other language films ===
Year	Title	Role(s)	Language(s)	Notes
2002	En Mana Vaanil	Murali	Tamil	
2008	Before the Rains	Manas	English	
2009	Sarvam	Noushad	Tamil	
2009	Kavya's Diary	Raj	Telugu	
2010	The Waiting Room	Police officer	Hindi	
2025	Bandar	Lijo	Hindi	

=== Voiceover ===
- All films are in Malayalam language unless otherwise noted.

Year	Title	Voice Role	Notes
2010	Nayakan	Narrator	
2013	Nee Kho Njaa Cha	Narrator	
2013	Amen	Narrator	
2013	Zachariyaude Garbhinikal	Narrator	
2017	Ezra	Narrator	
2018	Janaki	Janaki’s Husband	Short film

== Television ==
Year	Title	Role(s)	Language(s)	Network(s)	Notes	Ref
2019	Queen	GMR	Tamil	MX Player	Debut web series	
2024	Brinda	Dr. Satya/Prof.Kabir Anand	Telugu	SonyLIV		
2024	Manorathangal	Keshav	Malayalam	ZEE5	Anthology series Segment: Kadalkkaattu	

== Discography ==
=== As singer ===
Year	Songs	Albums	Music Director	Notes
2003	"Anthinilaa"	Mullavalliyum Thenmavum	Ouseppachan	
2007	"Manjin"	Daya	---	TV Serial
2010	"Happy Husbands"	Happy Husbands	M. Jayachandran	
2010	"Ranadheera"	Nayakan	Prashant Pillai	
2010	"Poril Theyyaram"	Chekavar	Rahul Raj	
2013	"Hey Ithuvazhi"	Arikil Oraal	Gopi Sundar	Co Sing With Chithra Iyer
2014	"Kalichiri"	Masala Republic	Jassie Gift	Co Sing With Sumi Aravind
2014	"Ee Mizhiyimakal"	Angels	Jakes Bejoy	
2015	"Premamennaal"	Amar Akbar Anthony"	Nadirshah	Co Sing With Prithviraj Sukumaran, Jayasurya, Kalabhavan Shajon, Nadirsha.
2018	"Naadum vitte"	Mohanlal	Tony Joseph Pallivathukal	
2021	"Vali Oru Aaha"	Aaha	Sooraj S. Kurup	Promo Song
