= 1 by Two =

2014 film by Arun Kumar

- When the mind sings, you face the music.
- Directed by: Arun Kumar Aravind
- Written by: Jeyamohan
- Produced by: B. Rakesh
- Starring: Fahadh Faasil; Murali Gopy; Honey Rose; Abhinaya
- Narrated by: Murali Gopy
- Cinematography: Jomon Thomas
- Edited by: Prejish Prakash
- Music by: Gopi Sundar
- Production company: Universal Cinema
- Distributed by: Thameens Release
- Release date: 19 April 2014
- Running time: 150 minutes
- Country: India
- Language: Malayalam

1 by Two is a 2014 Indian Malayalam language psychological thriller film directed by Arun Kumar Aravind and written by Jeyamohan. It stars Fahadh Faasil, Murali Gopy (in a dual role), Honey Rose and Abhinaya.

== Plot ==
Hari and Ravi are identical twins who share a very special emotional bond. When Hari dies in an accident, Ravi goes into a strange state of psychosis. Yusuf, a cop, tries to uncover the mystery involved in the case.

== Cast ==
- Fahadh Faasil as Bangalore Circle Inspector Yusuf Marikkar
- Murali Gopy in a dual role as:
  - Dr. Hari Narayanan
  - Ravi Narayanan
- Honey Rose as Dr. Prema
- Abhinaya as Raziya
- Sruthi Ramakrishnan as Meghna
- Shyamaprasad as Dr. Cheriyan
- Azhagam Perumal as Narayanan Pillai
- Ashvin Mathew as Dr. Balakrishnan
- Fathima Babu as Ammukkuty Amma
- Rajesh Hebbar as Moulana Sahib
- Baby Meenakshi

== Production ==
The film was Aravind's fourth directorial venture. It was shot mainly in Bangalore, Mysore and Palakkad.
