= Ee Adutha Kaalathu =

- Theatrical release poster
- Directed by: Arun Kumar Aravind
- Written by: Murali Gopy
- Produced by: Raju Malliath
- Starring: Indrajith Sukumaran; Murali Gopy; Anoop Menon; Nishan; Miya George; Mythili; Felix Johnny Kuruvilla; Tanu Roy; Jagathy Sreekumar
- Cinematography: Shehnad Jalal
- Edited by: Arun Kumar Aravind
- Music by: Gopi Sunder
- Production company: Ragam Movies
- Distributed by: PJ Entertainments
- Release date: 24 February 2012 (India)
- Running time: 160 minutes
- Country: India
- Language: Malayalam

Ee Adutha Kaalathu (English: In Recent Times) is a 2012 Indian Malayalam-language black comedy crime thriller written by Murali Gopy and directed by Arun Kumar Aravind. The film marks the second directorial venture by Arun Kumar Aravind, after his notable directorial debut Cocktail (2010). Kerala State Award winning cinematographer Shehnad Jalal handled the camera.

The narrative is patterned like a Rubik's Cube; it's a brainy entertainer that mixes various genres. It features the lives of six different persons from different strata of the social life of the city, interconnected due to unexpected events beyond their control. Bengali model and theater artiste Tanushree Ghosh makes her debut in Malayalam cinema with this film. The cast includes Indrajith, Murali Gopy, Anoop Menon, Nishan, Jagathy Sreekumar and Mythili. The music is composed by Gopi Sundar and the lyrics are by Rafeeq Ahmed.

The film was released on 24 February 2012 in Kerala to positive reviews. The film is considered a path-breaker for its bold and realistic narration and the innovative style of weaving story threads together. It was screened at the Malayalam Cinema Today category of the 17th International Film Festival of Kerala, where it won the NETPAC Award for Best Malayalam Film. Discussions are underway for the Hindi remake of the movie.

== Premise ==
Vishnu is an unemployed man who makes toys from garbage for a living. He has a wife named Ramani, two daughters and a mother. Ajay Kurien is a rich businessman who tries to ignore his wife Madhuri, who is a former actress.

== Cast ==
- Indrajith Sukumaran as Vishnu a.k.a. Vettu Vishnu
- Murali Gopy as Ajay Kurien
- Anoop Menon as Tom Cherian
- Nishan as Rustam Bhai
- Tanu Roy as Madhuri Kurien
- Mythili as Ramani
- Lena as Roopa
- Jagathy Sreekumar as Bonacaud Ramachandran
- Baiju as Watson
- Manikandan Pattambi as Sundaram
- Miya as Shyleja
- Indrans as Babu, House broker
- Krishna Praba as Bindu
- Baby Eva as Minnu, Vishnu's daughter
- Baby Vaishnavi as Chinnu, Vishnu's daughter
- Ramzan Muhammed as Ayur
- KPAC Leelamani as Paatti
- Anitha Nair as Ratnam
- Manga Mahesh as Ramachandran's wife
- Santhakumari as Vishnu's mother
- Kalabhavan Haneef as Mammootty
- Sajitha Madathil as Madhuri's mother
- Riza Bawa as Madhuri's father
- Dinesh Panicker as Minister Kunjananthan
- Prem Prakash as Santhosh Kumar, Psychiatrist
- Gopalji as S.I. Somashekaran
- Felix Johnny Kuruvilla as Suleiman Bhai
- Biju Varkey as Vicar
- Shine Tom Chacko as Serial killer
- Dinesh Prabhakar as Trichur goon
- Vivek Gopan as prospective renter

== Production ==
The film started the shooting on 12 September 2011 at Thiruvananthapuram. The official teaser was released on 5 September, even before the commencement of shooting. The teaser has been highly appreciated for its originality, the use of Malayalam words and for the background score. The second schedule of shooting started on 28 October. Almost the whole movie was shot at Thiruvananthapuram except for few scenes which were shot at Nagercoil. The theatrical trailer was released on 27 January which became a hit in YouTube and social networking sites.

== Music ==
Ee Adutha Kaalathu

Soundtrack album by Gopi Sundar
- Recorded: Sunsa Digital Work Station, Chennai
- Genre: Feature film soundtrack
- Label: Manorama Music
- Producer: Raju Malliath

The background score of the film has been composed by Gopi Sundar. The sound track was released by Manorama Music.

All lyrics are written by Rafeeq Ahamed; all music is composed by Gopi Sundar.

No.	Title	Artist(s)	Length
1.	"Oru Vazhiyai"	Vijay Yesudas, Nayana Nair
2.	"O Ponthoovalai"	Sithara, Rahul Nambiar
3.	"Naatil Veetil"	Gopi Sundar, Anna Katharina Valayil

== Reception ==
The film was released on 24 February in 63 centers inside Kerala. The film received positive reviews from the audiences and critics alike and has become a hit. It was mostly welcomed by the youth. The positive critical response from the viewers shows the thirst of viewers for varied films, rather than star, action oriented masala films.

=== Critical response ===
Malayala Manorama called the film "A must watch movie" and commented that "By the loud, standing ovation at the end, when the lights are on, Arun Kumar can rest assured that he has established himself as a director who has once again successfully brought about the phenomenal change Malayalam cinema has ever been thirsting for".

Indiaglitz.com rated the film (3.5/5) and said that "'Ee Adutha Kalathu' is one movie that is a definite prescription for a demanding viewer. A well-made film that works for its powerful plot and structuring, engaging script, and super performances." Metromatinee.com rated the movie as "Excellent" and said "'Ee Adutha Kalathu' is a remarkably refreshing and sensitive movie making a candid statement of life in the cities".

Veeyen of Nowrunning.com rated the film (3/5) and said, "Arun Kumar Aravind's 'Ee Adutha Kaalathu' is an emotionally bruising film that is oxymoronic to the core; it's the kind of film that is pleasingly depressing, casually engrossing and placidly terrorizing. A must-watch in short!"

Paresh C. Palicha of Rediff.com gave the movie a (3/5) rating and said that "Ee Adutha Kaalathu shows the life of six different people living a city, in a very entertaining manner".

=== Accolades ===
Mohan Raghavan Foundation Awards

- Best Script - Murali Gopy

Asiavision Movie Awards

- Outstanding Movie
- Best Editor – Arun Kumar Aravind
- New Sensation in Script – Murali Gopy
- Best Anti-hero – Murali Gopy
- Outstanding Performance – Indrajith
- New Promise in Singing – Anna Katharina

International Film Festival of Kerala (2012)

- NETPAC Award for Best Malayalam Film

Nana Film Awards

- Second Best Movie
- Best Script Writer - Murali Gopy
- Second Best Actor - Indrajith
- Second Best Actress - Lena

P. Bhaskaran Foundation Awards

- Best Story - Murali Gopy

Sathyan Award

- The Best Actor - Indrajith Sukumaran

Asianet Film Awards

- The Best Editor - Arun Kumar Aravind
- The Best Villain - Murali Gopy

Vanitha Film Awards

- The Best Anti-Hero - Murali Gopy

South Indian International Movie Awards

- Pending—Best Actress in a Supporting Role - Lena
- Pending—Best Actor in a Negative Role - Murali Gopy
