= Left Right Left (film) =

- Teaser poster
- Directed by: Arun Kumar Aravind
- Written by: Murali Gopy
- Produced by: M. Renjith
- Starring: Murali Gopy; Indrajith Sukumaran; Hareesh Peradi; Lena Kumar; Remya Nambeesan
- Cinematography: Shehnad Jalal
- Edited by: Arun Kumar Aravind
- Music by: Gopi Sunder
- Production company: Rejaputhra Visual Media
- Distributed by: Rejaputhra Release
- Release date: 14 June 2013
- Running time: 163 minutes
- Country: India
- Language: Malayalam

Left Right Left is a 2013 Indian Malayalam-language political drama film, directed by Arun Kumar Aravind and written by Murali Gopy. It stars Indrajith Sukumaran, Murali Gopy, Hareesh Peradi, Lena Kumar and Remya Nambeesan. Released on 14 June 2013, the film was set in three periods – the 60s/70s, the 80s/90s and the present day. It got mostly positive reviews upon release but drew occasional criticism for some of its characters and scenes resembling real-life political leaders and incidents. However, it has gathered a cult status over the years as one of the finest political thrillers ever made in Malayalam. Murali Gopy's performance won him the 61st Filmfare Awards South for The Best Actor in a Supporting Role and Lena Kumar won Kerala State Film Award for the Second Best Actress. Filmicompanion in 2019 included Hareesh Peradi's performance in the Top 100 performances of the decade.

== Plot ==
The story revolves around P. K. Jayan aka 'Vattu' (Crazy) Jayan, Roy Joseph aka 'Che Guevera' Roy and Kaitheri Sahadevan . The film opens with formative events from their childhood - Sahadevan and Roy losing their fathers to thugs employed by their opponents (in two separate incidents), and Jayan losing his ill sister to lack of money for an operation. Jayan grows up to become a somewhat corrupt police sub inspector, Roy a communist who teaches in a school with his wife Anitha, and Sahadevan a ruthless leader of the Communist Party.

Roy and two of his friends expose a case of corruption in which Sahadevan is involved. The two friends are mysteriously murdered, while Roy is spared; purportedly because of Sahadevan's respect for Roy's father. Sahadevan tells Roy about his painful childhood, claiming that his actions are aimed at ensuring that his followers and his own children do not suffer as he and his ancestors did.

Roy's friend and neighbour Jayan grows close to Jennifer. Once, when her estranged husband assaults her, he attacks him, resulting in his death. He is placed under investigation, but learns that Sahadevan might be able to help him. Sahadevan agrees to help if he apologises to some of Sahadevan's loyalists whom he had insulted earlier. Jayan refuses.

One day, Roy collapses and is taken to a hospital. The doctor is enjoying a game of billiards with his friends, and lies that he is busy. His assistant is unable to save Roy. Anitha tells Jayan the story of their old friendship with Sahadevan, and how Roy's idealism and Sahadevan's use of violence and trickery soured the relationship. Jayan finally learns that Sahadevan had once hired goons to attack Roy, maiming him for life and eventually leading to his death. In his anger, he stabs Sahadevan, killing him. Jayan is then arrested by the police.

== Cast ==
- Indrajith Sukumaran as SI P. K. Jayan a.k.a. Vattu Jayan
- Murali Gopy as Roy Joseph a.k.a. Che Guevara Roy
  - Master Abel as Young Roy
- Hareesh Peradi as Kaitheri Sahadevan and Kaitheri Chathu
  - Master Appu as Young Sahadevan
- Lena Kumar as Anitha Roy
- Remya Nambeesan as Jennifer Kuruvilla and Ramya
- Anusree Nair as Deepa
- Sethu Lakshmi as Lathika, Jayan's mother
- Jagadish as SI Raju
- Mamukkoya as Kasim
- Vijayaraghavan as Comrade S. S.
- Baiju as Advocate Preman
- Suraj Venjaramoodu as SP Mohammed Bilal IPS
- Sudheer Karamana as Aliyar
- Saiju Kurup as Mathews
- Sreejith Ravi as Suresh Kumar B.
- Irshad as Police Constable Siddharthan
- Deepa Jayan
- Lakshmi Sanal
- Dinesh Prabhakar as Anil
- Ramesh Pisharody as Chandran, B. B. V. P. Member
- Ahamed Siddique as Jason Fernandez
- Dinesh Panicker as Dr. Vinod, Roy's Doctor
- Balaji Sarma as Hassan, Aliyar's Brother-in-law
- Poojappura Radhakrishnan as Ganeshan, House Owner
- Ram Mohan as College H. O. D.
- Krishnan as Goon.
- Krishna Prabha as Serial Actress
- Rangan as Comrade 1
- Shabu as Comrade 2
- Ganesh as Comrade 3
- Sreedhanya as Anu
- Achuthanandan as Moncy
- Master Unnikrishnan as Leo

== Production ==
Shooting began on 20 December at Thiruvananthapuram. The main locations were Thiruvananthapuram, Nagercoil and Hyderabad. The official pre-shoot teaser and theatrical trailer of the movie were a hit on YouTube. A character promo video of the movie was released, the first of its kind in a Malayalam film. The video titled 'LRL Anthem', sung by Murali Gopy, gives a glimpse of the incidents that shape the personalities and mindset of the three main characters in the movie.

=== Controversies ===
The film got numerous publicity since its release by resembling many real life characters of the Communist party. The film criticizes the degradation of the political Left in the state from a force which kicked off social revolutions to a gang that indulges in violence and elimination of dissidents, creating party villages and a building a zombie supporter base. The focus is on the three central characters – a Communist leader, a former Communist activist who is disappointed by the party's current ways and a reckless cop. There are obvious (albeit indirect) references to the differences between CPI(M) strongman Pinarayi Vijayan and ex-Chief Minister V. S. Achuthanandan. The character Kaitheri Sahdevan in the movie resembles a sketch of Mr Pinarayi Vijayan.

== Reception ==
=== Critical response ===
Left Right Left received positive reviews from critics. On the review aggregator website Rotten Tomatoes, 81% of 2 critics' reviews are positive, with an average rating of 8/10.

The Times of India rated the movie (3/5) and stated that "Loads of brilliance goes into each character. Few films have shown more intensity in depicting the effects of politics on individuals than Left Right Left." Jabir Mushthari of The Hindu found the movie to be refreshing and said, "The movie entertainingly refers to a number of issues presently faced by society even while seeking answers to certain key questions such as who is a "real communist" and what their plight is in the changing scenario." Malayala Manorama rated the movie (3/5) and called it a 'feast for discerning film connoisseurs'. Deccan Chronicle rated the movie (3.5/5). Suresh Kumar of East Coast Daily compared the movie to classics from the Golden Era of Malayalam Film.

Veeyen of Nowrunning.com rated the film (3/5) and said "'Left Right Left' has a rare, melancholic, poetic power that is magical in more ways than one. It invites the audience to delve deep beneath the rugged, craggy portrait of the society that we live in. A glorious tale on perseverance, struggles and survival, 'Left Right Left' enters the pantheon of must-see movies with grace." Sify.com rated the movie as Good. Yentha.com rated the movie (3.5/5)and said that "For anyone who is exasperated by the ragbag of 'one time watch' films now-a-days, this film is a relief." Oneindia.in stated that the movie has a hard-hitting tale, which is thought provoking and sure to start serious debate on the topic that it deals with. Webdunia.com called it the best Malayalam movie of recent times. Paresh C Palicha of Rediff.com called it a brilliant movie and said "The film can be described as intense, gritty, real, brave and most of all, honest. It depicts the degradation of politics today and tries to analyse where it all comes from, justifying the tagline 'Revolution is home made." G Krishnamurthy of Movieraga opined that Left Right Left is not a movie, but a mirror image of the political and social set up in Kerala. The iconic dialogue 'Maapu Jayan parayulla… keta? Azhi engi azhi, kayar engi kayar!' by Indrajith is used in pop culture to this day. The Left right left is considered as one of the bravest political movie in the history of malayalam film industry

== Accolades ==
Kerala State Film Award

- Second Best Actress - Lena

61st Filmfare Awards South

- The Best Actor in a Supporting Role - Murali Gopy

3rd South Indian International Movie Awards

- Best Actor in Supporting Role - Murali Gopy
- Best Fight Choreographer - Thyagarajan

Asiavision Movie Award

- Best Screenplay - Murali Gopy
- Outstanding Movie
- The New Sensation in Singing - Murali Gopy
- Outstanding Performer - Indrajith Sukumaran

Nana Film Awards

- Second Best Movie
- Man of the Year - Murali Gopy
- Best Makeup Man - Rahim Kodungallur

Thikkurissi Sukumaran Foundation Awards

- The Best Supporting Actor - Murali Gopy
- The Best Supporting Actress - Lena

Jaihind Film Awards

- The Best Script - Murali Gopy
- The Second Best Actor - Indrajith Sukumaran

== Soundtrack ==
Left Right Left

Soundtrack album by Gopi Sundar
- Released: 2013
- Genre: Feature film soundtrack
- Producer: M. Renjith

Gopi Sundar chronology
Mumbai Police (2013)	Left Right Left (2013)	ABCD (2013)

All lyrics are written by Rafeeq Ahamed; all music is composed by Gopi Sundar.

No.	Title	Artist(s)	Length
1.	"Kaal Kuzhanju" (Left Right Left Anthem)	Murali Gopy
2.	"Che Guevara Song"	Sachin Warrier, Anna Katharina Valayil
3.	"Akale"	Gopi Sundar
4.	"Mindathe"	Sachin Warrier
