= Tiyaan =

- Theatrical release poster
- Directed by: Jiyen Krishnakumar
- Written by: Murali Gopy
- Produced by: Haneef Mohammed
- Starring: Prithviraj Sukumaran; Indrajith Sukumaran
- Narrated by: Mohanlal
- Cinematography: Satheesh Kurup
- Edited by: Manoj
- Music by: Gopi Sundar
- Production company: Red Rose Creations
- Release date: 7 July 2017
- Country: India
- Language: Malayalam
- Budget: ₹9 crore

Tiyaan (lit. 'The Above Mentioned') is a 2017 Indian Malayalam socio-political fantasy action drama written by Murali Gopy and directed by Jiyen Krishnakumar. It features Prithviraj and Indrajith Sukumaran in double roles, with Gopy, Suraj Venjaramoodu, Ananya, Paris Laxmi, Rahul Madhav, Shine Tom Chacko and Padmapriya in supporting roles. The film's music is composed by Gopi Sundar. It was released on 7 July 2017 and received mixed reviews from critics.

== Plot ==
Pattabhiraman Giri is a Malayali Brahmin teacher living in the village of Ghagrawadi, Uttar Pradesh with his wife Amba and their daughter Arya. Giri's ancestors, who were followers of Adi Shankara, had constructed their house in the village several centuries prior by order of a Chola king. Giri teaches Sanskrit to schoolchildren and is well-respected by the townsfolk as a pandit. Mahashay Bhagavan, a corrupt and influential godman, arrives in Ghagrawadi hoping to take control of the village, build an ashram, and sell the surrounding land to his connections in the local land mafia. Mahashay identifies Giri's house as the ideal location for his ashram and orders him and his family to vacate their home.

Giri decides to fight against Mahashay, despite receiving a warning from an middle-aged man named Baba about the dangers involved. Baba tells Giri to look up to the nearby hills, where a fire will be lit, if he ever needs help. The next day, Arya and her schoolmates receive sweets as a gift from Mahashay. However, Arya's sweets are laced with poison by Mahashay's henchmen, and she dies at the local hospital in front of Giri and Amba. Mahashay performs a series of fake miracles, winning over Giri's friends and supporters in the village and leaving him isolated.

That night, Mahashay Bhagavan and his followers visit Giri, asking him and Amba to leave. Giri replies that whoever has the courage to kill a Brahmin can take over his land. After multiple unsuccessful attempts to intimidate Giri, Mahashay and his followers leave. The next day, a group of armed men invade the premises and assault Giri and Amba, leaving them beaten and bloodied on their front courtyard. While recovering in the hospital, Giri learns that Mahashay and his followers have occupied his house, and he is barred from returning. That night, Giri climbs to the top of the hill in search of Baba, but instead finds another man, named Jameel. Giri learns from Jameel that 'Baba' is actually Jameel's brother, Azlan Muhammad.

In a flashback to 1991, it is revealed that Azlan Muhammed was a well-respected priest, living in the slums of Behrampada in Mumbai with his Hindu wife Parineeti. One day, Azlan's sister Jaseela is molested and attacked by a local gangster named Mudassim, who ignores the warnings of his brother Khan Sahib. Mudassim whips Jaseela and her boyfriend in the streets, only for Azlan to confront and kill him. That night, Azlan dreams of fighting in a medieval battle, and rushes to help a fellow soldier on the battlefield. Meanwhile, a greedy madman, Ramnath Gujjan, promises Khan Sahib that he will kill Azlan in exchange for money. With blessings from his elder "Babaji", revealed to be Mahashay Bhagavan, Gujjan attacks Azlan and his family at night. During the attack, Azlan's sister, wife and daughter are shot and killed. Azlan is shot in the chest but survives because his heart is on the right side, and with Jameel's help, he tracks down and kills Gujjan. An infuriated Azlan confronts Khan Sahib, who whispers something to Azlan before killing himself. Azlan, devastated over the loss of his family, listens to a priest's advice and leaves Mumbai, wandering aimlessly. Several days later, Azlan is found dehydrated and unconscious in the desert by a group of mystical yogis. Azlan embarks on a pilgrimage with the yogis to different holy places, and gradually learns the true value of life and wisdom. The yogis endow him with supernatural powers, turning him into a living weapon, and instruct him to fulfill his life's purpose of dharma. In the present, Azlan meets with Giri at the top of the hill, and encourages him to continue his crusade against Mahashay.

The following day, a distraught mother runs into Mahashay Bhagvan's ashram with the dead body of her daughter, begging Mahashay to bring her back to life. It is revealed that the mother is Mahashay's former devotee, and had fed her sick daughter a pseudo-medical diet dictated by Mahashay instead of giving her the medicines prescribed by her doctor. Giri, who sits outside Mahashay's ashram and observes the scene, touches the dead body of the girl as they leave. Miraculously, the girl comes back to life. The shocked people of the village start to venerate Giri and ask for his blessings. This angers Mahashay, who fears losing his power and influence in the village. As Mahashay's troops attack Giri, Azlan arrives on the scene and channels his powers into Giri, who single-handedly defeats Mahashay's thugs. Giri is astonished by his own powers and self-transformation. That night, Mahashay slips out of his ashram, secretly meets with Azlan, and unsuccessfully attempts to bribe Azlan into leaving him alone. As Mahashay returns, he receives a frightening vision of Vasundhara Devi, his former mentor, who Mahashay had killed in order to usurp her ashram and following.

Facing pressure from his investors, Mahashay decides to stage a miracle in front of his followers in order to reassert his power and popularity. The following night, he arrives in front of the ashram and challenges Giri to prove himself and show his own powers. However, Mahashay freezes upon receiving visions of Azlan and Vansundhara Devi, and bursts into flame. The next day, Giri and Amba re-occupy their house. As Giri meets Azlan for the final time, he sees a vision of fighting alongside him in the Battle of Raichur, five hundred years ago. It is revealed that Giri and Azlan were brothers in their past life named Ramaraja.

== Cast ==
- Prithviraj Sukumaran in a dual role as
  - Azlan Muhammad, also known as Baba
  - Ramaraja
- Indrajith Sukumaran in a dual role as
  - Pattabhiraman Giri
  - Ramaraja
- Murali Gopy as Remakant aka Mahashay Bhagavan
- Ananya as Amba
- Ravi Singh as Kushal Ghorpade
- Adesh S Nair as Dalith Boy
- Mridula Sathe as Parineeti Adve
- Suraj Venjaramoodu as Jayanthan Nair
- Shine Tom Chacko as Jameel Askari
- Rahul Madhav as Anil Raghavan
- Nakshatra Indrajith as Arya Pattabhiraman Giri
- Manasa Radhakrishnan as Jaseela
- Rajat Mahajan as Vikram Singh Yadav
- Paris Laxmi as Ellen Richard
- Padmapriya as Vasundhara Devi
- Amit Tiwari as Ramnath Gujjar
- Bhavika as North Indian mother
- Mohanlal as the narrator (voiceover)
- Laksmi Priya as Kowsalya
- Ashwin Mathew as News channel head
- Ranjeet as Khan Sahib
- John Kokken as Muthassim
- Sudipto Balav as R. C. Shukla
- Remya Panicker

== Production ==
The shooting of Tiyaan started on 27 July 2016 at Ramoji Film City, Hyderabad. Additional scenes were shot at locations in Pune, Mumbai, and Nashik.

== Reception ==
The film received mixed reviews. Sanjith Sidhardhan of The Times of India rated the movie 3.5/5 and wrote "Murali delivers with an intense script packed with potent dialogues, not just in Malayalam but in Hindi and Sanskrit too. The initial half wraps a relevant take on the current religiopolitical scenario of the country as an entertainer set in a hamlet, inhabited by people of various sects, religions, and languages." In his review for Malayala Manorama, G. Ragesh said "Be it the theme or the setting, Sukumaran-brothers starring Tiyaan is an attempt to explore lesser known terrains. The film, set in a sleepy and parched village in the Hindi heartland, addresses burning issues such as sale of divinity and associated crimes, and tries to go deeper in search of the soul of Indian spirituality". Manoj Kumar R of The Indian Express rated the movie 2.5/5 and wrote: "Unless you have a stomach for a drama told in a socio-political thriller format that unfolds with backstories in an extent of nearly 2 hours 50 minutes, you may not find Tiyaan entertaining". Baradwaj Rangan of Film Companion South wrote "Tiyaan comes off like AR Murugadoss meets your average Telugu star vehicle, high-concept mumbo-jumbo fused with lowbrow pleasures. And that is valid reason for a film's being."
