= 14th Asianet Film Awards =

Indian film award ceremony in 2012

- Awarded for: Best of cinema in 2011
- Date: January 6, 2012
- Location: Dubai
- Country: India
- Presented by: Asianet

The 14th Asianet Film Awards honored the best films in 2011 and was held on 6 January 2012 at Dubai. The title sponsor of the event was Ujala.

== Awards winners ==
Category	Winner	Film /Films
Best Film	Pranayam	Pranayam
Best Director	Ranjith	Indian Rupee
Best Actor	Mohanlal	Pranayam, Snehaveedu
Best Actress	Kavya Madhavan	Khaddama, Bhaktha Janangalude Sradhakku
Best Supporting Actor	Biju Menon	Snehaveedu, Seniors, Ulakam Chuttum Valiban
Best Supporting Actress	Ananya	Dr. Love, Seniors
Best Character Actor	Innocent	Snehaveedu, Swapna Sanchari
Best Character Actress	K. P. A. C. Lalitha	Snehaveedu
Best Actor in a Villain Role	Siddique	August 15
Best Actor in a Comic Role	Suraj Venjaramoodu (Various films)	
Best Child Artist Male/Female	Master Alexander	T. D. Dasan Std. VI B
Best Script Writer	Bobby Sanjay	Traffic
Best Cinematographer	Santosh Sivan	Urumi
Best Editing	Arun Kumar	Cocktail
Best Music Director	M. Jayachandran	Pranayam, Rathinirvedam
Best Lyricist	O. N. V. Kurup	Pranayam
Best Male Playback Singer	Hariharan	Snehaveedu
Best Female Playback Singer	Shreya Ghoshal	Pranayam, Rathinirvedam
Best Feature Film on National Integration	Urmi	Urmi
Most Popular Actor	Jayaram	Seniors, Swapna Sanchari, Makeup Man
Most Popular Actress	Samvrutha Sunil	Swapna Sanchari, Manikiakkallu
Best Star Pair	Jayasurya, Bhama	Janapriyan
Youth Icon of the Year	Kunchacko Boban	Seniors, Makeup Man, Sevens, Race
Lifetime Achievement Award	Shah Rukh Khan	
Honour Special Jury Award	Jaya Prada	Pranayam

== Special awards ==
Category	Winner
Most Popular in Tamil	Dhanush
Most Popular in Hindi	Vidya Balan
Pride of Kerala in Bollywood	Asin
Asianet Golden Star Award	R. Madhavan
Cultural Icon of Kerala	Mammootty
