= 58th Filmfare Awards South =

Award ceremony for South Indian films

- Date: 2 July 2011
- Site: Hyderabad, Andhra Pradesh, India
- Hosted by: Arya and Lekha Washington
- Produced by: Idea Cellular

Highlights
- Best Picture: Jackie (Kannada); Pranchiyettan & the Saint (Malayalam); Mynaa (Tamil); Vedam (Telugu)
- Most awards: Vedam (4; Telugu)
- Most nominations: Aayirathil Oruvan (9; Tamil); Jackie (9; Kannada); Vedam, Ye Maaya Chesave (7; Telugu); Kadha Thudarunnu (7; Malayalam)

The 58th Filmfare Awards South ceremony honoring the winners and nominees of the best of South Indian cinema in 2010 was held on 2 July 2011 in Hyderabad, India.

== Nominations ==
The following is a list of the award winners and nominees.

=== Multiple nominations and awards ===
The following films received multiple nominations.

==== Kannada ====
- Nominations
  - 9 nominations: Jackie
  - 6 nominations: Aptharakshaka, Krishnan Love Story, Super
  - 4 nominations: Pancharangi
- Awards
  - 3 awards: Aptharakshaka
  - 2 awards: Jackie, Krishnan Love Story

==== Malayalam ====
- Nominations
  - 7 nominations: Kadha Thudarunnu
  - 5 nominations: Anwar, Cocktail, Elsamma Enna Aankutty, Marykkundoru Kunjaadu
  - 4 nominations: Mummy & Me, Pranchiyettan & the Saint
- Awards
  - 3 awards: Anwar, Pranchiyettan & the Saint
  - 2 awards: Kadha Thudarunnu

==== Tamil ====
- Nominations
  - 9 nominations: Aayirathil Oruvan
  - 7 nominations: Madrasapattinam, Vinnaithaandi Varuvaayaa
  - 6 nominations: Enthiran
  - 5 nominations: Angadi Theru, Paiyaa
- Awards
  - 3 awards:

Angadi Theru, Enthiran

  - 2 awards: Raavanan, Vinnaithaandi Varuvaayaa

==== Telugu ====
- Nominations
  - 7 nominations: Vedam, Ye Maaya Chesave
  - 6 nominations: Leader, Simha
  - 5 nominations: Adhurs, Brindavanam
- Awards
  - 4 awards: Vedam
  - 3 awards: Ye Maaya Chesave (2)
  - 2 awards: Khaleja

- The number in brackets after the film title indicates the number of special awards included, which have no nominees.

== Awardees ==
- The winners' names are in **bold** and mentioned at the top, followed by nominees' names.

=== Kannada ===
Best Film	Best Director
**Jackie**; Aptharakshaka; Kanasemba Kudureyaneri; Naanu Nanna Kanasu; Super	**Girish Kasaravalli – Kanasemba Kudureyaneri**; Prakash Raj – Naanu Nanna Kanasu; Shashank – Krishnan Love Story; Soori – Jackie; Upendra – Super
Best Actor	Best Actress
**Shiva Rajkumar – Thamassu**; Diganth – Pancharangi; Puneeth Rajkumar – Jackie; Sudeep – Just Math Mathalli; Upendra – Super	**Radhika Pandit – Krishnan Love Story**; Aindrita Ray – Veera Parampare; Nayantara – Super; Nidhi Subbaiah – Pancharangi; Ramya – Just Math Mathalli
Best Supporting Actor	Best Supporting Actress
**Avinash – Aptharakshaka**; Achyuth Kumar – Naanu Nanna Kanasu; Ambareesh – Veera Parampare; Biradar – Kanasemba Kudureyaneri; Rangayana Raghu – Modalasala	**Umashree – Krishnan Love Story**; Harshika Poonacha – Jackie; Lakshmi Gopalaswamy – Aptharakshaka; Ramya Barna – Pancharangi; Tara – Modalasala
Best Music Director	Best Lyricist
**V. Harikrishna – Jackie**; Guru Kiran – Aptharakshaka; Joshua Sridhar – Gaana Bajaana; Mano Murthy – Pancharangi; V. Sridhar – Krishnan Love Story	**Kaviraj – "Gharane" – Aptharakshaka**; Jayanth Kaikini – "Hrudayave" – Krishnan Love Story; K. Kalyan – "Yaari History" – Jugaari; V. Manohar – "Come On Come On Director" – Super; Yogaraj Bhat – "Shiva Antha Hogutidde" – Jackie
Best Playback Singer – Male	Best Playback Singer – Female
**S. P. Balasubrahmanyam – "Gharane" – Aptharakshaka**; Kailash Kher – "Ekka Raja" – Jackie; Sonu Nigam – "Hrudayave" – Krishnan Love Story; Tippu – "Shiva Antha" – Jackie; Upendra – "Sikka Patte" – Super	**Sunitha Upadrashta – "O Priyathama" – Cheluveye Ninne Nodalu**; Neha Kakkar – "Horage Haradide Thamassu" – Thamassu; Sadhana Sargam – Marali Mareyagi – Savaari; Shreya Ghoshal – "Eradu Jadeyannu" – Jackie; Shreya Ghoshal – "Ello" – Just Math Mathalli; Sunitha Goparaju – "Prathama" – Modalasala

=== Malayalam ===
Best Film	Best Director
**Pranchiyettan & the Saint**; Elsamma Enna Aankutty; Kadha Thudarunnu; Kutty Srank; Marykkundoru Kunjaadu	**Ranjith – Pranchiyettan & the Saint**; Lal Jose – Elsamma Enna Aankutty; Sathyan Anthikkad – Kadha Thudarunnu; Shafi – Marykkundoru Kunjaadu; Shaji N. Karun – Kutty Srank
Best Actor	Best Actress
**Mammootty – Pranchiyettan & the Saint**; Anoop Menon – Cocktail; Dileep – Marykkundoru Kunjaadu; Kunchacko Boban – Elsamma Enna Aankutty; Prithviraj Sukumaran – Anwar	**Mamta Mohandas – Kadha Thudarunnu**; Archana Jose Kavi – Mummy & Me; Kavya Madhavan – Paappi Appacha; Priyamani – Pranchiyettan & the Saint; Samvrutha Sunil – Cocktail
Best Supporting Actor	Best Supporting Actress
**Biju Menon – Marykkundoru Kunjaadu**; Jayasurya – Cocktail; Indrajith – Elsamma Enna Aankutty; Lal – Anwar; Suresh Krishna – Kutty Srank	**Urvashi – Mummy & Me**; KPAC Lalitha – Elsamma Enna Aankutty; Lakshmi Gopalaswamy – Shikkar; Lakshmi Priya – Kadha Thudarunnu; Vinaya Prasad – Marykkundoru Kunjaadu
Best Music Director	Best Lyricist
**Gopi Sunder – Anwar**; Ilaiyaraaja – Kadha Thudarunnu; M. G. Sreekumar – Oru Naal Varum; M. Jayachandran – Shikkar; Ouseppachan – Aagathan	**Rafeeque Ahmed – "Kizhakku Pookkum" – Anwar**; Anil Panachooran – "Neeyam Thanalin" – Cocktail; Kaithapram – "Manju Mazha" – Aagathan; Murukan Kattakada – "Maavin Chuvattil" – Oru Naal Varum; Sarathchandra Varma – "Aro Padunnu" – Kadha Thudarunnu
Best Playback Singer – Male	Best Playback Singer – Female
**Hariharan – "Aaro Padunnu" – Kadha Thudarunnu**; K. J. Yesudas – "Ennodonnum Parayathe" – Shikkar; Madhu Balakrishnan – "Manjin Velli" – Paappi Appacha; Rahul Nambiar – "Ven Mukilin" – Mummy & Me; Vijay Yesudas – "Neeyam Thanal" – Cocktail	**Shreya Ghoshal – "Kizhakku Pookkum" – Anwar**; K. S. Chithra – "Malakha Pole" – Mummy & Me; Shreya Ghoshal – "Manju Mazhakkattil" – Aagathan; Shweta Mohan – "Maavin Chuvatile" – Oru Naal Varum; Sujatha Mohan – "Pachila Charthan" – Karayilekku Oru Kadal Dooram

=== Tamil ===
Best Film	Best Director
**Mynaa**; Aayirathil Oruvan; Angadi Theru; Enthiran; Madrasapattinam; Vinnaithaandi Varuvaayaa	**Vasanthabalan – Angadi Theru**; A. L. Vijay – Madrasapattinam; Gautham Vasudev Menon – Vinnaithaandi Varuvaayaa; Prabu Solomon – Mynaa; Selvaraghavan – Aayirathil Oruvan; S. Shankar – Enthiran
Best Actor	Best Actress
**Vikram – Raavanan**; Arya – Madrasapattinam; Karthi – Aayirathil Oruvan; Rajinikanth – Enthiran; Silambarasan – Vinnaithaandi Varuvaayaa; Suriya – Singam	**Anjali – Angadi Theru**; Amala Paul – Mynaa; Nayantara – Boss Engira Bhaskaran; Reemma Sen – Aayirathil Oruvan; Tamannaah Bhatia – Paiyaa; Trisha Krishnan – Vinnaithaandi Varuvaayaa
Best Supporting Actor	Best Supporting Actress
**Parthiban – Aayirathil Oruvan**; Madhavan – Manmadan Ambu; Prakash Raj – Singam; Prithviraj Sukumaran – Raavanan; Santhanam – Boss Engira Bhaskaran; Thambi Ramaiah – Mynaa	**Saranya Ponvannan – Thenmerku Paruvakaatru**; Andrea Jeremiah – Aayirathil Oruvan; Carole Palmer – Madrasapattinam; Manorama – Singam; Sangeetha – Manmadan Ambu
Best Music Director	Best Lyricist
**A. R. Rahman – Vinnaithaandi Varuvaayaa**; A. R. Rahman – Enthiran; G. V. Prakash Kumar – Aayirathil Oruvan; G. V. Prakash Kumar – Madrasapattinam; Yuvan Shankar Raja – Naan Mahaan Alla; Yuvan Shankar Raja – Paiyaa	**Thamarai – "Mannipaya" – Vinnaithaandi Varuvaayaa**; Na. Muthukumar – "Aval Appadi" – Angadi Theru; Na. Muthukumar – "Vamma Duraiyamma" – Madrasapattinam; Vairamuthu – "Kaadhal Anukkal" – Enthiran; Vairamuthu – "Usure Poguthey" – Raavanan
Best Playback Singer – Male	Best Playback Singer – Female
**Karthik – "Usure Poguthey" – Raavanan**; Dhanush – "Un Mela Aasathan" – Aayirathil Oruvan; Rahul Nambiar – "Adada Mazhada" – Paiyaa; Udit Narayan – "Vaama Duraiyamma" – Madrasapattinam; Vijay Prakash – "Hosanna" – Vinnaithaandi Varuvaayaa; Yuvan Shankar Raja – "Iragai Pole" – Naan Mahaan Alla	**Shreya Ghoshal – "Un Perai Sollum" – Angadi Theru**; Andrea Jeremiah & Aishwarya Dhanush – "Un Mela Aasathan" – Aayirathil Oruvan; Chinmayi – "Kilimanjaro" – Enthiran; Saindhavi – "Adada Mazhada" – Paiyaa; Suchitra – "En Idhayam" – Singam

=== Telugu ===
Best Film	Best Director
**Vedam**; Adhurs; Brindavanam; Leader; Simha; Ye Maaya Chesave	**Radhakrishna Jagarlamudi – Vedam**; Boyapati Srinu – Simha; Gautham Vasudev Menon – Ye Maaya Chesave; Sekhar Kammula – Leader; Vamsi Paidipally – Brindavanam; V. V. Vinayak – Adhurs
Best Actor	Best Actress
**Allu Arjun – Vedam**; Balakrishna – Simha; Jr. NTR – Adhurs; Jr. NTR – Brindavanam; Naga Chaitanya – Ye Maaya Chesave; Rana Daggubati – Leader	**Anushka Shetty – Vedam**; Anushka Shetty – Nagavalli; Kajal Aggarwal – Darling; Nayantara – Simha; Samantha – Ye Maaya Chesave
Best Supporting Actor	Best Supporting Actress
**Sai Kumar – Prasthanam**; Allari Naresh – Shambo Shiva Shambo; Brahmanandam – Adhurs; Naresh – Andari Bandhuvaya; Shafi – Khaleja	**Abhinaya – Shambo Shiva Shambo**; Ramya Krishnan – Ranga The Donga; Roja – Golimaar; Saranya Ponvannan – Komaram Puli; Suhasini Maniratnam – Leader
Best Music Director	Best Lyricist
**A. R. Rahman – Ye Maaya Chesave**; Devi Sri Prasad – Adhurs; Harris Jayaraj – Orange; M. M. Keeravani – Vedam; Mickey J Meyer – Leader; Sekhar Chandra – Manasara	**Ramajogayya Sastry – "Sada Siva Sanyasi" – Khaleja**; Anantha Sreeram – "Vintunava" – Ye Maaya Chesave; Bhaskarabhatla Ravi Kumar – "Gundello Edo Sadi" – Golimaar; Sirivennela Sitaramasastri – "Now Or Never" – Vedam; Vanamali – "Nenu Nuvantu" – Orange
Best Playback Singer – Male	Best Playback Singer – Female
**Ramesh Vinayagam & N. C. Karunya – "Sada Shiva Sanyasi" – Khaleja**; Hariharan – "Bangaru Konda" – Simha; Karthik – "Nijamena" – Brindaavanam; Naresh Iyer – "Nenu Nuvvantu" – Orange; Vijay Prakash – "Ee Hrudayam" – Ye Maaya Chesave	**Geetha Madhuri – "Magallu" – Golimaar**; Kousalya – "Bangaru Konda" – Simha; Suchitra – "Nijamena" – Brindavanam; Sunitha – "Egiripothe" – Vedam; Sunitha Sarathy – "Hey CM" – Leader

=== Other awards ===
(No nominees for these awards)

- **Critics Best Film** – **Deva Katta** – **Prasthanam** (Telugu)
- Best Female Debutant: **Samantha** – Ye Maaya Chesave (Telugu)
- Best Male Debutant: **Rana Daggubati** – Leader (Telugu)
- **Best Choreography**:
  - **Baba Bhaskar** – "Kadhal Vandhale" – Singam (Tamil)
  - **Raju Sundaram** – "Eyi Raaja" – Brindavanam (Telugu)
- Best Cinematographer:
  - **R. Rathnavelu** – Enthiran (Tamil)
  - **Manoj Paramahamsa** – Ye Maaya Chesave (Telugu)
- Best Costume Design: **Manish Malhotra** – Enthiran (Tamil)
- Best Production Design: **Sabu Cyril** – Enthiran (Tamil)
- Lifetime Achievement Award:
  - **Chiranjeevi**
  - **Jayasudha**

== See also ==
- Filmfare Awards South
- Filmfare Awards
- 2010 in film
