= Asianet Film Awards =

Indian Malayalam cinema Awards from 1998 till 2020

- 2020
- Awarded for: Excellence in cinematic achievements in Malayalam cinema
- Country: India
- Presented by: Asianet TV Channel
- First award: 1998
- Website: http://asianetfilmawards.com/

The Asianet Film Awards is an award ceremony for films presented annually by Asianet, a Malayalam-language television network from the Indian state of Kerala. According to Asianet, the ceremony was instituted to honour artistic and technical excellence in the Malayalam film industry.

== History ==
The awards ceremony was co-sponsored by Johnson & Johnson in 1998. Lux took up the sponsorship for the next five years. Jiva soap was the sponsor in 2004, and then Ujala for many years. Since 2016, the function has been sponsored by Nirapara. Bhima Jewellers was the title sponsor for the 2018 event.

The ceremony is usually held in the Kerala cities of Kochi, Angamaly and Thiruvananthapuram. It has also been held twice in Dubai.

== Ceremonies ==
Ceremony	Date	Host(s)	Venue	City	Country	Ref.
12th Asianet Film Awards	January 16, 2010		Chandrasekharan Nair Stadium	Thiruvananthapuram	India	
13th Asianet Film Awards	January 9, 2011		Willingdon Island	Kochi	India	
14th Asianet Film Awards	January 6, 2012			Dubai	UAE	
15th Asianet Film Awards	January 20, 2013		Willingdon Island	Kochi	India	
16th Asianet Film Awards	January 10, 2014		Meydan Hotel & Grand Stand	Dubai	UAE	
17th Asianet Film Awards	January 11, 2015		Kochi Port Trust Stadium, Willingdon Island	Kochi	India	
20th Asianet Film Awards	May 20, 2018	Jewel Mary	Adlux Convention Center	Angamaly	India	
21st Asianet Film Awards	April 6 & 7, 2019	Nyla Usha, Govind Padmasoorya, Prathibha Sai	FACT Sports Association Ground, Kalamassery	Kochi	India	
22nd Asianet Film Awards	February 29 & March 1, 2020	Jewel Mary	Adlux Convention Center	Angamaly	India	

== Awards for film ==
=== Best Film ===
The Asianet Film Award for Best Film has been awarded since 1998.

Year	Winner	Producer
1998	Chinthavishtayaya Shyamala	C. Karunakaran
1999	Veendum Chila Veettukaryangal	P. V. Gangadharan
2000	Narasimham	Antony Perumbavoor
2001	Meghamalhar	M. V. Shreyams Kumar
2002	Nandanam	Siddique
2003	Ente Veedu Appuvinteyum	Prem Prakash
2004	Kaazcha	Noushad Xavy and Manoj Mathew
2005	Achuvinte Amma	P. V. Gangadharan
2006	Classmates	P. K. Muraleedharan and Prakash Harikrishnan
2007	Kadha Parayumbol	Sreenivasan and Mukesh
2008	Twenty 20	Dileep
2009	Pazhassi Raja	Gokulam Gopalan
2010	Pranchiyettan and the Saint	Ranjith
2011	Pranayam	P. K. Sajeev and Anne Sajeev
2012	Ustad Hotel	Listin Stephen
2013	Drishyam	Antony Perumbavoor
2014	Iyobinte Pusthakam	Amal Neerad and Fahadh Faasil
2015	Ennu Ninte Moideen	Suresh Raj, Binoy Shankarath and Ragy Thomas
2016	Oppam	Antony Perumbavoor
2017	Thondimuthalum Driksakshiyum	Sandip Senan and Anish M. Thomas
2018	Sudani From Nigeria	Sameer Thahir and Shyju Khalid
2019	Uyare	Manu Ashokan

=== Most Popular Film ===
The Asianet Film Award for Most Popular Film has been awarded since 2012.

Year	Film	Director
2012	Spirit	Ranjith
2013	Drishyam	Jeethu Joseph
2014	Bangalore Days	Anjali Menon
2015	Premam	Alphonse Putharen
2016	Pulimurugan	Vysakh
2017	Take Off	Mahesh Narayan
2017	Aadu 2	Midhun Manuel Thomas
2018	Kayamkulam Kochunni	Rosshan Andrrews
2019	Thanneer Mathan Dinangal	Girish A.D

== Awards for best actors & actresses ==
=== Best Actor ===
The Asianet Film Award for Best Actor has been awarded since 1998.

Year	Winner	Film(s)
1998	Jayaram	Sneham
1999	Kalabhavan Mani	Vasantiyum Lakshmiyum Pinne Njanum
2000	Mammootty	Arayannagalude Veedu
2001	Jayaram	Theerthadanam
2002	Dileep	Kunjikoonan, Meesa Madhavan, Kalyanaraman
2003	Mohanlal	Balettan
2004	Mammootty	Kaazhcha, Vesham
2005	Mohanlal	Thanmathra, Naran
2006	Mohanlal	Kirtichakra, Rasathanthram, Vadakkumnathan, Mahasamudram
2007	Mammootty	Ore Kadal, Big B, Kadha Parayumbol
2008	Mohanlal	Madampi
2009	Mohanlal	Evidam Swargamanu, Bhramaram
2010	Mammootty	Pranchiyettan and the Saint, Kutty Srank, Best Actor, Pokkiri Raja
2011	Mohanlal	Pranayam, Snehaveedu, Christian Brothers, China Town
2012	Mohanlal	Spirit, Run Babby Run, Grand Master
2013	Mammootty	Kunjananthante Kada
2014	Mammootty	Varsham, Munnariyippu
2015	Prithviraj Sukumaran	Ennu Ninte Moideen, Amar Akbar Anthony
2016	Mohanlal	Pulimurugan, Oppam
2017	Fahadh Faasil	Thondimuthalum Driksakshiyum, Role Models
2018	Mohanlal	Odiyan
2019	Mohanlal	Lucifer

=== Best Actress ===
The Asianet Film Award for Best Actress has been awarded since 1998.Manju warrier won 5 awards.

Year	Winner	Film(s)
1998	Manju Warrier	Kanmadam
1999	Manju Warrier	Kannezhuthi Pottum Thottu, Pathram
2000	Samyuktha Varma	Mazha, Madhuranombarakattu
2001	Samyuktha Varma	Meghamalhar
2002	Kavya Madhavan	Oomappenninu Uriyadappayyan, Meesa Madhavan
2002	Navya Nair	Nandanam, Kalyanaraman
2003	Meera Jasmine	Paadam Onnu: Oru Vilapam
2004	Meera Jasmine	Perumazhakkalam
2005	Meera Jasmine	Achuvinte Amma
2006	Padmapriya	Karutha Pakshikal, Vadakkumnadhan
2007	Meera Jasmine	Ore Kadal, Vinodayathra
2008	Gopika	Veruthe Oru Bharya
2009	Kavya Madhavan	Banaras
2010	Nayantara	Body Guard
2011	Kavya Madhavan	Khaddama, Bhaktha Janangalude Sradhakku, China Town
2012	Kavya Madhavan	Bavuttiyude Namathil
2013	Amala Paul	Oru Indian Pranayakatha
2014	Manju Warrier	How Old Are You
2015	Parvathy Thiruvothu	Ennu Ninte Moideen, Charlie
2016	Manju Warrier	Vettah
2017	Parvathy Thiruvothu	Take Off
2018	Manju Warrier	Aami, Odiyan
2019	Parvathy Thiruvothu	Uyare, Virus

Note: Meera Jasmine is the only actress who has won the award three times in a row.

=== Multiple wins ===
The following individuals have received two or more Best Actress awards:

Wins	Actress
5	Manju Warrier
4	Kavya Madhavan, Meera Jasmine
3	Parvathy Thiruvothu
2	Samyuktha Varma

=== Most Popular Actor ===
The Asianet Film Award for Most Popular Actor has been awarded since 2007. Priviraj Sukumaran has won the award three times.

Year	Film	Director
2007	Mohanlal	Hallo, Chotta Mumbai
2008	Jayaram	Veruthe Oru Bharya
2009	Not awarded	
2010	Dileep	Body Guard, Pappy Appacha, Kaaryasthan, Marykkundoru Kunjaadu
2011	Jayaram	Seniors, Swapna Sanchari, Makeup Man
2012	Prithviraj Sukumaran	Hero, Ayalum Njanum Thammil
2013	Prithviraj Sukumaran	Various films
2014	Biju Menon	Vellimoonga
2015	Nivin Pauly	Premam
2016	Nivin Pauly	Jacobinte Swargarajyam
2017	Jayasurya	Aadu 2, Punyalan Private Limited
2018	Prithviraj Sukumaran	Koode, Ranam

=== Most Popular Actress ===
The Asianet Film Award for Most Popular Actress has been awarded since 2009.

Year	Film	Director
2009	Raai Laxmi	Evidam Swargamanu
2010	Mamta Mohandas	The Thriller, Anwar
2011	Samvrutha Sunil	Swapna Sanchari, Manikiakkallu
2012	Mamta Mohandas	My Boss, Arike
2013	Namitha Pramod	Sound Thoma, Pullipulikalum Aattinkuttiyum
2014	Nazriya Nazim	Om Shanthi Oshaana
2015	Not awarded	
2016	Sai Pallavi	Kali
2017	Anu Sithara	Ramante Edanthottam
2017	Prayaga Martin	Ramaleela
2018	Aishwarya Lekshmi	Varathan

=== Best Supporting Actor ===
The Asianet Film Award for Best Supporting Actor has been awarded since 1998.

Year	Winner	Film(s)
1998	Unknown recipient	
1999	Biju Menon	Pathram, Kannezhuthi Pottum Thottu
2000	Biju Menon	Cover Story, Millennium Stars
2001	Innocent	Ravanaprabhu
2002	Jagathy Sreekumar	Meesa Madhavan
2003	Not awarded	
2004	Innocent	Vesham
2005	Nedumudi Venu	Thanmathra
2006	Unknown recipient	
2007	Jagathy Sreekumar	Rock n' Roll, Hallo
2008	Innocent	Innathe Chintha Vishayam
2009	Sreenivasan	Makante Achan, Passenger
2010	Nedumudi Venu	Kadha Thudarunnu, Best Actor
2011	Innocent	Snehaveedu, Swapna Sanchari
2012	Shankar Ramakrishnan	Spirit, Bavuttiyude Namathil
2013	Siddique	Drishyam
2014	Tini Tom	Vellimoonga
2015	Sai Kumar	Ennu Ninte Moideen
2016	Renji Panicker	Jacobinte Swargarajyam
2017	Alencier Ley Lopez	Thondimuthalum Driksakshiyum
2018	Siddique	Hey Jude
2019	Siddique	Uyare

=== Best Supporting Actress ===
The Asianet Film Award for Best Supporting Actress has been awarded since 1998.

Year	Winner	Film(s)
1998	Sukumari	Samaantharangal
1999	Praveena	Vasantiyum Lakshmiyum Pinne Njanum
2000	K. P. A. C. Lalitha	Various
2001	Bindu Panicker	Narendra Makan Jayakanthan Vaka
2002	Bhavana	Nammal
2003	Not awarded	
2004	Gopika	Vesham
2005	Bhavana	Daivanamathil
2006	Sukumari	Various
2007	K. P. A. C. Lalitha	Thaniye, Nasrani
2008	Samvrutha Sunil	Minnaminnikoottam
2009	Shwetha Menon	Paleri Manikyam: Oru Pathirakolapathakathinte Katha
2010	Lakshmi Priya	Kadha Thudarunnu
2011	K. P. A. C. Lalitha	Snehaveedu
2012	Lena	Spirit
2013	Asha Sarath	Drishyam
2014	Parvathy Thiruvothu	Bangalore Days
2015	Kalpana	Charlie
2016	Sethu Lakshmi	Pulimurugan, Annmariya Kalippilannu
2017	Srinda Arhaan	Njandukalude Nattil Oridavela, Munthirivallikal Thalirkkumbol
2018	Savithri Sreedharan & Sarasa Balussery	Sudani From Nigeria
2019	Grace Antony	Kumbalangi Nights

=== Best Character Actor ===
The Asianet Film Award for Best Character Actor has been awarded since 2010.

Year	Winner	Film(s)
2010	Innocent	Kadha Thudarunnu
2011	Biju Menon	Snehaveedu, Seniors, Ulakam Chuttum Valiban
2012	Biju Menon	Run Baby Run, Ordinary
2013	Nedumudi Venu	North 24 Kaatham
2014	Anoop Menon	1983
2015	Biju Menon	Anarkali, Madhura Naranga
2016	Biju Menon	Anuraga Karikkin Vellam
2017	Suraj Venjaramoodu	Thondimuthalum Driksakshiyum
2018	Suraj Venjaramoodu	Kuttanpillayude Sivarathri, Theevandi, Njan Marykutty
2019	Vijayaraghavan	Porinju Mariam Jose

=== Best Character Actress ===
The Asianet Film Award for Best Character Actress has been awarded since 2010.

Year	Winner	Film(s)
2006	Radhika	Classmates
2007	Not awarded	
2008	Samvrutha Sunil	Minnaminnikoottam
2009	Shweta Menon	Paleri Manikyam: Oru Pathirakolapathakathinte Katha
2010	Samvrutha Sunil	Cocktail
2011	Ananya	Dr. Love, Seniors
2012	Shweta Menon	Ozhimuri
2013	Meena	Drishyam
2014	Asha Sarath	Varsham
2015	Lena	Ennu Ninte Moideen
2016	Anusree	Maheshinte Prathikaaram
2017	Shanthi Krishna	Njandukalude Nattil Oridavela
2018	Anusree	Aadhi
2019	Rajisha Vijayan	Finals, Stand Up

=== Best Actor in a Negative Role ===
The Asianet Film Award for Best Villain Role has been awarded since 2006.

Year	Winner	Film(s)
2006	Siddique	Bada Dosth, Prajapathi
2007	Kalabhavan Mani	Chotta Mumbai
2008	Siddique	Madampi
2009	Lalu Alex	Evidam Swargamanu
2010	Asif Ali	Apoorvaragam
2011	Siddique	August 15
2012	Asif Ali	Ordinary
2013	Kalabhavan Shajon	Drishyam
2014	Jayasurya	Iyobinte Pusthakam
2015	Nedumudi Venu	Oru Second Class Yathra, Rudra Simhasanam
2016	Jagapathi Babu	Pulimurugan
2017	Vijayaraghavan	Ramaleela, Punyalan Private Limited
2019	Vivek Oberoi	Lucifer

=== Best Actor in a Humorous Role ===
The Asianet Film Award for Best Comic Role has been awarded since 2006.

Year	Winner	Film(s)		
2006	Innocent	Rasathanthram, Yes Your Honour		
2007	Jagathy Sreekumar	Hello		
2008	Saleem Kumar	Annan Thambi		
2009	Jagadish	2 Harihar Nagar		
2010	Suraj Venjaramoodu	Pokkiri Raja, Happy Husbands, Kaaryasthan		
2011	Suraj Venjaramoodu	Pokkiri Raja, Happy Husbands, Kaaryasthan	Suraj Venjaramoodu	Christian Brothers, China Town, Seniors
2012	Baburaj	Mayamohini	Suraj Venjaramoodu	Christian Brothers, China Town, Seniors
2013	Biju Menon	Romans	Suraj Venjaramoodu	
2014	Suraj Venjaramood	Cousins		
2015	Aju Varghese	Adi Kapyare Kootamani, Oru Vadakkan Selfie, Kunjiramayanam, Two Countries		
2016	Sharaf U Dheen	Happy Wedding, Paavada		
2017	Dharmajan Bolgatty	Various films		
2018	Hareesh Kanaran	Various films		
2019	Hareesh Kanaran	Various films		
2019	Dharmajan Bolgatty	Various films		

=== Best New Face of the Year (Male) ===
The Asianet Film Award for Best New Face of the Year - Male has been awarded since 2005.

Year	Winner	Film(s)
2005	Arjun Lal	Thanmathra
2006	Skanda Ashok	Notebook
2007	Rejith Menon	Goal
2008	Vineeth Sreenivasan	Cycle
2009	Nishan Nannaiah	Ritu
2010	Nivin Pauly	Malarvaadi Arts Club
2011	Unni Mukundan	Bombay March 12
2012	Not awarded	
2014	Farhaan Faasil	Njan Steve Lopez
2015	Not awarded	
2016	Gokul Suresh	Mudhugauv
2017	Appani Sarath	Angamaly Diaries
2018	Kalidas Jayaram	Poomaram
2019	Not awarded	

=== Best New Face of the Year (Female) ===
The Asianet Film Award for Best New Face of the Year - Female has been awarded since 2001.

Year	Winner	Film(s)
1999	Samyuktha Varma	Veendum Chila Veettukaryangal
2001	Nithya Das	Ee Parakkum Thalika
2002	Jyothirmayi	Meesa Madhavan
2003	Nayantara	Manassinakkare
2004	Padmapriya Janakiraman	Kaazhcha
2005	Meera Vasudevan	Thanmathra
2006	Roma	Notebook
2007	Lakshmi Rai	Rock n' Roll
2008	Meera Nandan	Mulla
2009	Archana Jose Kavi	Neelathaamara
2010	Ann Augustine	Elsamma Enna Aankutty
2011	Richa Panai	Vaadamalli
2012	Gauthami Nair	Second Show
2013	Keerthy Suresh	Geethanjali
2014	Nikki Galrani	Vellimoonga, 1983
2015	Deepti Sati	Nee-Na
2016	Aparna Balamurali	Maheshinte Prathikaaram
2017	Aishwarya Lekshmi	Njandukalude Nattil Oridavela
2018	Neeta Pillai	Poomaram
2019	Anna Ben	Kumbalangi Nights

=== Best Star Pair ===
The Asianet Film Award for Best Star Pair has been awarded since 2001.

Year	Winner(s)	Film(s)
2001	Biju Menon and Samyuktha Varma	Meghamalhar
2002	Dileep and Kavya Madhavan	Meesa Madhavan
2006	Jeeva and Gopika	Keerthichakra
2007	Vinu Mohan and Bhama	Nivedyam
2008	Jayasurya and Roma	Minnaminnikoottam, Shakespeare M.A. Malayalam
2009	Jayasurya and Roma	Utharaswayamvaram
2010	Kunchacko Boban and Archana Kavi	Mummy & Me
2011	Asif Ali and Mythili	Salt N' Pepper
2012	Nivin Pauly and Isha Talwar	Thattathin Marayathu
2013	Nivin Pauly and Nazriya Nazim	Neram
2014	Vineeth Sreenivasan and Namitha Pramod	Ormayundo Ee Mukham
2015	Not awarded	
2016	Asif Ali and Rajisha Vijayan	Anuraga Karikkin Vellam
2017	Neeraj Madhav and Reba Monica John	Paippin Chuvattile Pranayam
2018	Shane Nigam and Nimisha Sajayan	Eeda
2019	Mathew Thomas and Anaswara Rajan	Thanneer Mathan Dinangal

=== Youth Icon of the Year ===
The Asianet Film Award for Best Youth Icon of the year has been awarded since 2009. Nivin Pauly and Kunchacko Boban holds the record of most wins, with two.

Year	Winner(s)	Film(s)
2009	Prithviraj	Puthiya Mukham
2010	Jayasurya	Happy Husbands, Cocktail, Nallavan, Four Friends
2011	Kunchacko Boban	Seniors, Doctor Love, Sevens, Race
2012	Fahadh Faasil	Padmasree Bharat Dr. Saroj Kumar, 22 Female Kottayam, Diamond Necklace
2013	Nivin Pauly	Neram
2014	Kunchacko Boban	Various films
2015	Nivin Pauly	Various films
2016	Vineeth Sreenivasan	Various films
2017	Antony Varghese	Angamaly Diaries
2018	Not awarded	
2019	Unni Mukundan	Mamangam

=== Best Child Artist (Male/Female) ===
The Asianet Film Award for Best Child Artist (Male/Female) has been awarded since 2001. Baby Nivedita, Baby Anikha and Kalidas Jayaram hold the record of most wins, with two.

Year	Winner	Film(s)
2000	Master Aswin Thampy	Saaphalyam
2000	Baby Sanika	Garshom
2001	Master Kalidas	Kochu Kochu Santhoshangal
2001	Baby Manjima	Madhuranombarakattu
2002	Master Vighnesh	Pularvettam
2002	Master Appu	Mookkuthy
2003	Master Kalidas	Ente Veedu Appoontem
2004	Baby Sanusha	Kaazhcha
2004	Master Yash	Kaazhcha
2005	Baby Niranjana	Naran, Thanmathra, Bharatchandran IPS
2006	Baby Malavika	Karutha Pakshikal
2006	Master Rohith	Prajapathi
2007	Master Ganapathi	Vinodayathra
2008	Baby Niveditha	Innathe Chintha Vishayam
2009	Baby Niveditha	Bhramaram, Kaana Kanmani
2010	Baby Anikha	Kadha Thudarunnu
2010	Master Alexander	T D Dasan Std VI B
2011	Master Ananthapathmanathan	Rathinirvedam
2012	Master Dhananjay	Trivandrum Lodge
2013	Master Sanoop	Philips and the Monkey Pen
2014	Amritha Anil	How Old Are You
2015	Baby Meenakshi	Amar Akbar Anthony
2016	Master Rudraksh	Kochavva Paulo Ayyappa Coelho
2017	Baby Anikha	The Great Father
2018	Not awarded	
2019	Master Achuthan	Mamangam

== Technical awards ==
=== Best Director ===
The Asianet Film Award for Best Director has been awarded since 1998.

Year	Winner	Film(s)
1998	Sreenivasan	Chinthavishtayaya Shyamala
1999	Shyama Prasad	Agnisakshi
2000	Shaji Kailas	Narasimham
2001	Kamal	Meghamalhar
2002	Jayaraj	Kannaki
2003	Sathyan Anthikkad	Manassinakkare
2004	Kamal	Perumazhakkalam
2005	Blessy	Thanmatra
2006	Major Ravi	Keerthichakra
2007	Lal Jose	Arabikatha
2008	Akku Akbar	Veruthe Oru Bharya
2009	Ranjith	Paleri Manikyam : Oru Pathira Kolapathakathinte Katha
2010	Lal	In Ghost House Inn
2011	Ranjith	Indian Rupee
2012	Ranjith	Spirit
2013	Lijo Jose Pellissery	Amen
2014	Anjali Menon	Bangalore Days
2015	Alphonse Putharen	Premam
2016	Vysakh	Pulimurugan
2017	Mahesh Narayan	Take off
2018	Lijo Jose Pellissery	Ee.Ma.Yau
2019	Prithviraj Sukumaran	Lucifer

=== Best Script Writer ===
The Asianet Film Award for Best Script Writer has been awarded since 1998.

Year	Winner	Film(s)
1998	Unknown recipient	
1999	Lohithadas	Veendum Chila Veettukaryangal
2000	Unknown recipient	
2001	T. A. Razak	Uthaman
2002	T. K. Rajiv Kumar	Sesham
2003	Ranjith	Mizhi Randilum
2004	T. A. Razak	Perumazhakkalam
2005	Sreenivasan	Udayananu Tharam
2006	James Albert	Classmates
2007	Babu Thiruvalla	Thaniye
2007	Nedumudi Venu	Thaniye
2008	Gireesh Kumar	Veruthe Oru Bharya
2009	Ranjith Shankar	Passenger
2010	Sathyan Anthikkad	Kadha Thudarunnu
2011	Bobby Sanjay	Traffic
2012	Anjali Menon	Ustad Hotel
2014	Gopan Chidambaram	Iyobinte Pusthakam
2015	R. S. Vimal	Ennu Ninte Moideen
2016	Udayakrishna	Pulimurugan
2017	Sajeev Pazhoor	Thondimuthalum Driksakshiyum
2018	Sreenivasan	Njan Prakashan

=== Best Cinematographer ===
The Asianet Film Award for Best Cinematographer has been awarded since 1998.

Year	Winner	Film(s)
1998	Unknown recipient	
1999	Vipin Mohan	Veendum Chila Veettukaryangal
2000	Unknown recipient	
2001	Venugopal	Meghamalhar
2002	Venugopal	Nammal
2003	S. Kumar	Pattalam
2004	Unknown recipient	
2005	S. Kumar	Udayananu Tharam
2006	Santosh Thundiyil	Palunku
2007	Manoj Pillai	Rock & Roll, Arabikatha
2008	Santosh Thundiyil	Aakasha Gopuram
2009	Ajayan Vincent	Bhramaram
2010	Venu	Kadha Thudarunnu, Pranchiyettan and the Saint
2011	Madhu Ambat	Adaminte Makan Abu
2012	Jomon T. John	Thattathin Marayathu
2014	Amal Neerad	Iyobinte Pusthakam
2015	Jomon T. John	Ennu Ninte Moideen, Charlie
2016	Shaji Kumar	Pulimurugan

=== Best Editing ===
The Asianet Film Award for Best Editing has been awarded since 1998.

Year	Winner	Film(s)
1998	Unknown recipient	
1999	Sreekar Prasad	Olympiyan Anthony Adam
2000	K. Sankunni	Pathram
2001	Beena Paul	Meghamalhar
2002	Unknown recipient	
2003	Ranjan Abraham	C. I. D. Moosa
2004	Unknown recipient	
2005	Ranjan Abraham	Various
2006	Ranjan Abraham	Classmates
2007	Narayanan	Thaniye
2008	Ranjan Abraham	Veruthe Oru Bharya
2009	Vijay Shanker	Bhramaram
2010	Arun Kumar	Cocktail
2012	Arun Kumar	Ee Adutha Kalathu
2014	Beena Paul	Munnariyippu
2015	Mahesh Narayan	Ennu Ninte Moideen
2016	M.S. Ayyappan Nair	Oppam
2016	Johnkutty	Pulimurugan
2017	Kiran Das	Thondimuthalum Driksakshiyum
2018	Vivek Harshan	Varathan

== Awards for music ==
=== Best Music Director ===
The Asianet Film Award for Best Music Director has been awarded since 1998.

Year	Winner	Film(s)
1998	Unknown recipient	
1999	Mohan Sithara	Deepasthambham Mahascharyam, Vasantiyum Lakshmiyum Pinne Njanum
2000	Unknown recipient	
2001	M. G. Radhakrishnan	Kattu Vannu Vilichappol
2002	Kaithapram Vishwanathan Nambudiri	Kannaki
2003	M. Jayachandran	Gaurisankaram
2004	M. Jayachandran	Perumazhakkalam, Mampazhakkalam
2005	M. G. Radhakrishnan	Anandabhadram
2006	Raveendran	Vadakkumnadhan
2007	M. Jayachandran	Nivedyam
2008	Vidyasagar	Mulla
2009	Deepak Dev	Puthiya Mukham
2010	M. G. Sreekumar	Oru Naal Varum
2011	M. Jayachandran	Pranayam, Rathinirvedam
2012	Gopi Sundar	Ustad Hotel
2013	Prashant Pillai	Amen
2014	Gopi Sundar	Various films
2015	Rajesh Murugesan	Premam
2016	4 Musics	Oppam
2017	Bijibal	Thondimuthalum Driksakshiyum
2018	M. Jayachandran	Koode, Odiyan
2019	Vishnu Vijay	Ambili

=== Best Lyricist ===
The Asianet Film Award for Best Lyricist has been awarded since 1998.

Year	Winner	Film(s)
1998	Unknown recipient	
1999	Yusuf Ali Kechery	Deepasthambham Mahascharyam
2000	Unknown recipient	
2001	O. N. V. Kurup	Meghamalhar
2002	O. N. V. Kurup	Ente Hridhayathinte Utama
2003	Vayalar Sarath Chandra Varma	Mizhi Randilum
2004	Gireesh Puthenchery	Mampazhakkalam
2005	Kaithapram Namboothiri	Anandabhadram
2006	Gireesh Puthenchery	Vadakkumnadhan
2007	Anil Panachooran	Kadha Parayumbol, Arabikatha
2008	Gireesh Puthenchery	Madambi
2009	Vayalar Sarath Chandra Varma	Neelathaamara
2010	Murukan Kattakada	Oru Naal Varum
2011	O. N. V. Kurup	Pranayam
2012	Rafeeq Ahmed	Ustad Hotel
2014	Rafeeq Ahmed	How Old Are You
2015	Rafeeq Ahmed	Ennu Ninte Moideen
2016	B.K.Harinarayanan	Oppam
2017	Rafeeq Ahmed	Thondimuthalum Driksakshiyum, Munthirivallikal Thalirkkumbol
2018	B.K.Harinarayanan	Theevandi, Aravindante Athidhikal, Ira
2019	Vinayak Sasikumar	Ambili

=== Best Playback Singer (Male) ===
The Asianet Film Award for Best Male Playback Singer has been awarded since 1998.

Year	Winner	Film(s)
1998	Unknown recipient	
1999	Jayachandran	Niram
2000	K. J. Yesudas	Various
2001	Jayachandran	Raavanaprabhu
2002	Vidhu Prathap	Nammal
2003	M.G. Sreekumar	Manassinakkare
2004	M. Jayachandran	Perumazhakkalam
2005	M. G. Sreekumar	Thanmathra, Anandabhadram
2006	G. Venugopal	Baba Kalyani
2007	Madhu Balakrishnan	Rock n' Roll
2008	M. G. Sreekumar	Innathe Chintha Vishayam
2009	Shankar Mahadevan	Puthiya Mukham
2010	Hariharan	Kadha Thudarunnu
2011	Hariharan	Snehaveedu
2012	Vijay Yesudas	Spirit
2013	Vijay Yesudas	Memories
2014	Haricharan	Bangalore Days
2015	Vijay Yesudas	Premam
2016	Not awarded	
2017	Shahabaz Aman	Mayaanadhi
2018	Vijay Yesudas	Joseph
2019	Vijay Yesudas	Uyare

=== Best Playback Singer (Female) ===
The Asianet Film Award for Best Female Playback Singer has been awarded since 1998.

Year	Winner	Film(s)
1998	Sujatha Mohan	Pranayavarnangal
1999	K. S. Chithra	Megham
2000	K. S. Chithra	Mazha
2001	Sujatha Mohan	Soothradharan
2002	Jyotsna	Nammal
2003	K. S. Chithra	Mizhi Randilum
2004	Sujatha Mohan	Mampazhakkalam
2005	K. S. Chithra	Achuvinte Amma
2006	Manjari	Rasathanthram
2007	K. S. Chithra	Hallo
2008	Shweta Mohan	Novel
2009	K. S. Chithra	Pazhassiraja
2010	Shreya Ghoshal	Aagathan
2011	Shreya Ghoshal	Rathinirvedam
2012	K. S. Chithra	Thalsamayam Oru Penkutty
2013	Mridula Warrier	Kalimannu
2014	Shweta Mohan	Ottamandaram
2015	Vaikom Vijayalakshmi	Oru Vadakkan Selfie
2016	Not awarded	
2017	Shweta Mohan	Munthirivallikal Thalirkkumbol
2018	Shreya Ghoshal	Odiyan
2019	Bombay Jayashri	Mamangam

== Special awards ==
=== Lifetime Achievement Award ===
The Asianet Film Award for Lifetime Achievement has been awarded since 1998.

Year	Winner	Profession
1998	Aranmula Ponnamma	Actress
1999	P. Bhaskaran	Lyricist, director
2000	K. Raghavan	Music director
2001	Thilakan	Actor
2002	Madhu	Actor
2003	M. T. Vasudevan Nair	Scriptwriter
2004	Jagathy Sreekumar	Actor
2005	Sukumari	Actress
2006	Shobana Parameswaran Nair	Producer
2007	Sreenivasan	Actor
2008	K. J. Yesudas	Singer
2009	P. V. Gangadharan	Producer
2010	Amitabh Bachchan	Actor
2011	Shah Rukh Khan	Actor
2012	Not awarded	
2013	Innocent	Actor
2015	K. J. Yesudas	Singer
2016	M. T. Vasudevan Nair	Screenplay writer
2017	Nedumudi Venu	Actor
2018	Sreekumaran Thampi	Director, lyricist, screenwriter
2019	P. Susheela	Singer

=== Honour Special Jury Award ===
The Asianet Film Honour Special Jury Award has been awarded since 2005.

Year	Winner(s)	Work
2019	Soubin Shahir	Actor (Kumbalangi Nights)
2019	K. S. Harisankar	Singer (Athiran)
2018	Urvashi	Actress (Ente Ummante Peru, Aravindante Athidhikal)
2018	Joju George	Actor (Joseph)
2017	Joju George	Actor (Udaharanam Sujatha)
2017	Soubin Shahir	Director (Parava)
2016	Peter Hein	Action master (Pulimurugan)
2016	Sijoy Varghese	Actor (James & Alice)
2015	Vikram and Sai Pallavi	Actor and actress (various movies, Premam)
2015	Vijayaraghavan	Actor (various films)
2013	Dileep	Actor (various films)
2012	Manoj K. Jayan	Actor (various films)
2012	Kunchako Boban	Actor (various films)
2012	Anoop Menon	Actor (various films)
2011	Jaya Prada	Actress (Pranayam)
2010	Karthi	Actor (various films)
2010	Sreenivasan	Actor (Athma Kadha)
2009	Kamal Haasan	Actor, director (various films)
2009	Resul Pookutty	Sound designer
2009	R. Sarathkumar	Actor (various films)
2009	Vivek	Actor (various films)
2009	Suman	Actor (various films)
2008	Vimala Raman	Actress (various films)
2008	Major Ravi	Director
2008	Priyadarsan	Director
2007	Jackie Shroff	Actor (various films)
2007	Rosshan Andrrews	Director
2007	Lakshmi Sharma	Actress (various films)
2004	Dileep	Actor (Kathavasheshan)
2004	Kavya Madhavan	Actress (Perumazhakkalam)

=== Critics Award ===
This special award has been given by Asianet since 2009.

Year	Winner(s)	Award
2019	Thanneer Mathan Dinangal	Best Film
2019	Suraj Venjaramoodu	Best Actor
2018	Not awarded	
2017	Kunchacko Boban	Best Actor
2016	Maheshinte Prathikaaram	Best Film
2016	Dulquer Salmaan	Best Actor

=== Other special awards ===
These special awards have been given by Asianet since 2009.

Year	Winner(s)	Award
2019	Nivin Pauly	Golden Star of the Year
2019	Asif Ali	Performer of the Year
2018	Mukesh	Evergreen Entertainer
2018	Tovino Thomas	Performer of the Year
2018	Jayaram	Golden Star of the Year
2017	Tovino Thomas	Performer of the Year
2017	Dulquer Salmaan	Golden Star of the Year
2016	Mukesh	Multifaceted Personality of the Year
2015	Mammootty	Millennium Actor Award
2014	Mohanlal	Special Commemoration - For 35 Years in Malayalam Film Industry
2014	Jayaram	Asianet Golden Star of the Year
2014	Dulquer Salmaan	Star of the Year
2014	Fahad Fasil	Performer of the Year
2013	Shah Rukh Khan	International Icon of Indian Cinema
2013	Mohanlal	Millennium Actor Award
2012	Mammootty	Guest of Honour Award
2012	Kamal Haasan	Guest of Honour Award
2012	Prakash Raj	Asianet Golden Star Award
2012	Jacqueline Fernandez	Most Stylish Bollywood Actress
2012	Jayaram	Special Commemoration - 25 Years in the Industry
2011	Asin Thottumkal	Pride of Kerala in Bollywood
2011	Vidya Balan	Most Popular in Hindi
2011	R. Madhavan	Asianet Golden Star Award
2011	Mammootty	Cultural Icon of Kerala
2010	Mohanlal	Asianet Golden Star Award
2009	Mammootty	Asianet Millennium Star Award

=== Popular Actor / Actress, Tamil ===
Year	Winner(s)	Award
2010	Vijay	Most Popular Tamil Actor
2011	Dhanush	Most Popular Tamil Actor
2012	Not awarded	
2013	Kamal Haasan	Best Tamil Actor
2014	Not awarded	
2015	Vikram	Most Popular Tamil Actor
2015	Trisha	Most Popular Tamil Actress
2016	Tamannaah Bhatia	Most Popular Tamil Actress
2017	Keerthy Suresh	Most Popular Tamil Actress
2018	Trisha	Most Popular Tamil Actress
2019	Manju Warrier	Most Popular Tamil Actress
2019	Karthi	Most Popular Tamil Actor

== Former awards ==
=== Most Popular Duet ===
The Asianet Film Award for Most Popular Duet was only awarded in 2016.

Year	Winner	Film(s)
2016	Unni Menon	Jacobinte Swargarajyam
2016	Sitaara	Jacobinte Swargarajyam

=== Most Popular Singer ===
The Asianet Film Award for Most Popular Singer was only awarded in 2012.

Year	Winner	Film(s)
2012	Remya Nambeesan	Thattathin Marayathu

=== Best Feature Film on National Integration ===
The Asianet Film Award for Best Feature Film on National Integration was awarded in 2006 and 2010.

Year	Film(s)	Director
2006	Kirtichakra	Major Ravi
2010	Kandahar	Major Ravi
2011	Urumi	Santosh Sivan
2012	Spirit	Ranjith

=== Best Sound Recordist ===
The Asianet Film Award for Best Sound Recordist was awarded in 2001, 2002, 2005 and 2006.

Year	Winner	Film(s)
2001	Krishnan Unni	Kattu Vannu Vilichappol
2002	Harikumar	Kannaki
2005	Shaji Madhavan	Naran
2006	Vinod	Karutha Pakshikal
2006	Anoop	Karutha Pakshikal
2006	Ajith	Karutha Pakshikal

=== Best Makeup Artist ===
The Asianet Film Award for Best Makeup Artist was awarded in 2001 to 2003.

Year	Winner	Film(s)
2001	Salim	Raavanaprabhu
2001	P V Shankar	Raavanaprabhu
2002	Pattanam Rasheed	Kunjikoonan
2003	Pandyan	Manassinakkare

== Most frequent award winners ==
Most frequent winners
Artist	Wins	Nominations
Mohanlal	16	—
Biju Menon; Mammootty	9	—
K S Chithra	7	9
Suraj Venjaramoodu; Kavya Madhavan; Jayaram; Sreenivasan; Prithviraj Sukumaran; Innocent	7	—
M. Jayachandran; Manju Warrier; Nivin Pauly	6	—
Dileep; Dulquer Salmaan	5	—

Most awards for a single film
Film	Year	Wins	Nominations
Ennu Ninte Moideen	2015	9	11
Thanmatra	2005	8	12
Katha Thudarunnu	2010	8	8

== See also ==
- Mazhavil Entertainment Awards
