= 13th Asianet Film Awards =

Indian film award ceremony in 2011

- Awarded for: Best of cinema in 2010
- Date: 9 January 2011
- Location: Kochi
- Country: India
- Presented by: Asianet

The 13th Asianet Film Awards honors the best films in 2010 and was held on 9 January 2011 at Willingdon Island in Kochi. The winners were announced on 1 January 2011. The title sponsor of the event was Ujala.

Amitabh Bachchan, who was conferred the Lifetime Achievement Award, was the chief. The event was telecast on Asianet in two parts – on 29 January and 30 January.

== Winners ==
- Best Film: Pranchiyettan and the Saint
- Best Director: Lal for In Ghost House Inn
- Lifetime Achievement Award: Amitabh Bachchan
- Golden Star Award: Mohanlal
- Best Actor: Mammootty for Pranchiyettan and the Saint, Kutty Srank, Best Actor
- Best Actress: Nayantara for Body Guard
- Most Popular Actor: Dileep for Body Guard
- Most Popular Actress: Mamta Mohandas for Kadha Thudarunnu
- Best Character Actor: Innocent for Kadha Thudarunnu
- Best Character Actress: Samvrutha Sunil for Cocktail
- Special Jury Award: Sreenivasan for Athma Kadha
- Best Music Director: M. G. Sreekumar for Oru Naal Varum
- Best Screenplay: Sathyan Anthikkad for Kadha Thudarunnu
- Best Cinematographer: Venu for Kadha Thudarunnu
- Best Editor: Arun Kumar for Cocktail
- Best Music Director: M. G. Sreekumar for Oru Naal Varum
- Best Lyricist: Murukan Kattakada for Oru Naal Varum
- Best Supporting Actor: Nedumudi Venu for Elsamma Enna Ankutty, Best Actor
- Best Supporting Actress: Lakshmipriya for Kadha Thudarunnu
- Best Actor in a Villain Role: Asif Ali for Apoorvaragam
- Best Actor in a Comic Role: Suraj Venjaramoodu for Various films
- Best Star Pair: Kunchacko Boban & Archana Jose Kavi for Mummy & Me
- Best Debutant Actress: Ann Augustine for Elsamma Enna Aankutty
- Best Child Artist (Male): Master Alexander for T D Dasan Std VI B
- Best Child Artist (Female): Baby Anikha for Kadha Thudarunnu
- Best Male Playback Singer: Hariharan for "Aaro Padunnu" (Kadha Thudarunnu)
- Best Female Playback Singer: Shreya Ghoshal for "Manjumazhakkalam" (Aagathan)
- Youth Icon of the Year: Jayasurya for Happy Husbands, Cocktail, Nallavan, Four Friends
- Popular Hero Award in Tamil Films: Vijay
- Special Award for Best Film on National Integration: Major Ravi for Kandahar
