= Gopi Sundar =

Indian musician (born 1977)

- Born: 30 May 1977 (age 49); Kochi, Kerala, India
- Genres: Film score, World music, Electronic
- Occupations: Film composer; Music Director; Record Producer; Instrumentalist; Singer; Songwriter
- Years active: 2003–present
- Labels: Muzik247; Avenir Music; Aditya Music; T-Series
- Website: www.gopisundarmusic.com

Gopi Sundar C. S. (born 30 May 1977) is an Indian music director, programmer, playback singer, songwriter, actor and performer who works in the Malayalam, Telugu and Tamil film industries.

He began his career composing music for television commercials and is credited with writing nearly 5,000 jingles. As a keyboardist, he has collaborated with many music directors, including the composer duo Vishal–Shekhar. He has won several accolades for his soundtracks and film scores, including a National Film Award, a Kerala State Film Award, and two Filmfare Awards South.

In 2014, Sundar started his own recording label, Gopi Sundar Music Company with an idea to promote aspiring musicians and to make low-budget productions possible. In 2016, he formed a live performance music band called "Band Big G" in Dubai. In 2017, his work in the film Pulimurugan was included in the contender list for the 90th Academy Awards nominations for Best Original Song and Best Original Score categories.

== Early life ==
Gopi Sundar C.S. was born on 30 May 1977 In Kochi, Kerala. He spent a large part of his childhood in Kochi with his parents Suresh Babu and Livi. His early interest in music started from working in his father's recording studio business and listening to the radio with his mother. During school days, Sundar was keener on playing the tabla and keyboard than studying. Eventually, when he dropped out of school after failing his SSLC exams, his parents were supportive enough to let him pursue his dreams. Keen to make a career in music, he left for Chennai, where he took up classes at the Government Music College, but discontinued the course, feeling disillusioned.

== Career ==
=== Early years ===
His father, Suresh, helped him get into the music troupe of Malayalam composer Ouseppachan. Ouseppachan, a longtime friend of Sundar's father, took him as an assistant and became a mentor to Sundar. While on the team, Sundar worked his way up, playing tabla and keyboard, and was soon noticed for his composing skills as well. In an association that spanned more than a decade, Sundar assisted Ouseppachan with several works.

In the years that Sundar spent in Chennai, he struggled to find a foothold in the music industry. His first exposure to professional music came in the form of composing jingles for TV commercials. In those difficult days, his uncle Devan, an actor-politician in Malayalam films, helped him get a roof over his head. Sudheer Kariat, son of the legendary Malayalam filmmaker Ramu Kariat, showed him the ropes of how to stand out in the fast lane of advertising. In the world of the catchy jingle music of advertising, it took him seven years to create a niche for himself. His ever-growing repertoire consists of almost 5,000 jingles, a number of them advertising the work of filmmaker and feature film cinematographer Rajiv Menon. He has also done keyboard programming for the Bollywood music director duo Vishal–Shekhar, including for popular songs like "Ek Main Aur Ek Tu Hai" (Bluffmaster!), "Aankhon mein teri" (Om Shanti Om), and music for Taxi No. 9211.

=== 2005–2012 ===
Sundar got his first break as a film score composer with Notebook after the director Rosshan Andrrews happened to notice his programming for the film Udayananu Tharam. The eventual success of the film catapulted him into the mainstream, with Sibi Malayil offering him the first contract for soundtrack composition for the Malayalam film Flash, starring Mohanlal. The turning point in his career was the film Big B, which was the debut feature of not only the director Amal Neerad but also a host of technicians including Sameer Thahir, Vivek Harshan, and Unni R. Although the film, which starred Mammooty, opened to mixed reviews, it was lauded for its technical finesse and for providing a film experience that was altogether new to the Malayalam cinema. Sundar's background score, which blended aptly with the tone of the film, escalated his popularity amongst the Malayali film audiences. Big B marked the beginning of Sundar's long-term association with Amal Neerad.

In 2008, Sundar made his Tamil film industry debut by composing the background score for the film Poi Solla Porom. He then went on to compose songs for several films, notably the film Sagar Alias Jackie Reloaded (2009) starring Mohanlal, which had him compose both the soundtrack and film score. Despite the film being panned by critics and audiences alike, the songs were an instant hit. The first major award came his way for the film Anwar in 2010, for which he received the Filmfare Award for Best Music Director.

Casanovva (2012), a Malayalam romantic-thriller film, saw him reunite with Rosshan Andrrews. He shared music credits with Alphons Joseph and Gowri Lakshmi for the soundtrack. Although the audio rights were acquired by Satyam Audios at a record price of ₹12 million (US$190,000), the film had a disappointing run at the box office. His next major work that year was for Anwar Rasheed's film Ustad Hotel. The film won wide critical acclaim and was a commercial success. The film's five-song soundtrack went on to become one of his most popular soundtrack albums and received rave reviews from critics, audiences, and his contemporaries alike. "Appangalembadum", a quirky reworking of a popular but traditional Mappilappattu song crooned by Anna Katharina Valayil, was an instant hit following its radio release and eventually became one of the biggest hits of the year. It got him the year's Filmfare Award, Asianet Film Awards, SIIMA, and Kochi Times Awards for Best Music Direction, and a Pearl Award for Best Background Score. Music director Bijibal, picked the film score of Ustad Hotel as his favourite when asked to pick "the best contemporary background score of his choice".

=== 2013–2015 ===
In 2013, he sang a melody called "Titli", tuned by Vishal–Shekhar along with Chinmayi and Srimathumitha, for the Bollywood film Chennai Express. The Rohit Shetty film, which also starred Shah Rukh Khan and Deepika Padukone, turned out to be one of the highest-grossing Indian films of all time. Sundar's subsequent films found commercial success, including the Dulquer Salmaan vehicle ABCD: American Born Confused Desi, Left Right Left, 5 Sundarikal, Vishuddhan, and Salalah Mobiles. With Salalah Mobiles, he made his acting debut, with a cameo appearance as a qawwali singer in the song "Rasoolallah". His fame increased with the release of his 2014 film titled 1983, a coming-of-age sports drama film, marking the debut of screenwriter-director Abrid Shine. The film, a tribute to cricketer Sachin Tendulkar, was the first successful film of 2014. The soundtrack of the film was also a success, and the track "Olanjali Kuruvi", sung by P.Jayachandran and Vani Jayaram, was a "chartbuster". "For maintaining the tempo of the film with an in-sync background score", Sundar received the National Film Award for Best Background Score from the president of India, Pranab Mukherjee, at Vigyan Bhavan, New Delhi.

Amongst a string of films he tuned, the classical fusion single "Sadaa Paalaya" sung by Sithara for the film Mr.Fraud, aced the charts. He also made a cameo appearance in the film, alongside Mohanlal. The film How Old Are You?, which marked the comeback of Malayalam film actress Manju Warrier after a 14-year sabbatical, was his next major project. The film went on to become a success, and the soundtrack was equally appreciated by the audience. "Vijanathayil", a lilting melody from the film sung by Shreya Ghoshal, was a huge hit that won her the Best Female Playback Singer Award at the 62nd Annual Filmfare Awards.

Bangalore Days, a romantic comedy-drama film directed by Anjali Menon, featuring an ensemble cast of the top Malayalam actors, was his next release. The five-song soundtrack was a success and has turned out to contain his most-liked tracks.

In September, Sundar did his first live concert at Swapnanagari, Kozhikode. The musical event, organised by the Film Employees Federation of Kerala, the Music Directors Union, and the D Cutz Film Company, was the first of a series of concerts that saw eight composers coming together for the first time to raise funds for the Cochin Haneefa Foundation, which helps struggling film artists. The concert series, titled Jamgraab, was made up of the first letters of the names of the eight music directors involved: Jassie Gift, Alphons Joseph, Mejo Joseph, Gopi Sundar, Rahul Raj, Anil Johnson, Afzal Yusuf, and Bijibal. Following a tremendous response from the music fans, they held a second gig in February 2015 at Sharjah Cricket Stadium, which was to be followed by a world tour across the cities in the US, UK and Australia in coming years.

Sundar forayed into the Telugu film industry with the film Malli Malli Idi Rani Roju, which fetched him many fans in Telangana and Andhra Pradesh. He further expanded his reach with his second Telugu film, Bhale Bhale Magadivoy, which was a success at the box office; the soundtrack amassed equally good reviews. Deepu Joseph of The Times of India gave the soundtrack album 3.5 out of 5 stars and called it an album that "has something in it for everyone and it sure to be a hit".

Ennu Ninte Moideen, where he collaborated with M. Jayachandran and Ramesh Narayan in music direction, was his next. He did the background score and composed the song "Mukkathe Penne", a poignant melody that served as a paean to the timeless love of Moideen and Kanchanamala, portrayed in the film by actors Prithviraj Sukumaran and Parvathy, respectively. The lyrics to the minute song were penned by Mohammed Maqbool Mansoor, one of Sundar's main backing vocalists. The song was written and composed in less than five minutes, and they sang it themselves. . The film was a success at the box office and was equally appreciated by the critics for adapting a real-life story "without compromising on the aesthetics of the medium". For "creating a haunting melodic composition", his collaborator, M. Jayachandran, received a National Film Award for Best Music Direction. His compositions for the film Charlie also went on to become a hit, and the single "Chundari Penne", crooned by Dulquer Salmaan, received wide recognition. He won two Best Music Director Awards for the film: one North American Film Award and one IIFA Award.

=== 2016–present ===
In 2016, Sundar composed the film score and seven-song soundtrack of the Telugu film Oopiri, which was simultaneously released in Tamil as Thozha. The film, which starred Karthi in the lead role, was a commercial success, grossing over ₹1 billion (US$14.5 million) worldwide. The Times of India gave Oopiri's soundtrack four stars, calling it a "winner on all counts and Gopi Sundar is increasingly becoming a force to be reckoned with in Tollywood". Sundar composed the soundtrack and film score for the film Pulimurugan, which is currently the highest-grossing film in the Malayalam film industry. The Times of India's critic Sanjith Surendran praised Sundar's "rousing theme music that made the 161-minute runtime a breeze". The two songs ("Kaadanayum Kaalchilambe" and "Maanathe Maarikurumbe") and the film score of Pulimurugan were selected by the Academy of Motion Picture Arts and Sciences to contend in the 90th Academy Awards nominations for Best Original Song and Best Original Score categories. Including Pulimurugan, a total of 70 original songs and 141 original scores were selected in that year. He won a Best Music Director award for the film from the Asiavision Awards, while K.S Chitra won the Best Female Singer Award for the song "Kaadaniyum Kalchilambe", along with a South Indian International Movie Award for Best Playback Singer Female. Vani Jairam won the Best Female Singer award for the song "Manathe Marikurumbe" from the same film.

Sundar composed the background score for the Tamil musical comedy horror film Devi, which was simultaneously shot and released in Telugu and Hindi as Abhinetri and Tutak Tutak Tutiya, respectively. For Premam, the Telugu remake of the Malayalam film of the same name he collaborated with Rajesh Murugesan, the music director of the original Malayalam film. The film received positive reviews upon release in Telangana. Behindwoods lauded the soundtrack album for "staying true to the original, yet exploring better nuances of music". Sundar composed the only two songs for the Mammootty vehicle The Great Father (2017). Comrade in America, a Malayalam romantic comedy film, saw him reunite with his long-time collaborator, Amal Neerad. The three-song soundtrack, of which two songs were sung by the actor Dulquar Salmaan, was released under Sundar's record label, Gopi Sundar Music Company. The single "Adiga Adiga" from the Telugu film Ninnu Kori, which was released in July was a hit. Having finished working on Role Models, Tiyaan, Chunkzz, and Udaharanam Sujatha, which garnered good response.

== Frequent collaborators ==
Sundar has been the most frequent collaborator for films directed by Rosshan Andrrews. He has also frequently associated with Amal Neerad, Arun Kumar Aravind, Vysakh, along with screenwriter duo Bobby–Sanjay, Udayakrishna-Siby K. Thomas and Murali Gopy. Most of the lyrics for the songs composed by him are penned by Rafeeq Ahamed. However, he has also collaborated extensively with lyricists Santhosh Varma and B.K Harinarayanan.

== Other ventures ==
=== Music band ===
Gopi Sundar launched "Band Big G", his music band, in 2016 in front of a capacity crowd at Al Nasr Leisureland, Dubai. The band is a live performance music band with a revolving quota of vocalists and instrumentalists, with Sundar as the only permanent member. The types of songs are decided depending on the audience and the event. The first gig consisted of an ensemble of Malayalam singers Afsal, Sithara, Najim Arshad, Haricharan, Divya S. Menon, Ramsi, Kavya Ajit, and Sruthi Lakshmi{phanivardhan}. They played a fusion compilation of Sundar's compositions along with old Malayalam classics.

=== Recording studio ===
Sunsa Digital Workstation is Sundar's music recording studio. It is a state-of-the-art studio primarily located in Chennai, which is used by Sundar for recording his compositions. Sundar opened his second studio in Kochi. The recording studio was featured in Discovery Channel's TV Show India My Way in 2017. As a part of the all-India tour for their programme, the hosts – model-turned-actor Paloma Monappa and Meeraj – visited the place while the song recording for the film Comrade in America was in progress. The show also features Amal Neerad, Dulquer Salmaan, and Sundar himself giving insights into the new wave of Malayalam cinema.

=== Music label ===
Gopi Sundar launched his own record label, Gopi Sundar Music Company, in 2014. The label aims to support aspiring filmmakers and promising low-budget films by producing the music while retaining the copyrights of the work. It also looks to provide creative and talented artists with a platform for independent music creation and licensing. The soundtrack album for the Malayalam film Last Supper was the first to be released under the aegis of the label, followed by several films, with Comrade in America being the latest.

== Personal life ==
Gopi Sundar married Priya in 2001 and the couple have two children: Madhav (2002) and Yadhav (2004). Priya and Sundar got separated and their divorce case is still in court. Sundar entered in a live-in relationship with singer Abhaya Hiranmayi, and in July 2018, he revealed that they had been together for 9 years. He was also reported to have dated Idea Star Singer contestant Amrutha Suresh, with claims suggesting that the couple was in a live-in relationship. However, both of them have denied these reports.

== Filmography ==
=== Films ===
Year	Film	Role	Language	Notes
2014	Mr. Fraud	Himself	Malayalam	Cameo in the song "Khuda"
2014	Salala Mobiles	Qawwali Singer	Malayalam	Cameo in the song "Rasaoolallah"sal
2015	Mili	Himself	Malayalam	Special appearance in the song "Manpaatha"

=== Television ===
Year	Show	Role	Language	Network	Notes
2015	Bol Baby Bol Malayalam	Judge	Malayalam	Surya TV	Reality singing show
2015	Music India Malayalam	Judge	Malayalam	Asianet	Reality singing show
2016	Shajahanum Pareekuttiyum	Himself	Malayalam		
2019–2020	Sa Re Ga Ma Pa Keralam''	Judge	Malayalam	Zee Keralam	Reality singing show
2020	Kaiyethum Doorathu	Music director	Malayalam		Title song
2020	Naga Bhairavi	Music director	Telugu	Zee Telugu	Title song
2020	Karthika Deepam	Music director	Malayalam	Zee Keralam	Title song
2021–Present	Sing N Win season 2	Judge	Malayalam	Flowers USA	Online reality singing show
2021–Present	Sa Re Ga Ma Pa Lil champs	Judge	Malayalam	Zee Keralam	Reality siniging show

== Awards and nominations ==
Year	Award	Category	Film(s)	Result	Ref.
2011	Mirchi Music Awards South	Listeners choice album of the year	Anwar	Won	
2011	Mirchi Music Awards South	Listeners choice Song of the year	Anwar	Won	
2011	Mirchi Music Awards South	Special award Technical sound engineer	Anwar	Won	
2011	58th Filmfare Awards South	Best Music Director – Malayalam	Anwar	Won	
2013	15th Asianet Film Awards	Best Music Director	Ustad Hotel	Won	
2013	60th Filmfare Awards South	Best Music Director – Malayalam	Ustad Hotel	Nominated	
2013	2nd South Indian International Movie Awards	Best Music Director – Malayalam	Ustad Hotel	Nominated	
2013	Pearl Awards	Best Background Score	Ustad Hotel	Won	
2013	Kochi Times Film Awards	Best Music Director	Ustad Hotel	Won	
2014	Asiavision Awards	Best Music Director	1983, Banglore Days	Won	
2015	17th Asianet Film Awards	Best Music Director	1983, Banglore Days	Won	
2015	Vanitha Film Awards	Popular Song of the Year	Banglore Days	Won	
2015	62nd National Film Awards	Best Music Direction (Background Score)	1983	Won	
2015	62nd Filmfare Awards South	Best Music Director – Malayalam	Bangalore Days	Won	
2015	4th South Indian International Movie Awards	Best Music Director – Malayalam	Bangalore Days	Won	
2016	Asiavision Awards	Best Music Director	Charlie, Kali, Pulimurugan	Won	
2016	1st IIFA Utsavam	Best Music Director – Malayalam	Ennu Ninte Moideen	Nominated	
2016	5th South Indian International Movie Awards	Best Music Director – Telugu	Bhale Bhale Magadivoy	Nominated	
2016	North American Film Awards	Best Music Director	Charlie, Ennu Ninte Moideen	Won	
2016	Mirchi Music Awards South	Listeners Choice Album of the Year	Charlie	Won	
2016	Mirchi Music Awards South	Album of the Year	Charlie	Won	
2016	63rd Filmfare Awards South	Best Music Director – Malayalam	Charlie	Nominated	
2016	63rd Filmfare Awards South	Best Music Director – Telugu	Malli Malli Idi Rani Roju	Nominated	
2017	Asiavision Awards	Best Music Director	Take Off, The Great Father	Won	
2017	2nd IIFA Utsavam	Best Music Director – Malayalam	Charlie	Won	
2017	64th Filmfare Awards South	Best Music Director – Malayalam	Kali	Nominated	
2017	6th South Indian International Movie Awards	Best Music Director – Malayalam	Pulimurugan	Nominated	
2018	90th Academy Awards	Best Original Song	Pulimurugan	Shortlisted	
2018	90th Academy Awards	Best Original Score	Pulimurugan	Shortlisted	
2018	48th Kerala State Film Awards	Best Background Music	Take Off	Won	
2019	66th Filmfare Awards South	Best Music Director – Telugu	Geetha Govindam	Nominated	
2019	8th South Indian International Movie Awards	Best Music Director – Telugu	Geetha Govindam	Nominated	
2019	Zee Cine Awards Telugu	Favorite Album of the Year	Geetha Govindam	Won	
2021	9th South Indian International Movie Awards				
2021	9th South Indian International Movie Awards	Best Music Director – Telugu	Majili	Nominated	
2022	10th South Indian International Movie Awards	Best Music Director – Telugu	Most Eligible Bachelor	Nominated	
