= Pranayam (2011 film) =

- Life is more beautiful than a dream
- Directed by: Blessy
- Written by: Blessy
- Produced by: P. K. Sajeev; Anne Sajeev
- Starring: Mohanlal; Jaya Prada; Anupam Kher
- Cinematography: Satheesh Kurup
- Edited by: Raja Muhammed
- Music by: M. Jayachandran
- Production company: Fragrant Nature Film Creations
- Distributed by: Maxlab Entertainments (Tamilnadu); Mohit Productions & Studio99 Films (outside Kerala)
- Release date: 31 August 2011
- Running time: 139 minutes
- Country: India
- Language: Malayalam

Pranayam (transl. Love) is a 2011 Indian Malayalam-language romantic drama film written and directed by Blessy. The film stars Mohanlal, Jaya Prada, and Anupam Kher. The plot revolves around the love bond between the characters of Mathews (Mohanlal), Grace (Jaya Prada), and Achutha Menon (Kher). The music for the film was composed by M. Jayachandran. The film opened to positive reviews from critics and was also average at the box office.

== Plot ==
The film begins with Achutha Menon, a man in his late sixties, arriving in the city to stay with his daughter-in-law and granddaughter after suffering a heart attack. He was a football player who had been selected to be on the State team but could never play for the team. He moulded his life and career to accommodate the romance in his life.

One day, Menon sees his former wife, Grace, in the elevator and collapses. Grace, who is staying in the same building with her husband, daughter, and son-in-law, arranges for him to be taken to the hospital and even pays the deposit for the emergency treatment. Slowly their relationship is revealed as she is very anxious about his condition.

Grace's husband, Mathews, is a retired philosophy professor who has his own philosophy of life. He is now bedridden and requires his wife's help to accomplish the most basic day-to-day tasks. Their physical intimacy is an indication that they may have led a fulfilling life as a couple before the tragedy struck.

The children start acting up as the old couple revives their acquaintance. In the later half of the film, even Mathews joins the former couple with Achuthan helping Grace maneuver her husband's wheelchair in rough terrains. The three take a trip to a beach resort together.

At the resort, Mathews has a stroke and is rushed to the hospital. At the same hospital, Grace has a heart attack and dies, while Mathews survives. The last scene shows Mathew placing flowers at her gravestone, Achutha Menon helping him, and finally, wheeling him off somewhere as one hopes that two friends have comfort and companionship for the rest of their years.

== Cast ==
- Mohanlal as Mathews, Grace's husband
- Anupam Kher as Achutha Menon, Grace's ex-husband. Voice by Rizabawa
  - Aaryan Krishna Menon as Young Achuthan
- Jaya Prada as Grace, Mathews's wife and Achuthan's ex-wife
  - Niveda as Young Grace
- Anoop Menon as Suresh Menon, Achuthan's and Grace's son
- Niyas as Saji
- Sreenath Bhasi as Arun
- Apoorva Bose as Megha
- Dhanya Mary Varghese as Asha, Mathews's and Grace's daughter
- Navya Natarajan as Aswathy, Suresh's wife

== Production ==
Blessy claims that he has gone through almost 25 years of hibernation for Pranayam. He says, "For so many years I have been carrying the subject in me as a writer, journeying with it as visuals and words. I have now transferred that to the characters. It's like letting go of something that was your own until now. And that is painful." Blessy had discussed the storyline with writer-director Lohithadas, during the making of his Joker, in which he was the associate director. Lohithadas had told Blessy about how he had envisaged Mathews. After Bhramaram, Blessy had started writing a story based on a few youngsters but didn't feel excited about it after a while as many similar stories were flooding theatres. Suddenly the story of Pranayam came back into his mind. About the scripting, Blessy says, "The interesting thing about this script is that even before I started writing it, what I had in my mind was its last frame. So I started developing the journey back from the last frame and completed it."

P. K. Sajeev and Anne Sajeev are the producers under the banner of Fragrant Nature Film Creations. Aneesh Jacob is the executive producer. The first schedule of shooting started on 16 February 2011 at Cheranallur in Kerala. Mohanlal joined the set on 23 February. The second schedule started on June first week in Kochi. Pranayam was shot on locations, including Ernakulam, Fort Kochi, Valinokkam, Kullu Manali, and Rewari. Satheesh Kurup wielded the camera for the film. "There is an invisible spark that flashes just seeing the look or a smile of a person and when the beauty within him is revealed to you. You don't need to see a bio-data or wade through his past work. You just connect with him," explains Blessy on his decision to hand over the camera to a novice like Satheesh Kurup.

The film was released on a credit as Mohanlal's 300th. It is the third time Blessy and Mohanlal signed a bond together after Thanmathra and Bhramaram. The film will have the credit for reuniting Mohanlal and Jayaprada as a couple after Devadoothan. Mohanlal and Anupam Kher are on the screens again after Praja and Indrajaalam. Asked about his experience and challenges that he faced while working in an unfamiliar language, Anupam Kher said "Acting in a different language film is like being thrown into a swimming pool without knowing how to swim. Blessy being a good trainer, acting in Pranayam didn't pose a challenge."

Pranayam's official website was launched by Anupam Kher on 29 August 2011 at a Meet the Press program organised by the Trivandrum Press Club.

Some scenes of the song "Paatil Ee Paatil" were shot in the beach area of Kish Islands, Iran.

== Music ==
Pranayam

Soundtrack album by M. Jayachandran
- Released: 2011
- Genre: Soundtrack
- Label: Manorama Music
- Producers: PK Sajeev and Anne Sajeev

M. Jayachandran chronology
'Rathinirvedam' (2011)	Pranayam (2011)	'Swapna Sanchari' (2011)

All lyrics are written by O. N. V. Kurup; all music is composed by M. Jayachandran.

No.	Title	Artist(s)	Length
1.	"Paattil Ee Paattil"	Shreya Ghoshal
2.	"Mazhathulli Palunkukal"	Vijay Yesudas, Shreya Ghoshal
3.	"I'm Your Man"	Mohanlal
4.	"Kalamozhikalayi"	Sharreth
5.	"Paattil Ee Paattil"	P. Jayachandran

The music launch of the film was held on 9 August in Kochi. The function was attended by the film's cast and also by the music director, M. Jayachandran. Manorama Music has released a Music Special Website which welcomes reviews from the audience.

== Reception ==
The film was released coinciding with the festival of Onam on 31 August 2011.

A critic from Sify.com said, "Pranayam is in an entirely different league, far above most films that we come across in Malayalam, but still it falls short of being a brilliant one. It has some fine moments, but you will need some patience to find those, in between!".

Paresh C. Palicha of Rediff.com who published an overall negative review concluded it by writing: "Pranayam, that claimed to be an unusual love story, has to depend on its protagonists to work as it lacks depth and is much below expectations from a director of Blessy's calibre."

Anupam Kher called Pranayam as one of the seven best films of his career. He says: "Pranayam is one of the seven best films of my career. It has been a great learning experience for me." The film was widely appreciated for great performance made by Mohanlal, Anupam Kher, and Jaya Prada.

The film picked up after a slow start and the end, went on to be average in 2011, and completed 50 days in Trivandrum, Ernakulam & Trichur.

== Controversy ==
The film's plot is similar to Paul Cox's Australian film Innocence (2000). However, Blessy hasn't accepted that his movie is based on a foreign film. A controversy arose when actor Salim Kumar raised plagiarism charges against Blessy and criticized the Kerala State Film Awards jury for awarding him with the Best Director title. Noted film critic Vijayakrishnan says, "Pranayam is not only inspired by Innocence but most of the shots are also similar. The jury selected was not competent enough and the panel should be able to spot the difference between an original and a copy." Jury chairman Bhagyaraj clarifies: "I watched the Hollywood movie after Salim's criticism because I was in a dilemma whether my judgment was wrong. But now I am confident that it was correct. After watching it, I was happy that we gave the award to Blessy whose movie was clearly not based on that movie. In fact, the love triangle has been happening ever since love came into this universe. There are many movies that have this triangular formula. In fact, if Blessy had taken it from that movie, it would have given him a bad name. But now I can say that he has not taken it from that movie. In fact, the characterisation of Mohanlal has been done so well."

However, Paul Cox says that he was happy that his movie had been inspirational for Pranayam. "I am a person who believes in human virtues. If someone has adapted my film for another language, I am happy about it. Anyway, the matter would have reached courts if it were in America...Learned that a film of the same story was released in Malayalam and had won several awards. I am happy if such a thing has happened," Paul Cox said during his visit to Kerala as part of the 17th International Film Festival of Kerala.

It has also been accused that a very similar script was originally written by music director Mohan Sitara based on his own life and he wanted to direct the film on his own. Mohan Sitara says: "I can only say I'm unlucky. But, I've no complaints against Blessy." Blessy replies: "I know Mohan had a similar experience in real life. But, I'd never seen his script. "

== Awards ==
Kerala State Film Awards

- Best Director - Blessy

Film Critics Awards

- Best Film
- Best Director - Blessy
- Best Actor - Mohanlal
- Second Best Actor - Anoop Menon

Asianet Film Awards

- Best Film
- Best Actor - Mohanlal
- Best Lyricist - O. N. V. Kurup
- Best Music Director - M. Jayachandran
- Best Female Playback Singer - Shreya Ghoshal
- Special Jury Award - Jaya Prada

South Indian International Movie Awards

- Best Actor - Mohanlal
- Best Music Director - M. Jayachandran

Kerala Film Producers Association - Surya TV Film Awards

- Best Film
- Best Actor - Mohanlal
- Outstanding Performance - Jaya Pradha

Viewers Choice Awards

- Best Film
- Best Actor - Mohanlal

Vanitha Film Awards

- Best Lyricist - O.N.V. Kurup
- Best Actor - Mohanlal

Mathrubhumi Film Awards

- Best Film
- Best Lyricist - O.N.V. Kurup
- Best Actor - Mohanlal
- Best Music Director - M. Jayachandran
- Best Supporting Actress - Jaya Prada

Nana Film Awards

- Best Actress - Jaya Prada
- Best Makeup Artist - Ranjith Ambady
- Special Jury Mention - Mohanlal

Ramu Kariat Awards

- Best Actor - Mohanlal
- Best Music Director - M. Jayachandran

Reporter Film Awards

- Best Actor - Mohanlal

Amrita Film Awards

- Best Actor - Mohanlal
- Best Actress - Jaya Pradha
- Best Lyricist - O. N. V. Kurup

Kochi Times Film Awards

- Best Actor - Mohanlal
- Best Lyricist - O. N. V. Kurup
- Best Playback Singer (Female) - Shreya Ghoshal

Mirchi Music Awards South

- Best Music Director - M. Jayachandran
- Best Female Playback Singer - Shreya Ghoshal
- Best Song of the Year - "Paattil Ee Paattil"
