= 12th Asianet Film Awards =

Indian film award ceremony in 2010

- Awarded for: Best of cinema in 2009
- Date: 16 January 2010
- Location: Chandrasekharan Nair Stadium, Thiruvananthapuram
- Country: India
- Presented by: Asianet

The 12th Asianet Film Awards honored the best films in 2009 and was held on 16 January 2010 at Chandrasekharan Nair Stadium, Thiruvananthapuram. The winners were announced on 3 January 2010 by Asianet senior vice-president R. Sreekantan Nair. The title sponsor of the event was Ujala. The award were given in 25 categories.

== Winners ==
- Best Film: Pazhassi Raja
- Best Director: Ranjith for Paleri Manikyam: Oru Pathirakolapathakathinte Katha
- Best Actor: Mohanlal for Ividam Swargamaanu, Bhramaram
- Best Actress: Kavya Madhavan for Banaras
- Best Supporting Actor: Sreenivasan for Makante Achan, Passenger
- Best Supporting Actress: Shwetha Menon for Paleri Manikyam: Oru Pathirakolapathakathinte Katha
- Best Screenplay: Ranjith Sankar for Passenger
- Best Cinematographer: Ajayan Vincent for Bhramaram
- Best Editor: Vijay Shanker for Bhramaram
- Best Music Director: Deepak Dev for Puthiya Mukham
- Best Lyricist: Vayalar Sarath Chandra Varma for Neelathamara
- Best Male Playback Singer: Shankar Mahadevan for "Picha Vacha" (Puthiya Mukham)
- Best Female Playback Singer: K. S. Chithra for "Kunnathe Konnakkum" (Pazhassi Raja)
- Most Popular Actor: Dileep for Pappy Appacha, Kaaryasthan, Marykkundoru Kunjaadu
- Most Popular Actress: Lakshmi Rai for Ividam Swargamaanu
- Best Actor in a Villain Role: Lalu Alex for Ividam Swargamaanu
- Best Actor in a Comic Role: Jagadish for 2 Harihar Nagar
- Best Star Pair: Jayasurya & Roma for Utharaswayamvaram
- Best Child Artist: Baby Nivedita for Bhramaram, Kana Kanmani
- Best New Face of the Year (Male): Nishan for Ritu
- Best New Face of the Year (Female): Archana Jose Kavi for Neelathamara
- Special Jury Awards
  - R. Sarathkumar for Pazhassi Raja
  - Manoj K. Jayan for Pazhassi Raja
  - Kanika for Pazhassi Raja, Bhagyadevatha
- Special Award for his notable contribution for the Indian Film World: Resul Pookutty
- Millennium Actor: Mammootty
- Youth Icon of the Year: Prithviraj Sukumaran
- Lifetime Achievement Award: P. V. Gangadharan
