= Snehaveedu =

- Promotional Poster
- Directed by: Sathyan Anthikad
- Written by: Sathyan Anthikad
- Produced by: Antony Perumbavoor
- Starring: Mohanlal; Sheela; Rahul Pillai
- Cinematography: Venu
- Edited by: K. Rajagopal
- Music by: Ilaiyaraaja
- Production company: Aashirvad Cinemas
- Distributed by: Maxlab Cinemas and Entertainments
- Release date: 30 September 2011
- Running time: 150 minutes
- Country: India
- Language: Malayalam

Snehaveedu (transl. The affectionate house) is a 2011 Indian Malayalam-language family drama film written and directed by Sathyan Anthikad. It was produced by Antony Perumbavoor under the company Aashirvad Cinemas. The film stars Mohanlal, Sheela, and Rahul Pillai. It was Mohanlal's 300th film. The film received generally positive reviews from the critics and was a commercial success at the box office.

== Plot ==
The story revolves around the protagonist, Ajayan Menon, who has tried his luck working in different cities in India. He later went to Dubai, and returned to his village after making a fortune there to look after his aging mother Ammukutty Amma. Ajayan is very nostalgic about his native place. There, he starts an agricultural equipment manufacturing company.

One day, Karthik, a college boy from Tamil Nadu approaches Ajayan claiming to be his son. Ajayan who is known bachelor to the villagers used to boast of himself as a womanizer in his youth, is believed to be the boy's father by all the villagers. Gradually, Ammukutty Amma starts to like Karthik and a loving relationship develops between the two. Eventually, she starts to accept Karthik as Ajayan's real son, though Ajayan rejects Karthik's claim and dislikes him. Karthik is persuaded by Ammukkty Amma to get close to Ajayan and subsequent events soften Ajayan's attitude towards Karthik.

To inquire about the real identity of the boy, Ajayan travels to Chennai, where he worked 20 years ago. He finds his old friend, Seithali. Seithali reveals to Ajayan that Shanti (Karthik's mother) used to act in movies as a background dancer but died one day during the shooting of a film. This news triggered Karthik to take his own life. To console Karthik, Seithali told him that he has a father and that he is not an orphan. Seithali showed Ajayan's photo to Karthik to get him to believe the lie. Moved by Karthik's situation, Ajayan accepts Karthik as his son.

== Cast ==
- Mohanlal as Ajayan Menon
- Sheela as Ammukkutty Amma
- Biju Menon as SI Balachandran "Balan"
- Rahul Pillai as Karthik
- Padmapriya Janakiraman as Sunanda
- Reeja as Shanthi
- Lena as Lilly
- Innocent as Mathai "Karinkannan Mathai"
- K. P. A. C. Lalitha as Reethamma
- Mamukkoya as Seithali
- Chembil Ashokan as Maniyan
- Urmila Unni as Nalini
- Arundathi B. as Rosemol
- Sasi Kalinga as Kalluvazhi Krishnan Marar
- Appukutty as Pazhanisamy
- Praveen Premkumar

== Production ==
The film was reportedly first named Ammukuttiyammayude Ajayan.

== Soundtrack ==
Snehaveedu

Soundtrack album by Ilaiyaraaja
- Released: 2011
- Genre: Soundtrack
- Length: 24:54 mins
- Label: Manorama Music
- Producer: Ilaiyaraaja

Ilaiyaraaja chronology
| Hare Rama Hare Krishna (2011) | Snehaveedu (2011) | Sri Rama Rajyam (2011) |

The songs in this movie were composed by Ilaiyaraaja. The lyrics were penned by Rafeeq Ahamed. Keerthy Ramachandran of The Deccan Chronicle commented that "lyrics of Rafeeq Ahmed are worth mentioning".

| Track | Song title | Singer(s) | Duration | Raga |
|---|---|---|---|---|
| 1 | "Chengathir Kaiyum" | K. S. Chithra | 04:10 | Keeravani |
| 2 | "Amruthamayi Abhayamai (Version 1)" | Hariharan | 05.37 | Kalyani |
| 3 | "Aavani Thumbi" | Shreya Ghoshal | 04.51 | Charukesi |
| 4 | "Chandrabimbathin" | Rahul Nambiar, Shweta | 04:39 | Khamas |
| 5 | "Amruthamayi Abhayamai (Version 2)" | Rahul Nambiar | 05.37 | Kalyani |

== Reception ==
=== Critical response ===
Keerthy Ramachandran of The Deccan Chronicle gave the film three stars out of five. She wrote that the film portrays the elements of a village, typical of Anthikad films "beautifully". She also compared the plot of the film to that of Minnaram (1994) and commended the performance of Sheela, which she felt was "brilliant". However, she ended on a mixed note, writing "What disappoints is that [Sathyan] Anthikad, who has always come up with sensible themes, has failed to send any subtle message this time". Paresh C Palicha of Rediff gave the movie a rating of 2.5 stars out of 5 and said "Snehaveedu is a feel good movie". It added "In the final analysis, Sathyan Anthikad mixes and matches his recent successful films like Manassinakare, Rasthanthram and even Achuvinte Amma to make Snehaveedu, which leaves his fans with little to complain about." At Indiaglitz gave the movie a rating of 5.75 stars out of 10 stars and said "'Sneha veedu' is packed with all the signature elements of Sathyan Anthikkad that the families of Kerala admire, but a more cohesive script and convincing climax complemented by hit music should have made this a winner."

=== Box office ===
The movie received positive response from the family audience. According to Cinebuzz.co.in, the film has opened at number one position on Kerala box office registering 80 percent collections in almost all the centres and made a 100+ days run in 1 centre. According to Sify.com, Snehaveedu opened at number one position on Kerala box office. This is declared as hit.

== Awards ==
Asianet Film Awards

- Best Actor - Mohanlal
- Best Supporting Actor - Biju Menon
- Best Character Actor - Innocent
- Best Supporting Actor-Female - K. P. A. C. Lalitha
- Best Male Playback Singer - Hariharan

Mathrubhumi Film Awards

- Best Female Playback Singer - K. S. Chithra
