= Banaras (2009 film) =

- Directed by: Nemom Pushparaj
- Written by: Cheriyan Kalpakavadi; M. R. Nair (Story)
- Produced by: M. R. Nair
- Starring: Vineeth; Kavya Madhavan
- Cinematography: P. Sukumar
- Music by: M. Jayachandran
- Production company: Kashi Films
- Release date: 7 April 2009
- Country: India
- Language: Malayalam

Banaras is a 2009 Indian Malayalam-language masala film directed by Nemom Pushparaj, starring Vineeth and Kavya Madhavan in lead roles with Navya Nair playing supporting role. Set against the city of Banaras, it tells the story of a young man named Hari, who travels from Kerala to do research on folk arts at Banaras Hindu University and meets Amrita, a student at the university.

== Plot ==
Hari, a village boy and a student, is in love with his cousin, Devu. He leaves for Banaras to do his higher studies in Banaras Hindu University. There, he meets another fellow student, Amritha. Her uncle wants to marry her off to a street goon named Kishan Chand, and she asks Hari to take her to a distant place on the bike. During the trip, they take shelter in a tent organized by an old man. The old man gives them bhang and both of them drink it without knowing the consequences. They both get intoxicated and unknowingly ends up having sex with each other. The next day they both are spotted by Kishan Chand and his men who injure Hari badly and take Amritha with them.

After a few months, Hari recovers and returns to his hometown. He sells off his property and confesses to Devu that he cannot accept her. He explains to her what happened, and in desperation, Devu commits suicide. Hari goes back to Banaras and lives a sober life as he feels responsible for Devu's death. After a long time, Amritha, who is under the impression that Hari is dead, finds out about him and comes back to see him. She had given birth to Hari's son who is a big boy now. In the end, the couple unites.

== Cast ==
- Vineeth as Harikrishnan Nair (Hari)
- Kavya Madhavan as Amritha Krishnamoorthy
- Navya Nair as Devu
- Harisree Ashokan as Paropakaram Paul
- Suraj Venjaramoodu as Swami Bhogananda Chathi
- Suresh Krishna as Kishan Chand
- Devan as Professor Balakrishnan Nair (B.K. Nair)
- Jagathy Sreekumar as Kanaran
- Nedumudi Venu as M.K. Nair
- Urmila Unni as Devu's mother
- Anoop Chandran as Chandran
- Vijay Menon as Professor Ananthakrishnan
- Indulekha as Rukmini

== Soundtrack ==
Banaras

Soundtrack album by M. Jayachandran
- Released: 29 March 2009
- Genre: Feature film soundtrack
- Length: 32:05
- Label: Satyam Audios
- Producer: M. R. Nair

M. Jayachandran chronology
Orkkuka Vallappozhum (2009)	Banaras (2009)	Kancheepurathe Kalyanam (2009)

The film's soundtrack features seven songs composed by M. Jayachandran and lyrics penned by Gireesh Puthenchery, except where noted. The soundtrack was noted especially for the vocals of Shreya Ghoshal in two songs. She won the Kerala State Film Award for Best Singer for the track "Chanthu Thottille".

Track listing

No.	Title	Artist(s)	Length
1.	"Chanthu Thottille"	Shreya Ghoshal	3:40
2.	"Shivagange"	Yesudas	3:57
3.	"Madhuram Gayathi"	Shreya Ghoshal, Sudeep Kumar	4:14
4.	"Koovaram Kili"	Vijay Yesudas, Swetha Mohan	4:00
5.	"Tirichi Nazar"	Fiaz Khan	3:58
6.	"Shivagange Shilagange"	Sujatha	4:00
7.	"Folk Drama" (Lyrics by Pirappancode Murali)	Sudeep Kumar	4:35
8.	"Chanthu Thottille Chandanam"	Karaoke	3:41

== Reception ==
Unni R Nair from Indian Express wrote "Despite all these, there are things that go against the film - it doesn't offer anything spectacular and hence may not attract you to the theatres. And since it is released along with the bigger movies, it may not fare too well at the box-office." Paresh C Palicha from Rediff.com wrote" Banaras could have been a worthwhile experience if it was treated with the seriousness it deserved." Sify.com wrote" The film is at best, is a wasted opportunity. The careless approach and lack of passion ruin its chances, though there are some nice aspects like the music, costumes and a talented cast." The film ultimately became a box-office bomb.

== Awards ==
- Kerala State Film Award for Best Female Playback Singer - Shreya Ghoshal for Chanthu Thottille
- Asianet Film Awards - Best Actress for Kavya Madhavan
- Mathrubhumi- Amrita TV film awards - Best Actress for Kavya Madhavan
- Mirchi Music Awards for Female Vocalist Of The Year - Shreya Ghoshal for "Chaandhu Thottille"
- Mirchi Music Awards for Best Music Director - M. Jayachandran
- Surya TV Film Awards for Best Music Director - M. Jayachandran
- Surya TV Film Awards for Best Female Playback Singer - Shreya Ghoshal
