= Kadha Thudarunnu =

- DVD cover
- Directed by: Sathyan Anthikad
- Written by: Sathyan Anthikad
- Produced by: Thankachan Emmanuel
- Starring: Jayaram; Mamta Mohandas; Anikha Surendran
- Cinematography: Venu
- Edited by: K. Rajagopal
- Music by: Ilaiyaraaja
- Production company: True Line Cinema
- Release date: 7 May 2010
- Country: India
- Language: Malayalam

Kadha Thudarunnu (transl. The Story Continues) is a 2010 Indian Malayalam-language family drama film written and directed by Sathyan Anthikad. The film stars Jayaram, Mamta Mohandas and Anikha Surendran in the lead role, while Asif Ali in a Extended cameo appearance. In the film, Vidyalakshmi struggles to lead a normal life with her daughter after the brutal murder of her husband. However, meeting Preman, an auto-rickshaw driver, changes her life for the better.

Kadha Thudarunnu was Sathyan Anthikad's fiftieth film as a director and also the debut production of TrueLine Cinema's Thankachan Emmanuel.

== Plot ==
Vidyalakshmi, a scion of a rich Hindu aristocratic family, marries Shanavas, a Muslim, against the objections of both families. Though happily married, their life is difficult. A few years pass by and the couple now has a daughter, Laya, who is in nursery. Despite strong financial troubles, Shanavas does his best to support his family. One rainy night, on his way to purchase mangoes for his daughter, a group of goons kills Shanavas, by mistaking him for someone else. Having nowhere to go, Vidya tries her best to take care of her daughter. But the financial troubles force her to reduce her daily expenses, including the school bus for her daughter. Within a short time, she is asked to vacate the house, as there has been a long delay in the payment of rent. One morning, she sells her ornaments for the payment of rent but she loses her entire money after a thief steals it. Vidya catches an auto to drop her kid at school. Preman, the auto driver is a talkative and simple chap, with a sense of humor. Without the cash, Vidya gets out of the auto and escapes. Vidya, with nowhere to go, decides to sleep on the Railway platform with Laya.

One day, Preman finds her at the railway station and while confronted, she explains her story to him, which makes him feel sympathetic to her. He brings Vidya and Laya to his colony after the railway officers captures her for staying at the railway platform. Vidya, within a short time, captures the hearts of the people in the colony. When Preman learns she was doing her MBBS when she married and had to give up studies after that, he advises her to sit for the final year exam. With the support of the colony residents, Vidya does the MBBS examination and becomes a doctor. Her daughter, one day comes in contact with Shanavas' mother, who now wants her granddaughter returned. But Vidya politely refuses. The elder brother of Shanavas then threatens her with the support of Moulavi, but Preman intervenes and forces them to go back. With the help of her friend, Vidya gets a job in Kuwait and though not willing, she accepts it. She leaves for Kuwait with her daughter, promising to come back soon. Preman later sees an astrologer who says he has a chance of going abroad. Later, Preman is seen waiting at the beach, looking for the next news from Vidya.

== Cast ==
- Jayaram as Preman
- Mamta Mohandas as Vidyalakshmi
- Asif Ali as Shanavas Ahammed (Extended cameo appearance)
- Anikha Surendran as Laya
- Innocent as Lasar, a lottery agent
- Mamukkoya as Mamachan
- K.P.A.C.Lalitha as Omana
- Chembil Ashokan as Narayanan
- Shantha Kumari as Nancy, Lazar's wife
- Lakshmi Priya as Mallika
- Sreejith Ravi as Ratheesh
- Vettukili Prakash as Venkiti
- Manu Jose
- Shruthy Menon as Deepa
- Reshmi Boban as Razia
- Manjusha Sajish as Usha
- Sreedevi Unni as Shahida, Shanavas' mother
- Murali Mohan as Swaminathan, Vidya's father
- Deepika Mohan as Radhika, Vidya's mother
- Praveen Prem as Harichandran
- Ullas as Unni
- Kalamandalam Radhika as Principal
- Surabhi Lakshmi as TV Reporter

== Production ==
Jayaram was signed to play the main role in the film. Anthikkad approached Vidya Balan to play the lead female role, but she could not be on board due to deadline issues.Meera Jasmine, who played a leading role in Sathyan's four back-to-back films, came up, but finally Mamta Mohandas was signed, and this film became a turning point in her career.

== Awards ==
Kerala State Film Awards

- Second Best Actress - Mamta Mohandas

13th Asianet Film Awards

- Best Screenplay - Sathyan Anthikad
- Best Cinematographer - Venu
- Best Lead Actor - Jayaram
- Best Supporting Actress - Lakshmi Priya
- Best Character Actor - Innocent
- Most Popular Actress - Mamta Mohandas
- Best Child Artist (Female) - Baby Anikha
- Best Male Playback Singer - Hariharan

Filmfare Awards

- Best Actress - Mamta Mohandas
- Best Male Playback Singer - Hariharan - "Aaro Padunnu"

== Soundtrack ==
Kadha Thudarunnu

Soundtrack album by Ilaiyaraaja
- Released: 2010
- Genre: Film soundtrack
- Label: Manorama Music

The soundtrack for the film was composed by veteran composer Ilaiyaraaja, with lyrics penned by Vayalar Sarath Chandra Varma.

No.	Title	Singer(s)	Length
1.	"Aaro Paadunnu"	Hariharan, K. S. Chithra
2.	"Mazhamegha Chelin Puram"	Swetha Mohan, Vijay Yesudas
3.	"Kizhakkumala Kammallitta"	Karthik
