= 15th Asianet Film Awards =

Indian film awards ceremony in 2013

- Awarded for: Best of cinema in 2012
- Date: 20 January 2013
- Location: Kochi
- Country: India
- Presented by: Asianet

The 15th Asianet Film Awards, honoring the best films of 2012, were held on 20 January 2013 at Wellington Island, Kochi in Kerala. The title sponsor of the event was Ujala.

== Film award winners ==
Category	Winner	Film /Films
Best Film	Ustad Hotel	
Best Director	Ranjith	Spirit
Best Actor	Mohanlal	Spirit, Grandmaster
Best Actress	Kavya Madhavan	Bavuttiyude Namathil
Most Popular Actor	Prithviraj	Ayalum Njanum Thammil
Most Popular Actress	Mamta Mohandas	My Boss
Best Supporting Actor	Shankar Ramakrishnan	Spirit, Bavuttiyude Namathil
Best Supporting Actress	Lena	Spirit
Best Popular film	Spirit	
Best Male Playback Singer	Vijay Yesudas	
Best Female Playback Singer	K.S.Chithra	
Best Character Actor	Biju Menon	Run Baby Run, Ordinary
Best Character Actress	Shweta Menon	Ozhimuri
Best Actor in a Comic Role	Baburaj	Various films
Best Music Director	Gopi Sundar	Usthad Hotel
Best Lyricist	Rafeeq Ahammed	Usthad Hotel
Best Child Artist Male/Female	Dhananjay	Trivandrum Lodge
Best Script Writer	Anjali Menon	Usthad Hotel
Best Cinematographer	Jomon T. John	Thattathin Marayathu
Best Popular Singer	Ramya Nambeesan	Thattathin Marayathu, Ivan Megharoopan
Best Debut Artiste	Gauthami Nair	Second Show
Best Star Couple	Nivin Pauly-Isha Talwar	Thattathin Marayathu
Multi Faced Talent	Vineeth Sreenivasan	Thattathin Marayathu
Best Actor in a Villain Role	Murali Gopy	
Best Editing	Arun Kumar	Ee Adutha Kaalathu

== Special awards ==
Category	Winner
Guest of Honour Award	Kamal Haasan
Guest of Honour Award	Mammootty
Youth Icon of the Year	Fahad Fazil
Most Stylish Bollywood actress	Jacqueline Fernandez
Asiannet Golden Star Award	Prakash Raj
Honour Special Jury Award	Manoj K.Jayan
Honour Special Jury Award	Kunchacko Boban
Honour Special Jury Award	Anoop Chandran
Honour Special commemoration (25 years film career)	Jayaram
