= 17th Asianet Film Awards =

Indian film awards ceremony in 2015

- Awarded for: Best of cinema in 2014
- Date: 11 January 2015
- Location: Kochi
- Country: India
- Presented by: Asianet

Television/radio coverage
- Network: Asianet & Asianet Plus

The 17th Asianet Film Awards, honoring the best Malayalam films of 2014, were held on 11 January 2015 at Kochi Port Trust Stadium, Willingdon Island, Kochi, India. The title sponsor of the event was Ujala.

== Film award winners ==
Category	Winner	Film /Films
Best Film	Iyobinte Pusthakam	
Best Director	Anjali Menon	Bangalore Days
Best Actor	Mammootty	Varsham
Best Actress	Manju Warrier	How Old Are You
Most Popular Actor	Biju Menon	Vellimoonga
Most Popular Actress	Nazriya Nazim	Ohm Shanthi Oshaana
Best Supporting Actor	Tini Tom	Vellimoonga
Best Supporting Actress	Parvathy	Bangalore Days
Best Popular film	Bangalore Days	
Best Male Playback Singer	Haricharan	Bangalore Days
Best Female Playback Singer	Shweta Mohan	
Best Character Actor	Anoop Menon	1983
Best Character Actress	Asha Sarath	Varsham
Best Actor in a Comic Role	Suraj Venjaramoodu	Various films
Best Music Director	Gopi Sundar	Various films
Best Lyricist	Rafeeq Ahammed	
Best Child Artist Male/Female	Amritha Anil	How Old Are You
Best Script Writer	Gopan Chidambaram	Iyobinte Pusthakam
Best Cinematographer	Amal Neerad	Iyobinte Pusthakam
Best Popular Singer		
Best Debut Artiste	Farhaan Faasil	Njan Steve Lopez
Best Star Couple	Vineeth Sreenivasan & Namitha Pramod	Ormayundo Ee Mukham
Best Actor in a Villain Role	Jayasurya	Iyobinte Pusthakam
Best Editing	Beena Paul	Munnariyippu

== Special awards ==
Category	Winner
Performer of the Year	Fahadh Faasil
Special Award for 35 Years of Excellence	Mohanlal
Star of the Year	Dulquer Salmaan
Special Award	Mukesh
Youth Icon of the Year	Kunchacko Boban
Asianet Golden Star Award	Jayaram
Best New Face Award	Nikki Galrani
