= 16th Asianet Film Awards =

Indian film awards ceremony in 2014

- Awarded for: Best of cinema in 2013 by people's voting
- Date: January 10, 2014
- Location: Dubai
- Country: United Arab Emirates
- Presented by: Asianet
- Website: http://filmawards.asianetglobal.com/about.html https://www.youtube.com/user/Asianetindia

The 16th Ujala Asianet Film Awards geared up at Dubai drew thousands of Malayalam movie fans at the Meydan Hotel & Grand Stand on January 10, 2014. The awards were presented annually by the Asianet TV to honor the artistic and technical excellence in Malayalam film industry with over 30 award categories. They were held in Dubai for the second time after a successful show there in 2012.

== Celebrities who attended the event ==
The biggest attraction of the ceremony was Bollywood star Shah Rukh Khan, who was honored with the International Icon of Indian Cinema award. The laurel came to King Khan from a million viewers of Asianet, who had selected him for his onscreen aura and the connect that he shares with countless international fans around the world.

He was accompanied by big names from Malayalam movie industry. The show saw the attendance of stars including Mohanlal, Mammootty, Dileep, Jayaram, Innocent, Priyamani, Kavya Madhavan and also other generation next actors such as Dulquer Salmaan, Fahadh Faasil, Kunchacko Boban, Amala Paul, Nazriya Nazim and many more.

Bollywood composer and singer Shankar Mahadevan gave a live performance, featuring his chartbuster tracks. The Tamil singer Andrea Jeremiah also gave a live performance of her hit Tamil and Telugu songs. MJS, the winners of India's Dancing Superstar, also gave a performance.

Malayalam actors Kavya Madhavan, Isha Talwar, Vineeth, Asha Sarath, and gen-next sensation Nazriya Nazim also entertained the audience. Malayalam singer Rimi Tomy paid a tribute to A. R. Rahman by singing his hit songs.

== Film award winners ==
Category	Winner	Film /Films
Best Actor	Mammootty	Kunjananthante Kada, Immanuel
Best Film	Drishyam	
Best Director	Lijo Jose Pellissery	Amen
Best Actress	Amala Paul	Oru Indian Pranayakatha
Most Popular Actor	Prithviraj	Memories
Most Popular Actress	Namitha Pramod	Pullipulikalum Aattinkuttiyum
Best Character Actor	Nedumudi Venu	North 24 Katham
Best Character Actress	Meena	Drishyam
Best Male Playback Singer	Vijay Yesudas	Memories
Best Female Playback Singer	Mridula Warrier	Kalimannu
Best Supporting Actor	Siddique	Drishyam
Best Supporting Actress	Asha Sarath	Drishyam
Best Actor in a Comic Role	Biju Menon	Romans
Best Music Director	Prashanth Pillai	Amen
Best Child Artist Male/Female	Master Sanoop	Philips and the monkey pen
Best Debut Artiste (male)	Dhyan Sreenivasan	Thira
Best Debut Artiste (female)	Keerthy Suresh	Geethanjali
Best Star Couple	Nivin Pauly, Nazriya Nazim	Neram
Best Actor in a Villain Role	Kalabhavan Shajon	Drishyam
Youth Icon	Dulquer Salmaan	ABCD: American-Born Confused Desi

== Special awards ==
Category	Winner	Notes
Millennium Actor Award	Mohanlal	
Special Jury Mention	Kunchacko Boban	For his contribution in year 2013 namely Pullipulikalum Aattinkuttiyum and Romans (2013 film)
Icon of Indian Cinema	Shah Rukh Khan	
Best Tamil Actor	Kamal Haasan	
Lifetime Achievement Award	Innocent	For his overall contribution to Malayalam cinema.
Special Jury Mention	Dileep	For completing 20 years in cinema.
Special Jury Mention	Prathap Pothan	For his contribution in year 2013 namely Idukki Gold and 3 Dots
