= Aagathan =

- Theatrical poster
- Directed by: Kamal
- Screenplay by: Kamal; Kalavoor Ravikumar
- Story by: Kamal
- Produced by: Mathew Joseph
- Starring: Dileep; Sathyaraj; Charmy Kaur; Lal; Biju Menon
- Cinematography: Ajayan Vincent
- Edited by: V. Saajan
- Music by: Ouseppachan
- Production company: Via Media Entertainment
- Distributed by: Via Media Entertainment; Kalasangham Films
- Release date: 12 February 2010
- Running time: 155 minutes
- Country: India
- Language: Malayalam

Aagathan (transl. Invitee) is a 2010 Indian Malayalam-language Psychological revenge crime drama thriller film directed by Kamal and written by Kamal and Kalavoor Ravikumar from a story by Kamal. Starring Dileep, Sathyaraj (in his Malayalam debut), Charmy Kaur, Lal and Biju Menon. The music for the film was composed by Ouseppachan. The movie is about a software engineer Gautham who arrives at retired General Hareendranath Varma's house, but his arrival has a backstory.

== Plot ==
Gautham Menon’s family moves to Srinagar, where they try to settle into life in Kashmir. During a terrorist attack on the village, Gautham’s parents are killed, and his elder sister drags him away to hide behind some trees. One of the terrorists spots them, and a gunshot is heard. Gautham rushes to find his sister in hospital, where Dr. Unnithan tells him to pray for her after seeing how grave her condition is. As Gautham grows into a teenager, he earns scholastic awards, but when he hurries to the hospital to share his success with his sister, he discovers that she has died.

The story then moves to the present day, where an adult Gautham visits his elderly uncle, Dr. Unnithan, a physician and childhood mentor who was also a friend of his late father. Gautham says he has been sent to India by his employer and can be posted either in Bangalore or Chennai.

He also visits Major George Joseph, a retired Army officer who was court-martialled after arguing with his superiors while drunk. George admits that a drunk-driving accident caused the deaths of his family. He then recognises Gautham as the boy he once comforted after the military operation that killed the terrorists responsible for the attack on his village.

Meanwhile, journalist Akbar Ali visits retired General Hareendranath Varma to write his biography, and Varma reluctantly agrees. At the same time, Varma’s family is preparing for his granddaughter Shreya’s marriage to an NRI suitor. While travelling by bus with Gautham, Shreya avoids a call from her grandmother by pretending she cannot hear properly. The bus hits an old woman, and Gautham insists on taking her to hospital, asking Shreya to help. However, the driver leaves them behind. The victim’s relatives later arrive and take money from Gautham as compensation. Gautham and Shreya are then forced to wait until 10 p.m. for the next bus to Bangalore, with Shreya paying all the expenses.

By morning, Gautham has disappeared, but he has repaid her expenses and left a note. Shreya is collected by her cousin Rakhi and Rakhi’s husband, Dr. Sudhir Krishna. Coincidentally, Gautham has rented a house owned by Sudhir’s brother, where he befriends the family while carefully avoiding Shreya. Although she does not know his name, Shreya becomes fond of him. When her grandmother arrives in Bangalore, Sudhir suggests Gautham as a match for Shreya. Her grandmother approves, but Shreya, already in love with the “stranger”, refuses. Gautham later reveals to her that he is that stranger.

Varma invites Gautham to his farmhouse, where Gautham charms everyone with his manners. He even defeats Varma at chess, winning his respect. Gautham then reveals that he survived the terrorist attack carried out in the village. In private, he confronts Varma and exposes the truth: after the terrorists found him and his sister hiding, Varma, the commanding officer, killed the terrorist who threatened them, but Varma later raped Gautham’s sister, leaving her unconscious and badly injured. Varma then ordered George to report the incident as a terrorist attack. Gautham swears that he will force Varma to confess publicly.

Gautham ingratiates himself with the family, infuriating Varma, who repeatedly tries to get rid of him. Varma later attempts to kill Gautham by pointing a gun at him during a drive, but Gautham has already texted Shreya to follow them, stopping the attack. Varma then tries to trap him in a wine ageing barrel, but Gautham escapes with the help of Lawrence, Varma’s servant. He challenges Varma to reveal the truth at the engagement ceremony, and invites Varma’s former colleagues, including George, as well as the media, using Varma’s email account so that the exposure will be public.

At the ceremony, Varma appears in his Army General uniform and claims that Gautham’s accusation is a blackmail plot. He says he will shoot himself if anyone believes the story. No one responds. Gautham then dares him to shoot him if the accusation is false. Varma cannot bring himself to do it, silently admitting his guilt. The guests turn against him. Overcome with remorse, he leaves, shoots himself, and writes a confession to the President of India, returning all the honours he received.

The film ends with Shreya at the airport receiving a letter from Gautham, asking whether she still has feelings for him. She looks across the waiting area and sees him smiling at her.

== Cast ==
- Dileep as Gautham Menon
  - Roshan as Teenage Gautham
    - Master Govind as Young Gautham
- Sathyaraj as General Hareendranath Varma (Retd) (Voice dubbed by Sai Kumar),Main Antagonist
- Charmy Kaur as Shreya Varma
- Lal as Major George Joseph (Court Martialed)
- Biju Menon as Dr. Sudhir Krishna
- Innocent as Lawrence
- Zarina Wahab as Malathi Varma
- Valsala Menon as Shreya's grandmother and Varma's mother
- Rony David as Journalist Akbar Ali
- Shafna as Gautham's sister
- Anand as Gautham's father
- Archana Menon as Gautham's mother
- Majeed as Rakhi's and Deepthi's father
- Ambika Mohan as Rakhi's and Deepthi's mother
- Babu Namboothiri as Dr. Unnithan
- Shilpa Bala as Deepthi
- Reena Basheer as Rakhi
- K. B. Venu

== Production ==
Dileep signed into play the male lead while Tamil actor Sathyaraj signed into play the antagonist marking his Malayalam debut. Vidya Balan was considered to play the female lead even though she was interested in the character couldn't take up due to prior commitments. Later Mamta Mohandas signed into play the role but opted out citing health issues. Finally Telugu actress Charmy Kaur replaced the latter marking her come back to Malayalam industry after a hiatus of 8 years.

== Soundtrack ==
The film's soundtrack, composed by Ouseppachan and lyrics penned by Kaithapram, was met with positive reviews. Shreya Ghoshal, who performed one of the tracks, won the Best Female Playback Singer Award at the 13th Asianet Film Awards. She also won the Kerala Film Critics Award for Best Female Playback Singer.

| No. | Title | Artist(s) | Length |
|---|---|---|---|
| 1. | "Njan Kanavil" | Ranjith |
| 2. | "Manju Mazha" | Shreya Ghoshal |
| 3. | "Oro Kanavum" | Vijay Yesudas, Swetha Mohan |
| 4. | "Mundiri" | Franco, Amritha Suresh, Naveen, Geemon |
| 5. | "Manju Mazha" | Karthik |
| 6. | "Njan Kanavil" | Swetha Mohan |
| 7. | "Njan Kanavil (D)" | Ranjith, Swetha Mohan |

== Reception ==
The film received mixed reviews from both critics and audience. Veeyen of Nowrunning.com commented "Aagathan has an 'I know what's round the corner' quality all over it despite a stunning backdrop and an unusually subtle soundtrack. It's a psychodrama gone wrong, precisely because the denouement that it hopes to cash on is a bit too obvious, and comes at the wrong instant". The film was acclaimed well by the audience by the choreography done in the film.

=== Box office ===
The film had a hard competition with Chattambinadu, Ividam Swargamanu, Happy Husbands, Drona 2010 and Dileep's other film Body Guard. The film was declared average success at box office.
