= Body Guard (2010 film) =

2010 Indian film by Siddique

- Promotional poster
- Directed by: Siddique
- Written by: Siddique
- Produced by: Johny Sagariga
- Starring: Dileep; Nayanthara; Mithra Kurian
- Cinematography: S. Kumar
- Edited by: K. R. Gowri Shanker
- Music by: Ouseppachan
- Production company: Johnny Sagariga Film Company
- Distributed by: Johnny Sagariga Film Company
- Release date: 23 January 2010
- Running time: 157 minutes
- Country: India
- Language: Malayalam

Body Guard is a 2010 Indian Malayalam-language romantic action comedy film written and directed by Siddique. It stars Dileep with Nayanthara and Mithra Kurian in the lead. This film was Nayanthara's comeback to Malayalam cinema after a gap of four years, and it is the first time that Dileep had worked with Siddique. The music was composed by Ouseppachan with choreographer-director Prabhu Deva choreographing the song sequences.

The film released on 22 January 2010 and became a commercial success at the box office. It has been remade in four other Indian languages: in Tamil as Kaavalan, Hindi, Kannada and Telugu. The Tamil and Hindi versions were directed by Siddique himself.

== Plot ==
The film revolves around young Jayakrishnan, who has a strange habit: he adulates anyone with a trace of heroism. Whenever he develops an admiration towards a person, he prefers to move with that person as a sort of bodyguard. He starts admiring Ashokan, a former don; Abgari, liquor tycoon and at present a leading businessman. Jayakrishnan wants to be Ashokan's bodyguard, but Ashokan does not need one. Jayakrishnan understood that through Warrier Sir he could approach Ashokan. Later, Jayakrishnan approaches Ashokan with a recommendation from Warrier sir. This Warrier sir is also the close friend of Jayakrishnan's father Ramankutty master, Jayakrishnan is like a son to Warrier Sir, so he easily gets a letter from Warrier sir to become Ashokan's bodyguard. Ashokan had great respect and a strong sense of obligation to Warrier sir since his old days, so he cannot refuse his words. Jayakrishnan achieves his luck after saving Ashokan from danger. Jayakrishnan thus becomes the bodyguard of Ashokan's daughter Ammu. Jayakrishnan follows Ammu to her college as her bodyguard. Ammu and her friend Sethulakshmi get irritated with him following them all day.

Jayakrishnan takes his role as a bodyguard very seriously and follows the two girls around constantly. In an attempt to get rid of him, the girls make up a "fake lover", hoping to distract Jayakrishnan from his duties as a bodyguard, and their plan works. Jayakrishnan falls in love with a "Private Number" and is constantly looking for this girl, but he has no idea that his lover is Ammu. Ammu, as a joke, calls Jayakrishnan and speaks badly about Ammu. Jayakrishnan gets a little angry and disagrees with her. He believes Ammu is a good-hearted person. That is when the viewer is able to tell that Ammu is really falling in love with Jayakrishnan.

Ammu later tells Jayakrishnan to run away with her and meet her at a railroad station. Jayakrishnan agrees, not knowing that the girl is Ammu herself. Ashokan finds out, and he believes that Jayakrishnan and Ammu are planning to run away together. In order to save Jayakrishnan's life, Ammu lies that it is not her but Jayakrishnan is meeting another girl at the station. Ashokan lets Jayakrishnan go but tells others to kill Jayakrishnan if a girl does not show up. Terrified, Ammu sends Sethulakshmi to the station and tells her to tell Jayakrishnan that Ammu is the lover and she will not be able to make it to the station. Sethulakshmi, seeing Jayakrishnan, falls in love and admits that she is the lover and not Ammu. Ammu calls her twice, but Sethulakshmi throws the cellphone out, trying to erase Ammu out of their love life completely.

Years later, after Jayakrishnan's and Sethulakshmi's marriage, she bears a son, Siddharth, but dies. Before her death, she leaves a diary for her Siddharth telling the whole story between the phone calls and his father and Ammu. Siddharth later goes to Ammu's house with Jayakrishnan to visit Ashokan. Jayakrishnan is shocked that Ammu is not married. Siddharth asks Ammu to become his mother, and Jayakrishnan is shocked and angry at Siddharth for saying something so blunt and rude. Ashokan begs Jayakrishnan to take Ammu as his wife. They go onto the train together, but Siddharth runs and throws the diary into a trash can nearby. Jayakrishnan finds the diary and realizes that his real lover, the girl who has waited for him for so many years faithfully, was Ammu. The film ends with Jayakrishnan, Ammu, and Siddharth hugging each other.

== Cast ==
- Dileep as Jayakrishnan
- Nayanthara as Ammu, Ashokan's daughter (voiceover by Bhagyalakshmi)
- Mithra Kurian as Sethulakshmi, Ammu's best friend and later Jayakrishnan's wife (voiceover by Sreeja Ravi)
- Thiagarajan as Ashokan, Ammu's father (voiceover by Shobi Thilakan)
- Janardhanan as Balakrishna Menon, Sethulakshmi's father
- Harisree Asokan as Neelambaran
- Cochin Haneefa as Haridas, College Principal
- Zeenath as Radhamani, Ashokan's wife and Ammu's mother
- Appa Haja as Rajeevan, Ammu's brother and Aashokan's son
- Vyjayanthi as Mallika
- Guinness Pakru as Kudamaloor Balaji, Ammu's college mate
- Nandu as Ramankutty Master, Jayakrishnan's father
- Seema G. Nair as Meenu Teacher, Jayakrishnan's mother
- Rony David as Chandran, College Student
- Sidhartha Siva as Baiju, College student
- Pradeesh Nandan as Sandeep, College student
- Baiju Ezhupunna as Driver Mani
- Aneesh Ponnappan as Aneesh (College Boy)
- Ranjith as Warrier Sir (Voice only)
- Soubin Shahir as college student (cameo)

== Music ==
Bodyguard

Soundtrack album by Ouseppachan
- Released: 10 January 2010
- Recorded: 2009–10
- Genre: Feature film soundtrack
- Length: 26.09
- Label: Johny Sagariga Music Company
- Producer: Ouseppachan

Ouseppachan chronology
| Hailesa (2010) | Bodyguard (2010) | Aagathan (2010) |

=== Track listing ===
| No. | Title | Lyrics | Singer(s) | Length |
|---|---|---|---|---|
| 1. | "Kozhi Chingara" | Kaithapram | Afsal, Anitha | 4:57 |
| 2. | "Arikathayaro" | Anil Panachooran | Ranjith K Govind | 4:03 |
| 3. | "Enneyano" | Anil Panachooran | MG Sreekumar, Biju Narayanan, Rimi Tomy | 4:09 |
| 4. | "Perilla Rajyathe" | Kaithapram | Karthik, Elizabeth Raju | 4:55 |
| 5. | "Machilamma" | Kaithapram | Pradeep Palluruthy, Jyotsna | 4.31 |
| 6. | "Arikathayaro" | Anil Panachooran, Kaithapram | Yasir Sali, Elizabeth Raju | 4:02 |

== Reception ==
Sify critic said that "the whole film suffers as it has been based on a weak storyline. The amazing comedy situations that are synonymous with the director's films are generally not to be seen here ... It may not certainly be in the league of some of Siddique's earlier films; still it is worth a watch". Paresh C. Palicha of Rediff.com rated two out of five stars and stated: "After a promising premise, it seems that the director got lost. There is nothing new. Even the romance between the lead pair seems to be added as an afterthought ... Bodyguard may not be able to guard Siddique's reputation as the man with the Midas touch".

== Accolades ==
| Year | Award category | Winner | Result | Ref. |
|---|---|---|---|---|
| 2011 | Asianet Film Awards for Best Actress | Nayanthara | Won | |
