= Swapna Sanchari =

- Theatrical release poster
- Directed by: Kamal
- Written by: Girish Kumar
- Produced by: Thankachan Emmanuel
- Starring: Jayaram; Samvrutha Sunil; Innocent; Salim Kumar; Anu Emmanuel; Harisree Ashokan; Jagathy Sreekumar; Balachandran Chullikkadu; Bhama; Meera Nandan
- Cinematography: Alagappan N.
- Edited by: K. Rajagopal
- Music by: M. Jayachandran
- Production company: Trueline Cinema
- Release date: 25 November 2011
- Country: India
- Language: Malayalam

Swapna Sanchari (transl. Dream traveller) is a 2011 Indian Malayalam-language comedy drama film directed by Kamal, starring Jayaram and Samvrutha Sunil in the lead roles. It was a success at the box office. Innocent won the Asianet Film Award for Best Supporting Actor for this film.

== Plot ==
Swapna Sanchari revolves around the Middle East-returned liquor businessman named Ajaychandran Nair. He has a lovely wife, Reshmi, and a daughter, Ashwathy, in 9th standard who does not speak much. His father believes in old ways. The movie tracks his ups in life in the first half, where he returns from the Gulf with a huge pocket. He dreams of earning a big name in society, thus buying a Mercedes-Benz, an old unwanted theatre, land in front of the panchayat hall, promising hefty contributions for the community hall, and several other charitable organizations where he can put his name prominently. He undertakes running the village festival completely by himself to earn a big name.

Things start going wrong when he insults his younger sister and father and makes them leave his house for choosing to marry a simple printing press man rather than the rich man that Ajaychandran has chosen for his sister. Next, the Ulsavam that he sponsors and for which he arranges a huge cracker celebration (vedikettu) is destroyed due to a fire accident. The fireworks operator that Ajaychandran had hired turns out to be a fraud without a proper license. The fire explosion causes a few deaths, and to calm matters, Ajaychandran promises compensation to the kin of victims.

Meanwhile, things in Dubai take a turn for the worse when his partner is arrested for selling liquor without a proper license. He is forced to go back to Dubai and bail his partner out, which makes him empty his account in Dubai. Totally broke, he returns back to Kerala, where he learns that his politician friend, to whom he had trusted some cash to hand over to the kin of victims who died in a fire explosion, has cheated him by pocketing the cash himself.

He hits rock bottom when a girl whose surgery Ajaychandran had promised to sponsor doesn’t get the money on time. Ajaychandran’s daughter is shamed at school by her classmates for the same, and she tries to commit suicide by jumping off the school building. Ajaychandran comes to the hospital, where he is berated by his father and his wife for making things reach this point.

Cut to a few years later, Ajaychandran is shown to be living as a lone, battered man in a remote village. He is met by the same girl whose surgery he promised but couldn’t keep. She requests him to return home, and he is pleased to see his daughter survived the suicide attempt, though with a limp. Ajaychandran returns to his family and decides to work in Kerala as a happy man…

== Cast ==
- Jayaram as Ajayachandran Nair
- Samvrutha Sunil as Reshmi (Ajayachandran's wife)
- Anu Emmanuel as Ashwathy (Ajayachandran's daughter)
  - Bhama as older Ashwathy (Cameo)
- Innocent as Achuthan Nair (Ajayachandran's Father)
- Harisree Ashokan as Rameshan
- Salim Kumar as Sugathan
- Krupa as Ajayachandran's niece
- Balachandran Chullikkadu as Harindran, Lakshmi's father
- Jagathy Sreekumar as Devaram (the Astrologer)
- Meera Nandan as older Lakshmi
- Irshad as Raveendran Nair
- Manikandan Pattambi
- Sasi Kalinga as Kuruppu
- Kalabhavan Shajohn as Eanasu
- Shivaji Guruvayoor as Chacko financier
- Sunil Sukhada as Babu, financier
- Surabhi Lakshmi as Ajayachandran's sister
- V. K. Sreeraman as Mathew (cameo)

== Production ==
Director Kamal and actor Jayaram joined in Swapna Sanchari after a gap of 12 years. This was also the second production of Trueline Cinema's Thankachan Emmanuel.

== Soundtrack ==
#	Song	Singer(s)
1	"Vellaram Kunnileri"	Chithra, Sudeep Kumar
2	"Kilikal Paadum"	Shreya Ghoshal
3	"Yathra Pokunnu"	Madhu Balakrishnan
4	"Kilikal Paadum (Duet)"	Vijay Yesudas, Shreya Ghoshal

== Box office ==
The film collected $2,188 from UK box office. The film was declared a commercial success at the Kerala box office.
