= Manorama Music =

Indian record label

- Type: Private
- Industry: Music & Entertainment
- Genre: Various
- Founded: 1995; 31 years ago
- Headquarters: access-date=5 September 2011, Kochi, India
- Products: Music & Entertainment
- Parent: Malayala Manorama
- Website: www.manoramaonline.com/music.html

Manorama Music is a music company based in Kerala, India. The label has produced and distributed film soundtracks, devotional songs, classical music, traditional chants, Vedas, poems, music albums etc. They also release Cartoon series like Kattile Kannan, Kilukkampetty, Thakkudu, Magic Bunny, Jumbochan, Manjadi, Poopy etc. The label is owned by Malayala Manorama, one of the largest newspaper companies in India.

They have a digital presence on YouTube, Facebook, Instagram, Twitter etc. They are also present in the music streaming space through platforms like iTunes, Amazon Music, Spotify, Gaana, Saavn and Wynk.

Overall, Manorama Music is a recognized name in the Indian music industry and has played a vital role in promoting regional music culture.

== Youtube Channels ==
Following are their major YouTube channels:

- ManoramaFilmSongs
- MalayalamMovieSongs
- HinduDevotionalSongs
- MalayalamChristianSongs
- ManoramaMusic
- AnimationVideos
- Kavithakal
- CarnaticClassical
- KeralaMusic
- MalayalamAlbumSongs
- ManoramaKidsTelugu
- ManoramaKidsHindi
- ManoramaKidsTamil
- ManoramaKidsKannada
- ManoramaKidsGujarati
- ManoramaKidsBengali
- ManoramaKidsMarathi
- ManoramaKidsPunjabi
- Mappilappattukal
- MSquareMusic
- ManoramaMusicKannada
- ManoramaMusicTelugu
- ManoramaMusicTamil
- MantrasAndChantings
- MMTravelGuide
- MMTravelGuideEnglish
- MMTravelGuideTamil
- MMTravelGuideHindi
- MMTravelGuideTelugu
- MMTravelGuideKannada
- MMFoodandCooking
- MMFoodAndCookingTamil
- LatestMalayalamMovies
- MalayalamKaraokeAndLyrics
