= Cocktail (2010 film) =

- Official poster
- Directed by: Arun Kumar Aravind
- Screenplay by: Shyam Menon
- Dialogues by: Anoop Menon
- Story by: William Morrissey
- Produced by: Milan Jaleel
- Starring: Jayasurya; Anoop Menon; Samvrutha Sunil; Aparna Nair; Fahadh Faasil
- Cinematography: Pradeep Nair
- Edited by: Arun Kumar Aravind
- Music by: Ratheesh Vegha; Alphons Joseph
- Production company: Galaxy Films
- Release date: 22 October 2010
- Running time: 111 minutes
- Country: India
- Language: Malayalam

Cocktail is a 2010 Malayalam-language thriller film edited and directed by Arun Kumar Aravind (in his directorial debut). The film stars Jayasurya, Anoop Menon, Samvrutha Sunil, and Aparna Nair in the lead roles, while Innocent, Mamukkoya and Fahadh Faasil play supporting roles. The film was released on 22 October 2010.

The film was co-written by Anoop Menon and is an uncredited remake of the Canadian film Butterfly on a Wheel. It was the directorial debut of film editor Arun Kumar. The film was remade in Tamil as Athithi (2014).

== Plot ==
Ravi Abraham is one of the key brains behind a construction firm's success. Rivals within and outside the firm are jealous of his success. At home, he has a blissful life with his wife, Parvathy, and daughter, Ammu. One fine morning, things go terribly wrong for Ravi and Parvathy when a stranger asks for a lift in their car. For the first few minutes, the stranger appears to be a naive, mild guy, but his tone changes soon, and he begins to blackmail the couple, telling them that their daughter has been kidnapped and that with just one phone call from him, the new babysitter will kill her.

Ravi and Parvathy are forced to do several bizarre instructions one after another. First, the stranger asks them to withdraw the entire balance from their bank account in cash. Soon after, the stranger sets fire to the currency notes in a suitcase and throws the suitcase into a river along with their wallets. He then asks for more money, so Ravi sells his wristwatch. As the day progresses, both Ravi and Parvathy are made to drive around and perform tasks, including leaking Ravi's firm's top-secret business plans to their rival group, forcing Ravi to bargain with a sex worker, Elsa. The stranger also traps them in a sleazy lodge where he begins removing Parvathy's clothes, but stops short. At last, towards the late hours of the night, they reach the house of Ravi's boss, Naveen Krishnamurthy. Ravi is asked to shoot Naveen if he wants to have his daughter returned alive. Ravi enters the house, and to his surprise, finds his colleague, Devi, there.

Part of the drama is unveiled to the audience. The house is Devi's, the stranger is her husband, Venkatesh, and Ravi and Devi have been having an extramarital affair. It is soon revealed that all of this was a drama plotted and enacted by Venkatesh and Parvathy, both deeply hurt by their partners' deceit, to teach their spouses a lesson about the pain they themselves endured.

The last shot of the movie shows Ravi and Parvathy a year later at a hospital for the infirm. They see a paralyzed Devi, a victim of a suicide attempt, being cared for by an affectionate Venkatesh.

== Cast ==
- Jayasurya as Venkatesh
- Anoop Menon as Ravi Abraham
- Samvrutha Sunil as Parvathy, Ravi's wife
- Aparna Nair as Devi, Venkatesh's wife
- Fahadh Faasil as Naveen Krishnamurthy, Ravi's boss
- Innocent as Kalyan Krishnan, Venkatesh's cousin
- Mamukoya as Hakkim Seth
- Kani Kusruti as Elsa, the prostitute
- Lena as Dr.Susan
- Joju George as Anand, Ravi's colleague
- Esther Anil as Ravi's daughter
- Pradeep Kottayam as the restaurateur at Tipu Sultan Hotel
- Dinesh Prabhakar as a man at a bus stand approaching Elsa
- Janardhan Athri as the singer
- Mohanlal as Manu, Ravi's brother in archived footage

== Box office ==
Even though Cocktail could not manage a bumper initial, the movie picked up after a couple of days of the release. It has the dubious distinction of raising a controversy about the box-office performance. In a box-office analysis, Sify said that the film did not do well. However, an article in Expressbuzz.com, published some days after its release, said that the film is a "sleeper hit" and had a "dream run at the box office".

== Soundtrack ==
The soundtrack of the film was composed by Alphons Joseph and Ratheesh Vegha. The album features seven songs written by Anil Panachooran and Santhosh Varma.

No.	Title	Lyrics	Music	Singer(s)	Length
1.	"Neeyaam Thanalinu"	Anil Panachooran	Ratheesh Vegha	Vijay Yesudas, Thulasi Yatheendran
2.	"Vennilavinumivide"	Santhosh Varma	Alphons Joseph	Alphons Joseph
3.	"Parayatharo"	Santhosh Varma	Alphons Joseph	Sayanora
4.	"Neeyam Thanalinu"	Anil Panachooran	Ratheesh Vegha	Rahul Nambiar
5.	"Theme Music 1" (Instrumental)		Ratheesh Vegha
6.	"Theme Music 2" (Instrumental)		Ratheesh Vegha
7.	"Theme Music 3" (Instrumental)		Ratheesh Vegha
