= M. Jayachandran =

Indian music composer (born 1971)

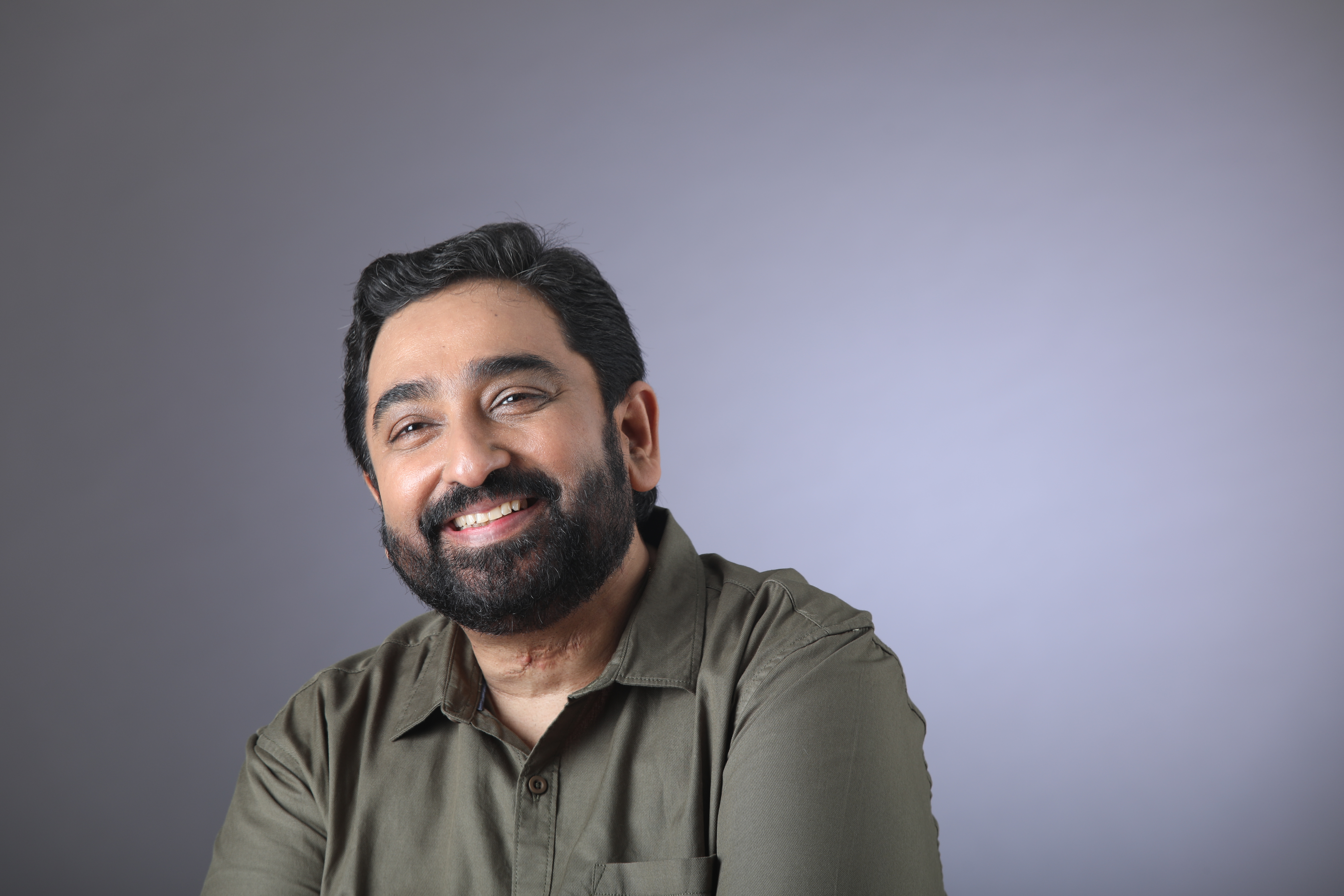
- M. Jayachandran

Background information
- Also known as: M J Sir
- Born: M. Jayachandran Nair; 14 June 1971 (age 55); Thiruvananthapuram, Kerala
- Origin: Thiruvananthapuram, Kerala, India
- Occupations: Music director, playback singer
- Years active: 1993–present

Madhusoodanan Jayachandran (born 14 June 1971) is an Indian composer, singer, and musician. He has won the Kerala State Film Award for Best Music Director a record number of nine times. In 2005, he also won the state award for best male singer. In 2015, he won the National Film Award for Best Music Direction for the film Ennu Ninte Moideen. He has composed music for 126 films.

== Early life and career ==
Jayachandran was born on 14 June 1971, at Thiruvananthapuram. He is the younger among the two sons of Madhusoodanan Nair (d. 2014) and Vijaya Nair (d. 2009).

He began learning Carnatic music at the age of 5 under Attingal Harihara Iyer and later under Perumbavoor G. Raveendranath. Thereafter, he was a student of Neyyattinkara Mohanachandran for 18 years. He won the Carnatic vocal competition at the Kerala University youth festival four times in a row from 1987 to 1990.

Jayachandran began his career in the film industry as a playback singer for the movie Vasudha in 1992 and then became an assistant to Malayalam music director G. Devarajan. In 1995, he became an independent music director through the film Chantha.

He worked at Asianet before taking up full-time music direction. He has been on the judging panel of musical reality shows in Malayalam television.

Pacha panam thathe sung by Jayachandran

== Personal life ==
He married Priya on 12 November 1995, and has two sons.

== Albums (non-film) ==
- Mangalyathaali (lyrics: Chovvalloor Krishnankutty, Chittoor Gopi, Sreemoolanagaram Ponnan, singers: various)
- Mahamaaya (2005) (lyrics: Rajeev Alunkal, singer: K. S. Chithra)
- Sandhyanjali (2005) (lyrics: Traditional, singer: K. S. Chithra)
- Unnikkannan (2005) (lyrics: Chowalloor Krishnankutty, singer: K. S. Chithra)
- Vandeham Harikrishna (2006) (lyrics: Gireesh Puthenchery, singer: K. S. Chithra)
- Padmam Sree Padmam (2008) (lyrics: S Ramesan Nair, singers: M. G. Sreekumar, Radhika Thilak)
- Aattukal Deviyamma (lyrics: various, singers: various)
- Amme Devi Mahamaye (lyrics: S. Ramesan Nair, singer: P. Jayachandran)
- Gopichandanam (lyrics: S Ramesan Nair, singer: K. S. Chithra)
- Haripriya (lyrics: S Ramesan Nair, singer: K. S. Chithra)
- Campus (2002) (lyrics: Gireesh Puthenchery, S Ramesan Nair, Rajeev Alunkal, Yogesh, singers: various)
- Kudamullapoo (2003) (lyrics: Gireesh Puthenchery, singers: K. J. Yesudas, Vijay Yesudas, K. S. Chithra)
- Iniyennum (2004) (lyrics: East Coast Vijayan, singers: various)
- Ormakkai (2005) (lyrics: East Coast Vijayan, singers: various)
- Swantham (2006) (lyrics: East Coast Vijayan, singers: various)
- Raagolsavam (lyrics: Pallippuram Mohanachandran, singers: Biju Narayanan, Srinivas, K. S. Chithra)
- Thiruvona Paattu (lyrics: Sreekumaran Thampi, singers: P. Jayachandran, K. S. Chithra)

== Television ==
TV shows as judge

- Saptaswarangal (Asianet)
- Mega Singer (Jeevan TV)
- Voice of Kerala (Surya TV)
- Gandharvasangeetham (Kairali TV)
- Star Singer (Asianet)
- Old is Gold (Surya TV)
- Super Star (Amrita TV)
- Top Singer (Flowers TV)
- Pattile Tharam (Mazhavil Manorama)

TV serials as music director

- Indulekha (Surya TV)
- Santhwanam (Asianet)
- Padathapainkili (Asianet)
- Ammayariyathe (Asianet)
- Kabani (Zee Keralam)
- Bharathi Kannamaa (Star Vijay) -Tamil
- Swathi Nakshatram Chothi (Zee Keralam)
- Chembarathi(Zee Keralam)
- Mouna Ragam (Star Vijay) -Tamil
- Vanambadi (Asianet)
- Sreekrishnan (Surya TV)
- Geethanjali (Surya TV)
- Adhiparashakthi Chottanikkarayamma (Surya TV)
- Sreeguruvayoorappan (Surya TV)
- Kalyani(Surya TV)
- Ente Sooryaputhri (Asianet)
- Swarnamayooram (Asianet)
- Veendum Jwalayayi (DD Malayalam)
- Kudumbini(Asianet)
- Sooryaputhri (Asianet)
- Innale (Surya TV)
- Black and White (Asianet)

== Awards ==
National Film Awards:

- 2015 – Best Music Director – Ennu Ninte Moideen ("Kathirunnu Kathirunnu")

Honorary

- 2012 – Swaralaya Yesudas Award

Kerala State Film Awards:

- 2003 – Best Music Director – Gaurisankaram
- 2004 – Best Music Director – Perumazhakkalam and Kathavasheshan
- 2005 – Best Play Back Singer – Nottam ("Melle Melle")
- 2007 – Best Music Director – Nivedyam
- 2008 – Best Music Director – Madampi
- 2010 – Best Music Director – Karayilekku Oru Kadal Dooram
- 2012 – Best Music Director – Celluloid
- 2016 – Best Music Director – Kamboji
- 2021 – Best Music Director- Sufiyum Sujatayum
- 2023 – Best Music Director- 19aam Noottandu

Kerala Film Critics Association Awards

- 2003 – Best Music Director - Balettan, Gaurisankaram, Kanninum Kannadikkum

Asianet Film Awards:

- 2003 – Best Music Director Award Gaurisankaram
- 2004 – Best Music Director Award Perumazhakkalam, Mampazhakkalam
- 2007 – Best Music Director Award Nivedyam
- 2011 – Best Music Director Award Pranayam

Filmfare Awards South

- 2004 – Filmfare Award for Best Music Director – Malayalam – Perumazhakkalam
- 2011 – Filmfare Award for Best Music Director – Malayalam – Pranayam
- 2013 – Filmfare Award for Best Music Director – Malayalam – Celluloid
- 2015 – Filmfare Award for Best Music Director – Malayalam – Ennu Ninte Moideen

Asiavision Awards

- 2013 – Asiavision Awards – Best Music Director

Mirchi Music Awards South

- 2009 - Best music director
- 2009 - Album of the year
- 2009 - Song of the year
- 2010 - Best music director
- 2010 - Album of the year
- 2010 - Song of the year
- 2011 - Song of the year
- 2011 - Album of the year
- 2011 - Best music director

Asianet Television Awards

- 2017 - Manninte Manamulla Sangeetham (honorary awards)
- 2017 - Best Music Director

Vijay Television Awards

- 2018 - Vijay Television Awards for Special Jury Award

Mazhavil Mango Award

- 2021 - Best Music Director
