= L2: Empuraan =

2025 Indian film by Prithviraj Sukumaran

- Theatrical release poster
- Directed by: Prithviraj Sukumaran
- Written by: Murali Gopy
- Produced by: Antony Perumbavoor; Subaskaran Allirajah; Gokulam Gopalan
- Starring: Mohanlal; Prithviraj Sukumaran; Tovino Thomas; Abhimanyu Singh; Manju Warrier; Indrajith Sukumaran; Jerome Flynn; Andrea Tivadar; Eriq Ebouaney
- Cinematography: Sujith Vaassudev
- Edited by: Akhilesh Mohan
- Music by: Deepak Dev
- Production companies: Aashirvad Cinemas; Lyca Productions; Sree Gokulam Movies
- Distributed by: see below
- Release date: 27 March 2025
- Running time: 179 minutes (Note: The film's original runtime was 179 minutes. However, due to controversy the film was re-edited and trimmed by around 2 minutes.)
- Country: India
- Language: Malayalam
- Budget: ₹150–175 crore (Note: The Financial Express reported ₹150 crore, The Hindu and The Indian Express reported ₹175 crore.)
- Box office: ₹265–268.08 crore (Note: Mint reported ₹265 crore, DNA India and The Financial Express reported ₹268 crore and Asianet News reported ₹268.05 crore.)

L2: Empuraan (Note: Also titled as L2: Empuraan – Lucifer 2; transl. Overlord; marketed as L2E) is a 2025 Indian Malayalam-language political action thriller film directed by Prithviraj Sukumaran, written by Murali Gopy and jointly produced by Antony Perumbavoor, Subaskaran Allirajah and Gokulam Gopalan through Aashirvad Cinemas, Lyca Productions and Sree Gokulam Movies. It is the standalone sequel to the Lucifer (2019) and also the second installment in the Lucifer franchise, starring Mohanlal in the lead role, along with an ensemble cast consisting of Prithviraj Sukumaran, Tovino Thomas, Abhimanyu Singh, Manju Warrier, Indrajith Sukumaran, Jerome Flynn, Andrea Tivadar, Eriq Ebouaney, Suraj Venjaramoodu, Sukant Goel and Kishore while Rick Yune and Pranav Mohanlal make cameo appearances. The film follows an international syndicate leader, Khureshi-Ab'raam, who seeks to return to Kerala after the state is threatened by a right-wing extremist, Balraj Patel, alias Baba Bajrangi, while also extending his influence in the global geopolitics.

Lucifer was conceived as a three-part film series from the outset. The first film's success led to the decision to proceed with the second in the series. It was announced in June 2019, and production, originally planned for mid-2020, faced delays due to the COVID-19 pandemic. Murali took the opportunity to expand the scale and scope of the film. The screenplay was finalised in July 2022, and pre-production began the next month. Lyca joined in September 2023, and in March 2025, Gopalan joined as a co-producer, following financial disputes with Lyca. Deepak Dev composed the original soundtrack and the background score.

Principal photography took place from October 2023 to December 2024, spanning 145 days across sporadic schedules in India, the United Arab Emirates, the United Kingdom, and the United States. Made on a ₹150–175 crore budget, L2: Empuraan was released in theatres on 27 March 2025 in standard, IMAX, EPIQ formats, and was the first Malayalam movie to release on IMAX. It is the most expensive Malayalam film to date. Upon release, it received mixed reviews from critics. However, L2: Empuraan became a commercial success and was the first Malayalam film to cross ₹250 crore (grossed over ₹265–268.05 crore). It is currently the third highest-grossing Malayalam film of all time and tenth highest-grossing Indian film of 2025.

== Plot ==
In 2002, communal riots broke out in Gujarat between the Hindus and Muslims which were orchestrated by several political groups and extremists after the Godhra train burning, forcing a young Zayed Masood and his family to flee. They seek refuge with Subhadra Ben, a kind lady and the head of a large royal family. She entrusts their safety to her nephew, Munna. However, Munna, harbouring a deep hatred towards Muslims, informs his elder brother and Hindu extremist leader, Balraj Patel. Subhadra Ben is killed by Balraj for "betraying" her community. Balraj leads a mob that massacres Zayed's family. Zayed takes his younger brother Zaheer and flees, only to later discover him dead. Zayed suddenly screams after losing his family.

In the present, six years into his tenure as the Chief Minister of Kerala, Jathin Ramdas, who has become extremely corrupt, dishonest, and selfish to the core, finds himself under investigation by several intelligence agencies for corruption and involvement in money-laundering scams. Priyadarshini, Jathin's elder sister, worries about his behavioral change as a politician and as a son. Akhanda Shakthi Morcha (ASM), a new political front, gains prominence in Kerala. Unexpectedly, Jathin announces his resignation from the IUF to form a new faction, IUF (PKR), which is allied with ASM, whose leader is Balraj, now operating under the alias Baba Bajrangi. Balraj plans to amass his wealth and create support for his party under the guise of public service by exploiting Kerala's political landscape and creating communalism in Kerala. Meanwhile, Govardhan has been investigating Stephen Nedumpally, P. K. Ramdas' adopted son, who disappeared from politics after Jathin took office.

In the UK, MI6 chief Boris Oliver has been pursuing the infamous International secret society Khureshi Ab'raam nexus. On the other hand, Interpol officer Robert McCarthy covertly conspires with Kabuga, an African crime lord, and Sergei Leonov, a former associate of Khureshi, to traffic drugs from Senegal to Guinea. Khureshi, who opposes drug trafficking, intercepts the operation along the Senegal-Guinea-Bissau border and eliminates Robert and Leonov. He arranges a meeting with Kabuga at Qaraqosh. Boris assigns his colleague, MI6 agent Michele Menuhin, Robert's friend, to track Khureshi Ab'raam. Unbeknownst to Menuhin, Boris has been secretly affiliated with Khureshi Ab'raam Nexus and leaks the information to him.

Govardhan’s search in India leads him to Daniel Rawther, a friend of Stephen, who drugs him and transports him to New York City. There, Govardhan discovers that Stephen has been living under the alternate identity Khureshi Ab’raam. Stephen reassures Govardhan that he will return to India, but first departs for Iraq to eliminate the Kabuga Cartel with the help of his deputy, Zayed Masood. After successfully killing the cartel, Stephen fakes his own death with assistance from Govardhan, Boris, and the NPTV channel, throwing Kerala’s political landscape into uncertainty. It is also revealed that Stephen had been assisting intelligence agencies, as Robert was actually a double agent.

Meanwhile, Priya protests against the construction of a controversial check dam in Nedumpally. During the protest, she is attacked by assailants arranged by Balraj but manages to escape into a forest, where she is rescued by Stephen, who has secretly returned to India. He persuades her to step forward as the IUF’s new Chief Ministerial candidate. Priya agrees, assumes leadership of the party, and enters active politics.

The next day, a large meeting is held at the party headquarters, PKR Bhavan. As Priya addresses the gathering, central investigation agencies, acting on orders from the Union Home Minister, arrive with a non-bailable warrant and arrest her on money laundering charges. Priya cooperates, and her arrest triggers widespread public support. Meanwhile, Jathin is kidnapped by Ab’raam’s mercenaries to pressure authorities until Priya is cleared.

In a flashback, it is revealed that after he lost his family, Zayed fell into the hands of the Lashkar-e-Taiba, a dangerous militant terrorist group of Pakistan, where they radicalized and brainwashed several innocent younger children into terrorism. At Khyber Pass, Pakistan, he was saved by Ab'raam, who took him under his wing and promised to help him seek revenge. Upon Priya's release, Stephen and Zayed orchestrate a showdown against Balraj and Munna at the site where Zayed's family was massacred, ultimately killing them and fulfilling Zayed's long-awaited revenge. Priyadarshini launches her political campaign. Khureshi Ab'raam gives Jathin an ultimatum: support Priya's rise to power or face death; Jathin reluctantly agrees to support Priya. Khureshi Ab'raam receives a call from Shenlong Shen, the powerful leader of world-famous Afro-Asian crime syndicate, Shen Triad, which was aligned with Kabuga. Shen kills Boris in revenge for Kabuga. As Ab'raam is still talking to Shen, a bomb detonates, exploding the helicopter escorting Jathin back home. In the post-credits scene, the Shen Triad's leader states his intention to investigate how Stephen became Khureshi-Ab’raam, delving into his past. The following scene then introduces a young Stephen in 1981 Bombay, hinting at an in-depth exploration of his origins as a crime lord.

== Cast ==
- Mohanlal as Khureshi Ab'raam / Stephen Nedumpally
  - Pranav Mohanlal as young Stephen (cameo appearance)
- Prithviraj Sukumaran as Zayed Masood
  - Karthikeya Dev as young Zayed
- Tovino Thomas as Jathin Ramdas
- Manju Warrier as Priyadarshini Ramdas
- Indrajith Sukumaran as Govardhan
- Abhimanyu Singh as Balraj Patel / Baba Bajrangi
- Jerome Flynn as Boris Oliver, an MI6 agent
- Andrea Tivadar as Michele Menuhin, an MI6 agent
- Eriq Ebouaney as Kabuga
- Suraj Venjaramoodu as Sajanachandran
- Kishore as Karthik, an IB officer
- Sukant Goel as Munna
- Fazil as Fr. Nedumpally
- Sachin Khedekar as P. K. Ramdas
- Saikumar as Mahesha Varma
- Baiju Santhosh as Murugan
- Nandhu as P. S. Peethambaran
- Shivaji Guruvayoor as Medyail Rajan
- Saniya Iyappan as Jhanvi, Priya's daughter
- Nyla Usha as Arundathi Sanjeev
- Giju John as Sanjeev Kumar
- Murugan Martin as Muthu
- Antony Perumbavoor as Daniel Rawther
- Aashish Joe Antony as Anthony Rawther
- Manikuttan as Mani
- Aneesh G. Menon as Sumesh
- Jaise Jose as Xavier
- Kalabhavan Shajohn as Aloshy Joseph (flashback appearance)
- Nikhat Khan as Subhadra Ben
- Satyajit Sharma as Masood
- Shubhangi Latkar as Bahija Begum
- Nayan Bhatt as Suraiya Bib
- Aishwarya Ohja as Haniya
- Oziel Jivani as Zaheer Masood
- Alexx O'Nell as Robert McCarthy, an Interpol officer
- Behzaad Khan as Salabath Hamza
- Mikhail Novikov as Sergei Leonov
- Rick Yune as Shelong Shen (cameo appearance)

== Production ==
=== Development ===
No official announcement of a follow-up was made for Lucifer (2019), despite its open ending. The possibility of a continuation was confirmed by writer Murali Gopy in an interview in April 2019, shortly after the release of Lucifer. He clarified that "Lucifer is definitely designed as a franchise, and it is very evident from its structure and progression." The official announcement of a second film and its title took place during a press conference on 18 June 2019. Shedding light on the meaning of the title, Prithviraj Sukumaran said that "Empuraan" signifies "someone more than a king, but less than a god", with a more literal translation being "overlord". Murali revealed that Lucifer was conceived as a series right from its inception. The success of the first film gave them confidence to proceed with L2: Empuraan, said Prithviraj. Production was planned to commence in the second half of 2020.

In September 2019, Prithviraj further revealed that L2: Empuraan is part of a three-film series. The trilogy was originally envisioned as a three-season web series, the first season was transformed into the film Lucifer, while the second and third seasons were adapted for the subsequent instalments. Prithviraj clarified that L2: Empuraan does not continue the story of Lucifer but rather delves into the events that occurred before and after it, and that they have built "a franchise structure that visits every aspect of the story". Murali hinted that L2: Empuraan would unveil more layers of the narrative. Although it maintains continuity, the film was conceived as a standalone entry, not requiring viewers to have seen the first film.

The onset of the COVID-19 pandemic in 2020 led to the postponement of the production. In September 2020, Murali presented a comprehensive design brief of L2: Empuraan to Prithviraj, who stated that it assisted him in visualising an edited and colour-corrected version of the film. Pre-production, that was set to begin in 2021, was again delayed due to the pandemic. In the meantime, Prithviraj directed another film, Bro Daddy (2022), in the third quarter of 2021. In October 2021, Prithviraj disclosed that they were still waiting for the pandemic situation to subside, as they could not proceed with location scouting under that situation and expressed hope to start filming by mid-2022.

In 2022, Murali revealed plans to "scale up the magnitude and scope" of L2: Empuraan. He was in the process of writing the screenplay in May 2022, which he completed that month. In July, Prithviraj announced the completion of L2: Empuraan's final script and informed lead actor Mohanlal and producer Antony Perumbavoor. The following month, the team officially announced through social media that they had entered the pre-production phase, "we are starting the actual process of making the film from today (17 August 2022)", Prithviraj described the film as a "commercial entertainer". In September 2023, the Tamil film production company Lyca Productions announced their involvement in the production of L2: Empuraan, marking their debut in Malayalam cinema, along with Aashirvad Cinemas, the producer of Lucifer. Additionally, Prithviraj's company Prithviraj Productions is credited for "project design". In March 2025, Sree Gokulam Movies joined the project as a co-producer, reportedly due to a financial dispute between Lyca Productions and Aashirvad Cinemas.

=== Casting ===
Mohanlal reprises his role of Khureshi Ab'raam/Stephen Nedumpally. During the film's announcement, it was revealed that Prithviraj's character Zayed Masood would have more prominence in L2: Empuraan. Prithviraj said that Zayed's role in Stephen's life is bigger than what was shown in Lucifer. Several actors from Lucifer return to reprise their roles—Tovino Thomas, Manju Warrier, Indrajith Sukumaran, Saikumar, Fazil, Baiju Santhosh, Saniya Iyappan, Sachin Khedekar, Shivaji Guruvayoor, Nandu, Nyla Usha, and Giju John, among others. Kalabhavan Shajohn, whose character Aloshy Joseph was killed off in Lucifer, made an unannounced appearance in the trailer. Following this, he personally confirmed his presence in the film.

In a December 2023 interview, Abhimanyu Singh confirmed his role as the antagonist opposite Mohanlal. Describing his character, Singh stated, "Balraj is a really complex character. He is not just one thing. There are many layers to him." Suraj Venjaramoodu portrays politician Sajanachandran. He revealed that he personally expressed his desire to be cast in the film while working with Prithviraj on the sets of Driving Licence. Karthikeya Dev, who portrayed the younger version of Prithviraj's character in Salaar: Part 1 – Ceasefire, was similarly cast as the younger Masood (Prithviraj). Nikhat Khan appears as Subhadra Ben, a regal woman who owns a haveli. Prithviraj revealed that at the time of casting, he was unaware she was Aamir Khan's sister and selected her based solely on her audition. Sukant Goel plays the role of Balraj's brothet Munna, who is an accomplice to Balraj in his crimes and political career.

British-Romanian actress Andrea Tivadar joined the cast as Michele Menuhin, an SAS operative working for MI6 and tasked with pursuing Ab'raam. British actor Jerome Flynn was cast as Boris Oliver, a significant figure in Ab'raam's journey. French actor Eriq Ebouaney plays Kabuga, a character with negative shades. Prithviraj revealed that several foreign actors they had initially considered were unable to sign due to the 2023 SAG-AFTRA strike, "we were in limbo for a while and kept waiting, but the strike just would not end and we had to move on". As a result, the team restarted the casting process with non-SAG-AFTRA actors.

There were speculations about American actor Rick Yune's involvement, but his casting remained undisclosed until the film's release. Yune portrays Shenlong Shen, the leader of the Shen Triad nexus, a rival syndicate to Khureshi's Indo-Arab nexus. Also, several other actors such as Aamir Khan and Ma Dong-seok were rumored to play the role until the release. Similarly, Pranav Mohanlal's role was kept under wraps, only revealed through a flashback scene in which he plays a young Stephen. The other new additions include Manikuttan, Kishore, Satyajit Sharma, Oziel Jivani, Aishwarya Ojha, Nayan Bhatt, Shubhangi Latkar, and Behzaad Khan.

=== Filming ===
Following a six-month-long location scouting process in India, which concluded in February 2023, the film crew embarked on a recce across several international locations. Principal photography was originally scheduled to commence on 15 August, however, it was postponed after Prithviraj sustained an injury on the sets of Vilayath Buddha. Production eventually began with a customary muhurtam shot on 5 October in Faridabad on the outskirts of Delhi and Haryana. It primarily featured foreign actors and extras. Filming was moved to Shimla, Himachal Pradesh, following a day of shooting in Faridabad. Filming also took place in Leh, Ladakh. The first schedule was completed in Ladakh on 28 October.

The crew began location scouting in the United Kingdom in November 2023. The location scouting process for the entire film spanned 18 months. The second schedule started in the UK in January 2024 and concluded later that month. In late February, filming shifted to the United States, covering various locations including New York, New Mexico, Louisiana, San Francisco, and Atlanta. This schedule featured the principal cast members, Mohanlal, Tovino, Prithviraj, and Indrajith, and continued until the second week of March. By this time, approximately 20 percent of the film had been completed. The subsequent phase of production began in April on specially constructed sets in Chennai, concluding within the same month. This phase involved Mohanlal, Tovino, Warrier, and Saniya.

By May, the production had moved to Thiruvananthapuram, where scenes were filmed at two schools with the participation of 2,000 extras, along with cast members Warrier, Suraj, Saikumar, Baiju, and Nandu. In June, the crew filmed in Kochi, before relocating to Gujarat by mid-June for the longest schedule of the production. The Gujarat schedule included scenes depicting Zayed's younger years, with Mohanlal joining the shoot. Filming took place at a palace and on custom-built sets, covering both past and present timelines. However, heavy downpour caused delays. Production resumed in Rajkot during the fourth week of September. The team shifted to Hyderabad in October for a brief schedule, reportedly at Ramoji Film City.

Later in October, the production team returned to Thiruvananthapuram. Filming was held at Kanakakkunnu Palace, The Leela Kovalam, Adimalathura Beach, and Pallippuram. This phase concluded within the same month. Additional scenes were shot in places such as Thammanam, Kuttikkanam, and Vandiperiyar during October. In November, the production moved to the United Arab Emirates and Mumbai before returning to Kerala to film in Ernakulam, Chalakudy, and Palakkad. Filming was wrapped on 1 December 2024, on the banks of the Malampuzha Reservoir, marking the conclusion of 14 months of production. L2: Empuraan was completed in 145 days, which was 28 days shorter than the originally planned schedule.

Empuraan was filmed using the anamorphic format with a 2.8:1 aspect ratio, ensuring visual consistency with the first film. Prithviraj confirmed the third instalment will follow the same approach. He mostly utilised practical effects for the action sequences. The fight sequences were choreographed by Stunt Silva. Sujith Vaassudev and Mohandas were retained as the cinematographer and art director, respectively. Nirmal Sahadev served as the film's creative director. Suresh Balaje and George Pius of Wide Angle Creations served as the film's line producers.

== Music ==
The film's original soundtrack and background score was composed by Deepak Dev, a frequent collaborator of Prithviraj. Composer Jakes Bejoy has sung a song. Usha Uthup has recorded a track. It features a theme song by Prarthana Indrajith which has English-language lyrics written by Prithviraj. The first single, "Phir Zinda" was released on 25 March 2025. The second single, "Kaavalaai Chekavar," was released on 29 March 2025. The third single, titled "Azrael," was released on 3 April 2025.

== Marketing ==
Within a week of wrapping production, the team confirmed that the first cut was finished and that post-production was progressing at a brisk pace. The release date was announced on Kerala Piravi with a poster featuring a mysterious figure dressed in white and adorned with a red Dragon, which sparked widespread discussion among fans regarding the identity and background of the character. Birthday posters were released for Mohanlal as Khureshi Abraam, Prithviraj as Zayed Masood and Indrajith as Govardhan, the latter two characters reportedly having more prominent screen presence with regards to the first instalment. The film's teaser was released on 26 January 2025 in Kochi, coinciding with the Indian Republic Day.

Similar to Lucifer, an 18-day character reveal campaign revealing the 36 principal cast members was launched as part of the film's promotional strategy. The campaign began on 9 February 2025 and concluded on 28 February 2025. The film's trailer was released on 20 March 2025.

== Release ==
=== Theatrical ===
L2: Empuraan was theatrically released worldwide on 27 March 2025, coinciding with Eid al-Fitr, Gudi Padwa and Ugadi alongside Tamil film Veera Dheera Sooran and Hindi film Sikandar. Unlike the first part, the film was released in Tamil, Telugu, Hindi, and Kannada besides its original language. It was also the first Malayalam film to be released in IMAX and EPIQ formats.

=== Distribution ===
AA Films acquired the distribution rights for North India. Dil Raju acquired the distribution rights for Andhra Pradesh and Telangana under his banner Sri Venkateswara Creations. Hombale Films acquired the distribution rights for Karnataka. Sree Gokulam Movies distributed the film in Tamil Nadu through Dream Big Films.

The overseas rights for the film, excluding the GCC and US, were acquired by Cyber Systems Australia. Phars Film distributed the film in the GCC regions. Aashirvad Hollywood and Prime Media acquired the distribution rights in the USA, while Hamsini Entertainments acquired the Canada distribution rights. RFT Entertainment acquired the distribution rights in the UK and other parts of Europe.

=== Home media ===
The film's OTT rights was acquired by JioHotstar from 24 April 2025 in Malayalam, Tamil, Telugu and Kannada languages. The Hindi version began streaming on the same platform from 23 May 2025. The satellite rights of the film is acquired by JioStar network and the original Malayalam version premiered on 17 August 2025 on Asianet.

=== Pre-sales ===
Pre-sales began overseas on 18 March 2025. In Australia, the film generated pre-sales of more than $100,000 for its opening day, surpassing The Goat Life with $69,590 on day 1. In Germany, the film generated €50,000 on its opening day, as no Malayalam film has opened above €10,000, with the highest opener previously held by The Goat Life, which had an opening weekend of €45,000. In India, pre-sales began from 21 March 2025. The film registered the highest hourly pre-sales ever recorded in Indian cinema, with 96,140 tickets sold per hour on BookMyShow. As of 2 PM on 21 March 2025, the film sold 3,10,000 tickets on BookMyShow across all Indian theatres; the highest for a Malayalam film surpassing The Goat Life which sold 3,09,000 tickets in advance bookings. In Canada, the film made $500,000 in bookings by 23 March 2025.

The film is slated for screenings at Ragam Theatre in Thrissur for a 24-hour continuous run from 27 March 6 AM to 31 March 4 AM. As of 10 PM on Sunday, 24 March 2025, the film's weekend worldwide advance sales surpassed ₹53 crore. In Germany, its four-day weekend advance booking exceeded €251,000 surpassing Pushpa 2. In Australia, the film made pre-sales of more than $601,000 by 24 March 2025. By 26 March 2025, with over 1.1 million tickets sold on BookMyShow, it is among India's highest pre-release ticket sales films. With 11.29 lakh pre-sales, it surpassed other major releases such as Jawan, Salaar, and Animal. The film headed for its release with the final pre-sales closing at ₹85 crore worldwide for the opening weekend (27–30 March), with ₹36 crore from India and ₹49 crore from overseas. For the opening day, the film made over ₹52.50 crore worldwide in bookings. In Kerala, the film made over ₹12.40 crore in bookings for the opening day, surpassing Leo that earlier attained the top spot at the Kerala opening day box office.

== Reception ==
=== Box office ===
On its opening day, the film grossed ₹68.25 crore worldwide, which was the highest opening day gross for a Malayalam film. The film continued to gross ₹34 crore on its second day, hence crossing the ₹100 crore mark in 2 days. L2: Empuraan moved on towards its first weekend grossing ₹36 crore on Saturday and ₹38 crore on Sunday to a worldwide gross of ₹175 crore (4 days). It debuted third at the Comscore Global opening weekend grossing around $20M worldwide. It secured the second place at the Comscore U.K/Ireland opening weekend with a $1.5 million making it one of the biggest regional Indian film debuts in U.K. in recent years. The first four day Kerala weekend gross was ₹42.55 crore. In 5 days, the film grossed ₹54.55 crore in Kerala; the fastest ₹50 crore entry in the state surpassing Leo. It crossed ₹200 crore worldwide within the same period.

The film grossed ₹228.75 crore completing its first week of run also taking its 7-day Kerala gross to ₹68.50 crore. On its 9th day of release, it surpassed Manjummel Boys to become the All Time top grossing Malayalam film. The film crossed ₹250 crore globally in 11 days. The worldwide gross was ₹258 crore in 14 days, was at ₹262.75 crore in 16 days, including ₹120 crore gross (₹103 crore net) in India, and ₹142 crore from overseas. The film has collected ₹86.30 crore from Kerala box office, becoming the second highest grossing film in Kerala, behind 2018. The film completed its global theatrical run with a total gross collection of ₹266.81 crore, with ₹142.25 crore from overseas, and ₹ 124.56 crore from India.

According to the Kerala Film Producers' Association, L2: Empuraan was made on a budget of ₹175.66 crore and was deemed a profitable film. They said that the film made ₹24.65 crore theatre share from Kerala alone in the five days of its release and worldwide over 100 crores share which was the first in the Malayalam cinema.

=== Critical response ===
L2: Empuraan received mixed to positive reviews from critics. On the review aggregator website Rotten Tomatoes, 70% of 8 critics' reviews are positive, with an average rating of 6.2/10. S. R. Praveen of The Hindu wrote that "Mohanlal, rich production design fail to save this sequel". Anna Mathews of Times of India gave 3.5/5 stars and wrote that "L2: Empuraan doesn't quite match the punch of Lucifer". Ganesh Aaglave of Firstpost gave 3.5/5 stars and wrote "Mohanlal & Prithviraj Sukumaran starrer action-thriller is high on swag, charisma & technical brilliance". Pooja Pillai of Eastern Eye wrote that "Despite its storytelling flaws, the film remains a grand theatrical spectacle best experienced on the big screen with all its cinematic flair." Sanjith Sidhardhan of OTTplay gave 3.5/5 stars and wrote "Prithviraj Sukumaran elevates the stakes with an ambitious but less nuanced follow-up to Lucifer". Sajin Shrijith of The Week rated 3/5 and wrote, "The second chapter of 'Lucifer' is too pre-occupied with eyeball-catching visualisation than storytelling prowess, and suffers a little as a result."

Goutham S of Pinkvilla gave 4/5 stars and wrote "Mohanlal starrer acts as mirror to socio-political narrative with string of new foes lining up to vanquish Khureshi". BVS Prakash of Deccan Chronicle gave 2.5/5 stars and wrote that "L2: Empuraan struggles to match the impact of its predecessor but remains an intriguing watch for fans of Lucifer". Janani K of India Today gave 3/5 stars and wrote "Director Prithviraj Sukumaran's L2: Empuraan is a fitting sequel to Lucifer. Mounted on a grand scale, the film displays convenient writing but makes up with stunning visuals." Anandu Suresh of The Indian Express gave 3/5 stars and wrote "Prithviraj Sukumaran's Mohanlal-starrer is certainly not another run-of-the-mill pan-Indian film that exists solely to scream "look what our star can do!". Kirubhankar Purushothaman of News18 gave 3.5/5 stars and wrote "Prithviraj Effectively Scales Up Mohanlal's Lucifer To Greater Heights".

Rohit Panikker of Times Now gave 3.5/5 stars and wrote:"L2: Empuraan is a befitting addition to the Lucifer universe, and entertains you through and through despite its extra run-time and extensive world-building." Bollywood Hungama gave 3/5 stars and wrote "L2: Empuraan boasts mass appeal, grandeur, and stellar performances." Arjun Menon of Rediff gave 3.5/5 stars and wrote "L2: Empuraan is an ambitious sequel that is bigger, bolder and timid in equal measure". Pratyusha Sista of Telangana Today wrote "L2: Empuraan is a gripping political thriller that delivers on all fronts—story, action, and performances. It's a well-connected sequel that avoids unnecessary drama, keeping audiences hooked for the entire 180-minute runtime. Whether you're a Lucifer fan or a newcomer, this film is a must-watch in theatres for its larger-than-life experience".

=== Accolades ===
Mazhavil Entertainment Awards

- Box Office Cinema of the Year – Antony Perumbavoor, Subaskaran Allirajah, Gokulam Gopalan
- Best Stunt Director – Stunt Silva

== Analysis and themes ==
L2: Empuraan delves into themes of power, identity, and vengeance, interweaving Kerala's political turbulence with elements of global crime. The film follows Khureshi Ab'raam (Mohanlal) as he navigates a dual persona, while Zayed Masood (Prithviraj Sukumaran) embarks on a quest for retribution connected to the fictionalised 2002 Gujarat riots. Its socio-political commentary—featuring a Hindutva-inspired antagonist and depictions of communal violence—has sparked controversy, resulting in scene cuts due to backlash from right-wing groups. Nevertheless, some critics have praised the film for its bold stance against communalism. While critics recognised the film's technical prowess and Mohanlal's compelling performance, they noted that the writing lacked consistency, with the "L" motif's symbolism seen as overly heavy-handed. As a midpoint in the trilogy, L2: Empuraan presents a divisive mix of spectacle and depth.

== Piracy ==
Shortly after its theatrical release on 27 March 2025, a pirated copy of L2: Empuraan began circulating on notorious websites and Telegram groups, prompting swift action from the film's team. The Kerala Film Producers' Association intensified its anti-piracy efforts in response to the leak of high-definition (HD) prints of the film. In a press release, the association announced the appointment of ethical hackers to monitor and track piracy activities using advanced digital tracking tools, with a focus on identifying individuals downloading pirated versions. The association also urged the government to establish a special team to enforce copyright laws and address the growing issue of illegal distribution of theatrical and HD prints of new releases. Antony Perumbavoor, the film's producer, filed a complaint with the Kerala cyber police, which subsequently launched an investigation into the unauthorised online distribution. Filmmakers highlighted piracy as a significant concern, particularly for pan-Indian and global releases like L2: Empuraan.

In a related development, on 2 April 2025, Kerala police sealed an internet cafe in Pappinisseri, Kannur, after discovering it was involved in downloading and distributing a pirated version of the movie. The operation followed a tip-off received by the social media monitoring cell of Kannur City Police, leading to a joint investigation by local police and the cyber cell that uncovered the pirated file. The café was shut down, and authorities indicated that a case would be registered, though no arrests were reported at the time.

== Sequel ==
As announced by the team, Lucifer is a trilogy, implying the existence of a third film as a continuation of the series. During a September 2019 event, Prithviraj mentioned that the third film will explore a much darker theme in the series. In January 2025, while talking about the cinematographic techniques used in L2: Empuraan, Prithviraj confirmed that the same techniques would be used in the third film as well.

In the film's post-credits scene, the third and final installment in the trilogy, L3: The Beginning, was announced. The film's story would revolve around the conflict between Khureshi Abr'aam and the leader of the Shen triad group, played by Rick Yune. Later, the title of the film was revealed by the music director of the film, Deepak Dev as L3: Azrael.

== Controversies ==
Following its release, the film was met with immediate criticism from right-wing political groups like Rashtriya Swayamsevak Sangh (RSS), who objected to the name of the villain as well as the portrayal of Hindutva leaders in a negative light. One of the antagonistic characters in film was named "Baba Bajrangi", which some viewers interpreted as an allusion to Bajrang Dal leader Babu Bajrangi, a convicted figure involved in the 2002 Gujarat riots who was sentenced to life imprisonment for masterminding the Naroda Patiya massacre. Mohanlal, who holds the honorary rank of Lieutenant Colonel in the Indian Army, faced criticism for acting in the film, with people calling for his rank to be revoked. The film was criticised by RSS mouthpiece Organiser as using the 2002 Gujarat riots to push an "anti-Hindu political agenda."

Tamil Nadu Rajya Sabha MP Vaiko demanded a ban on the film or removal of scenes about the Mullaperiyar Dam, citing safety and misrepresentation concerns. The film portrays the dam as "Nedumpally dam" and shows it at risk of collapsing. Former Chief Minister O. Panneerselvam also criticised the film, arguing it could harm relations between Tamil Nadu and Kerala.

On 4 April, the Tamil Nadu Assembly debated the film's controversies. Water Resources Minister Durai Murugan expressed concerns about a scene, despite not having seen the film. Chief Minister of Tamil Nadu, M K Stalin noted that the film had passed censorship without objections, with protests emerging only after its release.

=== Legal actions ===
On 4 April 2025, the Enforcement Directorate (ED) raided Gokulam Gopalan's offices in Chennai and Kochi, a producer of L2: Empuraan, over alleged Foreign Exchange Management Act (FEMA) violations. The raids, amid the film's existing controversies over its depiction of the 2002 Gujarat riots and right-wing politics, fuelled speculation of a link to its content. However, ED officials clarified that the raid concerns FEMA violations, not the film controversy. This added further complexity to the ongoing debates and protests surrounding the movie. The current raids are part of an investigation into the suspected money laundering through exaggerated collection reports of films produced and distributed by his firm, Sree Gokulam Movies. As part of an investigation into alleged financial irregularities, the ED seized ₹1.5 crore in cash and incriminating documents during searches at 10 locations across Tamil Nadu and Kerala. The investigation intensified following the seizures.

Following the controversy, the Income Tax Department issued a notice to actor and filmmaker Prithviraj Sukumaran regarding discrepancies in the payment details of films co-produced by him. The notice sought clarification on certain aspects of his income declarations related to these productions. The ED had also issued a notice to producer Antony Perumbavoor, seeking a detailed clarification into the financial transactions of the Lucifer franchise and Marakkar: Lion of the Arabian Sea (2021). The notice specifically addressed overseas distribution rights and an alleged payment made to Mohanlal in Dubai.

=== Re-edit ===
Due to the controversies surrounding the film, the makers announced over 17 voluntary changes in the film including edits to riots sequences, portrayal of violence against women, the antagonist's name as well as muting of some of the dialogues. Subsequently, three minute of visuals were said to be removed for exhibitions with effect from 31 March. Confirming the changes to film, Mohanlal expressed 'regret' for the political and social themes in the film and said that it is his duty as an artist to ensure that none of his films harbour hatred towards any political movement, ideology, or religious sect. However, two days later, 24 cuts amounting to 2 minutes and 8 seconds of visuals were certified by the CBFC, with changes made to various scenes, character names, and visuals.

In the re-censored version of the film, which was re-released on 2 April, significant changes were made to address sensitive content. One of the major alterations involved the character of Balraj, alias Baba Bajrangi, the antagonist who leads a mob. This character, originally resembling Bajrang Dal leader Babu Bajrangi—who was sentenced to life imprisonment for his involvement in the 2002 Gujarat Riots—had been renamed Baldev. Additionally, the display card that originally stated "India 2002" had been changed to "a few years ago" to avoid direct reference to the 2002 riots. Several graphic visuals, including those of vehicles passing in front of a religious structure, violence against women, and dead bodies during riot scenes, had been removed. A conversation between a young Zayed Masood (played by director Prithviraj Sukumaran) and his father during the riots was also cut.

Further cuts were made to remove references to the National Investigation Agency (NIA), particularly in scenes where the agency was shown as being misused by the ruling party to target political opponents. Audio mutes were employed to eliminate any mention of the NIA. The "Special Thanks" section of the film credits also saw some changes, with the names of actor and Union Minister of State for Petroleum Suresh Gopi and IRS officer Jyothis Mohan being removed. While the re-edited version was intended for screening in India, the uncut version of the film continued to be shown internationally. However, the streaming release, via JioHotstar, incorporated the same cuts made for the theatrical domestic version.
