= Andrea Tivadar =

British-Romanian actress (born 1989)

- Born: Andrea Maricica Tivadar; 18 March 1989 (age 37); Satu Mare, Romania
- Citizenship: British, Romanian
- Education: Queen Mary University of London
- Occupations: Actress; model; singer; entrepreneur; producer
- Years active: 2013 – present
- Website: andreativadar.com

Andrea Maricica Tivadar (born 18 March 1989) is a British-Romanian actress, model, and singer.

== Early life ==
Tivadar was born on 18 March 1989 in Satu Mare, Romania, and later grew up in England. Her first stage experience came at the age of three when she began singing in church. At seven, she took up fencing. She was also exposed to theater and dance from an early age. Tivadar earned a degree from Queen Mary University of London's (QMUL) School of Engineering and Material Science. Around 2012-2013, she moved to Barcelona to pursue a master's degree in Biomedical Engineering at the University of Barcelona but later discontinued the program to focus on a career in singing and acting. She credits the city and its people for inspiring her artistic pursuits. Tivadar identifies as Romanian-British. She is fluent in English, Romanian, Spanish and French.

== Career ==
Tivadar made her film debut in 2013, portraying Pam in the Spanish film Las aventuras de Jesús María Cristóbal Pequeño, directed by Gilles Gambino. The following year, she appeared in Gambino's Apokalipstik: Working Title (English title: Another Excellent Day). In December 2014, she appeared in Kendji Girac's debut music video, "Elle má aime". In March 2015, she was invited to sing alongside Poncho, an Argentinian band, at a music festival in Barcelona.

She worked as a model in the advertising industry, collaborating with brands such as Kipling, Palacio del Hierro, El Corte Inglés, and Louis Vuitton. Her success in television commercials—including campaigns for Honda, Coca-Cola, Disaronno, Sony, Telekom, and Hershey's—helped elevate her profile. She became the worldwide face of the watch brand Festina, alongside Gerard Butler, a role that significantly enhanced her visibility and opened doors to mainstream film and television opportunities.

In 2016, she lent her voice and motion capture performance to the animated fantasy film Kingsglaive: Final Fantasy XV. As part of the film’s promotional tour, she participated in a panel at San Diego Comic-Con. That year, she starred alongside Rachel Nichols and Laura Harring in the horror thriller Inside. Between 2018 and 2019, she appeared in three television series—Bulletproof (2018), Snatch (2018), and Killing Eve (2019). In 2019, she took on a leading role in the phycological thriller Safe Inside, portraying Ana, an American whose trip to France takes an unexpected turn. Reviewing the film, Film Threat wrote: "Tivadar is really the star of the film as this is primarily Ana’s journey. As the lead, Tivadar is working her way up the professional acting ladder and gives a compelling performance". The film was screened at several film festivals and earned nominations for Best Actress. That year, she also starred in the Spanish short film Blood Metal Revenge, which competed at the 2019 Sitges Film Festival. She was also featured in a Vogue España editorial in 2019. Tivadar is the face model for Lady in the video game Devil May Cry 5 (2019).

In 2020, she began exploring dancing, later co-creating and premiering My Body, My House, a butoh performance, in 2021. She also appeared in the Barcelona stage production Maté a un Tipo. That year, she was appointed ambassador for the Italian couture house Antonio Riva Milano during Bridal Week (2021) in Barcelona. Additionally, she became the global face of Lindt and modeled for brands such as SEAT. In 2022, she appeared in the Netflix series If Only. She also portrayed Reya, a powerful supernatural being, in the American fantasy series Warrior Nun on Netflix. She played the leading role of Jemma, a senior officer at the International Special Operations Police (ISOP), in the science fiction thriller film Rage of Stars, where she investigates a series of child kidnappings. She played a leading role as Willow, the mother in a family-centered independent horror thriller Animals of the Land. Tivadar is represented by International Artists Management.

In 2024, she played Delilah, an ensemble role in the American science fiction horror film Lumina, which explores alien abduction. In 2024, she also founded a UK-based film production company Noi Films. In 2025, she starred in the Indian action film Empuraan alongside Mohanlal and Jerome Flynn, portraying Michele Menuhin, an SAS operative working for MI6.

== Other works ==
Tivadar is one of the owners of Fancy Cocó, a clothing trading brand based in Barcelona, which later expanded to London. She also co-founded Lolita Productions, a company specializing in music, fashion, and art events. Lolita Productions has organized vintage flea markets and art events in Spain. In addition to her work in films, television, and modelling, Tivadar has been involved in stage performances and has contributed to writing plays.

== Filmography ==
Year	Title	Role	Notes
2013	Las aventuras de Jesus Maria Cristobal Pequeño	Pam	
2014	Another Excellent Day	English student	
2016	Kingsglaive: Final Fantasy XV	Crowe Altius	Motion capture; physical appearance model
2016	Inside	Alice Donovan	
2017	One Fine Day	Eleneor	
2018	Bulletproof	Sabine	Season 1
2018	Snatch	Spanish beauty	Season 2
2019	Killing Eve	Young woman	Season 2
2019	Devil May Cry 5	Lady	Video game; face model
2019	Blood Metal Revenge	Brenda	Short
2019	Safe Inside	Ana Walker	
2022	If Only	Anna	Season 1
2022	Warrior Nun	Reya	Season 2
2024	Iron Reign	Marina Casais	Season 1
2024	Lumina	Delilah	
2025	Art e Fact		Also co-producer
2025	L2: Empuraan	Michelle Menuhin	Indian film
	Rage of Stars	Jemma	
	Animals of the Land	Willow	
	Love in Verona	Sophia Rossi	
	Angel of Death	Ashley	Short

== Awards and nominations ==
Nomination

- 2019: Best Actress in Las Vegas International Film and Screenwriting Festival - Safe Inside
- 2019: Best Actress in Lady Filmmakers Festival - Safe Inside
