= Tom Ainsley =

English actor (born 1990)

- Born: 18 December 1990 (age 35); Scarborough, England
- Education: Italia Conti Academy, London, England
- Occupation: Actor
- Years active: 2014–present

Tom Ainsley (born 18 December 1990) is an English actor, best known for his role as Charlie Winthrop in How I Met Your Father.

== Early life ==
Ainsley was born in Scarborough, England. He studied acting at the Italia Conti Academy in London.

== Career ==
Ainsley started his career with a role in a single episode of long running British soap Doctors before landing a lead role in 2016 snake thriller film Serpent, as well as multi-episode roles in TV-series The Royals and Versailles. In 2021 he joined the main cast of Hulu's How I Met Your Father, a spin-off of the popular CBS sitcom How I Met Your Mother. He currently resides in Los Angeles.

== Filmography ==
Key
†	Denotes projects that have not yet been released

=== Film ===
Year	Title	Role	Notes	Ref.
2014	Gallery Girl	Mike	Short film	
2016	Jarhead 3: The Siege	Hansen	Direct-to-video	
2017	Hurt	Jack	Short film	
2017	Serpent	Adam Kealey		
2017	Boots on the Ground	Pawlo		
2019	Safe Inside	Tom Dawkins		
TBA	Sacred Evil †	Bob	Post-production	

=== Television ===
Year	Title	Role	Notes	Ref.
2014	Doctors	Johan Rose	Episode: "Wires Crossed"	
2014	Playhouse Presents	AJ	Episode: "Timeless"	
2015	The Royals	Nick Roane	Recurring role; 4 episodes	
2015	Versailles	Benoît	Recurring role; 3 episodes	
2016	Holby City	Ben Harris	Episode: "Just Get on With It"	
2022–2023	How I Met Your Father	Charlie Winthrop	Series regular; 30 episodes	
