= Inside (2016 film) =

2016 English-language Spanish film

- Theatrical release poster
- Directed by: Miguel Ángel Vivas
- Screenplay by: Jaume Balagueró; Manu Díez; Miguel Ángel Vivas
- Based on: À l'intérieur by Alexandre Bustillo
- Produced by: Adrian Guerra; Núria Valls
- Starring: Rachel Nichols; Laura Harring
- Cinematography: Josu Inchaustegui
- Edited by: Luis de la Madrid
- Music by: Víctor Reyes
- Production company: Nostromos Pictures
- Distributed by: Entertainment One (Spain); Vertical Entertainment (United States)
- Release dates: 7 October 2016 (Sitges); 28 July 2017 (Spain); 12 January 2018 (United States)
- Running time: 100 minutes
- Country: Spain
- Language: English
- Box office: US$824,414

Inside is a 2016 English-language Spanish horror film directed Miguel Ángel Vivas, who co-wrote the screenplay with Jaume Balagueró and Manu Díez. It stars Rachel Nichols and Laura Harring. The plot follows a pregnant woman pursued by a psychotic woman trying to steal her unborn child on Christmas Eve.

It is a remake of the 2007 French film of the same name. The film had its premiere on 7 October 2016 at the Sitges Film Festival.

== Plot ==
In suburban Chicago, Sarah Clarke suffers a car accident during the third trimester of her pregnancy, which leaves her husband dead, and her partially deaf.

On Christmas Eve, she prepares for her child's birth which is due Christmas Day. That morning, her neighbor and friend, Isaac, visits, and the two exchange gifts. Sarah phones her mother, who is traveling to stay with Sarah that night. After falling asleep that evening, Sarah awakens to a knock at the door from a woman claiming her car has broken down. Speaking through the closed door, Sarah tells the woman her husband is asleep, to which the stranger responds that her husband is dead, and addresses Sarah by name. Sarah phones the police, who come and investigate, but the woman has fled. She phones Isaac, but he does not answer, and she leaves him a message about the incident.

Sarah goes back to sleep, but the woman infiltrates the house and drugs her with chloroform before injecting her with oxytocin. Sarah awakens as the woman prepares to abduct her unborn child. The two fight, and Sarah flees down the hall, locking herself in the bathroom. The woman retrieves Sarah's ringing cellphone from the kitchen, which is receiving a call from Isaac. Sarah breaks the bathroom mirror, arming herself with a glass shard. Isaac enters the house and is met by the woman, who introduces herself as Sarah's mother.

After assuaging Isaac's worries, the woman attempts to usher him out of the house, but they are met by Sarah's mother who has just arrived by taxi. Her mother rushes upstairs, but Sarah, mistaking her for the woman, stabs her in the throat with the glass, killing her. Isaac rushes upstairs and witnesses the scene, but the woman stabs him in the back with a butcher knife. Sarah again locks herself in the bathroom, and begins experiencing extreme labor pains, as the woman stabs at the door repeatedly. She is deterred when Isaac's cellphone rings, receiving a call from his partner, Brian. The woman blocks the bathroom door with a chest of drawers before breaking into Isaac's house and slitting Brian's throat.

Sarah begins smashing through the bathroom door with the toilet tank lid, making a hole large enough to see through. The woman returns and tries to reach her arm through the door, but Sarah cuts her with glass. Moments later, police officers Mike and Alice return to the house to do a wellness check, and the woman poses as Sarah. Mike returns to his car, but realizes the woman was not Sarah after Alice mentions that Sarah is pregnant. Mike returns to the door, but the woman stabs him in the face as Sarah begins descending the stairs. Sarah flees to an upstairs bedroom, and Mike attempts to strangle the woman, but she stabs him to death. Noticing the door is ajar, Alice enters the house and finds Mike's body, while the woman accosts Sarah, who is hiding under a bed. Sarah beats her across the head with the toilet tank lid.

The woman subsequently shoots Alice dead with Mike's gun moments after Sarah's water breaks. A violent struggle ensues between Sarah and the woman. Sarah manages to flee outside, and attempts to drive away in the police car, but is intercepted by the woman, who causes Sarah to crash into a tree. Sarah stumbles into an adjacent house. She quickly realizes it is the home of her attacker, and finds evidence that the woman has been stalking her for months. The woman enters and the two resume fighting. They face off outside, where Sarah stumbles onto a covered swimming pool, and the woman reveals her motive: She lost her baby in the car accident that took Sarah's husband's life, and is seeking revenge. Sarah cuts through the pool cover with a scalpel, and the women fall under and struggle. When Sarah begins drowning, the woman, panicked over losing the child, cuts the pool cover and frees her, but drowns in the process. On the partly-submerged pool cover, Sarah has a water birth as police descend on the scene.

== Cast ==
- Rachel Nichols as Sarah Clarke
- Laura Harring as Madeleine
- Ben Temple as Isaac
- Gillian Apter as Sarah's mother
- Andrea Tivadar as Alice Donovan
- Craig Stevenson as Mike McCogan
- Stany Coppet as Hugo Garcia
- Richard Felix as Rick Stein
- Steve Howard as Gynecologist
- Babou Cham as Taxi driver
- Maarten Swaan as Matthew Fields
- David Chevers as Brian

== Production ==
In May 2016, it was announced that Rachel Nichols and Laura Harring had been cast as the leads of the film. The film was produced by Spanish production company Nostromos Pictures.

== Release ==
The film had its premiere at the 2016 Sitges Film Festival. It received a video-on-demand release in France on August 1, 2017.

On 2 June 2017, the first official trailer for the film was released. The film received a limited theatrical release in the United States on 12 January 2018.

=== Critical response ===
As of 2019, Inside has a 32% approval rating on the internet review aggregator Rotten Tomatoes, based on 19 reviews. Metacritic, which uses a weighted average, assigned the film a score of 36 out of 100, based on 6 critics, indicating "generally unfavorable" reviews.

Noel Murray of the Los Angeles Times gave the film a favorable review, writing that it "works on a gut level" and "makes superb use of absence. Scenes are darkly lighted and sparsely populated, and play out on spare sets with minimal dialogue. Vivas is especially successful at turning the blandness of an upscale suburb into a blank canvas for mayhem." Brian Tallerico of RogerEbert.com awarded the film one-and-a-half out of four stars, writing that "Nichols and Harring give the film more than it deserves, but their work is wasted on a movie that doesn’t know what story it’s telling."

Frank Scheck of The Hollywood Reporter felt the film lacked tension, writing that it "somehow manages to be remarkably devoid of suspense throughout its brief running time," but conceded that Nichols and Harring "go through their paces with admirable commitment." Staci Layne Wilson, writing for Dread Central, also commended the performances, writing that Nichols "is fantastic in the role, giving it her all," though she ultimately felt that fans of the original film would be "mildly disappointed" with it overall.
