= Tien Tran =

American comedian, actress, and writer

- Born: Chester, Pennsylvania
- Education: Boston College
- Occupations: Comedian, actor

Hanh Tien Tran, is an American comedian, actress, and writer. She is best known for her role as Ellen in the comedy series How I Met Your Father (2022) and Lucy in the comedy series Mr. Throwback (2024).

== Early life ==
Tran was born in Chester, Pennsylvania, and grew up in Erie and Millcreek Township. Her parents are Vietnamese refugees who immigrated to the United States in 1979. She graduated from Boston College with a degree in biology, where she was part of the sketch comedy group Hello Shovelhead.

== Career ==
In 2017, she was a cast member at The Second City in Chicago, where she had previously been a recipient of the Second City's Bob Curry Fellowship.

During 2017–2020, she appeared in guest roles in several TV series, including Easy, Hot Date, Sherman's Showcase, and Space Force. In 2021, she was a staff writer for the second season of Work in Progress, and co-wrote and appeared in one episode. She also appeared in the Chicago-set horror film Candyman and an episode of the comedy series South Side.

In 2021, Tran was cast as a series regular in the Hulu sitcom How I Met Your Father, a spin-off of the series How I Met Your Mother. She plays Ellen, who moves to New York from a small farming town in Iowa after divorcing her wife. The series aired for two seasons from 2022 to 2023. In 2024, she appeared in a recurring role in the Peacock comedy series Mr. Throwback.

Tran is a regular contributor to the feminist podcast Hysteria, hosted on Crooked Media. In 2023, she co-hosted the podcast In These Cleats with Angel City FC defender Paige Nielsen, which launched during the 2023 FIFA Women's World Cup and covered women's soccer. Since 2024, she has co-hosted the queer and women's sports-focused podcast Jockular with E. R. Fightmaster and Katie Kershaw.

== Personal life ==
Tran is openly lesbian. Tran's older sister Tram-Anh Tran starred in the 1990s children's television series Ghostwriter.

== Filmography ==
=== Film ===
Year	Title	Role	Notes
2021	Candyman	Jane Ji	

=== Television ===
Year	Title	Role	Notes
1992-1993	Ghostwriter	Linda Nguyen	3 episodes
2017	Easy	Ly	Episode: "Lady Cha Cha"
2017-2018	Hot Date	Laura	4 episodes
2019	Sherman's Showcase	Asian Aunt Viv	Episode: "Behind the Charade"
2020	Space Force	Sheila Cholosternin	Episode: "The Launch"
2021	Q-Force	Alix	Episode: "Deb's BBQ" (voice)
2021	Work in Progress	Workshop Leader	Actress & writer, episode: "Eleanor Roosevelt"; Staff writer: 10 episodes
2021	South Side	Jenny	Episode: "Chicago's #1 Party Promoter"
2022–2023	How I Met Your Father	Ellen	Main role
2022	Star Trek: Lower Decks	Anya	Episode: "Hear All, Trust Nothing" (voice)
2024	Mr. Throwback	Lucy	Recurring role
