= E. R. Fightmaster =

American actor, producer, and writer

- Fightmaster performing at Kilby Block Party in May 2026
- Born: Emily Rogers Fightmaster; June 8, 1992 (age 34); Cincinnati, Ohio, U.S.
- Education: University of Cincinnati (attended); DePaul University (BA)
- Occupations: Actor, producer, writer
- Years active: 2019–present

Emmett Rogers Fightmaster (born 8 June 1992), known professionally as E. R. Fightmaster, is an American actor, producer, and writer. Fightmaster is known for their work on Grey's Anatomy as Dr. Kai Bartley, and through their solo music project Fightmaster (stylized in all caps) with their 2023 EP Violence.

== Early life and education ==
Fightmaster grew up in Cincinnati, Ohio, attending the Seven Hills School. They then started college at the University of Cincinnati before moving to Chicago and earning a degree in women's and gender studies from DePaul University.

== Acting career ==
Fightmaster is a former member of The Second City's Chicago and touring companies. Their previous work includes performing with Boom Chicago, an English-language comedy troupe in Amsterdam. In 2020, Fightmaster was named a CBS creative and writing team member to lead the studio's actors showcase, formerly known as the CBS Diversity Sketch Comedy Showcase.

Following a two-season stint on Hulu's Shrill in 2021, Fightmaster was cast in a recurring role on Grey's Anatomy as the show's first non-binary doctor, Kai Bartley.

Fightmaster was cast in the 2025 film Sorry, Baby, playing Fran.

== Musical career ==
Aside from acting work, they are one half of the music duo Twin. They also started a solo music project named FIGHTMASTER in August 2023, releasing their debut EP Violence on October 20, 2023. In June 2024, they released Bloodshed Baby, their second EP.

Fightmaster performed as the opener during Orla Gartland's tour in the United States in 2025.

On April 8, 2026, Fightmaster released "All Or Nothing" and announced it as the lead single of their debut album, Tolerance. Speaking about the writing of the album, they said “I wanted to break through more personally on this album. I really wanted to give people a part of myself… I would decide that a song felt good if it hurt a little bit. There had to be this real truth to it. And that requires a lack of wall between self and the audience.” In the leadup to the release of their debut album, Fightmaster toured as a supporting act for Lucy Dacus and Lord Huron. The album Tolerance was released on June 5, 2026.

== Podcasting career ==
Beginning in 2024, Fightmaster has co-hosted Jockular, a queer and women's sports-centered podcast, alongside Tien Tran and Katie Kershaw. In 2026, they announced that their podcast would be ending.

== Personal life ==
Fightmaster is non-binary and queer, using they/them pronouns.

Fightmaster is their real surname. "People will never stop asking me how it's spelled," they told the Chicago Tribune in 2018.

== Filmography ==
Year	Title	Role	Notes
2019	Tales from the Closet	Themself	TV series (2 episodes); credited as Emily Fightmaster
2019, 2021	Work in Progress	Alexis	TV series (2 episodes)
2020	Yew Boys	Gill	Short film; also producer; credited as Emily Fightmaster
2020	Pathetic Woman	Andy	Short film; also producer and writer; credited as Emily Fightmaster
2020	Ancient Methods	Tara-Jay	Short film; credited as Emily Fightmaster
2020–2021	Shrill	Em / Emily	TV series (12 episodes)
2021–2023	Grey's Anatomy	Dr. Kai Bartley	TV series; Recurring role (Seasons 18-19)
2025	Sorry, Baby	Fran	Feature film
