= Safe Inside (film) =

2019 film

- Poster
- Directed by: Renata Gabryjelska
- Screenplay by: Blazej Dzikowski
- Story by: Renata Gabryjelska
- Produced by: Stanislaw Tyczynski; Magdalena Jaworska
- Starring: Steven Brand; Tom Ainsley; Andrea Tivadar
- Cinematography: Piotr Kukla
- Edited by: Agnieszka Glińska
- Music by: Elia Cmíral
- Production company: Next Holding
- Distributed by: Gravitas Ventures
- Release date: October 16, 2019 (SDIFF)
- Running time: 97 minutes
- Countries: Poland; Luxembourg
- Language: English

Safe Inside is a 2019 psychological thriller film directed by Renata Gabryjelska and written by Blazej Dzikowski. It stars Steven Brand, Tom Ainsley, and Andrea Tivadar. The plot follows Ana (Tivadar) and Tom (Ainsley), an American couple, travelling to rural France for farm work. After their bus crashes, they wake up alone and walk to their host Richard's (Brand) mansion. The film's music was composed by Elia Cmíral.

The film won Best Thriller Feature award at the 2019 San Diego International Film Festival. It also won Best Director, Best Thriller, and Best Cinematography at the Las Vegas International Film and Screenwriting Competition.

== Plot ==
Ana and her boyfriend Tom, an American couple exploring Europe, take a coach to a remote region in France, where they plan to work on a farm owned by Richard. However, their journey takes a turn when the coach crashes. Upon regaining consciousness, they find themselves alone, with the other passengers gone. Left with no other choice, they make their way on foot to Richard's mansion.

== Cast ==
- Steven Brand as Richard Rolle
- Tom Ainsley as Tom Dawkins
- Andrea Tivadar as Ana Walker
- Nicolas Navazo as Dr. Baptiste
- Joanna Kulig as Sylvia
- Patrice Nieckowski as Paysan
- Krzysztof Rogowski as Jean-Luc

== Production ==
Safe Inside is a Polish-Luxembourg production made in English language. The directorial debut of Renata Gabryjelska, its screenplay, written by Błażej Dzikowski, was inspired by events from Gabryjelska's life. Although the film is set in France, it was shot in Poland.

== Release ==
Safe Inside was screened on 16 October 2019 at the San Diego International Film Festival. It was released on digital platforms on 7 June 2021.

Festival screenings

- San Diego International Film Festival, 2019
- Polish Film Festival of America, 2020
- Debut Films Festival Youth and Film (Poland), 2021 – Official selection for competition
- Tofifest, 2020 – Official competition

== Critical response ==
Rating 8/10, Alan Ng of Film Threat stated: "As far as low budget thrillers go, Safe Inside balances the thrills beautifully, but the film's score does overplay its hand on occasion. Visually, the imagery and the meaning behind it is fantastic. The locations and set pieces are beautiful". Leslie Felperin of The Guardian rated two out of five stars and described the film as "a flawed thriller with a doozy of a twist", although she commended "the cast is toothsome and pleasant to watch, especially Tivadar".

== Accolades ==
Award	Category	Recipient	Result	Ref.
San Diego International Film Festival	Best Thriller Feature	Renata Gabryjelska	Won	
San Diego International Film Festival	Chris Brinker Award	Renata Gabryjelska	Nominated	
Las Vegas International Film and Screenwriting Competition	Best Director	Renata Gabryjelska	Won	
Las Vegas International Film and Screenwriting Competition	Best Thriller	Stanislaw Tycznski	Won	
Las Vegas International Film and Screenwriting Competition	Best Cinematography	Piotr Kukla	Won	
Las Vegas International Film and Screenwriting Competition	Best Film	Magdalena Jaworska, Stanislaw Tyczynski	Nominated	
Las Vegas International Film and Screenwriting Competition	Best International Film	Renata Gabryjelska	Nominated	
Las Vegas International Film and Screenwriting Competition	Best Film Score	Elia Cmíral	Nominated	
Las Vegas International Film and Screenwriting Competition	Best Film Editing	Agnieska Glinska	Nominated	
Las Vegas International Film and Screenwriting Competition	Best Actor	Steven Brand	Nominated	
Las Vegas International Film and Screenwriting Competition	Best Actress	Andrea Tivadar	Nominated	
Las Vegas International Film and Screenwriting Competition	Best Supporting Actor	Tom Ainsley	Nominated	
Global Music Awards	Silver Medal	Elia Cmíral	Won	
Lady Filmmakers Festival	Best Foreign Film	Magdalena Jaworska, Stanislaw Tyczynski	Won	
Lady Filmmakers Festival	Best Actor	Steven Brand	Won	
Lady Filmmakers Festival	Best Actress	Andrea Tivadar	Nominated	
Lady Filmmakers Festival	Best Supporting Actor	Tom Ainsley	Nominated	
