= How I Met Your Father =

American sitcom (2022–2023)

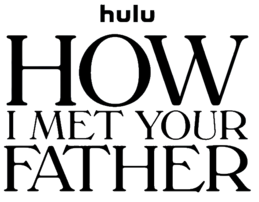
- Genre: Sitcom
- Created by: Isaac Aptaker & Elizabeth Berger
- Inspired by: How I Met Your Mother by Carter Bays & Craig Thomas
- Starring: Hilary Duff; Christopher Lowell; Francia Raisa; Suraj Sharma; Tom Ainsley; Tien Tran; Kim Cattrall
- Opening theme: "Hey Beautiful" by Lennon Stella
- Composer: Jeff Cardoni
- Country of origin: United States
- Original language: English
- No. of seasons: 2
- No. of episodes: 30

Production
- Executive producers: Isaac Aptaker & Elizabeth Berger; Carter Bays & Craig Thomas; Pamela Fryman; Adam Londy; Suzy Mamann Greenberg
- Producers: Hilary Duff; Jeremy Roth; Stewart Halpern-Fingerhut
- Cinematography: Gary Baum
- Editors: Russell Griffin, ACE; Sue Federman; Michael Karlich
- Running time: 22–25 minutes
- Production companies: Bays Thomas Productions; The Walk-Up Company; 20th Television

Original release
- Network: Hulu
- Release: January 18, 2022 – July 11, 2023

Related
- How I Met Your Mother; How I Met Your Dad

How I Met Your Father (abbreviated as HIMYF) is an American sitcom created by Isaac Aptaker and Elizabeth Berger. It was released on Hulu from January 18, 2022, until July 11, 2023. It is a spin-off of the television series How I Met Your Mother (2005–14). The series, which stars Hilary Duff, Christopher Lowell, Francia Raisa, Suraj Sharma, Tom Ainsley, Tien Tran, and Kim Cattrall, follows the main character, Sophie (Duff), and her group of friends in Manhattan. As a frame story, Sophie (Cattrall), in the year 2050, recounts to her unseen son the events that followed meeting his father in January 2022, and how they ultimately had him.

The television show won four Creative Arts Emmy Awards. Receiving mixed reviews from critics, How I Met Your Father was ultimately canceled after two seasons in September 2023.

== Cast and characters ==
=== Main ===
- Hilary Duff as Sophie Tompkins, a hopelessly romantic photographer who is looking for her soulmate.
- Francia Raisa as Valentina Morales, an impulsive assistant-stylist who is also Sophie's best friend and roommate and Charlie's love interest.
- Suraj Sharma as Sid, Jesse's best friend and roommate who owns a bar. He is introduced as engaged to his long-distance girlfriend Hannah.
- Christopher Lowell as Jesse Walker, an aspiring musician who works as an Uber driver and music teacher. He becomes an internet meme after his ex-girlfriend, Meredith, leaves him following a failed marriage proposal. He lives with Sid in Ted and Marshall's old apartment.
- Tom Ainsley as Charlie Winthrop, a British aristocrat who abandons his inheritance to follow his love interest Valentina to New York after meeting her at London Fashion Week. He later moves in with Ellen and the two become roommates, before being hired by Sid as a bartender.
- Tien Tran as Ellen Gilbert, Jesse's adoptive sister who moves to New York City to find romance after her divorce from her wife. She owns a produce farm.
- Kim Cattrall as future Sophie, who in the year 2050 tells her son the story of how she met his father.

In addition, Stony Blyden co-stars as Jasper, a bartender at Sid's bar, in season 1.

=== Recurring ===
- Daniel Augustin as Ian, Sophie's Tinder date. He is a marine biologist who moves to Australia in the pilot episode, but returns to New York in the season 1 finale.
- Ashley Reyes as Hannah, Sid's longtime girlfriend to whom he gets engaged in the pilot. She works as a surgeon in Los Angeles, and later elopes with Sid in the season 1 finale after learning that her fellowship has been extended.
- Leighton Meester as Meredith, a popular musician and Jesse's ex-girlfriend who publicly rejected his marriage proposal
- Josh Peck as Drew, (Note: Josh Peck is credited as "Special guest star", but is a recurring cast member.) the vice principal at the school where Jesse teaches music lessons and Sophie's boyfriend for most of season 1
- Aby James as Rachel, a new neighbor in Charlie and Ellen's apartment building and Ellen's love interest
- Michael Cimino as Swish (season 2), a college student that Valentina is briefly engaged to
- Meaghan Rath as Parker (season 2), Jesse's co-worker

=== Guest stars ===
- Paget Brewster as Lori, Sophie's mother, a notorious party girl who had Sophie when she was young
- Dan Bucatinsky as Fred, Valentina's boss
- Michael Barbaro as himself
- Meghan Trainor as Ramona (season 2), Sophie's neighbor
- Mark Consuelos as Juan (season 2), Valentina's father
- Constance Marie as Raquel (season 2), Valentina's mother
- Judge Judy Sheindlin as herself (season 2)
- John Corbett as Robert (season 2), a meticulous chef Sophie meets at a Broadway opening after-party
- Clark Gregg as Nick (season 2), the current owner of Nick's of Staten Island, who is Sophie's father
- Lance Bass as himself (season 2)
- Joey Fatone as himself (season 2)
- Eden Sher as Deirdre (season 2)
- Lalaine as Miranda Sanchez (archive footage, uncredited)

=== How I Met Your Mother role reprisals ===
- Kyle MacLachlan as The Captain (season 1)
- Laura Bell Bundy as Becky (season 1), the Captain's third wife who eventually leaves him
- Cobie Smulders as Robin Scherbatsky (season 1), a news reporter whom Sophie encounters
- Joe Nieves as Carl the Bartender (season 1)
- Neil Patrick Harris as Barney Stinson (season 2), a former womanizer whom Sophie rear-ends
- Alexis Denisof as Sandy Rivers (season 2), a perverted newsman who interviews Meredith and Jesse

== Episodes ==
Season	Episodes	Originally released	
Season	Episodes	First released	Last released
1	10	January 18, 2022	March 15, 2022
2	20	January 24, 2023	July 11, 2023

=== Season 1 (2022) ===
No. overall	No. in season	Title	Directed by	Written by	Original release date	Prod. code
1	1	"Pilot"	Pamela Fryman	Isaac Aptaker & Elizabeth Berger and Carter Bays & Craig Thomas & Emily Spivey	January 18, 2022	1HME01
In 2022, on her way to a promising date after a series of failed ones, Sophie meets Uber driver Jesse and his friend Sid. Sophie's date with Ian is perfect, but he is moving to Australia. Sophie's roommate Valentina reveals her new British boyfriend, Charlie, who has moved across the world to be with her. When Sophie realizes she has swapped phones with Sid, they rush to Sid's bar, meeting Ellen, Jesse's recently divorced sister from Iowa. Sid gets engaged to his long-distance girlfriend, Hannah. Sophie tells Jesse her plan to walk the Brooklyn Bridge with her soulmate, but Jesse is cynical about love after his public rejection went viral. At the airport, Sophie gives Ian a heartfelt romantic speech before he leaves, and Sophie decides to walk the bridge with her friends. Future Sophie reveals that was the night she met the love of her life. The newly formed gang decides to have drinks at Jesse and Sid's place, revealed to be Ted and Marshall's old place.: Note: This episode was dedicated to Bob Saget.
2	2	"FOMO"	Pamela Fryman	Isaac Aptaker & Elizabeth Berger	January 18, 2022	1HME02
While Sophie struggles with Ian's departure, Valentina feels smothered by Charlie's constant presence. She invites the others to a brand new club named FOMO in an effort for them to befriend Charlie. Jesse has a crush on Sophie, but she is distracted by Ian's messages. Valentina breaks up with Charlie but regrets her harsh words. She apologizes to Charlie, who realizes they should start their relationship fresh and that he needs to get his own place. Sophie and Jesse agree to remain friends, as neither is ready for a relationship.
3	3	"The Fixer"	Kimberly McCullough	Dan Levy	January 25, 2022	1HME03
Sophie visits Jesse's workplace to help him with a dating profile, inspiring them to be each other's wingmen. Although Jesse successfully talks to a girl, Sophie forces her to leave after realizing she was after his viral breakup video fame. Sophie tells Jesse she was always the fixer to her mom's failed relationships. Jesse tells Sophie that Drew, his vice principal, is hoping to get her number. Sophie accepts a date from Drew. Meanwhile, Charlie has begun searching for his own apartment. Ellen turns down his offer to be roommates, but after battling over an apartment, they bond and decide to move in together. Sid and Hannah try desperately to keep the romance going from opposite sides of the country.
4	4	"Dirrty Thirty"	Pamela Fryman	Amelie Gillette	February 1, 2022	1HME04
Sophie and Drew go on a date, where they connect, and she invites him to her 30th birthday party. Conscious of his maturity, she changes the theme of the party from Christina Aguilera's "Dirrty" music video to "cocktail party" to try to impress him. When Sophie admits to Drew how jealous she is of his maturity, he assures her she does not need to change for him and admits he sometimes feels like he missed out on being young and crazy. Jesse and Ellen try to make up for lost time as siblings but find they do not know each other anymore. Jesse apologizes for missing out on being her big brother and vows to make it up to her. Unsure whether she is ready for commitment, Valentina allows Charlie to flirt with other women, but when she gets turned on by this, they decide they are ready for commitment. Sid wears a "man-gagement" ring to show his devotion, but it gets mixed results from the party guests.
5	5	"The Good Mom"	Morenike Joela Evans	Christopher Encell	February 8, 2022	1HME05
Sophie's mother, Lori, comes to town and invites Sophie to see her new musician boyfriend, Ash. Sophie accepts, backing out of a game night with Drew and his friends. Sophie is cautiously optimistic when she finds nothing wrong with Ash, but Valentina sees Lori kissing Ash's manager. Sophie confronts her mother, who reveals she always got bored and her boyfriends were not the problem. Sophie leaves to meet with Drew. Meanwhile, Ellen meets Rachel, the granddaughter of a deceased neighbor, and lies that she knew her. Rachel storms out upon learning the truth. Charlie decides to help people confront their problems and tries to help Jesse and Sid overcome their traumas. Although he succeeds, he is dismayed to find out how long he has to study to become a licensed therapist, so Sid hires him as a bartender instead.
6	6	"Stacey"	Phill Lewis	Donald Diego	February 15, 2022	1HME06
Sid and Hannah invite Drew and Sophie on a weekend getaway. Sid reveals he dropped out of medical school to buy and operate the bar without consulting Hannah. Drew finds out about Sophie Internet-stalking his ex, Stacey. Sid and Sophie talk about their mistakes: Sid wanted to do something for himself for once, while Sophie has never been in a real relationship. Sid promises to include Hannah in all future decisions, while Drew and Sophie apologize to each other, and he reveals that his relationship with Stacey was only perfect online. The rest of the gang attends Charlie and Ellen's first dinner party. Ellen tries to hide that she has slept with Jesse's date, Mia. However, when Mia admits it, Jesse reveals he is tired of being single and does not care. Charlie reveals he has followed several women across the ocean before Valentina, but he explains that this time is different because he loves her, and she reciprocates.
7	7	"Rivka Rebel"	Kelly Park	Karen Joseph Adcock & Ria Sardana	February 22, 2022	1HME08
Sophie is forced to photograph the bat mitzvah of influencing teen Rivka. She brings Valentina as her assistant, but Rivka refuses to pose for any photos. When she and her friends steal fake drugs from Valentina's purse, Sophie and Valentina pretend they are real to get her to pose. The photos impress Rivka's mother, who offers to look at Sophie's best photo. Meanwhile, Jesse and Sid lock themselves in their apartment to work but procrastinate. Sid reveals he is having trouble planning his wedding because his family is in India, while Jesse laments his lack of songwriting inspiration after Meredith left him. Charlie receives a bad Yelp review and finds out it was Ellen who admits her jealousy of his love life and success. He writes a good review of her, and she deletes her review.
8	8	"The Perfect Shot"	Lynda Tarryk	Jeremy Roth	March 1, 2022	1HME07
Drew invites the gang to a school auction. Valentina, verbally abused by her boss, steals a Chanel purse, but he notices it missing, so Charlie steals it back. When Sophie breaks her tooth, Jesse brings her to a cheap dentist, where she meets many long-unsuccessful artists. She breaks her tooth again when Jesse's car breaks down. Jesse tells her how much he likes her photos, and she gets her perfect shot of him working on the car. Drew reveals he offered Jesse a full-time music teacher job because he believes Jesse's music career is a pipe dream. She asks if he believes in her photography, and he admits she needs a stable job. Sophie confides in Jesse about her fight with Drew, and they kiss. Meanwhile, Meredith arrives at the apartment to talk to Jesse, eventually revealing to Ellen and Sid that she wrote a new single about Jesse.
9	9	"Jay Street"	Pamela Fryman	Ama Quao & Ally Thibault	March 8, 2022	1HME09
The Captain is shown to have cheated on his wife, Becky. Jesse confronts Meredith, who explains she needs to figure out herself, but she regrets breaking up and wants him to play piano on her tour. Sophie goes to Drew's apartment to break up with him but is delayed by his parents, who have been implicated in a Ponzi scheme. She tells him he deserves to be with someone who is sure about him. The gallery owner calls to tell her the show will use her photograph. In 2050, Sophie's "perfect shot" is shown hanging on her wall. At the bar, Charlie attempts to get the gang to watch soccer with him to no avail. Hannah reveals to Sid that she was offered a year-long fellowship in California after her residency, while Ellen frets over her outfit choices for an upcoming job interview. Charlie admits he is homesick, so Valentina decorates Charlie's apartment with British paraphernalia.
10	10	"Timing Is Everything"	Pamela Fryman	Isaac Aptaker & Elizabeth Berger	March 15, 2022	1HME10
After their first date, Sophie overhears Jesse saying "I love you" in his sleep after sex. When she confronts him, he reveals he rejected Meredith's offer to go on her tour because he does love her. Sophie tells him not to give up his dream for her as their relationship is new, angering him. She goes to MacLaren's, the bar downstairs, and meets Robin Scherbatsky, who encourages her not to make her decisions out of fear. However, Sophie sees Jesse kissing Meredith, and Robin tells her that "timing is everything." Meanwhile, Sid encourages Hannah to take the fellowship, and they elope. After her bad job interview, Ellen takes care of an unfriendly cat she finds in the streets. She runs into Rachel, her new neighbor and the cat's owner, who agrees to give Ellen a second chance; she also gets the job. When Valentina mentions she wants children, Charlie reveals he does not, as he does not want to be a bad parent like his mother, and they break up. Charlie, Ellen, Valentina, Sid, and Hannah arrive at the art show to support Sophie. Because Becky demanded the Captain's boats in their divorce, Ian loses his job in Australia and arrives at the show to talk to Sophie.

=== Season 2 (2023) ===
No. overall	No. in season	Title	Directed by	Written by	Original release date	Prod. code
11	1	"Cool and Chill"	Pamela Fryman	Isaac Aptaker & Elizabeth Berger	January 24, 2023	2HME01
At the art show, Sophie tells Ian she has nothing going on in her love life. Jesse arrives late to congratulate Sid and Hannah, and the group, including Ian, goes back to Sid's bar to create a wedding reception for them. Jesse tells Ellen and Sid about the month-long tour he is going on with Meredith, and confides that he does not know what to do about his feelings for Sophie. When trying to create a photo montage and talking about being friends, Charlie and Valentina have sex but do not get back together. The two only discover while showing the montage that they accidentally recorded themselves having sex over it, humiliating them both. Seeing Sid despondent at the ruined night, Sophie cheers him up by having everyone do the Electric Slide. She also fails to keep Ian from finding out about Jesse and Drew, but Ian admits that he has been through a lot and still wants to date her. However, Sophie tells him that she is not ready for a relationship until she knows why she is acting irrationally. A flashforward shows her calling her mother while driving, saying she may be dating her father when she crashes into another car which is revealed to be driven by Barney Stinson.
12	2	"Midwife Crisis"	Pamela Fryman	Daniel Libman & Matthew Libman	January 31, 2023	2HME03
Feeling insecure, Sophie lies to Meredith about having sold her photo and being able to do a home birth for her pregnant neighbor. When her neighbor goes into labor, she and Valentina are forced to deliver the baby, which helps regain her confidence, which increases when she learns her photo has sold. Sid holds several grudges against Meredith, upsetting Jesse, so they air their grievances. Sid is about to reveal something further about his strongest grudge only for Meredith to have Sid pretend to forgive her in order to keep Jesse happy. Later, he recalls his final grudge - that Meredith does not love Jesse. Ellen has not heard back from Rachel, so she and Charlie host a building party to get her attention. Rachel admits to Ellen that she is just as messed up as her, and they agree to go out.
13	3	"The Reset Button"	Pamela Fryman	Donald Diego	February 7, 2023	2HME02
The man who bought Sophie's photo invites her and Jesse to his apartment. They find he is a Men's Rights Activist, and he and his wife also hit on Jesse the entire time. A horrified Sophie and Jesse take the photo back and mend their friendship, and Sophie gives Jesse her blessing to date Meredith. However, when Jesse answers a call from Meredith, Sophie steps aside and sets the photo on top of a taxi, which drives away with it. Charlie, trying to rebound from his breakup with Valentina, goes on a double date with Sid and Hannah, who try to take advantage of his flight attendant date's airline miles so they can see each other during Hannah's fellowship. Sid and Hannah later apologize to Charlie, giving him an outfit to go on a first date when he is ready. Meanwhile, Valentina goes on a double date with Ellen and Rachel, and gets into an argument with Rachel, which Ellen tries to break up, only for the conversation to focus on her, leading them to realize she has issues with conflict. She agrees to see a therapist. Afterward, Valentina tells Sophie that she believes she and Charlie will one day get back together, while Charlie, empowered, meets another woman who looks like her.
14	4	"Pathetic Deirdre"	Pamela Fryman	Amelie Gillette	February 14, 2023	2HME04
Jealous of Ellen's success after moving to New York, Sophie and Valentina track down "Pathetic Deirdre", their college friend with a horrible life who they hung out with to make themselves feel better. They find she has published a self-help book portraying them as two "toxic women". Deirdre claims she used them to make herself feel better, but they clarify what really happened, and end up outing Deirdre as still toxic, causing her fans to turn on her. Jesse and Meredith promote her new tour, but when Meredith makes it all about her, lying about her and Jesse's reunion, Sid tells Jesse that Meredith does not love him. Jesse leaves for the tour, telling Sid he does not want him there if he will not support him. After hooking up with the woman, Courtney, Charlie sends her a gift basket, causing her to think he wants a relationship with her, despite him planning to hook up with other women. They plan for a second date, but Courtney leaves upon learning the truth. Ellen suffers a horrible first day at her new job, having to climb the stairs, getting locked in a closet, and crashing through the ceiling into a meeting.
15	5	"Ride or Die"	Pamela Fryman	Owen Ellickson	February 21, 2023	2HME06
Jesse remains troubled by Sid's admission that Meredith does not love him, especially as she drags him to several promotional appearances. When Jesse sees that the video of Meredith's song includes footage from his failed proposal, he confronts Meredith, who refuses to remove it. Charlie, hoping to mend Sid's and Jesse's friendship, sends Sid cookies on Jesse's behalf, only for them to trigger Sid's walnut allergy, which he nearly dies from as Charlie has disposed of his epi- pen, mistaking it for a vape. Realizing how important Jesse's friendship is to him, Sid soon rushes to the concert only to find that Jesse has broken up with Meredith again, and the two apologize to each other and make up. Meanwhile, Valentina's parents set Sophie up with a successful man named Oscar after Valentina rejected their attempts to set her up. After they admit they do not think Charlie is real, Valentina tries to prove herself by stealing Oscar from Sophie, only for the three to realize that Valentina's parents set them up to annoy her, and stage a fake fight in order to get Valentina's parents to back off. Oscar then asks Sophie on a real date, and Valentina's parents apologize to her for not trusting her independence.
16	6	"Universal Therapy"	Michael Shea	Christopher Encell	February 28, 2023	2HME05
Sophie becomes uncomfortable with Oscar's large necklace, which contains his deceased mother's ashes. After having Ellen talk to her therapist to determine this may eventually pass, they consummate their relationship. When Sophie tells Oscar he does not need the necklace to remember his mother, he takes it off and they have sex again, and she realizes he is not good at it without the necklace. When she asks him to wear it again, he breaks up with her, alarmed at her sexual expectations. An unemployed Jesse gets a job as Valentina's assistant, where she treats him the same demeaning way her boss treats her. When he calls her out, they both ask Ellen to tell her therapist about them. Ellen's therapist drops her as a client due to her friends' various issues, so her friends force her to take Ellen back. Valentina stands up to her boss, which gets her promoted, and Jesse resumes his job as a music teacher. Meanwhile, Charlie buys several cases of foul wine. He and Sid try to sell it by claiming Judge Judy endorsed it, which causes Judy to show up herself and take the wine after learning the customers do not care how it tastes.
17	7	"A Terrible, Horrible, No Good, Very Bad Valentine's Day"	Pamela Fryman	Amy-Jo Perry	March 7, 2023	2HME07
With Ellen unable to spend Valentine's Day with Rachel, the gang gathers at Sid's bar to tell stories of their worst Valentine's Day. Sophie and Valentina reveal they met in college when dating the same guy. Sid becomes upset when Hannah's flight from California is delayed, and tells them about their worst Valentine's Day, where in med school he and Hannah had begun dating and Hannah danced with Drew to make him jealous, causing him and Hannah to become an official couple the next morning. After Hannah arrives, Charlie admits he tried to surprise his girlfriend, but she stood him up. Rachel sends Ellen food and they have dinner together through FaceTime. Sophie becomes angered after learning that Jesse has told several women he loved them too soon, as him telling her made her feel special. Jesse apologizes to Sophie, telling her after Meredith he did not think he would fall in love again, and Sophie admits she once tried to get in contact with her father as a child. A flashforward shows her having dinner with Ian on another Valentine's Day. This episode uses archive footage of Hilary Duff from Lizzie McGuire to depict a thirteen year old Sophie.
18	8	"Rewardishment"	Phill Lewis	Jeremy Roth	March 14, 2023	2HME08
The group use Jesse and Sid's system of "rewardishment" to accomplish goals they struggle with, needing to accomplish them before a deadline. Sophie and Valentina attempt to get driver's licenses, but nearsighted Valentina refuses to wear glasses or contacts. Sophie's instructor has a heart attack, forcing Sophie to drive to the hospital, failing the test. Ellen struggles to confront her coworker Rhonda, and asks Jesse, trying to do a hula hoop routine, for help. Rhonda's pet snake escapes and bites Jesse. Ellen takes him to the hospital after lecturing Rhonda for mocking him. Charlie cuts himself trying to shave. Sid, trying to chug a beer, takes him to the hospital. Charlie manages to shave after shaving a man for surgery, and later spikes Sid's champagne with a chili pepper, forcing Sid to chug a beer to cool his tongue, then accidentally blinds Valentina with the hand he squeezed the pepper with. After her eye is treated, Valentina wears contacts. Jesse teaches Sophie to drive, and confesses he could not do the routine because his family did not support him, and that he is dating again. Sophie tells Jesse the group is his family, and he does the routine - after the deadline.
19	9	"The Welcome Protocol"	Phill Lewis	Ria Sardana	March 21, 2023	2HME09
Jesse invites a date, Dana, to meet the group, forcing the others to do the "welcome protocol" to all take on certain roles in the group to make her feel welcome. They all like her, but Jesse feels no spark, so they try to get rid of her. They fake a car accident involving Jesse's mother, only for a woman to arrive and tell Dana her grandmother was in an accident. Jesse accuses her of faking it, and after a disgusted Dana leaves, he admits to Ellen that he tried to rush things with Dana because he is not yet over Sophie. Ellen encourages him to pursue Sophie. Meanwhile, Valentina, after designing a dress for famous singer and actress Daphne Dupree, brings Sophie as her plus-one to the premiere party of Daphne's musical. When they arrive, Sophie sees how different the upper class live when she meets the chef, Robert, while they notice other women wearing the same dress as Daphne. They try to stop her from finding out, but fail, forcing Valentina to promise to save Daphne's reputation in exchange for her not destroying Valentina's career, which she does by having her compliment the other women with the same dress. In the pantry, Sophie bonds with Robert, who asks her out.
20	10	"I'm His Swish"	Anthony Rich	M. Dickson	March 28, 2023	2HME11
With Sophie's relationship with Robert going well, Valentina also looks into dating people not her age, and brings a college freshman, Swish, back to the apartment while Sophie and Robert have a night in, but they end up insulting each other's dates. Valentina admits Swish is amazed when she does anything remotely adult, causing Sophie to think that is why Robert is dating her. She tries to confirm this by making plans for a month later, and he reveals he feels his age and did not want her to think he was old. They agree to have a weekend away in a week. Swish, having overheard Valentina say she loves him, proposes to her. She accepts, thinking he will forget. Jesse is upset over Sophie, so Ellen tries to comfort him, but Rachel returns from Florida. After finding them having sex on his bed, Jesse brings them out to help him find a woman to have sex with. Charlie and Sid, noticing Robert looks young for his age, visit a spa, but get injections and chemical peels, freaking Jesse and his date out. Jesse and his date attempt to have sex, but she leaves after finding a bra in his bed.
21	11	"Daddy"	Pamela Fryman	Isaac Aptaker & Elizabeth Berger	March 28, 2023	2HME10
The group takes an item each from the bar's lost and found. Valentina retrieves a book, which Jesse lost and demands back. She discovers a receipt in the book, on which Jesse wrote a love song for Sophie. Jesse admits he has feelings for Sophie but does not want to screw things up again. Valentina agrees to keep the secret. While visiting Hannah, Sid meets a woman, Taylor, and they bond. Sophie and Robert travel to his upstate house for a romantic weekend. After Robert recalls hearing a song at Lollapalooza in 1991, Sophie sees a photo of Robert and Lori together there that year. Thinking he may be her father, she takes a photo of it and drives away, but crashes into Barney Stinson's car. Seeing her distress, he offers to cover the damages if she tells him her problem. Sophie worries her behavior stems from her father leaving Lori. Barney expresses gratitude for meeting his father, but cautions Sophie that doing so may not entirely resolve her issues. Lori texts Sophie that Robert is not her father. Robert admits he and Lori dated but did not have sex, but the couple still break up. Sophie decides to find her father.
22	12	"Not a Mamma Mia"	Pamela Fryman	Donald Diego	May 23, 2023	2HME12
After asking her mother about how she was conceived, Sophie and Valentina find three men who could possibly be her father. Quickly ruling out the first man as Asian; Sophie, Valentina, Jesse and Sid travel to Staten Island to find the second man. They see him laying flowers at his father's grave, and follow him. They find he is a cool man, but Sophie is unable to speak to him. Meanwhile, Charlie and Ellen investigate the third candidate, a former stripper, and try to get him to take his shirt off by hiring him for a bachelorette party, which he struggles with. Throughout the episode, Sid texts Taylor, the woman he met on the plane, making Jesse jealous. When Jesse confronts Sid about this and questions whether Sid has a crush on Taylor, Sid tells Taylor they should not talk anymore. Sophie meets her friends at the bar, and tells them she could not talk to the man she was following. They reassure her, telling her she just might not have been ready, only for the man, Nick, to show up at the bar to speak to her.
23	13	"Family Business"	Pamela Fryman	Amelie Gillette	May 30, 2023	2HME13
Sophie talks with Nick who reveals she muttered to herself that he could be her father at the camera outside the restaurant. Attempting to bond with Nick, Sophie has Sid host a hotdog pop-up at the bar. After Nick admits he has to close his hot-dog stand, Sophie encourages him to sell hot dogs at the bar, and they bond over their love of storytelling. Meanwhile, Valentina believes Swish is cheating on her. When Ellen and Valentina go to an open house, Valentina loses her engagement ring, causing her to freak out. She returns and retrieves it from the home owner, but is embarrassed when Swish surprises her with an engagement party. Charlie and Jesse participate in a bar crawl, and Jesse becomes jealous at Charlie's ability to pick up women with his accent. As an experiment, Charlie and Jesse switch accents, and take two women, Julia and Angelina, back to Jesse and Sid's apartment; but as they struggle to maintain the fake accent and the truth is revealed, Julia and Angelina admit to searching for a British man for Angelina's bachelorette party. However, Julia and Charlie find they like each other, and decide to go on another date.
24	14	"Disengagement Party"	Pamela Fryman	Owen Ellickson	June 6, 2023	2HME14
In an effort to end Valentina's engagement, Sophie asks the group and Valentina's parents to talk Swish into breaking up with her. At the same time, Ellen and Charlie fight after Charlie confuses Ellen with Julia while she sleeps over at their apartment. To fix their relationship, Jesse tells Ellen and Charlie about a book that helps them reconcile but causes Julia to leave Charlie. Meanwhile, Sid becomes upset when Hannah begins looking at houses in Los Angeles, as he is reluctant to move away from New York. When Sid asks Valentina's parents for advice, they advise him on having to make sacrifices in a marriage. Sid reconciles with Hannah, showing her a video of their engagement night, and agrees to move to Los Angeles with her. Sophie then sees Valentina and Charlie in love on the video and shows it to Valentina, causing her to finally break up with Swish.
25	15	"Working Girls"	Pamela Fryman	Daniel Libman & Matthew Libman	June 13, 2023	2HME15
Sophie learns of a job opening to become a food photographer for a cabbage campaign at Ellen's workplace, and asks Ellen for a recommendation. Sophie gets the job, but is appalled to learn Ellen did not recommend her. Ellen initially says she forgot, but admits she did not send it because she was unsure if Sophie could manage a full-time job, causing an argument that jeopardizes the campaign. Feeling bad for risking Ellen's career, Sophie tries to resign in order for Ellen to keep her job, but when Ellen defends her, they are both allowed to continue the campaign, which is successful. Meanwhile, Jesse ridicules Valentina and Charlie for seeking advice from a psychic, so they convince him to see her. She tells Jesse he will die at the end of the night. This worries Charlie and Valentina, who try to help Jesse complete his bucket list, but Jesse survives the night. Sid visits Hannah and attempts to connect with her new life by bonding with her co-workers at a party, only to fail miserably. After Sid injures himself in the rain and is temporarily paralyzed from the waist down, Hannah tells him she will return to New York after her fellowship ends.
26	16	"The Jersey Connection"	Michael Shea	Christopher Encell	June 20, 2023	2HME16
At the bar, the group, including Rachel, notices a few of Jesse's coworkers hanging out without him, and find they all hate him. Jesse and Rachel leave, evasive about where they are going. Suspicious, Ellen, Sid and Sophie follow Rachel to New Jersey, but Sophie splits off when they see Jesse, following him to a bar where she sees him singing song parodies about his coworkers. She confronts him, and they return to the bar, where Jesse apologizes and lets his coworkers air their grievances with him. Afterwards, they let him join them, and Sophie leaves as Jesse begins a conversation with a new teacher. Sid and Ellen find Rachel wants a new apartment, overhearing her say she needs space from Ellen. After seeing them, Rachel tells Ellen that dating her and living near her is overbearing, and they break up. Charlie and Valentina go to a restaurant for a date they booked when they were dating, but leave because it is too romantic. As they leave, Charlie comforts the owner, a crying child, but tells Valentina that he still does not want kids. Realizing that his reasons are the same reasons she does want kids, they agree to just stay friends.
27	17	"Out of Sync"	Gloria Calderón Kellett	Amy-Jo Perry	June 27, 2023	2HME17
Sophie makes the gang have a phone-free day. She and Valentina run into Lance Bass and Joey Fatone of NSYNC, who invite them to a party. Not knowing the location, they try to retrieve their phones to look it up. Sid tells them where the location is when they mention it, and all three go. They see two different men who look like the musicians, and assume they were excited and did not realize. Sophie encounters Ian, with a new girlfriend, and tells Valentina she feels everyone she dated is moving on while she is not, and wanted to forget. Charlie distracts Ellen from Rachel with a spa day, but Ellen puts him in sensory deprivation and escapes, breaking the gas line doing so. She fails to retrieve her phone, and returns, notices what happened, and carries Charlie out of the building, realizing she does not need Rachel. Jesse dates Parker, the new teacher, and tries to impress her, but realizes he forgot his credit card, so he runs back to the apartment to get it, but fails. He apologizes to Parker. After getting their phones back, Sophie finds a video posted by the musicians, who missed her and Valentina at the party.
28	18	"Parent Trap"	Pamela Fryman	Jillian Dukes & Ally Thibault and Austin S. Harris	July 4, 2023	2HME18
Sophie and Valentina attempt to set Sophie's parents Lori and Nick up by inviting them to dinner, only to see the two making out. The two admit they got back together weeks ago but wanted to take things slow to rebuild their trust. Meanwhile, Ellen wants to live by herself, while Sid wants to live alone with Hannah, so they attempt to convince Charlie and Jesse to move in together by setting up a sleepover, only for Charlie and Jesse to confront them for pushing them away. When Jesse hides in his room, an upset Sophie shows up to complain about being excluded from her parents' life, also hiding in Jesse's room when they arrive. Jesse comforts her, saying this all makes them a real family. She then sees that he tried to impress her during their brief romance and leaves to apologize to her parents, after which Jesse and Sid, and Ellen and Charlie make up. Sophie later gets a text about a game night, but decides not to go upon seeing Parker there.
29	19	"Shady Parker"	Pamela Fryman	Jeremy Roth	July 11, 2023	2HME19
Jesse decides to move in with Parker and has the others come over to help him pack. Realizing Sophie still has feelings for Jesse, Valentina tries to find the song he wrote for her only to discover it missing. Helping Jesse move, Sophie and Sid discover Parker has a credit card and medication with different names and, after inviting Drew, find the school she last worked at does not remember her, while Valentina discovers Ellen and Charlie took something, only to find Ellen gave herself a bad haircut and has worn a wig for some time. When they confront Parker, she explains the pills and card belong to her mother and brother, causing them to apologize before she leaves, though Jesse is upset with them for invading his privacy.
30	20	"Okay Fine, It's a Hurricane"	Pamela Fryman	Isaac Aptaker & Elizabeth Berger & Ally Wyatt	July 11, 2023	2HME20
Following the power outage at the apartment, the gang goes to the bar, where the power is also out. Hannah arrives early to surprise Sid, but Ellen discovers she kissed another man in Los Angeles. Valentina, finding Charlie is afraid of storms, comforts him. Drew attempts to hit on Sophie. However, he realizes she is still into Jesse, apologizes, and admits he found the song Jesse wrote for her, giving it to her. When she confronts Jesse, they argue over their relationship, and he leaves for Parker's apartment. When Hannah admits her indiscretion, Sid forgives her, remembering Taylor, but questions whether it only happened once. Charlie, over his fear, tells Valentina even though they want different things, he would not change anything about their relationship. Inspired, Valentina confronts Sophie about her feelings for Jesse, causing her to pursue him, while Valentina finds Drew. Sophie encounters Jesse returning from Parker's apartment admitting he still has feelings for her, and they kiss before returning to the bar. Upon arriving, they find Sid upset and try to comfort him, while Valentina and Drew hook up. In the present, Sophie reveals to her son that Charlie and Valentina eventually had their own son, Alex.

== Production ==
=== Development ===
Following the production of the 2014 CBS pilot How I Met Your Dad, which did not move forward, on December 14, 2016, it was reported that Isaac Aptaker and Elizabeth Berger were set to write a new version of the previous spin-off's pilot, re-titled How I Met Your Father, with Carter Bays and Craig Thomas serving as executive producers. It was later announced that, after signing new contracts with 20th Century Fox Television that would see both Aptaker and Berger being promoted to executive producers and co-showrunners on This Is Us alongside Dan Fogelman, the idea would be put on hold until further notice.

On August 8, 2017, Fox chairman Dana Walden told Deadline Hollywood that 20th Television was attempting a spin-off with different writers, for the third time. Three days following the announcement, Deadline reported that Alison Bennett would write the spin-off, with the same title as the previous attempt with Aptaker and Berger. It was also learned that Bays and Thomas were once again hired as executive producers. This attempt also fell through.

On April 21, 2021, the spin-off series titled How I Met Your Father was given a 10-episode series order by Hulu. On June 24, 2021, Pamela Fryman joined the series as an executive producer and to direct the pilot. On February 15, 2022, Hulu renewed the series for a 20-episode second season. On September 1, 2023, the series was canceled after two seasons.

=== Casting ===
Upon series order announcement, Hilary Duff was cast to star. On June 16, 2021, Chris Lowell joined the cast as the male lead. In August 2021, Francia Raisa, Tom Ainsley, Tien Tran, and Suraj Sharma were cast in starring roles while Brandon Micheal Hall was cast in a recurring role. However, a few weeks later, Hall exited the role due to a scheduling conflict and Daniel Augustin was cast to replace Hall. The next day, Josh Peck and Ashley Reyes joined the cast in recurring roles. On November 5, 2021, Kim Cattrall was cast in a recurring role as the future version of Duff's character Sophie. Upon the series premiere, it was reported that Leighton Meester is set to recur. On February 3, 2022, it was announced that Paget Brewster was cast to guest star on the episode,"The Good Mom", which aired on February 8, 2022. On January 18, 2023, Meaghan Rath was cast in a recurring capacity for the second season.

=== Filming ===
Principal photography for the series began on August 31, 2021.

== Release ==
How I Met Your Father premiered on Hulu on January 18, 2022. Internationally, the show began streaming on Disney+ via Star and in Latin America on Star+ on March 9, 2022. The second season premiered on January 24, 2023, on Hulu. Internationally, the second season arrived on April 19, 2023, on Disney+. The entire series is also available on Disney+ in the United States via the Hulu tab since December 6, 2023.

== Reception ==
=== Viewership ===
==== Season 1 ====
According to Parrot Analytics, which looks at consumer engagement in consumer research, streaming, downloads, and on social media, How I Met Your Father was the fifth most in-demand new show during the week of March 12, 2022, to March 18, 2022. Whip Media's app TV Time, which tracks viewership data for the more than 19 million worldwide users of its app, reported that How I Met Your Father was the fifth-most streamed original series in the U.S. during the weeks of January 23 and January 30, 2022. It ranked eighth during the week of February 13, fourth during the week of March 13, and third during the week of March 20, 2022.

==== Season 2 ====
Whip Media's TV Time reported that How I Met Your Father was the most-streamed original series in the U.S. during the week of January 29 to February 5, 2023, and held the second position during the weeks of February 12, February 26 to March 5, and June 4, 2023. It was ranked third during the weeks of February 19, March 12, March 26, April 2, and May 28, and fourth during the week of March 19. Furthermore, How I Met Your Father was ranked as the twenty-sixth most-watched streaming original television series of 2023, according to Whip Media.

=== Critical response ===
For the first season, the review aggregator website Rotten Tomatoes reported a 36% approval rating, based on 47 critic reviews, with an average rating of 4.4/10. The website's critics consensus reads, "How I Met Your Father takes great pains to update its predecessor's formula for a modern audience, but this stilted retread only amounts to a painful slog." Metacritic, which uses a weighted average, assigned a score of 49 out of 100 based on 19 critics, indicating "mixed or average reviews".

The show's second season has a 33% approval rating on Rotten Tomatoes based on 6 critic reviews, with an average rating of 4.3/10.

=== Accolades ===
Year	Award	Category	Nominee(s)	Result	Ref(s)
2022	Primetime Creative Arts Emmy Awards	Outstanding Cinematography for A Multi-Camera Series	Gary Baum (for "Pilot")	Won	
2022	Primetime Creative Arts Emmy Awards	Outstanding Multi-Camera Picture Editing For A Comedy Series	Sue Federman (for "Timing is Everything")	Won	
2022	ReFrame Stamp	IMDbPro Top 200 Scripted TV Recipients	How I Met Your Father	Won	
2022	Set Decorators Society of America Awards	Best Achievement in Décor/Design of a Half-Hour Multi-Camera Series	Amy Feldman and Glenda Rovello	Won	
2023	American Cinema Editors Awards	Best Edited Multi-Camera Comedy Series	Sue Federman (for "Timing is Everything")	Nominated	
2023	Art Directors Guild Awards	Excellence in Production Design for a Multi-Camera Series	Glenda Rovello (for "Pilot")	Won	
2023	Nickelodeon Kids' Choice Awards	Favorite Female TV Star	Hilary Duff	Nominated	
2023	Set Decorators Society of America Awards	Best Achievement in Décor/Design of a Half-Hour Multi-Camera Series	Amy Feldman and Glenda Rovello	Nominated	
2023	Primetime Creative Arts Emmy Awards	Outstanding Cinematography for a Series (Half-Hour)	Gary Baum (for "Daddy")	Nominated	
2023	Primetime Creative Arts Emmy Awards	Outstanding Multi-Camera Picture Editing For A Comedy Series	Russell Griffin (for "Daddy")	Nominated	
2023	Primetime Creative Arts Emmy Awards	Outstanding Production Design for a Narrative Program (Half-Hour)	Amy Feldman, Conny Boettger-Marinos and Glenda Rovello (for "The Reset Button" and "Ride or Die")	Nominated	
2024	Primetime Creative Arts Emmy Awards	Outstanding Multi-Camera Picture Editing For A Comedy Series	Russell Griffin (for "Okay Fine, It's A Hurricane")	Won	
2024	Primetime Creative Arts Emmy Awards	Outstanding Cinematography for A Multi-Camera Series	Gary Baum (for "Okay Fine, It's A Hurricane")	Won	
