= Raze (film) =

- Theatrical release poster
- Directed by: Josh C. Waller
- Written by: Robert Beaucage
- Story by: Kenny Gage; Josh C. Waller; Robert Beaucage
- Produced by: Josh C. Waller; Kenny Gage; Andrew Pagana; Rachel Nichols; Zoë Bell
- Starring: Zoë Bell; Rachel Nichols; Tracie Thoms; Sherilyn Fenn; Doug Jones; Bruce Thomas; Rebecca Marshall; Adrienne Wilkinson; Allene Quincy; Bailey Anne Borders; Jordan James Smith
- Cinematography: Dylan O'Brien
- Edited by: Brett W. Bachman
- Music by: Frank Riggio
- Production companies: Cinipix; Quincy Pictures
- Distributed by: IFC Midnight; Cosmic Toast Studios
- Release dates: April 21, 2013 (Tribeca Film Festival); January 10, 2014 (United States)
- Running time: 87 minutes
- Country: United States
- Language: English

Raze is a 2013 action horror film that was directed by Josh C. Waller. The film premiered on April 21, 2013 at the Tribeca Film Festival and stars Zoë Bell, Rachel Nichols, Sherilyn Fenn and Doug Jones. The story focuses on women forced to fight to death for the twisted entertainment of the wealthy elite.

== Synopsis ==
Sabrina (Zoë Bell), along with 49 other women, is kidnapped by the diabolical husband and wife team of Elizabeth (Sherilyn Fenn) and Joseph (Doug Jones), and kept in a prison where they are all barefoot in matching white tank tops and gray sweatpants. The women are told that they will fight to the death for the entertainment of a group of bored rich people. If they lose or refuse to fight, a sniper will kill their loved ones.

== Cast ==
- Zoë Bell as Sabrina
- Rachel Nichols as Jamie
- Tracie Thoms as Teresa
- Bruce Thomas as Kurtz
- Bailey Anne Borders as Cody
- Rebecca Marshall as Phoebe
- Allene Quincy as Brenda
- Adrienne Wilkinson as Nancy
- Doug Jones as Joseph
- Sherilyn Fenn as Elizabeth
- Amy Johnston as Gloria
- Tara Macken as Dee
- Nicole Steinwedell as Isabelle
- Kelly Thiebaud as Vanessa
- Jordan James Smith as Adam
- Rosario Dawson as Rachel

== Production ==
While creating Raze, Waller tried to treat the film "as seriously as if it were men that were abducted and forced to fight each other." For him this meant avoiding stereotypes typically seen within the "largely exploitative subgenre of women-in-prison" such as nudity, as he felt that viewers would not see this in an all-male exploitation film. Waller also tried to avoid gratuitous gore. Raze was shot with a very tight schedule and the crew had only thirty days to film nineteen action sequences. Partway through filming, Rosario Dawson was brought onto the set for a cameo as she had previously worked together with Bell and Thoms on the 2007 film Death Proof. Bell was not made aware of Dawson's casting or arrival, as Waller wanted her appearance to come as a surprise.

== Reception ==
Critical reception for Raze has been mixed. The film holds a rating of 45% on Rotten Tomatoes, based on 31 reviews. On Metacritic it has a score of 41% based on reviews from 16 critics. Criticism for the film predominantly centered upon the familiarity of the film's plot, and Fearnet reviewer Scott Weinberg commented that " Raze is simply a gender-friendly twist on a very conventional tale, but it's still a rather fun way to spend 85 minutes if you're tired of the same old action." The Hollywood Reporter criticized the movie's screenplay, as they felt that it did not give actors Jones and Fenn enough to work with and also opined that the movie's "opening title card, which cites statistics about the number of women who go missing in any given year -- the co-opting of real-world suffering making it that much harder to go along with Waller's idea of it's-only-a-midnight-movie kicks." Twitch Film praised Bell's acting as one of the film's highlights, as they felt that it helped "lift Raze above similarly themed genre film endeavors." The New York Times opined that the film would not appeal to everyone but that "there is food for thought here about the subjugation and exploitation of women, the limits of psychological and physical endurance, and more."

=== Awards ===
- Grand Jury Prize for Best Supporting Actress at the Las Vegas International Film Festival (2013, won - Tracie Thoms)
