= Adimalathura =

- village
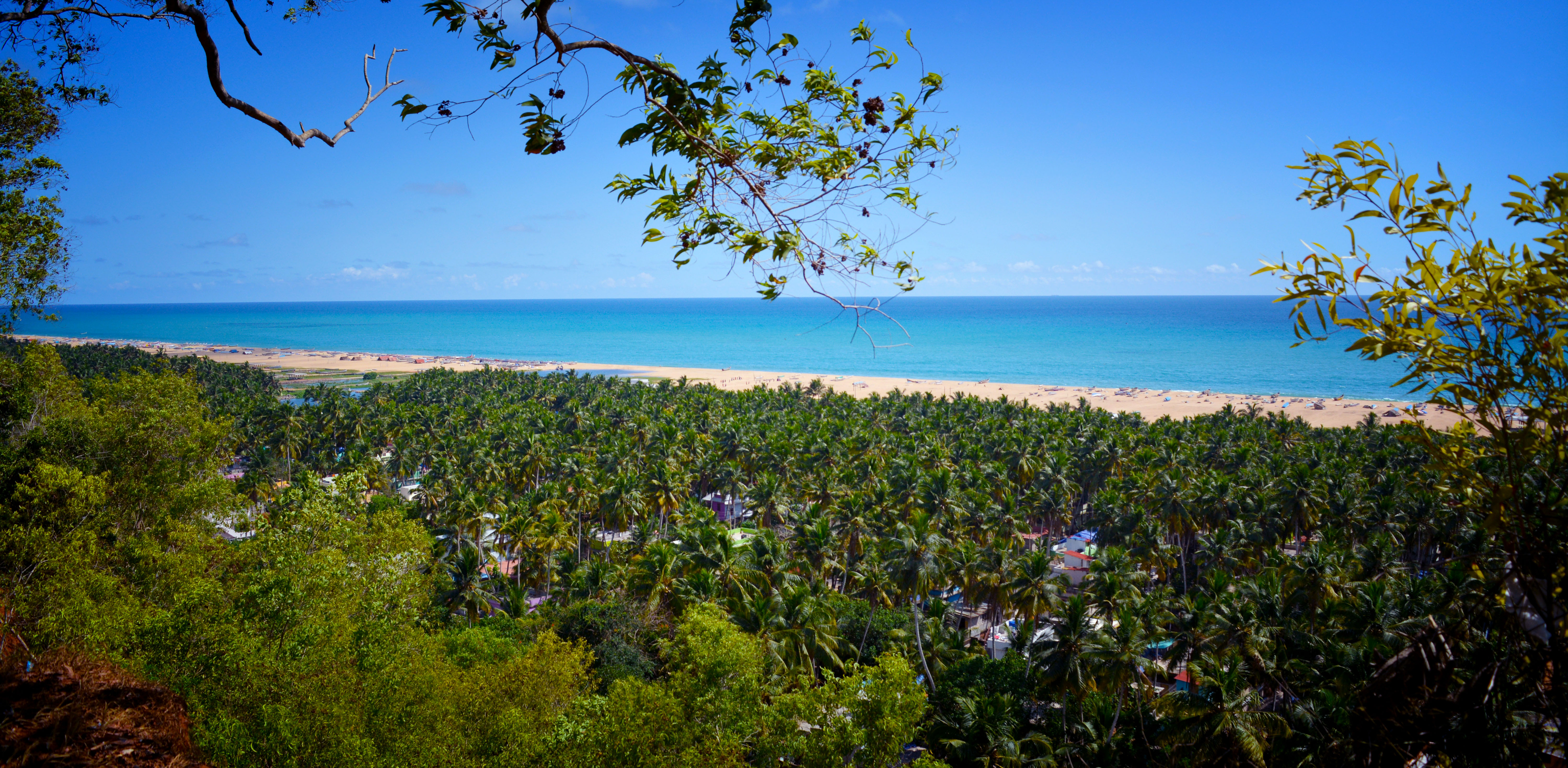
- Adimalathura beach

- Location in Kerala, India Adimalathura (India)
- Coordinates: 8.360975°N 77.017568°E
- Country: India
- State: Kerala
- District: Thiruvananthapuram

Government
  - Body: Gram panchayat

Area
  - Total: 2 km^{2} (0.77 sq mi)

Languages
  - Official: Malayalam, English
- Time zone: UTC+5:30 (IST)
- PIN: 695501
- Telephone code: 0471
- Vehicle registration: KL-20:
- Nearest city: Thiruvananthapuram
- Literacy: Malayalam 100%
- Lok Sabha constituency: Kovalam
- Climate: Tropical monsoon (Köppen)
- Avg. summer temperature: 35 °C (95 °F)
- Avg. winter temperature: 20 °C (68 °F)
- Website: adimalathura.com

Adimalathura is a village situated in the coastal belt of Thiruvananthapuram district in the state of Kerala, India.

== Etymology ==
The name Adimalathura may derive from the Malayalam word which encompasses the meaning of "A shore (sea shore) under the hill". The word adi means "under", and mala "Hill" and the last syllable thura means "shore (sea shore)".

The local language of Adimalathura is a combination of Tamil and Malayalam languages, widely spoken by the older generation.

== History ==
The name literally means '(coastal) village below the hill'. It was part of the neighbouring place called Pulluvila. Adimalathura is hardly 1 km in length and half km in width. It is bordered by the Karichal lake in the eastern side, the Chowara hills in the north, rocks vanishing into the Arabian sea in the south and west. It is under the green canopy formed by coconut palms.

It is a traditionally Latin Catholic village and perhaps the only village with nearly 100% Christians. This village has two churches and two Schools- the parish church names after Our Lady of Fatima and the church at the far end of the village in the western side named after Our Lay of immaculate Conception. The School is named Louis Memorial UPS and St.Joseph LPS. The people are highly religious and take pride in being called the children of Our Lady.

Traditionally people from this village belong to the fishing community, 99% of the population belong to the Christian church.

== Geography ==
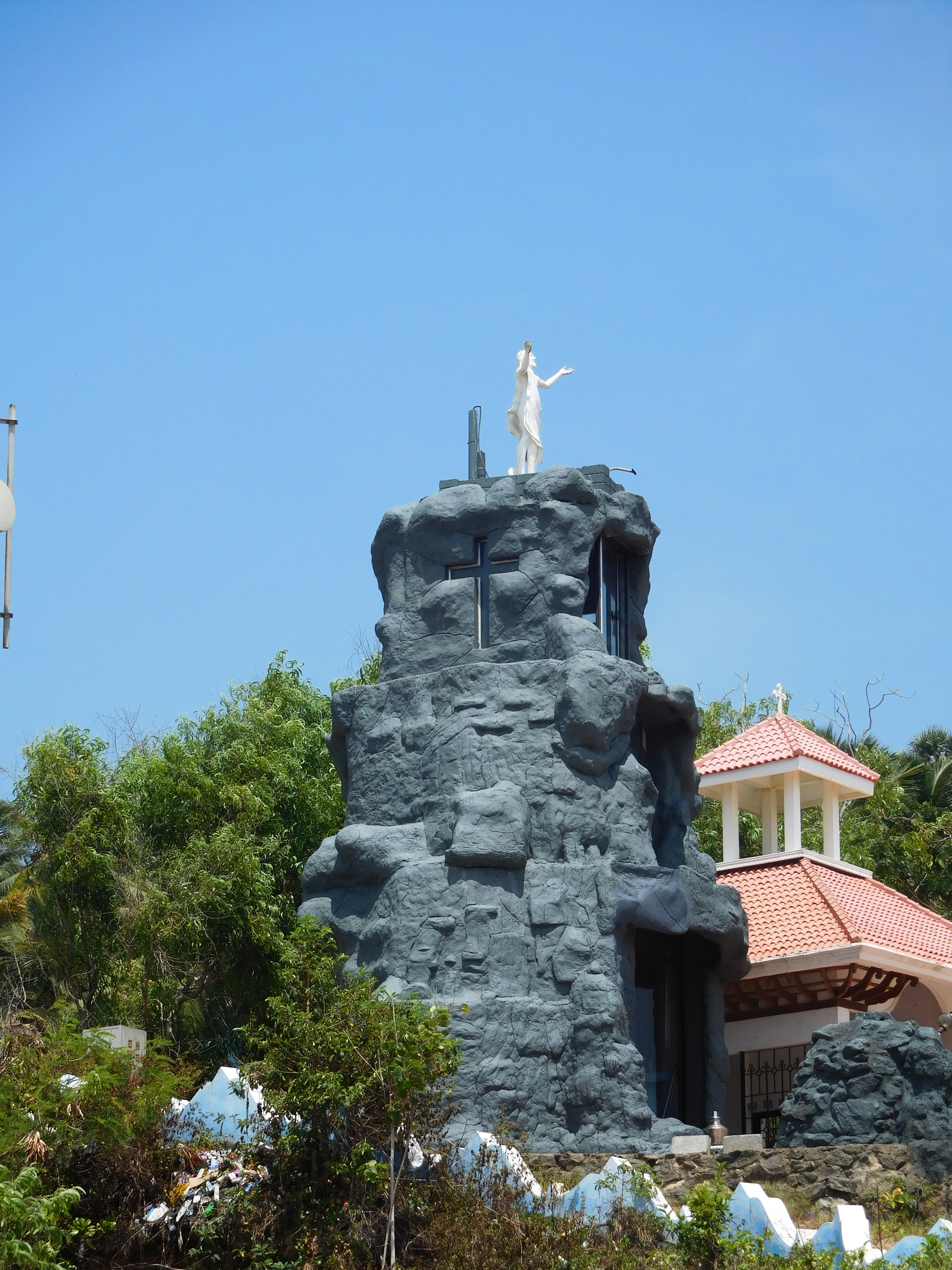
Adimalathura Catholic church

The location of this village is at the top of a vast undersea submarine mountain range in the Arabian Sea. The land of Adimalathura encompass a territory spread over roughly 2 kilometers. It features thousands of shelters of which more than 10,000 are inhabited. Traditionally it was where the ancient Travancore kingdom ruled.

Getting there:- Nearest Railway station: Thiruvananthapuram Central, around 23 km Nearest Airport: Thiruvananthapuram International Airport, around 22 km

== Climate ==
The temperature of this village ranges between 24 °C (75.2 °F) and 36 °C (96.8 °F) throughout the year. Although the humidity is relatively high, the constant cool sea breezes mitigate the heat.

The weather in Adimalathura is also affected by the large Coastal belt of Kerala and Tamil Nadu. The presence of this landmass causes differential heating of land and water. These factors set off a rush of moisture-rich air from the Arabian Sea over the Southern coastal region, resulting in tropical monsoons. Two seasons dominate this village: the dry season associated with the winter and the rainy season from the end of June to the end of August bringing strong winds. However, the weather patterns of this village do not always conform to the monsoon patterns of South Kerala.

== Heritage and resorts ==
This village has traditional resorts which highly function as ayurveda resorts and heritage sites. Somatheeram Ayurveda Resort (the world's first Ayurveda Beach resort), Manaltheeram Ayurveda Resort, Travancore Heritage and Abad Harmonia Ayurveda Resort can be found here.

== Schools ==
St. Joseph LP School & Louise memorial school Adimalathura (LMUPS). Rosa mystica HSS, Pulinkudi,
