= Rachel Nichols (actress) =

American actress and model (born 1979/1980)

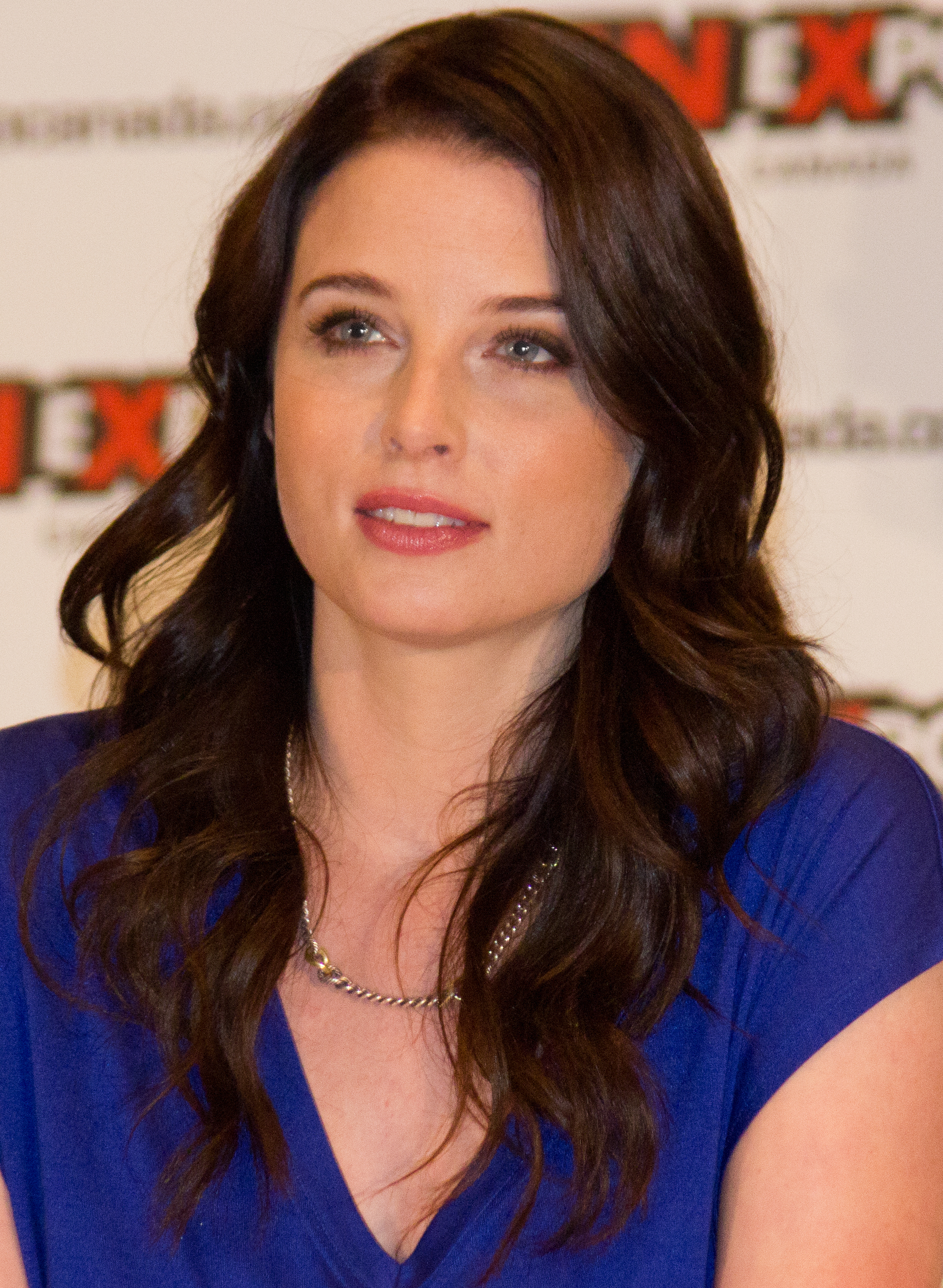
- Nichols in 2012
- Born: 1979/1980 (age 46–47); Augusta, Maine, U.S.
- Other name: Rachel Kershaw
- Education: Columbia University
- Occupations: Actress, model
- Years active: 2000–present
- Spouses: Scott Stuber (m. 2008; div. 2009); Michael Kershaw (m. 2014)

Rachel Nichols (born 1979 or 1980) is an American actress and model. Nichols began modeling while attending Columbia University in New York City in the late 1990s, and transitioned into acting by the early 2000s; she had a part in the romantic drama Autumn in New York (2000) and a one-episode role in the fourth season of Sex and the City (2002). Her first major role was in the comedy Dumb and Dumberer: When Harry Met Lloyd (2003), and she went on to achieve wider recognition playing Rachel Gibson in the final season of the action television series Alias (2005–2006) and for her role in the horror film The Amityville Horror (2005).

Nichols obtained her first starring film role in the thriller P2 (2007) and found mainstream success with the science-fiction action films Star Trek (2009) and G.I. Joe: The Rise of Cobra (2009). Her other notable films include The Sisterhood of the Traveling Pants 2 (2008), Conan the Barbarian (2011), Alex Cross (2012), Raze (2013), and Inside (2016). Nichols starred in the television series Continuum (2012–2015), and played notable roles in the sixth season of Criminal Minds (2010–2011), the fourth seasons of both Chicago Fire (2015–2016) and The Librarians (2017–2018), and five episodes as a Gestapo officer named Martha on The Man in the High Castle.

== Early life and modeling ==
Rachel Nichols was born in Augusta, Maine, to Jim, a schoolteacher, and Alison Nichols. She attended Cony High School, where she competed in the high jump. Nichols said in an interview that, when she was in high school, her mother would euphemistically refer to her as "a late bloomer", "which meant that I had uncontrollable arms and legs, I had very long appendages. It took several years of very highly structured dance classes for me to be able to control myself."

Upon graduating in 1998, she enrolled at Columbia University in New York City, aiming for a career as a Wall Street analyst. She was noticed by a modeling agent during lunch one day and was invited to work in Paris; she eventually paid her tuition with the proceeds from her modeling work. She worked on advertising campaigns for Abercrombie & Fitch, Guess, and L'Oréal; she also hosted several MTV specials. Nichols studied economics and psychology, as well as drama, graduating from Columbia in 2003 with a double major in mathematics and economics. Nichols said in September 2008 that "the modeling shoes have been hung up."

== Acting career ==
=== 2000–2004: Early acting credits ===
Nichols had done commercial work and had a bit part as a model in the romantic drama film Autumn in New York (2000) when her modeling agent helped her get a one-episode role in the fourth season of Sex and the City (2002). She later said she had "never really done a proper audition before", and added that "I had such fun [filming on set], that day actually made me want to pursue [acting] more seriously." Later that year she was cast in her first major film role as Jessica, a dogged student newspaper reporter, in Dumb and Dumberer: When Harry Met Lloyd (2003). Although the film was panned by critics, making it was a learning experience for Nichols. She said, "I was a sponge for the entire time I was in Atlanta [during filming] and freely admitted that I had no idea what was going on. I had never done a big film before, I had never been the lead in a film before and any advice anyone wanted to give me, I was more than willing to take." The following year, Nichols played a member of a high school debate team in the independent film Debating Robert Lee (2004) and had a two-episode role in the crime drama television series Line of Fire (2004), which was cancelled after 11 of 13 produced episodes were broadcast. By August 2004, she was cast in supporting roles in the horror films The Amityville Horror (2005) and The Woods (2006).

In late February 2004, Nichols was cast in a starring role in a then-untitled drama pilot for the Fox Broadcasting Company (Fox). According to Variety, her character was to be "a DEA agent who goes undercover at a high school". Todd and Glenn Kessler were developing the series, ultimately titled The Inside. The pilot they produced did not satisfy studio executives, however, and Tim Minear was brought in to create a new pilot for the series in late September 2004, replacing the Kesslers as executive producer and showrunner. The Inside was originally supposed to air midseason, but the new pilot itself was reshot and the series was pushed back. The new concept made Nichols' character a rookie FBI agent assigned to the FBI's Los Angeles Violent Crimes Unit. The series premiered in June 2005, and critical reception was mixed; it had been scheduled opposite the popular Dancing with the Stars on ABC, and due to low ratings, six of the 13 produced episodes were aired. It was not picked up for further episodes.

=== 2005–2009: Breakthrough ===
Following The Inside, Nichols found work on the fifth season of the serial action series Alias in 2005, being cast that July. Nichols starred as Rachel Gibson, a computer expert who thought she was working for the CIA when in fact she was working for a dangerous criminal organization—a situation similar to that of the series' main character Sydney Bristow (Jennifer Garner) in the first season. Discovering the truth, Gibson joins the real CIA and becomes Bristow's protégée. Of working on Alias, Nichols said that "to say it's the nicest set on the planet is an understatement". Her role involved multiple fight sequences, as did Garner's. Nichols worked with Garner's personal trainer; she said she "already knew that [Garner's] job was extremely hard. But I didn't know how difficult it was until I started training for just one fight." Nichols was being groomed to replace Garner as the main character due to the latter's pregnancy, which had been written into the storyline. But Alias was canceled in November 2005, making its fifth season its final. "I think everybody knew that the show wouldn't work without Jennifer", Nichols said, "But still, they were grooming me, so it was heartbreaking when it happened."

In 2005, Nichols played a brief role in the romantic drama Shopgirl and played a more notable role as a babysitter in The Amityville Horror. For the latter, she was nominated for the Teen Choice Award for Choice Movie Scream Scene and the MTV Movie Award for Best Frightened Performance. She later revealed that she almost did not audition for the film due to her fear of dogs. "[Producer] Michael Bay has these gigantic [dogs]. [...] And, when I went to audition for The Amityville Horror, I went into his offices and literally these three huge dogs were there, and I almost turned around. I was like, 'No, I'm not going to read for this film.' I actually used the dogs in my audition to think of what would scare me the most." The Amityville Horror received generally negative reception from critics, but was a commercial success.

The Woods, which had been shelved for around 18 months, was released directly-to-DVD in October 2006, to a positive critical response. Nichols had a small part in the drama film Resurrecting the Champ (2007), playing the assistant to a sportswriter (Josh Hartnett) who believes he has found a former boxing legend (Samuel L. Jackson) living homeless on the streets. Also that year, Nichols had a bit part in the fact-based political drama Charlie Wilson's War (2007) and was cast in a new science fiction drama television series Them, which was ultimately not picked up by Fox.

Her first starring film role was in the 2007 horror–thriller P2, as a businesswoman who becomes trapped inside a public parking garage with a deranged security guard. About the dress her character wears for much of the film, Nichols said, "When I read the script originally, it wasn't a dress, it was a small nightgown with no bra or underwear. Then I read the first scene where she gets wet, and I went: 'OK, this has got to be altered!'" Nichols said in an interview that among the rules established in her contract were: "I will not get wet and show nipples" in addition to no nudity. A bra was sewn into the "Marilyn Monroe dress" she wore in the film. She said, "I wasn't going to run around for two months without a bra, I thought that was inappropriate. But in place of the nipples there's clearly a lot of cleavage. So we made a compromise." P2 was generally disliked by critics and flopped at the box office. Reviewer James Berardinelli said that her performance was "admirable, although one wonders whether she was cast more for her physical assets than her acting ability." John Anderson of Variety wrote that "Nichols is in territory well trod over the years by everyone from Fay Wray and Grace Kelly to Heather Langenkamp, the terrified but gutsy heroine, who in this case has been chloroformed and put into a sheer white evening dress by her abductor—who must have anticipated that his captive would try to escape in an elevator, which he could then fill with water. (Nichols' considerable physical attributes, henceforth, seem to occupy most of the screen.) She's sympathetic, hysterical when required and likeable."

Nichols had a supporting role in The Sisterhood of the Traveling Pants 2 (2008), playing a jealous friend of America Ferrera's character. Overall, the film was well received by critics. Roger Ebert commented that Nichols as her character Julia "proves a principle that should be in the Little Movie Glossary: If a short, curvy, sun-kissed heroine [Ferrera] has a tall, thin blond as a roommate, that blond is destined to be a bitch. No way around it." Stephen Holden, writing for The New York Times, similarly said, "It falls to Ms. Nichols to play the movie's designated blond baddie, a cold, arrogant vixen who tries to undermine [Ferrera's character's] triumphs in romance and onstage." Nichols was cast in Star Trek (2009) in November 2007, but due to the project's secrecy her role was initially unknown even to her; she said that month she did not even know her character's name. It was speculated that she would play Janice Rand, but she would actually play an Orion cadet at Starfleet Academy.

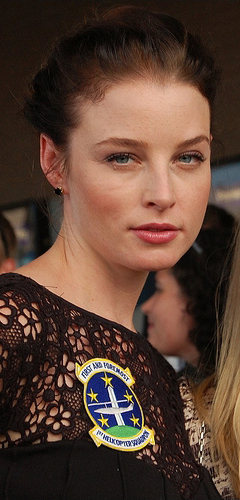
Nichols at a premiere for G.I. Joe: The Rise of Cobra, July 2009

Nichols was cast as Shana "Scarlett" O'Hara in the live-action film adaptation of the G.I. Joe franchise G.I. Joe: The Rise of Cobra (2009) in late 2007. She later said that she accepted director Stephen Sommers' offer for the role without having read the actual script. "I'd heard from other people that the script was quite good. And then when I finally got to read it myself ... I really, really liked it ... I liked that there were two kick-ass female roles. And I liked the fact that it wasn't just a big action movie ... And there was comedy in it. I was genuinely really happily surprised when I read the script." She put on approximately 15 pounds (6.8 kg) of muscle for the role and trained in mixed martial arts with co-star Sienna Miller for some of the film's action sequences. Nichols was burned by a flame during the filming of a fight scene with Miller. Like The Amityville Horror, G.I. Joe: The Rise of Cobra was not well received by most critics, but performed well at the box office. Richard Corliss of Time wrote that Nichols had "an appealing manner and comely biceps" as Scarlett O'Hara and took notice of her "savory girl fight with Sienna Miller, as the mostly villainous Baroness." After G.I. Joe, Nichols' next project was the horror film For Sale by Owner, where she played the half of a newly wed couple buying a house with a secret past. The film only received a direct-to-DVD release.

=== 2010s ===
Nichols starred as a police detective assigned to investigate the murder of a young boy in the small-scale crime drama Meskada (2010), which premiered at the Tribeca Film Festival and received a limited theatrical release in North America. In the 3-D sword and sorcery film Conan the Barbarian, a reimagining of the 1982 film, Nichols starred as a master of martial arts, a priestess, and the love interest of the titular character. She performed her own stunts in the high-stakes action scenes and fight sequences, but a double was used for a sex scene with co-star Jason Momoa. Filming occurred between March and July 2010 in Bulgaria, and Conan was released on August 19, 2011. Budgeted at US$90 million, the film received negative reviews, and only grossed US$48.8 worldwide. Boston Globe felt that Nichols portrayed her "pure-blooded innocent" character with the "enthusiasm of a bored office receptionist".

Nichols first guest starred in three episodes of the CBS television series Criminal Minds and was then promoted as a series regular. Her role was Ashley Seaver, an FBI cadet assigned to the BAU. The casting choice came amid uproar from the series' fanbase as she was brought in to replace exiting actresses A.J. Cook and Paget Brewster. However, as the season progressed, viewers eventually warmed to the character. "It just kind of worked. It was a long process," she said. It was eventually announced that Nichols had been let go from the show. Nichols next starred in the independent romantic comedy A Bird of the Air (2011) as "a librarian who joins a highway patrolman to uncover the mysteries behind the cryptic sayings spoken by an ancient parrot." She described the production as a "quirky, edgy love story" and felt that her part was a "departure from some of the roles I've been offered". The film received a limited theatrical release and a mixed critical response. The New York Times remarked that the actress "is consistently appealing in the kind of role Zooey Deschanel has pretty much cornered", while the Village Voice found her character to be a "grating twit".

In Continuum, a Canadian science fiction TV series, Nichols starred as a police officer against a group of rebels from the year 2077 who time-travel to Vancouver in the year 2012. The series premiered on Showcase on May 27, 2012, and its first episode became the highest-rated episode in the network's history. Continuum ran for four seasons until October 9, 2015, and earned Nichols a Constellation Award and two Saturn Award nominations for Best Actress on Television. Nichols starred opposite Tyler Perry in the thriller Alex Cross (2012), as the blighted colleague of a psychologist and police lieutenant. Like Conan, her previous wide release, the film garnered negative reviews, and made a lackluster US$34.6 million worldwide.

In the independent exploitation film Raze (2013), she appeared opposite Zoë Bell as women forced to fight against each other for the twisted entertainment of the wealthy elite. Nichols is credited as an executive producer in the film, and was drawn to the project for its female "empowering" message, remarking: "Give us a challenge and we'll meet it. We're stronger than you think we are. I loved that about it. That was what drew me to it and that's what had always been promised". Raze premiered at the Tribeca Film Festival and received a limited release in NYC and Los Angeles. She next starred with Nicolas Cage in the action thriller Rage (2014), as the wife of a reformed criminal seeking his own brand of justice after their daughter gets kidnapped. The film was released for selected theaters and VOD. In 2014, she made a one-episode appearance in the Lifetime series Witches of East End and debuted in a recurring arc in USA Network's Rush. The following year, she obtained a recurring role as a "problem employee at the law firm she works at" in the fourth season of Chicago Fire.

Nichols starred in the science-fiction thriller Pandemic (2016) as a doctor who leads a group to find survivors of a worldwide pandemic. The film was released for selected theaters and VOD, and in its review, The Hollywood Reporter remarked that Nichols "attempts to adopt an attitude somewhere between shell-shocked survivor and sympathetic physician, but doesn't manage to fulfill the role's potential". In Inside (2016), a Spanish-American remake of the 2007 French horror film of the same name, Nichols took on the starring role of a pregnant woman accosted in her home by an unknown woman who intends to steal her baby. The film was released in Spanish cinemas on July 28, 2017, where it made US$557,083, and in the United States on January 12, 2018. Nichols next obtained another recurring role on television as a former guardian who has been thrust back five centuries into the past to finally move forward, in the fourth season of the TNT fantasy series The Librarians. For her four-episode performance, she received a Saturn Award nomination for Best Guest Starring Role on Television.

In 2019, Nichols had a five-episode run as Martha Stroud, a Gestapo bodyguard, on the fourth season of the alternate history series The Man in the High Castle.

== Personal life ==
Nichols married film producer Scott Stuber on July 26, 2008, in Aspen, Colorado. Nichols allowed her hair to return to its natural blond color for the ceremony, as it had been dyed red for her consecutive roles in Star Trek and G.I. Joe: The Rise of Cobra. They were working on building a home in Cabo San Lucas shortly after their honeymoon. Seven months later, in February 2009, Nichols and Stuber separated and then divorced due to irreconcilable differences.

On December 30, 2013, Nichols confirmed her engagement to Michael Kershaw, a real estate developer. They married in September 2014.

== Filmography ==
=== Film ===
Year	Title	Role	Notes
2000	Autumn in New York	Model at bar	
2003	Relationship 101	Jennifer Masters	
2003	Dumb and Dumberer: When Harry Met Lloyd	Jessica Matthews	
2004	Debating Robert Lee	Trilby Moffat	
2005	The Amityville Horror	Lisa	
2005	Shopgirl	Trey's girlfriend	
2006	The Woods	Samantha Wise	Direct-to-DVD
2007	Resurrecting the Champ	Polly	
2007	P2	Angela Bridges	
2007	Charlie Wilson's War	Suzanne	
2008	The Sisterhood of the Traveling Pants 2	Julia Beckwith	
2009	Star Trek	Gaila	
2009	G.I. Joe: The Rise of Cobra	Shana "Scarlett" O'Hara	
2009	For Sale by Owner	Anna Farrier	Direct-to-DVD
2010	Meskada	Leslie Spencer	Direct-to-DVD
2011	Conan the Barbarian	Tamara	
2011	A Bird of the Air	Fiona	
2012	Alex Cross	Monica Ashe	
2013	Raze	Jamie	
2013	McCanick	Amy Intrator	
2014	Rage	Vanessa Maguire	
2016	Pandemic	Lauren Chase / Rebecca Thomas	
2016	Inside	Sarah Clarke	
2017	After Party	Charlie	
2020	Breach	Chambers	
2021	Demigod	Robin Murphy	
2024	The Inheritance	Madeline	

=== Television ===
Year	Title	Role	Notes
2002	Sex and the City	Alexa	Episode: "A 'Vogue' Idea"
2004	Line of Fire	Alex Myer	Episode: "Eminence Front: Parts 1 & 2"
2005	The Inside	Rebecca Locke	Main role
2005–2006	Alias	Rachel Gibson	Main role (season 5)
2007	Them	Donna Shaw	Television special
2010–2011	Criminal Minds	Ashley Seaver	Main role (season 6)
2012–2015	Continuum	Kiera Cameron	Main role
2014	Witches of East End	Isis	Episode: "The Brothers Grimoire"
2014	Rush	Corrinne Rush	Recurring role
2015	Chicago Fire	Jamie Killian	Recurring role (season 4)
2017–2018	The Librarians	Nicole Noone	Recurring role (season 4)
2018	Taken	Eve	Episode: "All About Eve"
2018–2019	Titans	Angela Azarath	Recurring role (season 1); guest role (season 2)
2019	The Man in the High Castle	Martha	5 episodes (season 4)
2021; 2023	A Million Little Things	Nicole	Recurring role (seasons 4–5)
2025	Invasion	Regan Byrne	Recurring role (season 3)

== Awards and nominations ==
Year	Association	Category	Work	Result
2005	Teen Choice Awards	Choice Movie Scream Scene	The Amityville Horror	Nominated
2006	MTV Movie Awards	Best Frightened Performance	The Amityville Horror	Nominated
2006	Method Fest	Best Cast	Debating Robert Lee	Won
2012	ITVFest	Best Actress	Underwater	Won
2013	Constellation Awards	Best Female Performance	Continuum	Won
2014	Saturn Awards	Best Actress on Television	Continuum	Nominated
2015	Saturn Awards	Best Actress on Television	Continuum	Nominated
2018	Saturn Awards	Best Guest Performance in a Television Series	The Librarians	Nominated
