= Filmfare Awards South =

Indian film awards

- Current: 70th Filmfare Awards South
- Awarded for: Excellence in the South Indian cinema
- Country: India
- Presented by: Filmfare (The Times Group)
- First award: 17 June 1964; 62 years ago
- Website: Filmfare Awards

Television/radio coverage
- Network: Star India (2000–19, 2024); Zee Entertainment Enterprises (2022; 2026–present)

The Filmfare Awards South are annual awards that honour artistic and technical excellence in the Telugu cinema, Tamil cinema, Malayalam cinema and Kannada cinema. They are presented by Filmfare magazine of The Times Group. Filmfare Awards began in 1954 to honor the films of 1953. The awards initially only recognized achievements in the Hindi cinema. In 1964 the awards were extended to Telugu, Tamil, Bengali and Marathi languages for the films released in 1963. The awards were extended to Malayalam cinema in 1967 and Kannada cinema in 1970.

Each industry is given its own set of creative awards in annual ceremonies that have predominantly been held in Chennai and Hyderabad. Before 1976, the ceremony was held in Mumbai along with Hindi segment. From 1976, the southern region segment were separated from awards for Hindi-language films and moved to Chennai first, and later to Hyderabad in 1997. The event made its debut in Bengaluru and Kochi in 2022 and 2026 respectively.

== History ==
The awards were first given in 1953 and the ceremony used to be held along with Hindi cinema's Filmfare Awards. The awards were held in the Kalaivanar Arangam, Chennai in the early days. Later the ceremony was shifted to the distinctive Music Academy.

In 1953, initially only the Hindi film industry was recognized. In 1963 Awards extended to Best Picture in Telugu, Tamil, Bengali & Marathi, for the awards and from 1966 Malayalam films were added. Kannada films became a part of the event in 1969. In 1972 the awards were extended to Best Actor, Best Actress and Best Director categories in all south Indian films. The categories for Special Awards were introduced in the 1980s and Best Music Direction in 1990s. Lifetime Achievement Award – South was first given in 1983. Award for Best Male debut and Female debut were given irregularly during the same period. Categories for Best Male Playback Singing and Best Female Playback Singing were introduced in 1997.

In 2002, awards for Best Supporting actors were given for Tamil and Telugu films. Since 2005, these awards were extended to the Malayalam and Kannada film industries. In the same year, additional categories such as Best Lyricist, Best Playback Singing were also introduced. Awards for Best Comedian were given from 2002 till 2006 and was discontinued later.

== Statuette ==
The statuette, depicting a woman whose arms uprise in a dance number with her fingers touching, is commonly referred to as "Black Lady" (or "The Lady in Black"). Originally designed by N.G. Pansare under the supervision of The Times of India's art director Walter Langhammer, it is generally made of bronze, its height is 46.5 cm and it weighs around five kg.

To celebrate the 25th year of the awards, the statues were made in silver and to celebrate the 50th year the statues were made in gold.

== The Red Carpet ==
The Red Carpet is a segment that takes place before the beginning of the actual ceremony. This is where actors, actresses, producers, directors, singers, composers, and others that have contributed to Indian cinema are introduced. Hosts question the celebrities about upcoming performances and who they think deserves to take the Black Lady home.

== Records ==
=== Most awards for an individual ===
| No. of Awards | Recipient | Image |
|---|---|---|
| 19 | Kamal Haasan | |

=== Most awards for a single language ===
| No. of Awards | Recipient | Image |
|---|---|---|
| 16 | Mammootty (for Malayalam Cinema) | |

=== Most awards for a film ===
| No. of Awards | Film |
|---|---|
| 9 | Nuvvostanante Nenoddantana |
| 9 | RRR |
| 8 | Anniyan |
| 8 | Baahubali 2: The Conclusion |
| 8 | Soorarai Pottru |
| 8 | Amaran |

=== Most awards for Best Director ===
| No. of Awards | Recipient | Image |
|---|---|---|
| 8 | K. Viswanath | |
| 8 | K. Balachander | |

=== Most awards for Best Actor (Popular) ===
| No. of Awards | Recipient | Image |
|---|---|---|
| 17 | Kamal Haasan | |

=== Most awards for Best Actress (Popular) ===
| No. of Awards | Recipient | Image |
|---|---|---|
| 7 | Lakshmi | |

=== Most awards for Best Actor (Critics) ===
| No. of Awards | Recipient | Image |
|---|---|---|
| 3 | Dulquer Salman | |
| 3 | Arvind Swamy | |

=== Most awards for Best Actress (Critics) ===
| No. of Awards | Recipient | Image |
|---|---|---|
| 2 | Nithya Menon | |
| 2 | Sruthi Hariharan | |
| 2 | Sai Pallavi | |
| 2 | Jyothika | |
| 2 | Aishwarya Rajesh | |

=== Most awards for Best Supporting Actor ===
| No. of Awards | Recipient | Image |
|---|---|---|
| 4 | Jagapathi Babu | |
| 4 | Achyuth Kumar | |

=== Most awards for Best Supporting Actress ===
| No. of Awards | Recipient | Image |
|---|---|---|
| 5 | Saranya Ponvannan | |

=== Most awards for Best Music Director ===
| No. of Awards | Recipient | Image |
|---|---|---|
| 18 | A. R. Rahman | |

=== Most awards for Best Lyricist ===
| No. of Awards | Recipient | Image |
|---|---|---|
| 6 | Sirivennela Seetharama Sastry | |

=== Most awards for Best Playback Singer (Male) ===
| No. of Awards | Recipient | Image |
|---|---|---|
| 6 | Karthik | |

=== Most awards for Best Playback Singer (Female) ===
| No. of Awards | Recipient | Image |
|---|---|---|
| 10 | K. S. Chithra | |
| 10 | Shreya Ghoshal | |

=== Most awards for Best Cinematographer ===
| No. of Awards | Recipient | Image |
|---|---|---|
| 4 | K. K. Senthil Kumar | |

=== Most awards for Best Choreographer ===
| No. of Awards | Recipient | Image |
|---|---|---|
| 6 | Prem Rakshith | |
| 6 | Sekhar | |

=== Most awards for Best Production Designer ===
| No. of Awards | Recipient | Image |
|---|---|---|
| 4 | Sabu Cyril | |

== Award categories ==
=== Creative awards ===
==== Telugu cinema ====
- Filmfare Award for Best Film – Telugu: since 1963
- Filmfare Award for Best Director – Telugu: since 1972
- Filmfare Award for Best Actor – Telugu: since 1972
- Filmfare Award for Best Actress – Telugu: since 1972
- Filmfare Award for Best Supporting Actor – Telugu: since 2002
- Filmfare Award for Best Supporting Actress – Telugu: since 2002
- Filmfare Award for Best Music Director – Telugu: since 1990
- Filmfare Award for Best Lyricist – Telugu: since 2005
- Filmfare Award for Best Male Playback Singer – Telugu: Since 1997
- Filmfare Award for Best Female Playback Singer – Telugu: since 2004
- Filmfare Critics Award for Best Film – Telugu: since 2010
- Filmfare Critics Award for Best Actor – Telugu: since 2015
- Filmfare Critics Award for Best Actress – Telugu: since 2015

==== Tamil cinema ====
- Filmfare Award for Best Film – Tamil: since 1963
- Filmfare Award for Best Director – Tamil: since 1972
- Filmfare Award for Best Actor – Tamil: since 1972
- Filmfare Award for Best Actress – Tamil: since 1972
- Filmfare Award for Best Supporting Actor – Tamil: since 2002
- Filmfare Award for Best Supporting Actress – Tamil: since 2002
- Filmfare Award for Best Music Director – Tamil: since 1990
- Filmfare Award for Best Lyricist – Tamil: since 2005
- Filmfare Award for Best Male Playback Singer – Tamil: since 2005
- Filmfare Award for Best Female Playback Singer – Tamil: since 1999
- Filmfare Critics Award for Best Film – Tamil: since 2022
- Filmfare Critics Award for Best Actor – Tamil: since 2011
- Filmfare Critics Award for Best Actress – Tamil: since 2015

==== Malayalam cinema ====
- Filmfare Award for Best Film – Malayalam: since 1966
- Filmfare Award for Best Director – Malayalam: since 1972
- Filmfare Award for Best Actor – Malayalam: since 1972
- Filmfare Award for Best Actress – Malayalam: since 1972
- Filmfare Award for Best Supporting Actor – Malayalam: since 2006
- Filmfare Award for Best Supporting Actress – Malayalam: since 2006
- Filmfare Award for Best Music Director – Malayalam: since 1990
- Filmfare Award for Best Lyricist – Malayalam: since 2006
- Filmfare Award for Best Male Playback Singer – Malayalam: since 2006
- Filmfare Award for Best Female Playback Singer – Malayalam: since 2006
- Filmfare Critics Award for Best Film – Malayalam: since 2022
- Filmfare Critics Award for Best Actor – Malayalam: since 2013
- Filmfare Critics Award for Best Actress – Malayalam: since 2015

==== Kannada cinema ====
- Filmfare Award for Best Film – Kannada: since 1969
- Filmfare Award for Best Director – Kannada: since 1972
- Filmfare Award for Best Actor – Kannada: since 1972
- Filmfare Award for Best Actress – Kannada: since 1972
- Filmfare Award for Best Supporting Actor – Kannada: since 2006
- Filmfare Award for Best Supporting Actress – Kannada: since 2006
- Filmfare Award for Best Music Director – Kannada: since 1990
- Filmfare Award for Best Lyricist – Kannada: since 2006
- Filmfare Award for Best Male Playback Singer – Kannada: since 2006
- Filmfare Award for Best Female Playback Singer – Kannada: since 2006
- Filmfare Critics Award for Best Film – Kannada: since 2022
- Filmfare Critics Award for Best Actor – Kannada: since 2015
- Filmfare Critics Award for Best Actress – Kannada: since 2015

=== Technical awards ===
- Filmfare Award for Best Production Design – South: since 1998
- Filmfare Award for Best Cinematographer – South: since 1997
- Filmfare Award for Best Choreography – South: since 1997
- Filmfare Award for Best Action Director – South: only 2005
- Filmfare Award for Best Editor – South: only 2005
- Filmfare Award Best Costume Designer - South : only 2010
- Filmfare Award for Best VFX – South: only 2012

=== Special awards ===
- Filmfare Special Award – South: since 1972
- Filmfare Award for Best Debut Director – South: since 2023
- Filmfare Award for Best Male Debut – South: since 2000
- Filmfare Award for Best Female Debut – South: since 1997
- Filmfare Lifetime Achievement Award – South: since 1984

=== Retired awards ===
- Filmfare Award for Best Comedian – Telugu: 2002 to 2005
- Filmfare Award for Best Comedian – Tamil: 2002 to 2005
- Filmfare Award for Best Villain – Telugu: 2002 to 2005
- Filmfare Award for Best Villain – Tamil: 2002 to 2005

== Ceremonies ==
- 11th Filmfare Awards South, held on 17 June 1964 in Bombay, Maharashtra
- 12th Filmfare Awards South, held in 1965 in Bombay, Maharashtra
- 13th Filmfare Awards South, held in 1966 in Bombay, Maharashtra
- 14th Filmfare Awards South, held in 1967 in Bombay, Maharashtra
- 15th Filmfare Awards South, held in 1968 in Bombay, Maharashtra
- 16th Filmfare Awards South, held in 1969 in Bombay, Maharashtra
- 17th Filmfare Awards South, held on 19 April 1970 in Bombay, Maharashtra
- 18th Filmfare Awards South, held on 18 April 1971 in Bombay, Maharashtra
- 19th Filmfare Awards South, held on 24 March 1972 in Bombay, Maharashtra
- 20th Filmfare Awards South, held on 21 April 1973 in Bombay, Maharashtra
- 21st Filmfare Awards South, held on 11 April 1974 in Bombay, Maharashtra
- 22nd Filmfare Awards South, held on 30 March 1975 in Bombay, Maharashtra
- 23rd Filmfare Awards South, held on 6 June 1976 in Madras, Tamil Nadu
- 24th Filmfare Awards South, held on 14 August 1977 in Madras, Tamil Nadu
- 25th Filmfare Awards South, held on in Madras, Tamil Nadu
- 26th Filmfare Awards South, held on 10 June 1979 in Madras, Tamil Nadu
- 27th Filmfare Awards South, held on 6 July 1980 in Madras, Tamil Nadu
- 28th Filmfare Awards South, held on 19 july 1981 in Madras, Tamil Nadu
- 29th Filmfare Awards South, held on August 1982 in Madras, Tamil Nadu
- 30th Filmfare Awards South, held on 5 September 1983 in Madras, Tamil Nadu
- 31st Filmfare Awards South, held in September 1984 in Madras, Tamil Nadu
- 32nd Filmfare Awards South, held in 1985 in Madras, Tamil Nadu
- 33rd Filmfare Awards South, held on 10 August 1986 in Madras, Tamil Nadu
- 34th Filmfare Awards South, held on 9 August 1987 in Madras, Tamil Nadu
- 35th Filmfare Awards South, held on 14 August 1988 in Madras, Tamil Nadu
- 36th Filmfare Awards South, held on 13 August 1989 in Madras, Tamil Nadu
- 37th Filmfare Awards South, held on 12 August 1990 in Madras, Tamil Nadu
- 38th Filmfare Awards South, held on 11 August 1991 in Madras, Tamil Nadu
- 39th Filmfare Awards South, held on 31 March 1993 in Bombay, Maharashtra
- 40th Filmfare Awards South, held on 13 October 1993 in Madras, Tamil Nadu
- 41st Filmfare Awards South, held on 24 September 1994 in Madras, Tamil Nadu
- 42nd Filmfare Awards South, held on 23 September 1995 in Madras, Tamil Nadu
- 43rd Filmfare Awards South, held on 14 September 1996 in Madras, Tamil Nadu
- 44th Filmfare Awards South, held on 30 August 1997 in Hyderabad, Andhra Pradesh
- 45th Filmfare Awards South, held on 13 June 1998 in Madras, Tamil Nadu
- 46th Filmfare Awards South, held on 24 April 1999 in Hyderabad, Andhra Pradesh
- 47th Filmfare Awards South, held on 22 April 2000 in Chennai, Tamil Nadu
- 48th Filmfare Awards South, held on 7 April 2001 in Hyderabad, Andhra Pradesh
- 49th Filmfare Awards South, held on 20 April 2002 in Chennai, Tamil Nadu
- 50th Filmfare Awards South, held on 24 May 2003 in Hyderabad, Andhra Pradesh
- 51st Filmfare Awards South, held on 12 June 2004 in Chennai, Tamil Nadu
- 52nd Filmfare Awards South, held on 23 July 2005 in Hyderabad, Andhra Pradesh
- 53rd Filmfare Awards South, held on 9 September 2006 in Chennai, Tamil Nadu
- 54th Filmfare Awards South, held on 4 August 2007 in Hyderabad, Andhra Pradesh
- 55th Filmfare Awards South, held on 12 July 2008 in Chennai, Tamil Nadu
- 56th Filmfare Awards South, held on 31 July 2009 in Hyderabad, Andhra Pradesh
- 57th Filmfare Awards South, held on 7 August 2010 in Chennai, Tamil Nadu
- 58th Filmfare Awards South, held on 2 July 2011 in Hyderabad, Andhra Pradesh
- 59th Filmfare Awards South, held on 7 July 2012 in Chennai, Tamil Nadu
- 60th Filmfare Awards South, held on 20 July 2013 in Hyderabad, Andhra Pradesh
- 61st Filmfare Awards South, held on 12 July 2014 in Chennai, Tamil Nadu
- 62nd Filmfare Awards South, held on 26 June 2015 in Chennai, Tamil Nadu
- 63rd Filmfare Awards South, held on 18 June 2016 in Hyderabad, Telangana
- 64th Filmfare Awards South, held on 17 June 2017 in Hyderabad, Telangana
- 65th Filmfare Awards South, held on 16 June 2018 in Hyderabad, Telangana
- 66th Filmfare Awards South, held on 21 December 2019 in Chennai, Tamil Nadu
- 67th Filmfare Awards South, held on 9 October 2022 in Bengaluru, Karnataka
- 68th Filmfare Awards South, announced digitally on 12 July 2024
- 69th Filmfare Awards South, held on 3 August 2024 in Hyderabad, Telangana
- 70th Filmfare Awards South, held on 21 February 2026 in Kochi, Kerala.
