= 22nd Filmfare Awards South =

Award ceremony for South Indian films

- Date: 1975
- Site: Bombay

The 22nd Filmfare Awards South ceremony honoring the winners of the best of South Indian cinema in 1974 was an event held at Shanmukhananda Hall Bombay on 30 March 1975 along with Hindi Awards.

The president of this year's function was Maharashtra Chief Minister S. B. Chavan. The chief guest of the evening, G. P. Sippy, being indisposed was represented by B. R. Chopra.

== Jury ==
Tamil & Malayalam	Telugu & Kannada
Justice S. Mohan - (Chairman); Mrs. Alamelu Rangachari; Dada Mirasee; Mrs. Mammen Mappillai; S. V. Venugopalan - (Ex Officio)	Justice G. Ramanujam - (Chairman); T. S. Muthuswami; A. Varadappa Chetty; S. V. Venugopalan - (Ex Officio)

== Awards ==
=== Kannada cinema ===
Best Film	Best Director
Kaadu - K. N. Narayan	Girish Karnad - Kaadu
Best Actor	Best Actress
Lokesh - Bhootayyana Maga Ayyu	Aarathi - Upasane

=== Malayalam cinema ===
Best Film	Best Director
Nellu - N. P. Ali	K. S. Sethumadhavan - Chattakkari
Best Actor	Best Actress
Kamal Haasan - Kanyakumari	Lakshmi - Chattakkari

=== Tamil cinema ===
Best Film	Best Director
Dikkatra Parvathi - Singeetham Srinivasa Rao	K. Balachandar - Aval Oru Thodar Kathai
Best Actor	Best Actress
Gemini Ganesan - Naan Avanillai	Lakshmi - Dikkatra Parvathi

=== Telugu cinema ===
Best Film	Best Director
O Seetha Katha - Sharma	K. Viswanath - O Seetha Katha
Best Actor	Best Actress
Sobhan Babu - Khaidi Babayi	Vanisri - Krishnaveni

=== Special awards ===
Special Commendation Award for Performance
- K. R. Vijaya - Dheerga Sumangali

Filmfare Special Award - South
- Upasane - Rashi Brothers

== Awards presentation ==
- K. N. Narayan (Best Film Kannada) Received Award from Asrani
- Amrish Puri Received Girish Karnad's award (Best Director Kannada) from Madan Puri
- Aarathi (Best Actress Kannada) Received Award from Jeetendra
- Lokesh (Best Actor Kannada)Received Award from Prema Narayan
- S. R. Puttanna Kanagal Received Producers (Rashi Brothers) award (Special Award) from A. K. Hangal
- N. P. Ali (Best Film Malayalam) Received Award from Dara Singh
- K S Sethumadhavan (Best Director Malayalam) Received Award from Asha Sachdev
- Lakshmi (Best Actress Malayalam) Received Award from Shammi Kapoor
- Kamal Haasan (Best Actor Malayalam) Received Award from Reeta Bhaduri
- K. R. S. Sharma (Best Film Telugu) Received Award from Zarina Wahab
- K. Viswanath (Best Director Telugu) Received Award from Farida Jalal
- Vanisri (Best Actress Telugu) Received Award from B. R. Chopra
- Sobhan Babu (Best Actor Telugu) Received Award from Nirupa Roy
- Singeetham Srinivasa Rao (Best Film Tamil) Received Award from Helen
- K. Balachandar (Best Director Tamil) Received Award from Vidya Sinha
- Lakshmi (Best Actress Tamil) Received Award from Amitabh Bachchan
