= 51st Filmfare Awards South =

Award ceremony for South Indian films

- Date: 12 June 2004
- Site: Jawaharlal Nehru Stadium, Chennai, Tamil Nadu, India

The 51st Filmfare Awards South ceremony, honouring the winners and nominees of the best of South Indian cinema in films released in 2003, is an event that was held at the Jawaharlal Nehru Stadium, Chennai, 12 June 2004.The awards were distributed at Chennai.

== Main awards ==
Winners are listed first, highlighted in boldface.

=== Kannada cinema ===
Best Film	Best Director
**Paris Pranaya**	**P. A. Arun Prasad – Kiccha**
Best Actor	Best Actress
**Sudeep – Swathi Muthu**	**Meena – Swathi Muthu**
Best Music Director
**R. P. Patnaik – Excuse Me**

=== Malayalam cinema ===
Best Film	Best Director
**Manassinakkare**	**Sathyan Anthikad – Manassinakkare**
Best Actor	Best Actress
**Jayaram – Manassinakkare**	**Meera Jasmine – Kasthooriman**
Best Music Director
**Ilaiyaraja – Manassinakkare**

=== Tamil cinema ===
Best Film	Best Director
**Pithamagan**; Anbe Sivam; Dhool; Kaaka Kaaka; Kadhal Kondein; Saamy	**Bala – Pithamagan**; Dharani - Dhool; Gautham Vasudev Menon - Kaaka Kaaka; Hari - Saamy; Selvaraghavan - Kadhal Kondein
Best Actor	Best Actress
**Vikram – Pithamagan**; Dhanush - Kadhal Kondein; Kamal Haasan - Anbe Sivam; Suriya - Kaaka Kaaka; Vikram - Saamy	**Laila – Pithamagan**; Jyothika - Kaaka Kaaka; Jyothika - Dhool; Sneha - Parthiban Kanavu
Best Supporting Actor	Best Supporting Actress
**Suriya - Pithamagan**; R. Madhavan - Anbe Sivam; Prakash Raj - Chokka Thangam	**Sangeeta - Pithamagan**; Reemma Sen - Dhool; Sridevi Vijayakumar - Priyamana Thozhi
Best Comedian	Best Villain
**Vivek - Saamy**	**Jeevan- Kaaka Kaaka**
Best Music Director
**Harris Jayaraj – Kaaka Kaaka**; A. R. Rahman - Boys; Vidyasagar - Dhool; Ilaiyaraaja - Pithamagan; Harris Jayaraj - Saamy

=== Telugu cinema ===
Best Film	Best Director
**Okkadu**; Aithe; Amma Nanna O Tamila Ammayi; Vasantham	**Gunasekhar – Okkadu**; S. S. Rajamouli - Simhadri; Rasool Ellore - Okariki Okaru; Puri Jagannadh - Amma Nanna O Tamila Ammayi
Best Actor	Best Actress
**Mahesh Babu – Okkadu**; Mahesh Babu – Nijam; Jr. NTR - Simhadri; Chiranjeevi - Tagore; Nandamuri Harikrishna - Seetayya	**Asin – Amma Nanna O Tamila Ammayi**; Asin - Sivamani; Bhoomika Chawla - Missamma; Sridevi Vijayakumar - Ninne Istapaddanu
Best Supporting Actor	Best Supporting Actress
**Prakash Raj - Tagore**; Shashank - Aithe; Prakash Raj - Amma Nanna O Tamila Ammayi; Krishnam Raju - Neeku Nenu Naaku Nuvvu	**Jayasudha - Amma Nanna O Tamila Ammayi**; Talluri Rameshwari - Nijam; Kalyani - Vasantham; Sindhu Tolani - Aithe
Best Comedian	Best Villain
**Ali - Amma Nanna O Tamila Ammayi**; Venu Madhav - Dil; Satyam Rajesh - Satyam; M. S. Narayana - Ottesi Cheputunna	**Pawan Malhotra - Aithe**; Mukesh Rishi - Seetayya; Prakash Raj - Okkadu; Rahul Dev - Simhadri
Best Music Director
**Mani Sharma – Okkadu**; M. M. Keeravani - Gangotri; Chakri - Satyam; S. A. Rajkumar - Vasantham

== Technical Awards ==
Best Choreography: Brinda – from Kaaka Kaaka	Best Cinematography: R. D. Rajasekhar – Kaaka Kaaka

== Special awards ==
Special Jury Award: Anbe Sivam - Tamil film	Lifetime Achievement: K. J. Yesudas; Vijayashanti	Filmfare Award for Best Male Debut - South: Vishnu Manchu - Vishnu	Best Male Playback Singer: Chakri - Satyam
