= 32nd Filmfare Awards South =

Award ceremony for South Indian films

- Date: 1985
- Site: Chennai

The 32nd Filmfare Awards South ceremony was held in Madras in 1985 to honor the winners of the best of South Indian cinema in 1984.

== Awards ==
=== Kannada cinema ===
Best Film	Best Director
Anubhava -Kashinath	Shankar Nag - Accident
Best Actor	Best Actress
Dr. Rajkumar - Shravana Banthu	Abhinaya - Anubhava

=== Malayalam cinema ===
Best Film	Best Director
Aalkkoottathil Thaniye - Raju Mathew	Bharathan - Ithiri Poove Chuvannapoove
Best Actor	Best Actress
Mammootty - Adiyozhukkukal	Seema -Adiyozhukkukal

=== Tamil cinema ===
Best Film	Best Director
Achamillai Achamillai - Rajam Balachandar, V. Natarajan	K. Balachandar - Achamillai Achamillai
Best Actor	Best Actress
Rajinikanth - Nallavanukku Nallavan	Saritha - Achamillai Achamillai

=== Telugu cinema ===
Best Film	Best Director
Swati - Kranthi Kumar	Jandhyala - Srivariki Premalekha
Best Actor	Best Actress
Krishnam Raju - Bobbili Brahmanna	Suhasini - Swati

=== Special awards ===
Special Award for excellent performance
- Vishnuvardhan - Bandhana

Lifetime Achievement Award
- Sowcar Janaki (actress)

== Award presentation ==
- Sowcar Janaki (Special Award for excellent contributions) received award from Sivaji Ganesan
- Krishnam Raju (Best Actor Telugu) received award from Gemini Ganesan
- K. Balachander (Best Director Tamil) received award from Sivaji Ganesan
