= 33rd Filmfare Awards South =

Award ceremony for South Indian films

- Date: August 10, 1986
- Site: Music Academy Chennai

The 33rd Filmfare Awards South ceremony honoring the winners of the best of South Indian cinema in 1985 was an event held on 10 August 1986 at Music Academy Chennai. The president of this year's function was the industrialist A. C. Muthiah.

== Awards ==
=== Kannada cinema ===
Best Film	Best Director
Bettada Hoovu - Parvathamma Rajkumar	N. Lakshmi Narayan - Bettada Hoovu
Best Actor	Best Actress
Rajkumar - Ade Kannu	Saritha - Mugila Mallige

=== Malayalam cinema ===
Best Film	Best Director
Nirakkoottu - Joy Thomas	Balu Mahendra - Yathra
Best Actor	Best Actress
Mammootty - Yathra	Nadhiya - Nokketha Doorathu Kannum Nattu

=== Tamil cinema ===
Best Film	Best Director
Sindhu Bhairavi - Rajam Balachandar	Fazil - Poove Poochooda Vaa
Best Actor	Best Actress
Sivaji Ganesan - Muthal Mariyathai	Radha - Muthal Mariyathai

=== Telugu cinema ===
Best Film	Best Director
Pratighatana - Ramoji Rao	Singeetam Srinivasa Rao - Mayuri
Best Actor	Best Actress
Chiranjeevi - Vijetha	Vijayashanti - Pratighatana

=== Special awards ===
Special Award for Best Child Actor
- Puneeth Rajkumar - Bettada Hoovu

Lifetime Achievement Award
- Padmini

== Awards Presentation ==
- Parvathamma Rajkumar (Best Film Kannada), received award from K. Balaji
- Joy Thomas, film producer (Best Film Malayalam), received award from Karthik
- Ramoji Rao (Best Film Telugu), received award from Gemini Ganesan
- K. Balachander (Best Film Tamil), received award from Sivakumar
- N. Lakshmi Narayan (Best Director Kannada), received award from S. P. Muthuraman
- Balu Mahendra (Best Director Malayalam), received award from Sowcar Janaki
- Singeetam Srinivasa Rao (Best Director Telugu), received award from Sumalatha
- Fazil (Best Director Tamil), received award from Rajasekhar
- Saritha (Best Actress Kannada), received award from Padmini
- Nadhiya (Best Actress Malayalam), received award from Revathi
- Vijayashanti (Best Actress Telugu), received award from K. G. George
- Radha (Best Actress Tamil), received award from Thirunavukkarasu
- Rajkumar (Best Actor Kannada), received award from A. C. Muthiah
- Chiranjeevi (Best Actor Telugu), received award from Suhasini Maniratnam
- Puneeth Rajkumar (Special Award), received award from Amala Akkineni
- Padmini (For Outstanding Contribution to South Indian Films), received award from A. C. Muthiah
