= 31st Filmfare Awards South =

Award ceremony for South Indian films

- Date: September 1984
- Site: Chennai

The 31st Filmfare Awards South ceremony was held in Madras in September 1984 to honour the winners of the best of South Indian cinema in 1983.

== Awards ==
=== Kannada cinema ===
Best Film	Best Director
Phaniyamma	Prema Karanth -Phaniyamma
Best Actor	Best Actress
Girish Karnad - Ananda Bhairavi	Suhasini - Benkiyalli Aralida Hoovu

=== Malayalam cinema ===
Best Film	Best Director
Koodevide - Rajan Joseph	Balachandra Menon - Karyam Nissaram
Best Actor	Best Actress
Bharath Gopi - Kattathe Kilikkoodu	Seema - Aaroodam

=== Tamil cinema ===
Best Film	Best Director
Mann Vasanai - Chitra Lakshmanan	A. Jagannathan - Vellai Roja
Best Actor	Best Actress
K. Bhagyaraj - Mundhanai Mudichu	Lakshmi - Unmaigal

=== Telugu cinema ===
Best Film	Best Director
Neti Bharatham - P. Venkateshwara Rao	K. Viswanath - Sagara Sangamam
Best Actor	Best Actress
Kamal Haasan - Sagara Sangamam	Jaya Prada - Sagara Sangamam

=== Special awards ===
Special Award for excellent performance
- Revathi - Man Vasanai
