= 20th Filmfare Awards South =

Award ceremony for South Indian films

- Date: April 21, 1973
- Site: Bombay

The 20th Filmfare Awards South ceremony honoring the winners of the best of South Indian cinema in 1972 was held on April 21, 1973 at Shanmukhananda Hall in Bombay along with Hindi Awards.

From this year, the awards were regularly presented to four main categories – Best Film, Best Director, Best Actor and Best Actress – in all four South Indian film industries. The president of this year's function was the defence minister Jagjivan Ram. The chief guest of the evening was veteran actor Ashok Kumar.

== Jury ==
Tamil, Telugu, Malayalam & Kannada
- Justice T. Ramaprasada Rao - (Chairman)
- M. R. Menon
- D. Ramanujam
- S. Rangaswami
- P. Ramakrishna Rao
- R. S. Cunniah
- C. G. Rangabhashyam
- Mrs. Rohini Krishna Chandra
- S. V. Venugopalan - (Ex Officio)

== Awards ==
=== Kannada cinema ===
Best Film	Best Director
Vamsha Vriksha - G. V. Iyer	B. V. Karanth, Girish Karnad - Vamsha Vriksha
Best Actor	Best Actress
Venkat Rao Talegiri - Vamsha Vriksha	Kalpana - Yaava Janmada Maitri

=== Malayalam cinema ===
Best Film	Best Director
Chembarathi - S. K. Nair	K. S. Sethumadhavan - Punarjanmam
Best Actor	Best Actress
Madhu - Swayamvaram	Roja Ramani - Chembarathi

=== Tamil cinema ===
Best Film	Best Director
Pattikada Pattanama - P. Madhavan	P. Madhavan - Gnana Oli
Best Actor	Best Actress
Sivaji Ganesan - Gnana Oli	Jayalalithaa - Pattikada Pattanama

=== Telugu cinema ===
Best Film	Best Director
Pandanti Kapuram - G. Hanumantha Rao	K. V. Reddy - Sri Krishna Satya
Best Actor	Best Actress
N. T. Rama Rao - Badi Panthulu	Jayalalithaa - Sri Krishna Satya

=== Special awards ===
Special Commendation Award for Performance
- Jamuna - Pandanti Kapuram

== Awards presentation ==
- G. V. Iyer (Best Film Kannada) Received Award from Devendra Goel
- S. K. Nair (Best Film Malayalam) Received Award from Sujit Kumar
- G. Hanumantha Rao (Best Film Telugu) Received Award from Deven Varma
- P. Madhavan (Best Film Tamil) Received Award from Rakesh Roshan
- N. T. Rama Rao Receives K. V. Reddy's Award (Best Director Telugu) from G. P. Sippy
- P. Madhavan (Best Director Tamil) Received Award from Farida Jalal
- Kalpana (Best Actress Kannada) Received Award from Jeetendra
- Roja Ramani (Best Actress Malayalam) Received Award from Ajit Wadekar
- Jayalalithaa (Best Actress Telugu) Received Award from Ashok Kumar
- Jayalalithaa (Best Actress Tamil) Received Award from Jairaj
- Venkat Rao Talegiri (Best Actor Kannada) Received Award from Rekha
- Madhu (Best Actor Malayalam) Received Award from Sanjay
- N. T. Rama Rao (Best Actor Telugu) Received Award from Yogeeta Bali
- Sivaji Ganesan (Best Actor Tamil) Received Award from Ashok Kumar
