= 26th Filmfare Awards South =

Award ceremony for South Indian films

- Date: 10 June 1979
- Site: Chennai
- Hosted by: Sowcar Janaki

The 26th Filmfare Awards South ceremony honoring the winners of the best of South Indian cinema in 1978 was held on 10 June 1979 at Kalaivanar Arangam in Madras.

The president of this year's function was the Major General S. P. Mahadevan, general officer commanding (GOC), Tamil Nadu, Andhra Pradesh, Karnataka and Kerala. The chief guest of the evening was Tamil Nadu Minister for Information and Hindu Endowments Thiru R. M. Veerappan.

== Awards ==
=== Kannada cinema ===
Best Film	Best Director
Ondanondu Kaladalli - L. N. Combines	Girish Karnad - Ondanondu Kaladalli
Best Actor	Best Actress
Rajkumar - Shankar Guru	Shoba - Aparichita

=== Malayalam cinema ===
Best Film	Best Director
Rathinirvedam - Hari Pothan	I. V. Sasi - Eeta
Best Actor	Best Actress
Kamal Haasan - Eeta	Jayabharathi - Vadakakku Oru Hridayam

=== Tamil cinema ===
Best Film	Best Director
Mullum Malarum - Venu Chettiar	Bharathiraja - Sigappu Rojakkal
Best Actor	Best Actress
Kamal Haasan - Sigappu Rojakkal	Latha - Vattathukkul Sathuram

=== Telugu cinema ===
Best Film	Best Director
Mana Voori Pandavulu - Jayakrishna	K. Balachandar - Maro Charitra
Best Actor	Best Actress
Chandra Mohan - Padaharella Vayasu	Talluri Rameshwari - Seetamalakshmi

=== Special awards ===
Special Commendation Award
- Lakshmi - Oru Nadigai Natakam Parkiral & Panthulamma

== Awards presentation ==
- Lakshmi (Special Award) Received Award from Srividya
- G. N. Lakshmipathy (Best Film Kannada) Received Award from Manjula Vijayakumar
- G. N. Lakshmipathy Received Girish Karnad Award (Best Director Kannada) from Vidhubala
- Shoba (Best Actress Kannada) Received Award from Prem Nazir
- Rajkumar (Best Actor Kannada)Received Award from Major General S. P. Mahadevan
- Hari Pothan (Best Film Malayalam) Received Award from Bindiya
- I. V. Sasi (Best Director Malayalam) Received Award from Thiru Veerappan
- Jayabharathi (Best Actress Malayalam) Received Award from K. R. Vijaya
- Kamal Haasan (Best Actor Malayalam) Received Award from Rekha
- Jayakrishna (Best Film Telugu) Received Award from Krishnam Raju
- K. Balachandar (Best Director Telugu) Received Award from Nutan
- Talluri Rameshwari (Best Actress Telugu) Received Award from Sheela
- Chandra Mohan (Best Actor Telugu) Received Award from Sharada
- V. Mohan (Best Film Tamil) Received Award from Vijayakumar
- Bharathiraja (Best Director Tamil) Received Award from Adoor Bhasi
- Rajkumar Sethupathy brother of Latha Received Latha's Award (Best Actress Tamil) from Asrani
- Kamal Haasan (Best Actor Tamil) Received Award from Rajesh Khanna
