= 23rd Filmfare Awards South =

Award ceremony for South Indian films

- Date: 6 June 1976
- Site: Chennai

The 23rd Filmfare Awards South ceremony honoring the winners of the best of South Indian cinema in 1975 is an event held in centenary auditorium Madras on 6 June 1976.

The chief guests were Tamil Nadu governor K. K. Shah & director B. N. Reddy.

== Awards ==
=== Kannada cinema ===
Best Film	Best Director
Chomana Dudi - Praja Films	B. V. Karanth - Chomana Dudi
Best Actor	Best Actress
Rajkumar - Mayura	Aarathi - Shubhamangala

=== Malayalam cinema ===
Best Film	Best Director
Raagam - N. P. Ali	Bharathan - Prayanam
Best Actor	Best Actress
Adoor Bhasi - Raagam	Lakshmi - Chalanum

=== Tamil cinema ===
Best Film	Best Director
Apoorva Raagangal - P. R. Govindarajan	K. Balachandar - Apoorva Raagangal
Best Actor	Best Actress
Kamal Haasan - Apoorva Raagangal	Sujatha - Uravu Solla Oruvan

=== Telugu cinema ===
Best Film	Best Director
Jeevana Jyothi - D. V. S. Raju	K. Viswanath - Jeevana Jyothi
Best Actor	Best Actress
Sobhan Babu - Jeevana Jyothi	Vanisri - Jeevana Jyothi

=== Special awards ===
Special Commendation Award for Performance
- Srividya - Apoorva Raagangal
- Dasari Narayana Rao - Swargam Narakam & Balipeetam

== Awards Presentation ==
- Sobhan Babu (Best Actor Telugu) received award from Sivaji Ganesan
- Vanisri (Best Actress Telugu) received award from Amol Palekar
