= 29th Filmfare Awards South =

Award ceremony for South Indian films

- Date: August 1982
- Site: Chennai

The 29th Filmfare Awards South ceremony, honoring the winners of the best of South Indian cinema in 1981, was held in Madras August 1982.

== Awards ==
=== Kannada cinema ===
Best Film	Best Director
Ranganayaki - Shringar Nagaraj	Puttanna Kanagal - Ranganayaki
Best Actor	Best Actress
Rajkumar - Keralida Simha	Aarathi - Ranganayaki

=== Malayalam cinema ===
Best Film	Best Director
Trishna - Rosamma George	K. S. Sethumadhavan - Oppol
Best Actor	Best Actress
Nedumudi Venu - Vida Parayum Munpe	Jalaja - Venal

=== Tamil cinema ===
Best Film	Best Director
Thanneer Thanneer - P. R. Govindarajan, J. Duraiswamy	K. Balachandar - Thanneer Thanneer
Best Actor	Best Actress
Kamal Haasan - Raja Paarvai	Sridevi - Meendum Kokila

=== Telugu cinema ===
Best Film	Best Director
Saptapadi - Buchi Reddy Bheemavarapu	Dasari Narayana Rao - Premabhishekam
Best Actor	Best Actress
Kamal Haasan - Aakali Rajyam	Radhika - Nyayam Kavali
