= 48th Filmfare Awards South =

Award ceremony for South Indian films

- Date: 7 April 2001
- Site: Lalitha Kala Thoranam Hyderabad, Andhra Pradesh, India

The 48th Filmfare Awards South ceremony, honouring the winners and nominees of the best of South Indian cinema for films released 2000, was held at the Lalitha Kala Thoranam, Public Gardens, Hyderabad, on 7 April 2001.

== Main awards ==
=== Kannada cinema ===
Best Film	Best Director
Sparsha	Sunil Kumar Desai – Sparsha
Best Actor	Best Actress
Vishnuvardhan – Yajamana	Sudharani – Sparsha
Best Music Director
Hamsalekha – Preethse

=== Malayalam cinema ===
Best Film	Best Director
Karunam	Jayaraj – Karunam
Best Actor	Best Actress
Mammootty – Arayannangalude Veedu	Samyuktha Varma – Mazha
Best Music Director
Mohan Sithara – Joker

=== Tamil cinema ===
Best Film	Best Director
Kandukondain Kandukondain	Rajeev Menon – Kandukondain Kandukondain
Best Actor	Best Actress
Kamal Haasan – Hey Ram	Jyothika – Kushi
Best Music Director
A. R. Rahman – Alaipayuthey

=== Telugu cinema ===
Best Film	Best Director
Nuvve Kavali	K. Vijaya Bhaskar – Nuvve Kavali
Best Actor	Best Actress
Venkatesh – Jayam Manade Raa	Richa Pallod – Nuvve Kavali
Best Music Director
Mani Sharma – Chirunavvutho

== Technical Awards ==
Best Choreography: Lawrence – Annayya - "Aatakavala Paatakavala" Song	Best Cinematography: P. C. Sreeram – Alaipayuthey

== Special awards ==
Lifetime Achievement: D. Ramanaidu; Sheela	Filmfare Award for Best Male Debut - South: R. Madhavan - Alaipayuthey	Best Playback Singer: Sriram Prabhu - Nuvve Kavali - "Ekkada vunna" song
