= 41st Filmfare Awards South =

Award ceremony for South Indian films

- Date: 24 September 1994
- Site: Madras, Tamil Nadu, India
- Hosted by: Priya Raman
- Produced by: Co-Optex

The 41st Filmfare Awards South Ceremony honouring the winners of the best of South Indian cinema in 1993 was held on 24 September 1994 was an event held at the Kamaraj Hall, Madras.

== Awards ==
=== Main awards ===
==== Kannada cinema ====
Best Film	Best Director
Aakasmika	Rajendra Singh Babu - Hoovu Hannu
Best Actor	Best Actress
Rajkumar- Aakasmika	Lakshmi - Hoovu Hannu
Best Music Director
Hamsalekha - Aakasmika

==== Malayalam cinema ====
Best Film	Best Director
Vatsalyam	Shaji Kailas - Ekalavyan
Best Actor	Best Actress
Mohanlal - Devasuram	Madhavi - Aakashadoothu
Best Music Director
S. P. Venkatesh - Paithrukam

==== Tamil cinema ====
Best Film	Best Director
Gentleman	Shankar -Gentleman
Best Actor	Best Actress
Karthik - Ponnumani	Revathy -Marupadiyum
Best Music Director
A. R. Rahman - Gentleman

==== Telugu cinema ====
Best Film	Best Director
Matru Devo Bhava	K. Raghavendra Rao - Allari Priyudu
Best Actor	Best Actress
Chiranjeevi- Muta Mesthri	Vijayashanti- Police Lockup
Best Music Director
M M Keeravani- Allari Priyudu

=== Lifetime Achievement Awards ===
Lifetime Achievement
- Gemini Ganesan (Actor)

== Awards Presentation ==
- Rajendra Singh Babu (Best Director Kannada) Received Award from Balu Mahendra
- A. R. Rahman (Best Music Director Tamil) Received Award from Sarika
- Lakshmi (Best Actress Kannada) Received Award from Shobana
- Revathy (Best Actress Tamil) Received Award from Khushbu
- Mohanlal (Best Actor Malayalam) Received Award from Madhoo
- Chiranjeevi (Best Actor Telugu) Received Award from Kamal Haasan
- Gemini Ganesan (Lifetime Achievement Award) Receives Award from Rekha
