= 30th Filmfare Awards South =

Award ceremony for South Indian films

- Date: 5 September 1983
- Site: Chennai

The 30th Filmfare Awards South ceremony honoring the winners of the best of South Indian cinema in 1982 was held on September 5, 1983 at Madras Music Academy, Madras.

== Awards ==
=== Kannada cinema ===
Best Film	Best Director
Bara - M. S. Sathyu	M. S. Sathyu - Bara
Best Actor	Best Actress
Anant Nag - Bara	Saritha - Hosa Belaku

=== Malayalam cinema ===
Best Film	Best Director
Ee Nadu - N. G. John	Balu Mahendra - Olangal
Best Actor	Best Actress
Bharath Gopi - Ormakkayi	Poornima Bhagyaraj - Olangal

=== Tamil cinema ===
Best Film	Best Director
Enkeyo Ketta Kural - Panju Arunachalam	Balu Mahendra - Moondram Pirai
Best Actor	Best Actress
Mohan - Payanangal Mudivathillai	Poornima Bhagyaraj - Payanangal Mudivathillai

=== Telugu cinema ===
Best Film	Best Director
Meghasandesam - Dasari Narayana Rao	K. Viswanath - Subhalekha
Best Actor	Best Actress
Chiranjeevi - Subhalekha	Jayasudha - Gruhapravesam
