= 39th Filmfare Awards South =

Award ceremony for South Indian films

- Date: 31 March 1993
- Site: Bombay, Maharashtra, India
- Produced by: Lux

The 39th Filmfare Awards South ceremony honouring the winners of the best of South Indian cinema in 1991 was an event held on 31 March 1993 along with Bollywood Filmfare Awards was an event held at the Bombay City.

== Awards ==
=== Main awards ===
==== Kannada cinema ====
Best Film	Best Director
Gauri Ganesha	Lokesh - Bhujangayyana Dashavatara
Best Actor	Best Actress
Anant Nag- Gauri Ganesha	Malashri - Hrudaya Haadithu
Best Music Director
Hamsalekha - Ramachaari

==== Malayalam cinema ====
Best Film	Best Director
Perumthachan	Sibi Malayil - Bharatham
Best Actor	Best Actress
Mammootty - Amaram	Amala - Ulladakkam
Best Music Director
Raveendran - Bharatham

==== Tamil cinema ====
Best Film	Best Director
Chinna Thambi	Mani Ratnam -Thalapathi
Best Actor	Best Actress
Kamal Haasan - Guna	Gautami -Nee Pathi Naan Pathi
Best Music Director
Ilaiyaraja - Thalapathi

==== Telugu cinema ====
Best Film	Best Director
Seetharamaiah Gari Manavaralu	Kranthi Kumar - Seetharamaiah Gari Manavaralu
Best Actor	Best Actress
Akkineni Nageswara Rao- Seetharamaiah Gari Manavaralu	Sridevi- Kshana Kshanam
Best Music Director
M. M. Keeravani - Kshana Kshanam

== Awards presentation ==
- Vishwa Sagar (Best Film Kannada) Received Award from Govind Nihalani
- G. Jayakumar (Best Film Malayalam) Received Award from Ashok Thakeria
- K. Balu (Best Film Tamil) Received Award from Umesh Mehra
- Lokesh (Best Director Kannada) Received Award from Bindu
- Kranthi Kumar (Best Director Telugu) Received Award from Asha Sachdev
- Mani Ratnam (Best Director Tamil) Received Award from Jaya Bachchan
- Mukul Anand Received Amala Award (Best Actress Malayalam) from Ashwini Bhave
- Malashri (Best Actress Kannada) Received Award from Poonam Dhillon
- Sridevi (Best Actress Telugu) Received Award from Madhuri Dixit
- Gautami (Best Actress Tamil) Received Award from Aamir Khan
- Mammootty (Best Actor Malayalam) Received Award from Rekha
- Mukul Anand Received Akkineni Nageswara Rao Award (Best Actor Telugu) from Anupam Kher
- Kamal Haasan (Best Actor Tamil) Received Award from Juhi Chawla
