= 37th Filmfare Awards South =

Award ceremony for South Indian films

- Date: 12 August 1990
- Site: Kamaraj Memorial Hall Madras, Tamil Nadu, India

The 37th Filmfare Awards South ceremony honouring the winners of the best of South Indian cinema in 1989 was an event held at the Kamaraj Memorial Hall, Madras 12 August 1990. The chief guest of the evening was Dilip Kumar & Tamil Nadu governor Krishan Kant addressing the gathering. The winners list announced on 13 June 1990.

== Awards ==
=== Main awards ===
==== Kannada cinema ====
Best Film	Best Director
Sankranthi - K S Sacchidananda,H B Dharmaraj	Sunil Kumar Desai - Tarka
Best Actor	Best Actress
Ananth Nag - Hendthighelbedi	Saritha - Sankranthi

==== Malayalam cinema ====
Best Film	Best Director
Oru Vadakkan Veeragatha - P. V. Gangadharan	Shaji N Karun - Piravi
Best Actor	Best Actress
Premji - Piravi	Rekha - Dasharatham

==== Tamil cinema ====
Best Film	Best Director
Apoorva Sagodharargal - Kamal Haasan	K. Balachander -Pudhu Pudhu Arthangal
Best Actor	Best Actress
Karthik - Varusham Padhinaaru	Bhanupriya -Aararo Aaariraro

==== Telugu cinema ====
Best Film	Best Director
Shiva - Akkineni Venkat, Yarlagadda Surendra	Mani Ratnam - Geethanjali
Best Actor	Best Actress
Kamal Haasan - Indrudu Chandrudu	Vijayashanti - Bharatanaari

=== Special Awards ===
Filmfare Award for Outstanding Contribution to Music
- Ilaiyaraaja (Music Director)

== Awards Presentation ==
- Rekha Harris (Best Actress Malayalam) received award from Khushbu
- Saritha (Best Actress Kannada) received award from Bharathi Raja
- A. M. Rathnam receives on behalf of Vijayashanti (Best Actress Telugu) award from Abhilasha
- Bhanupriya (Best Actress Tamil) received award from Balu Mahendra
- Manirathnam (Best Director Telugu) received award from Madhavi
- K. Balachander (Best Director Tamil) received award from Krishan Kant
- Sunil Kumar Desai (Best Director Kannada) received award from Archana
- Shaji N. Karun (Best Director Malayalam) received award from Sarika Thakur
- Kamal Haasan (Best film Tamil) received award from Mrs. Krishan Kant
- P. V. Gangadharan (Best film Malayalam) received award from G. Venkateswaran
- Dharmaraj (Best film Kannada) received award from Hariharan
- A. Venkat (Best film Telugu) received award from Revathi
- Kamal Haasan (Best Actor Telugu) received award from Dilip Kumar
- Premji (Best Actor Malayalam) received award from Padmini
- Karthik (Best Actor Tamil) received award from Saira Banu
- Prakash receives on behalf of Anant Nag (Best Actor Kannada) award from Gemini Ganesan
- Ilaiyaraaja (for outstanding contributions to South Indian Cinema as a Music Composer) received award from Dilip Kumar
