= Filmfare Lifetime Achievement Award – South =

Achievement Award given annually by the Filmfare Magazine

The Filmfare Lifetime Achievement Award is given by the Filmfare magazine as part of its annual Filmfare Awards South ceremony. Following is a list of the award recipients.The lifetime Achievement award south was first instituted in 1984 & those who are recognised Legendary filmmakers, artists, film personalities for outstanding contributions to Indian cinema.

== Recipients ==
† Indicates also honoured by Dadasaheb Phalke Award

Year	Honorees	Nature of work	Ref.
1984	Sowkar Janaki	Actress	
1985	Padmini	Actress	
1986	Thikkurissy Sukumaran Nair	Lyricist	
1986	S. P. Balasubrahmanyam	Playback Singer	
1987	Akkineni Nageswara Rao †	Actor	
1988	Bhanumathi Ramakrishna	Actress	
1989	Ilayaraja	Music Director	
1990	M. T. Vasudevan Nair	Screenplay Writer/Filmmaker	
1991	No award		
1992	L. V. Prasad †	Director / Producer	
1993	Gemini Ganesan	Actor	
1994	B. Saroja Devi	Actress	
1994	K. Balachander †	Director	
1994	Madhu	Actor	
1994	K. Viswanath †	Director	
1994	Soumitra Chatterjee †	Actor	
1994	Hrishikesh Mukherjee †	Director	
1995	Nagesh	Actor	
1995	Manorama	Actress	
1996	Krishna	Actor	
1996	Sarada	Actress	
1997	S. Janaki	Singer	
1997	Nedumudi Venu	Actor	
1998	Lakshmi	Actress	
1998	Allu Ramalingaiah	Actor	
1999	Pandari Bai	Actress	
1999	Sundaram	Choreographer	
2000	D. Rama Naidu †	Producer	
2000	Sheela	Actress	
2001	M. S. Viswanathan	Music Director	
2001	Dasari Narayana Rao	Director	
2002	Vishnuvardhan	Actor	
2002	K. Raghavendra Rao	Director	
2003	Vijayashanti	Actress	
2003	K. J. Yesudas	Singer	
2004	K. R. Vijaya	Actress	
2004	Ramoji Rao	Producer	
2005	Thilakan	Actor	
2005	Sukumari	Actress	
2006	Krishnam Raju	Actor	
2006	P. Susheela	Singer	
2007	Sivakumar	Actor	
2007	Jaya Prada	Actress	
2008	Veturi	Lyricist	
2009	Ambareesh	Actor	
2009	K. P. A. C. Lalitha	Actress	
2010	Chiranjeevi	Actor	
2010	Jayasudha	Actress	
2011	S. P. Muthuraman	Director	
2011	Seema	Actress	
2012	Bapu	Director	
2012	Vani Jairam	Singer	
2013	Balu Mahendra (posthumous)	Cinematographer	
2013	Jayabharathi	Actress	
2014	IV Sasi	Director	
2014	Radhika	Actress	
2015	Mohan Babu	Actor	
2016	Vijaya Nirmala	Actress	
2017	Kaikala Satyanarayana	Actor	
2018	Hariharan	Director	
2019	AWARDS FUNCTION WAS SUSPENDED DUE TO COVID-19 PANDEMIC		
2020–2021	Puneeth Rajkumar (posthumous)	Actor	
2020–2021	Allu Aravind	Producer	
2022	No award		
2023	Srinath	Actor	
2024	Sreenivasan (posthumous)	Actor/ Writer	
2024	Sreekumaran Thampi	Director/ Writer	
