= 17th Filmfare Awards South =

Award ceremony for South Indian films

- Date: April 19, 1970
- Site: Shanmukhananda hall Bombay
- Hosted by: David

The 17th Filmfare Awards South ceremony, honoring the winners of the best of South Indian cinema in 1969, was held on April 19, 1970 at Shanmukhananda hall in Bombay along with Hindi Awards.

The Kannada films were added in this year. The president of this year's function was the minister of state information and broadcasting I. K. Gujral. The chief guest of the evening was Satyajit Ray.

== Jury ==
Tamil, Telugu, Malayalam & Kannada
- Justice P. R. Gokulakrishnan - (Chairman)
- Mr. Sundarlal Nahata
- Brig. S. Kesavulu
- Mrs. P. Kala Bashyam
- Mrs. P. Leela
- A. Varadappa Chetty
- Mrs. Soundaram Kailasam
- S. V. Venugopalan
- M. Sivaraman - (Ex Officio)

== Awards ==
Best Tamil Film	Best Telugu Film
Adimai Penn - M. G. Ramachandran	Bangaru Panjaram - B. N. Reddy
Best Kannada Film	Best Malayalam Film
Namma Makkalu - Harini	Adimakal - M. O. Joseph

== Awards presentation ==
- M. G. Ramachandran (Best Film Tamil) Received Award from I. K. Gujral
- Harini (Best Film Kannada) Received Award from Achala Sachdev
- P. Joseph (Best Film Malayalam) Received Award from Raakhee
