= 18th Filmfare Awards South =

Award ceremony for South Indian films

- Date: 18 April 1971
- Site: Shanmukhananda Hall Bombay
- Hosted by: Shatrughan sinha and Asrani

The 18th Filmfare Awards South ceremony, honoring the winners of the best of South Indian cinema in 1970, was held at Shanmukhananda Hall Bombay on 18 April 1971 along with Hindi Awards.

The president of this year's function was the Governor of Maharashtra Ali Yavar Jung. The chief guest of the evening was Vietnamese film star Kieu Chinh.

== Jury ==
Tamil, Telugu, Malayalam & Kannada
- Justice Ramprasad Rao - (Chairman)
- A. L. Srinivasan
- Mariappa Bhatt
- Dr. (Mrs.) S. Cherian
- D. Ramanujam
- R. S. Cunniah
- Mrs. Umayal Ramanathan
- S. V. Venugopalan - (Ex Officio)

== Awards ==
Best Tamil Film	Best Telugu Film
Engirundho Vandhaal - K. Balaji	Dharma Daata - Tammareddy Krishna Murthy
Best Kannada Film	Best Malayalam Film
Sri Krishnadevaraya - B. R. Panthulu	Vaazhve Mayam - M. O. Joseph

== Awards presentation ==
- B. R. Panthulu (Best Film Kannada) Received Award from Rekha
- M. O. Joseph (Best Film Malayalam) Received Award from Biswajit
- T. G. Krishnamurthy (Best Film Telugu) Received Award from Nimmi
- K. Balaji (Best Film Tamil) Received Award from Joysree Roy
