= 15th Filmfare Awards South =

Award ceremony for South Indian films

- Date: 1968
- Site: Bombay

The 15th Filmfare Awards South ceremony, honoring the best of South Indian cinema in the year 1967, was held in 1968.

== Awards ==
Best Tamil Film	Best Telugu Film
Karpooram - V. T. Arasu	Chadarangam - Badeti Satyanarayana, Putla Venkata Rao
Best Malayalam Film
Agniputhri - Prem Nawaz
