= 19th Filmfare Awards South =

Award ceremony for South Indian films

- Date: 24 March 1972
- Site: Shanmukhananda Hall Bombay

The 19th Filmfare Awards South ceremony honoring the winners of the best of South Indian cinema in 1971 was held at Shanmukhananda Hall Bombay on 24 March 1972, along with Hindi Awards.

The awards were introduced in 1954, around the films released in 1953. Filmfare Awards, initially recognizing only the Hindi film industry, considered South Indian regional Telugu and Tamil cinema was honored from 1964 onwards. In 1966, awards were presented to Best Film in Malayalam cinema and the Kannada cinema was honored from 1970 onwards. The chief guest of the evening was General Sam Manekshaw.

== Jury ==
Tamil, Telugu, Malayalam & Kannada
- Justice Sadasivam - (Chairman)
- T. S. Muthuswami
- K. Cherian
- R. S. Cunniah
- U. Harini
- C. N. Ramanujam
- Mrs. Sivasailam
- S. V. Venugopalan - (Ex Officio)

== Awards ==
Best Tamil Film	Best Telugu Film
Babu - Cine Bharath Productions	Tahsildar Gari Ammayi - N. V. V. Sathya Narayana, A. Surya Narayana
Best Kannada Film	Best Malayalam Film
Sharapanjara - C. S. Rajah	Aabhijathyam - R. S. Prabhu

== Awards presentation ==
- C. S. Rajah (Best Film Kannada) Received Award from Rekha
- R. S. Prabhu (Best Film Malayalam) Received Award from Rakesh Roshan
- N. V. V. Sathya Narayana and A. Surya Narayana (Best Film Telugu) Received Award from Nanditha Bose
- Director A. C. Tirulokchandar (Best Film Tamil) Received Award from Jayant
