= 14th Filmfare Awards South =

Award ceremony for South Indian films

- Date: 1967
- Site: Bombay

The 14th Filmfare Awards South ceremony, honoring the winners of the best of South Indian cinema in 1966, was held in 1967. The Malayalam films are added in this year.

== Awards ==
Best Tamil Film	Best Telugu Film
Ramu - AVM Productions	Aastiparulu - V. B. Rajendra Prasad
Best Malayalam Film
Chemmeen - Hasam Ismail

=== Special awards ===
Special Commendation Award for Performance
- Jayalalithaa - Chandhrodhayam
