= 13th Filmfare Awards South =

Award ceremony for South Indian films

- Date: 1966
- Site: Bombay

The 13th Filmfare Awards South ceremony honoring the winners of the best of South Indian cinema in 1965 was held on 1966.

== Awards ==
Best Tamil Film	Best Telugu Film
Thiruvilaiyadal - A. P. Nagarajan	Antastulu - V. B. Rajendra Prasad
Special Award
M. G. Ramachandran - Enga Veettu Pillai
