= 16th Filmfare Awards South =

Award ceremony for South Indian films

- Date: 1969
- Site: Bombay

The 16th Filmfare Awards South ceremony honoring the best of South Indian cinema in 1968 was held in 1969.

== Awards ==
Best Tamil Film	Best Telugu Film
Lakshmi Kalyanam - A. L. Srinivasan	Sudigundalu - Akkineni Nageswara Rao Adurthi Subba Rao
Best Malayalam Film
Thulabharam - M/s. Supriya Pictures
