= Apoorva Raagangal =

1975 Indian Tamil-language film by K. Balachander

- Theatrical release poster
- Directed by: K. Balachander
- Written by: K. Balachander
- Produced by: V. Govindarajan; J. Duraisamy
- Starring: Kamal Haasan; Sundarrajan; Srividya; Jayasudha
- Cinematography: B. S. Lokanath
- Edited by: N. R. Kittu
- Music by: M. S. Viswanathan
- Production company: Kalakendra Movies
- Distributed by: Vijaya Films
- Release date: 15 August 1975
- Running time: 146 minutes
- Country: India
- Language: Tamil

Apoorva Raagangal (pronounced [apuːɾʋa ɾaːɡaŋɡaɭ] transl. Rare melodies) is a 1975 Indian Tamil-language romantic drama film written and directed by K. Balachander. It stars Kamal Haasan, Sundarrajan, Srividya and Jayasudha, while Nagesh and Rajinikanth, in his feature film debut, play supporting roles. The film revolves around Prasanna (Haasan) who falls in love with the much older Bhairavi (Srividya) while Bhairavi's daughter Ranjani (Jayasudha) is drawn to Prasanna's father Mahendran (Sundarrajan).

Apoorva Raagangal's theme was based on a riddle featured in the Indian folktale collection Vetala Panchavimshati about a king marrying a woman and his son marrying her mother, and Vetala, the riddler asking Vikramaditya what would be their kinship relations if these couples were to beget children. The film was produced by V. Govindarajan and J. Duraisamy under the Kalakendra Films banner, photographed by B. S. Lokanath and edited by N. R. Kittu; the music was composed by M. S. Viswanathan. Unlike many contemporaneous Tamil films, it was shot entirely in actual houses for their interiors without building sets, as Balachander wanted to convey a more authentic narration.

Apoorva Raagangal was released on 15 August 1975. Despite exploring the concept of relationships between people with wide age gaps, which challenged Indian social mores, it received critical acclaim and became a commercial success, and a breakthrough for Srividya and Haasan. The film won three National Film Awards, including Best Feature Film in Tamil, and three Filmfare Awards South in the Tamil branch: Best Feature Film, Best Director for Balachander and Best Actor for Haasan, and a Special Award for Srividya. It was remade in Telugu as Thoorpu Padamara (1976) where Srividya and Nagesh reprised their roles, and in Hindi by Balachander as Ek Nai Paheli (1984) where Haasan reprised his role.

== Plot ==
Prasanna is a young man involved in revolutionary activities against the wishes of his widowed father, Mahendran. After Prasanna admits that he stole rice from a lorry because of rising prices, distributed it to the poor and set the lorry on fire before the police arrived, Mahendran, disgusted by his actions, helps the police arrest him, deepening their estrangement. After his release, Prasanna leaves his hometown, Bangalore, for Madras.

Prasanna is later beaten after abusing passengers whose car splashed water on him. Carnatic singer Bhairavi finds him unconscious after returning from a katcheri, takes him home and has her doctor friend Suri treat him. At her request, Prasanna remains in her house after recovering and gradually develops romantic feelings for her despite their considerable age difference.

Meanwhile, Ranjani, a young soap seller, meets Mahendran in Bangalore during a play and notices him crying rather than responding like the other audience members. She follows him until he explains that he longs for his estranged son and deceased wife. At his request, she stays at his house for several days. Moved by his devotion to his late wife and his concern for Prasanna, as well as his willingness to help her, Ranjani proposes marriage despite Mahendran being old enough to be her father.

Bhairavi tells Prasanna that she has a daughter born out of wedlock whose father abandoned her. She shows him a photograph of the daughter, who is revealed to be Ranjani. Bhairavi explains that, fearing social disgrace, she initially considered abortion but instead raised Ranjani as her adopted daughter. After learning the truth from the household maids, Ranjani confronted Bhairavi, refused to remain with her as a daughter and left home.

Bhairavi and Mahendran initially reject Prasanna and Ranjani's proposals because of the age differences and their circumstances, but both eventually agree after being persuaded that the marriages can succeed. Prasanna abandons his revolutionary activities and becomes a mridangam player to satisfy Bhairavi. After she accepts his proposal, her former lover Pandiyan, Ranjani's father, arrives to apologise. Prasanna prevents him from meeting Bhairavi and takes him, who is dying of blood cancer, for treatment. He tells Pandiyan of his intention to marry Bhairavi, and Pandiyan agrees not to see her.

Mahendran, having seen Bhairavi's advertisement seeking her missing daughter, visits her home and discovers Prasanna's photograph, realising their relationship. He subsequently advertises for his missing son. Bhairavi sees the advertisement and insists that Prasanna obtain Mahendran's consent. When they meet Mahendran, he introduces Ranjani as his future wife and, consequently, Prasanna's future mother. This creates a riddle in which Ranjani would become her own mother's mother-in-law and Mahendran his own son's son-in-law.

At Bhairavi's next katcheri, where Prasanna accompanies her on mridangam, she sings "Kelviyin Nayagane, Indha Kelvikku Badhil Edhayya?" (Oh hero of the question, what is the answer to this question?). Ranjani changes her mind and joins Bhairavi in singing, prompting Prasanna to reconcile with Mahendran. During the concert, Pandiyan sends Bhairavi a note. After the performance, she finds him dead, holding a note wishing her happiness with Prasanna. She erases the kumkuma from her forehead, declaring herself a widow, and leaves with Ranjani, while Prasanna leaves with Mahendran.

== Cast ==
- Kamal Haasan as Prasanna
- Sundarrajan as Mahendran
- Srividya as M. R. Bhairavi
- Jayasudha as Ranjani
- Nagesh as Suri / Hari
- Rajinikanth as Pandiyan
- Thideer Kannaiah as Mahendran's friend

Kannadasan, Jaishankar and members of the Madras-based United Amateur Artistes make "friendly appearances".

== Production ==
=== Development ===
The Indian folktale collection Vetala Panchavimshati features many stories where the ghost-like being Vetala poses many riddles to Vikramaditya. In the final riddle, a king marries a woman and his son marries her mother; Vetala asks, "If these couples were to beget children, what would be their kinship relations?" and Vikramaditya keeps quiet since it does not have an answer. This riddle inspired K. Balachander to write the script of Apoorva Raagangal, which he would also direct. V. Govindarajan and J. Duraisamy produced the film under their production banner, Kalakendra Films. B. S. Lokanath was chosen as the cinematographer, N. R. Kittu as the editor, and Ramasamy as the art director. The film was launched in August 1974 at Vauhini Studios with A. V. Meiyappan switching on the camera.

Before the film's release, author N. R. Dasan accused Balachander of plagiarising Verum Mann, a story he had written for the magazine Kannadasan. The matter was taken to the Madras High Court, and Dasan won the case. Although Dasan did not seek money, the judge ordered Balachander to pay him ₹1,000 (equivalent to ₹28,000 or US$290 in 2023) as a fine.

=== Casting ===
Sometimes you aim for it. If you aim for it seriously, you succeed. Of course when I introduced him in Apoorva Raagangal, it was only a small role, but people would remember him because he comes in the climax [sic]. So I thought, I'll give this particular role to him.

— Balachander, on casting Rajinikanth

Kamal Haasan was cast as the protagonist Prasanna. He spent seven months learning to play the mridangam required for the role. The film was the debut of Shivaji Rao Gaekwad, who later became one of Tamil cinema's biggest stars, Rajinikanth. He was a student at the Madras Film Institute, when Balachander, who came there, met him. Balachander was impressed by his appearance: his "fragile" health, "powerful" eyes, "chiselled" face and dark skin and did not view them as negatives. He sought to "give him a good role, and see what can be drawn out of him". The script of Apoorva Raagangal had been readied, and Balachander wanted Gaekwad to play a "small but interesting part", which he agreed to. The part was that of Bhairavi's (Srividya) ex-lover Pandiyan.

As Gaekwad, who primarily spoke Kannada and his native Marathi, was only "tangentially familiar" with Tamil, Balachander advised him to learn the language. Gaekwad practised by speaking only Tamil with his friend Raja Bahaddur, a native Tamil speaker; he mastered the language in 20 days. After meeting Balachander again, and impressing him with his Tamil, he was given the part. When it came to giving Gaekwad a screen name, Balachander chose Rajinikanth, the name of A. V. M. Rajan's character from his 1966 film Major Chandrakanth; the name means "colour of night", referring to Gaekwad's skin colour, though it was misspelled in the credits as "Rajanikanth". The name Shivaji could not be chosen to avoid confusion with the actor Sivaji Ganesan.

=== Filming ===
Unlike many contemporaneous Tamil films, Apoorva Raagangal was shot entirely in actual houses for interiors without building sets, as Balachander wanted a more authentic narration to be conveyed. With Lokanath's help, he found houses which belonged to A. V. Meiyappan's family members, one of which was Meiyappan's house, Chettiar Bungalow. For Prasanna's look, Haasan kept his moustache thin and hair long, and had him sporting bell-bottoms and polo shirts. According to historian G. Dhananjayan, the song "Athisaya Raagam" was filmed at the cashew farms of VGP Golden Beach; however, Roshne Balasubramanian of The Indian Express says it was filmed at the Theosophical Society Adyar. The camera was moved manually by the cameraperson at this time, without the use of a dolly. In a 2000 interview with Rediff, Jayasudha, who portrayed Bhairavi's daughter Ranjani, recalled that it was hard portraying a girl in love with the much older Mahendran (Sundarrajan): "Balachander Sir was a very tough taskmaster. He would not be satisfied unless he got 100 per cent from you. He used to reprimand me and shout at me if I messed up." She also had to wear a sari and needed help since she had never worn one before.

The scene where Pandiyan opens the gate of Bhairavi's house was filmed at a house in 1st Crescent Park Road, Gandhi Nagar. The scene was shot on 27 March 1975, the same day that Balachander gave Rajinikanth his name; it was approved after only five or six takes. For the character's looks, Rajinikanth sported stubble and wore a loose-fitting suit consisting of a dusty coat, loosely worn tie, untucked shirt and trousers; his make-up was done by R. Sundaramoorthy. During the initial stages of principal photography, Rajinikanth found Balachander's directing methods very difficult to follow. Nagesh, who portrayed the doctor Suri who lives a double life as a drunkard named Hari, observed his difficulty and told him, "Don't get tensed up. Just imitate whatever Balachander is doing. That's what I'm doing as well!" After listening to Nagesh's advice, it became easier for Rajinikanth to complete his portions in the film. For the scene where Suri speaks to his own shadow, it was Nagesh's idea by making the character utter "Cheers" and throw the glass at his own shadow. The final reel length of the film was 3,949 metres (12,956 ft).

== Themes ==
Apoorva Raagangal explores the concept of relationships between couples with a large disparity in their ages, which challenged Indian social mores. Although it is based on a Vetala Panchavimshati riddle, it has frequently been compared to the American film 40 Carats (1973), which tells the story of a widow who falls in love with a much younger man. In Apoorva Raagangal, Ranjani often poses the riddle "Ennudaya appa yaarukku maamanaro, avarudaya marumagalin appa en maganukku maamanar. Appa avarukkum enakkum enna uravu?" (My father is father-in-law to someone; that person's daughter-in-law's father is my son's father-in-law. What is the relationship between him and me?), summing up the film's theme. While the source riddle in Vetala Panchavimshati does not have an answer, G. Dhananjayan believes the answer to the film's riddle is, "for a husband, the relation is his wife and for the wife, the relation is her husband".

Because one of the lead characters is a Carnatic singer, the film uses various Carnatic music terms as placeholders to carry forward the narrative. The first is "sarali varisai", referring to the beginner lessons that Carnatic music students learn; "mohanam", meaning enchantment or infatuation, appears when Prasanna falls in love; and the film ends with "mangalam", referring to the closing part of a katcheri. The female lead characters are named after the Carnatic ragas Bhairavi and Ranjani. V. Ramji of the Hindu Tamil Thisai believes the scene where Prasanna beats up a man for not standing still when "Jana Gana Mana" (the Indian national anthem) is playing, reflects Balachander's penchant for depicting patriotism. During Pandiyan's first appearance, "Sruthi Bedham" (Change of Sruthi) appears. Historian Mohan Raman said that by including these words, Balachander "meant that the man who changed the course of the story would also the change the industry". Anand Kumar RS, of The News Minute, however, says the term which also means "pitch distortion", was used to symbolise Pandiyan making "an entry at the wrong time".

Balachander said Pandiyan's first shot was deliberate and representative of Rajinikanth making his first appearance in cinema. According to critic Naman Ramachandran, the character is not entirely villainous despite popular belief since he commits no villainous act on screen. Having deserted Bhairavi after impregnating her offscreen, in the present he voluntarily agrees to stay away from her after realising she is content with Prasanna. Ramachandran said three things that happen soon after Pandiyan's death prove he is not a villain: the music playing in the background is the type usually played when a sympathetic character dies; Bhairavi erases her kumkuma, like any Indian woman would upon becoming a widow; and Pandiyan is found to be holding a note saying his last wish is to see the raga and tala meet, referring to the proposed joint performance of Bhairavi the singer and Prasanna the mridangam player. Dhananjayan considers the entire story of the film is conveyed through the song "Kelviyin Nayagane".

== Music ==
The film's soundtrack was composed by M. S. Viswanathan; the lyrics were written by Kannadasan. It was released as an LP on the His Master's Voice label. Two songs are ragamalikas, i.e. compositions having different verses set to different ragas. "Yezhu Swarangalukkul" is set in Panthuvarali, Kambhoji, Sindhu Bhairavi and Ranjani. "Athisaya Raagam" begins in Mahati, and shifts to Bhairavi with the line "Oru Puram Paarthaal". "Kelviyin Nayagane" is set in a single raga, Darbari Kanada.

Singer M. Balamuralikrishna recalled in a 2006 interview, "I ran into [M. S. Viswanathan] in AIR who was setting music for the movie. As the story revolved around strange relationships, the music director wanted to introduce new ragas to go with the ambient theme. I offered my `Mahati' scale and the records created then are history now." "Yezhu Swarangalukkul" became "the rage everywhere" and was a breakthrough for its singer Vani Jairam.

Track listing
No.	Title	Singer(s)	Length
1.	"Athisaya Raagam"	K. J. Yesudas	4:02
2.	"Kai Kotti Siripaargal"	Siyak Mohammed	3:05
3.	"Kelviyin Nayagane"	Vani Jairam, B. S. Sasirekha	7:25
4.	"Yezhu Swarangalukkul"	Vani Jairam	6:08
Total length:			20:40

== Release ==
Apoorva Raagangal was released on 15 August 1975, by Vijaya Films. When the film was released in Bangalore's Kapali theatre, Rajinikanth and Raja Bahaddur went to watch it. The latter recalled, "Nobody knew that he had acted in a film, We saw the film. When we came out, he started crying. I asked him, "Why are you crying?" He said, "I'm on the screen finally, I'm so happy. These are tears of joy". Despite being released on the same day as Sholay, which went on to become the highest-grossing Indian film at the time, Apoorva Raagangal became a box office success, completing a 100-day theatrical run. On its 100th day, Balachander held a ceremony in Madras to reward the cast and crew. The ceremony was attended by M. Karunanidhi, then the Chief Minister of Tamil Nadu.

=== Critical reception ===
Apoorva Raagangal received critical acclaim. On 22 August 1975, The Hindu said, "K. Balachander has contributed a unique story, dialogues and superb direction in Kala Kendra's [Apoorva Raagangal]. A film with a revolutionary offbeat theme it provides poetic experience". The reviewer praised the performances of the main cast, Nagesh's dual role performance as a doctor and a drunkard, and called Rajinikanth "dignified and impressive". They also appreciated the music and Vani Jairam's singing, and Lokanath's cinematography. The reviewer concluded, "Some of the most memorable scenes in this outstanding film emerge from the clash of personalities between the two odd pairs. The end should satisfy even conservative tastes and carries a subtle message about loving too well but not wisely." On 31 August, M. S. Udhayamurthy, writing for the Tamil magazine Ananda Vikatan, appreciated the film overwhelmingly for its quality, calling it one big musical concert happening before his eyes. He said he got so involved with the characters, to the point of forgetting they were artistes who were enacting their roles and started living with and empathising with them at the end. On the same day, Kanthan of Kalki praised the film for the screenplay and characters being innovative, along with the cast performances and music. Though some reviewers criticised Rajinikanth's performance and told him to improve, he complemented them over the reviewers praising his performance.

=== Accolades ===
Event	Award	Recipient	Ref.
23rd National Film Awards	Best Feature Film in Tamil	K. Balachander	
23rd National Film Awards	Best Cinematography	B. S. Lokanath	
23rd National Film Awards	Best Female Playback Singer	Vani Jairam	
23rd Filmfare Awards South	Best Film – Tamil	K. Balachander	
23rd Filmfare Awards South	Best Director – Tamil	K. Balachander	
23rd Filmfare Awards South	Best Actor – Tamil	Kamal Haasan	
23rd Filmfare Awards South	Filmfare Special Award – South	Srividya	

== Remakes ==
In 1976, Apoorva Raagangal was remade by Dasari Narayana Rao in Telugu as Thoorpu Padamara; Srividya and Nagesh reprised their roles. In 1984, the film was remade in Hindi as Ek Nai Paheli by Balachander himself, with Haasan reprising his role.

== Legacy ==
Apoorva Raagangal became a landmark in Tamil cinema, and a breakthrough for Srividya and Haasan. The Times of India wrote that it was "innovative for the way it brought out the O Henry sort of twist in the plot. [...] It was experimental in bringing out complexities involved in relationships and how certain relationships, no matter what, do not leave you and emerge abruptly to create new equations." Chitra Mahesh of The Hindu wrote that it "was bold and unapologetic about love transcending age, caste and all barriers one can think of". In 2011, after Balachander had been given the Dadasaheb Phalke Award, Pavithra Srinivasan of Rediff called the film one of his best and wrote, "Many filmmakers of that time would have hesitated to touch a subject like this, particularly at a time when relationships were still being gingerly tested on celluloid. But not K Balachander." The scene where a drunk Suri talks to his own shadow and hurls the empty glass at it while saying "Cheers" led to filmgoers imitating him and throwing cups on the lobby walls in theatres.

In 2003, Rediff wrote, "In an era where every other moviemaker claims to have come up with a daring, original, premise, this 28-year-old film is worth remembering. A trademark K Balachander film, this was the first to showcase Kamal's histrionic abilities." In 2015, Tamil Canadian journalist D. B. S. Jeyaraj wrote, "Though Nagesh has acted in many different roles in Balachander films, one sequence that is perhaps best remembered is the drunkard-doctor of [Apoorva Raagangal]." Director Mani Ratnam credited Balachander, with Mahendran and C. V. Sridhar, for "weaning the audience away from theatricality", citing a scene in Apoorva Raagangal as an example: "The shadow of the woman upstairs drying her hair falls across the path of the rebellious young man sneaking out of the house. It is enough to stop him. This scene could have been dramatic, with lot of dialogue. Instead you get a silent visual." The film was novelised in 2008 by Vikatan Prasuram.

Apoorva Raagangal has been referenced in other Rajinikanth films. In Athisaya Piravi (1990), Yama (Vinu Chakravarthy) has to restore Kaalai (Rajinikanth) to life by putting him in the body of a lookalike. He shows him numerous alternatives, one of which is Pandiyan from Apoorva Raagangal; Kaalai refuses after learning that Pandiyan is going to die of blood cancer. In Petta (2019), Kaali (Rajinikanth) opens the gates to a house in a scene that director Karthik Subbaraj confirmed was inspired by Pandiyan's first scene in Apoorva Raagangal.

== Bibliography ==
- Dhananjayan, G. (2011). The Best of Tamil Cinema, 1931 to 2010: 1931–1976. Galatta Media. OCLC 733724281.
- Rajadhyaksha, Ashish; Willemen, Paul (1998) [1994]. Encyclopaedia of Indian Cinema. British Film Institute and Oxford University Press. ISBN 0-19-563579-5.
- Ramachandran, Naman (2014) [2012]. Rajinikanth: The Definitive Biography. New Delhi: Penguin Books. ISBN 978-0-14-342111-5.
- Rajinikanth 12.12.12: A Birthday Special. Kasturi & Sons Ltd. 2012.
- Sundararaman (2007) [2005]. Raga Chintamani: A Guide to Carnatic Ragas Through Tamil Film Music (2nd ed.). Pichhamal Chintamani. OCLC 295034757.
