= Mooga Manasulu =

Indian film

- Theatrical release poster
- Directed by: Adurthi Subba Rao
- Written by: Acharya Aatreya; Mullapudi Venkata Ramana (story / dialogues)
- Screenplay by: Adurthi Subba Rao
- Produced by: C. Sundaram
- Starring: Akkineni Nageswara Rao; Savitri; Jamuna
- Cinematography: P. L. Roy
- Edited by: T. Krishna
- Music by: K. V. Mahadevan
- Production company: Babu Movies
- Distributed by: Sri Films
- Release date: 31 January 1964
- Running time: 160 mins
- Country: India
- Language: Telugu

Mooga Manasulu (transl. Mute Hearts) is a 1964 Indian Telugu-language romantic drama film directed by Adurthi Subba Rao who co-wrote the film with Acharya Aatreya and Mullapudi Venkata Ramana. The film stars Akkineni Nageswara Rao, Savitri and Jamuna, with music composed by K. V. Mahadevan. It is based on the concept of reincarnation.

Mooga Manasulu received the Certificate of Merit at the 11th National Film Awards, and the Filmfare Award for Best Film – Telugu at the 12th Filmfare Awards South. It was screened at the Karlovy Vary International Film Festival. The film was remade in Hindi as Milan (1967) directed by Subba Rao himself, and in Tamil as Praptham (1971) directed and produced by Savitri.

== Cast ==
- Akkineni Nageswara Rao as Gopinath
- Savitri as Radha
- Jamuna as Gowri
- Nagabhushanam as Rajendra
- Gummadi as Zamindar
- Padmanabham as Rambabu
- Allu Ramalingaiah as Appanna
- Suryakantham as Ramadevi
- Lakshmikanthamma as Avva

== Music ==
Mooga Manasulu

Film score by K. V. Mahadevan
- Released: 1964
- Genre: Soundtrack
- Length: 35:09
- Producer: K. V. Mahadevan

Music was composed by K. V. Mahadevan. All songs are evergreen blockbusters. Music released on Audio Company.

S. No.	Song title	Lyrics	Singers	length
1	"Eenaati Ee Bandhamenatido"	Acharya Aatreya	Ghantasala, P. Susheela	4:31
2	"Godari Gattundi"	Dasaradhi	P. Susheela	4:17
3	"Muddabanthi Puvvulo Moogakalla Oosulu"	Acharya Aatreya	Ghantasala	4:19
4	"Gowaramma Nee Mogudevaramma"	Kosaraju	Ghantasala, P. Susheela	5:16
5	"Naa Paata Nee Nota Palakala Chilaka"	Acharya Aatreya	Ghantasala, P. Susheela	5:20
6	"Paadutha Teeyaga Challaga"	Acharya Aatreya	Ghantasala	4:38
7	"Mukku Meeda Kopam"	Acharya Aatreya	Jamuna Rani	3:19
8	"Maanu Maakunu Gaanu"	Acharya Aatreya	P. Susheela	3:29

== Awards ==
- National Film Award for Best Feature Film in Telugu - Certificate of Merit
- Filmfare Best Film Award (Telugu) (1964)
