= Filmfare Award Best Costume Designer - South =

Indian annual film award

The Filmfare Award for Best Costume Designer is given by the Filmfare magazine as part of its annual Filmfare Awards South for films in South Indian languages.

The award was first given in 2010. Here is a list of the award winners and the films for which they won.

Year	Costume Designer	Film	Language
2010	Manish Malhotra	Enthiran	Tamil

== See also ==
- Filmfare Awards South
