= 11th Filmfare Awards South =

Award ceremony for South Indian films

- Date: June 17, 1964
- Site: Bombay

The 11th Filmfare Awards South ceremony honoring the winners of the best of South Indian cinema in 1963 was an event held on June 17, 1964.

The awards were introduced in 1954, around the films released in 1953. Filmfare Awards initially recognized only the Hindi film industry. In 1964, the awards extended to Best Picture in Telugu, Tamil, Bengali, and Marathi.

== Jury ==
Tamil & Telugu
- P. V. Rajamannar - Chairperson
- B. N. Reddy
- A. L. Srinivasan
- Sarojini Varadappan

== Awards ==
Best Tamil Film	Best Telugu Film
Naanum Oru Penn - AVM Productions	Narthanasala - Rajyam Pictures
