= Filmfare Award for Best Film – Telugu =

Indian annual film award

- Awarded for: Best Telugu film of the year
- Country: India
- Presented by: Filmfare
- First award: 17 June 1964; 62 years ago (for films released around 1963)
- Currently held by: Pushpa 2: The Rule (2024)

The Filmfare Award for Best Film – Telugu is an award given in India by the Filmfare magazine as part of its annual Filmfare Awards South for Telugu films. The award was first given in 1964 for films released around 1963. This award goes to the producers of the film.

== Winners and nominees ==
Before the year 2000 there are no nominations for the category. The panel of judges, jury members have directly selected the best film.

Table key
Indicates the winner

=== 1960s ===
Year of film release	Film	Producer(s)	Ref.
1963	Narthanasala	Lakshmi Rajyam and Sridhar Rao	
1964	Mooga Manasulu	C. Sundaram	
1965	Antastulu	V. B. Rajendra Prasad	
1966	Aastiparulu	V. B. Rajendra Prasad	
1967	Chadarangam	Badeti Satyanarayana and Putla Venkata Rao (Producers); S. V. Ranga Rao (Director)	
1968	Sudigundalu	Adurthi Subba Rao and Akkineni Nageswara Rao	
1969	Bangaru Panjaram	B. N. Reddy	

=== 1970s ===
Year of film release	Film	Producer(s)	Ref.
1970	Dharma Daata	Tammareddy Krishna Murthy	
1971	Tahsildar Gari Ammayi	N. V. V. Sathya Narayana and A. Surya Narayana	
1972	Pandanti Kapuram	G. Hanumantha Rao	
1973	Jeevana Tharangaalu	D. Ramanaidu	
1974	O Seeta Katha	Sharma	
1975	Jeevana Jyothi	D. V. S. Raju	
1976	Soggadu	D. Ramanaidu	
1977	Adavi Ramudu	N. V. V. Sathya Narayana and A. Surya Narayana	
1978	Manavoori Pandavulu	Jayakrishna	
1979	Gorintaku	K. Murari	

=== 1980s ===
Year of film release	Film	Producer(s)	Ref.
1980	Maa Bhoomi	B. Narsing Rao and G. Ravindranath	
1981	Saptapadi	P. Butchi Reddy	
1982	Meghasandesam	Dasari Narayana Rao	
1983	Neti Bharatam	P. Venkateswara Rao	
1984	Swathi	Kranthi Kumar	
1985	Pratighatana	Ramoji Rao and Atluri Rama Rao	
1986	Repati Pourulu	P. Venkateswara Rao	
1987	Padamati Sandhya Ragam	G. Subba Rao	
1988	Swarnakamalam	Ch. V. Appa Rao	
1989	Siva	Akkineni Venkat and Yarlagadda Surendra	

=== 1990s ===
Year of film release	Film	Producer(s)	Ref.
1990	Karthavyam	A. M. Rathnam	
1991	Seetharamaiah Gari Manavaralu	V. Doraiswamy Raju	
1992	Gharana Mogudu	K. Devi Varaprasad	
1993	Mathru Devo Bhava	K. S. Rama Rao	
1994	Aame	Mullapudi Brahmanandam	
1995	Subha Sankalpam	S. P. Balasubrahmanyam	
1996	Ninne Pelladata	Nagarjuna	
1997	Annamayya	V. Doraiswamy Raju	
1998	Anthapuram	P. Kiran	
1999	Raja	R. B. Choudary	

=== 2000s ===
Year of film release	Film	Producer(s)	Ref.
2000	Nuvve Kavali	Ramoji Rao	
2001	Nuvvu Nenu	P. Kiran	
2001	Kushi	A. M. Rathnam	
2001	Murari	N Devi Prasad, Ramalingeswara Rao and Gopi Nandigam	
2002	Santosham	K. L. Narayana	
2002	Indra	C. Aswini Dutt	
2002	Jayam	Teja	
2002	Manmadhudu	Nagarjuna	
2003	Okkadu	M. S. Raju	
2003	Aithe	Gangaraju Gunnam	
2003	Amma Nanna O Tamila Ammayi	K. L. N. Raju	
2003	Vasantam	N. V. Prasad and Sanam Naga Ashok Kumar	
2004	Varsham	M. S. Raju	
2004	Aa Naluguru	Sarita Patra	
2004	Anand	Sekhar Kammula	
2004	Arya	Dil Raju	
2005	Nuvvostanante Nenoddantana	M. S. Raju	
2005	Athadu	Duggirala Kishore and M. Ram Mohan	
2005	Chatrapathi	B. V. S. N. Prasad	
2005	Sankranti	R. B. Choudary	
2005	Super	Nagarjuna	
2006	Bommarillu	Dil Raju	
2006	Godavari	G. V. G. Raju	
2006	Pokiri	Puri Jagannadh and Manjula Ghattamaneni	
2006	Sri Ramadasu	Konda Krishnam Raju	
2007	Happy Days	Sekhar Kammula and Chandra S. Kammula	
2007	Desamuduru	D. V. V. Danayya	
2007	Dhee	Mallidi Satyanarayana Reddy	
2007	Tulasi	D. Suresh Babu	
2007	Yamadonga	Chiranjeevi Pedamallu and Urmila Gunnam	
2008	Gamyam	Saibabu Jagarlamudi	
2008	Ashta Chamma	Ram Mohan P.	
2008	Jalsa	Allu Aravind	
2008	Kotha Bangaru Lokam	Dil Raju	
2008	Parugu	Dil Raju	
2008	Ready	Sravanthi Ravi Kishore	
2009	Magadheera	Allu Aravind and B. V. S. N. Prasad	
2009	Arundhati	Shyam Prasad Reddy	
2009	Arya 2	Aditya Babu and B. V. S. N. Prasad	
2009	Konchem Ishtam Konchem Kashtam	Nallamalupu Bujji	

=== 2010s ===
Year of film release	Film	Producer(s)	Ref.
2010	Vedam	Shobu Yarlagadda and Prasad Devineni	
2010	Adhurs	Vallabhaneni Vamsi Mohan	
2010	Brindavanam	Dil Raju, Sirish and Laxman	
2010	Leader	M. Saravanan, M. S. Guhan, Aruna Guhan and Aparna Guhan	
2010	Simha	Paruchuri Kireeti	
2010	Ye Maaya Chesave	Manjula Ghattamaneni and Sanjay Swaroop	
2011	Dookudu	Ram Achanta, Gopichand Achanta and Anil Sunkara	
2011	100% Love	Bunny Vas	
2011	Mr. Perfect	Dil Raju	
2011	Rajanna	Nagarjuna	
2011	Sri Rama Rajyam	Yalamanchali Saibabu	
2012	Eega	Sai Korrapati	
2012	Businessman	R. R. Venkat	
2012	Gabbar Singh	Bandla Ganesh	
2012	Julayi	S. Radha Krishna	
2012	Racha	R. B. Choudary, N. V. Prasad and Paras Jain	
2013	Attarintiki Daredi	B. V. S. N. Prasad	
2013	Gunde Jaari Gallanthayyinde	N. Nikitha Reddy and Vikram Goud	
2013	Mirchi	V. Vamsi Krishna Reddy and Pramod Uppalapati	
2013	Seethamma Vakitlo Sirimalle Chettu	Dil Raju	
2013	Uyyala Jampala	Ram Mohan P. and Nagarjuna	
2014	Manam	Nagarjuna	
2014	Drushyam	D. Suresh Babu and Rajkumar Sethupathi	
2014	Karthikeya	Venkata Srinivas	
2014	Race Gurram	Nallamalupu Bujji and Venkateswara Rao	
2014	Run Raja Run	V. Vamsi Krishna Reddy and Pramod Uppalapati	
2015	Baahubali: The Beginning	Shobu Yarlagadda and Prasad Devineni	
2015	Bhale Bhale Magadivoy	V. Vamsi Krishna Reddy, Pramod Uppalapati and Bunny Vas	
2015	Kanche	Yeduguru Rajeev Reddy and Saibabu Jagarlamudi	
2015	Malli Malli Idi Rani Roju	K. A. Vallabha	
2015	Srimanthudu	Naveen Yerneni, Yalamanchili Ravi Shankar and Cherukuri Mohan	
2016	Pelli Choopulu	Raj Kandukuri and Yash Rangineni	
2016	A Aa	S. Radha Krishna	
2016	Dhruva	Allu Aravind and N. V. Prasad	
2016	Kshanam	Param V. Potluri and Kavin Anne	
2016	Nannaku Prematho	B. V. S. N. Prasad	
2016	Oopiri	Prasad V. Potluri and Kavin Anne	
2017	Baahubali 2: The Conclusion	Shobu Yarlagadda and Prasad Devineni	
2017	Arjun Reddy	Pranay Reddy Vanga	
2017	Fidaa	Dil Raju and Sirish	
2017	Gautamiputra Satakarni	Yeduguru Rajeev Reddy and Saibabu Jagarlamudi	
2017	Ghazi	Anvesh Reddy, Dil Raju, Prasad V. Potluri, NM Pasha and Jagan Mohan Vancha	
2017	Sathamanam Bhavati	Dil Raju	
2018	Mahanati	Swapna Dutt and Priyanka Dutt	
2018	Bharat Ane Nenu	D. V. V. Danayya	
2018	C/o Kancharapalem	Praveena Paruchuri	
2018	Geetha Govindam	Bunny Vas	
2018	Rangasthalam	Naveen Yerneni, Yalamanchili Ravi Shankar and Cherukuri Mohan	
2018	Sammohanam	Sivalenka Krishna Prasad	
2019	AWARDS FUNCTION WAS SUSPENDED DUE TO COVID-19 PANDEMIC		

=== 2020s ===
Year of film release	Film	Producer(s)	Ref.
2020–2021	Pushpa: The Rise	Naveen Yerneni and Yalamanchili Ravi Shankar	
2020–2021	Akhanda	Miryala Ravinder Reddy	
2020–2021	Ala Vaikunthapurramuloo	Allu Aravind and S. Radha Krishna	
2020–2021	Jathi Ratnalu	Nag Ashwin	
2020–2021	Love Story	Narayan Das K Narang and Puskur Ram Mohan Rao	
2020–2021	Palasa 1978	Dhyan Atluri	
2020–2021	Uppena	Naveen Yerneni and Yalamanchili Ravi Shankar	
2022	RRR	D. V. V. Danayya	
2022	Sita Ramam	C. Aswini Dutt	
2022	Major	Mahesh Babu, Namrata Shirodkar, Anurag Reddy and Sharath Chandra	
2022	Karthikeya 2	Abhishek Agarwal and T. G. Viswa Prasad	
2022	DJ Tillu	Suryadevara Naga Vamsi	
2022	Bimbisara	Kosaraju Harikrishna and Nandamuri Kalyan Ram	
2023	Balagam	Hanshita Reddy and Harshith Reddy	
2023	Baby	Sreenivasa Kumar Naidu	
2023	Dasara	Sudhakar Cherukuri and Ramana Rao Rudrapati	
2023	Hi Nanna	Nagendra Kasi and Vamshi Bommena	
2023	Miss Shetty Mr Polishetty	V. Vamsi Krishna Reddy and Pramod Uppalapati	
2023	Samajavaragamana	Razesh Danda	
2023	Salaar: Part 1 – Ceasefire	Vijay Kiragandur	
2024	Pushpa 2: The Rule	Naveen Yerneni and Yalamanchili Ravi Shankar	
2024	Kalki 2898 AD	C. Aswini Dutt	
2024	35 Chinna Katha Kaadu	Srujan Yarabolu and Siddharth Rallapalli	
2024	Lucky Baskhar	Suryadevara Naga Vamsi and Sai Soujanya	
2024	Hanu-Man	K. Niranjan Reddy	
2024	Committee Kurrollu	Padmaja Konidela and Jayalakshmi Adapaka	

== Superlatives ==
=== Age superlatives ===
Record	Producer	Film	Age	Year of event
Oldest winner	D. V. V. Danayya	RRR	63	2024
Oldest nominee	C. Aswini Dutt	Kalki 2898 AD	75	2026

=== Other superlatives ===
Superlative	Producer	Record
Most consecutive wins	M. S. Raju	3 (2003–2005)
Most consecutive nominations	M. S. Raju	3 (2003–2005)
Most nominations without a win	Pramod Uppalapati	4
Most nominations without a win	V. Vamsi Krishna Reddy	4
Most nominations in a single year	Dil Raju	3 (2017)

== Individuals with multiple wins ==
3 wins

- Prasad Devineni
- M. S. Raju
- Shobu Yarlagadda

2 wins

- V. Doraiswamy Raju
- P. Kiran
- Nagarjuna
- Naveen Yerneni
- B. V. S. N. Prasad
- V. B. Rajendra Prasad
- D. Ramanaidu
- Ramoji Rao
- Yalamanchili Ravi Shankar
- N. V. V. Sathya Narayana
- A. Surya Narayana
- P. Venkateswara Rao

== Individuals with multiple nominations ==
Since there are no nominations until the 48th edition (2000), the below list is based on the nominations starting from the 49th edition (2001).

9 nominations

- Dil Raju

5 nominations

- Nagarjuna
- B. V. S. N. Prasad
- Naveen Yerneni
- Yalamanchili Ravi Shankar

4 nominations

- Allu Aravind
- Pramod Uppalapati
- V. Vamsi Krishna Reddy

3 nominations

- C. Aswini Dutt
- Bunny Vas
- D. V. V. Danayya
- N. V. Prasad
- Prasad Devineni
- S. Radha Krishna
- M. S. Raju
- Saibabu Jagarlamudi
- Shobu Yarlagadda

2 nominations

- Nallamalupu Bujji
- Cherukuri Mohan
- R. B. Choudary
- Kavin Anne
- Manjula Ghattamaneni
- Suryadevara Naga Vamsi
- Prasad V. Potluri
- Ram Mohan P.
- Sekhar Kammula
- Sirish
- D. Suresh Babu
- Yeduguru Rajeev Reddy

== Notes ==
- ‘Film News', Anandan (2004). Sadhanaigal Padaitha Thamizh Thiraipada Varalaru (Tamil Film History and Its Achievements). Sivagami Publications. p. 738.
- Collections. Update Video Publication. 1991.
- The Times of India directory and year book including who's who. Times of India Press. 1984.
