= 12th Filmfare Awards South =

Award ceremony for South Indian films

- Date: 1965
- Site: Bombay

The 12th Filmfare Awards South ceremony honoring the winners of the best of South Indian cinema in 1964 took place in 1965.

The awards were introduced in 1954, around the films released in 1953. Filmfare Awards initially recognizing the Hindi film industries. In 1964 Awards extended to Best Picture in Tamil, Telugu, Bengali & Marathi.

== Awards ==
Best Tamil Film	Best Telugu Film
Server Sundaram - AVM Productions	Mooga Manasulu - C. Sundaram
