= Filmfare Award for Best VFX – South =

Movie award

The Filmfare Award for Best VFX is given by the Filmfare magazine as part of its annual Filmfare Awards for South Indian films.

The award was first given in 2012.

Year	VFX	Film	Language
2012	Pete Draper	Eega	Telugu

== See also ==
- Filmfare Awards South
