= 64th Filmfare Awards South =

Award ceremony for South Indian films

- Date: 17 June 2017
- Hosted by: Allu Sirish, Vijay Deverakonda, Ragini Dwivedi
- Produced by: Jio
- Official website: Hyderabad, Telangana, India

Highlights
- Best Picture: Maheshinte Prathikaaram (Malayalam), Thithi (Kannada), Pelli Choopulu (Telugu), Joker (Tamil)
- Most awards: Kirik Party (Kannada), 5 Godhi Banna Sadharana Mykattu (Kannada), 3 Maheshinte Prathikaaram (Malayalam), 3 Irudhi Suttru and Achcham Yenbadhu Madamaiyada(Tamil), 3 Nannaku Prematho (Telugu), 3
- Most nominations: Theri (Tamil), 9 Maheshinte Prathikaaram (Malayalam), 8 Kabali (Tamil), 8 Nannaku Prematho (Telugu), 7; 24 (Tamil), 7 A Aa (Telugu), 7 Kirik Party (Kannada), 7

The 64th Filmfare Awards South ceremony honoring the winners and nominees of the best of South Indian cinema in 2016 is an event that was held on 17 June 2017 at Novotel and HICC Complex in Hyderabad. The nominations for all the main awards were declared on 8 June 2017.

== List of winners and nominees ==
=== Main awards ===
The winners are listed first, highlighted in boldface.

==== Kannada cinema ====
Best Film	Best Director
**Thithi**; Godhi Banna Sadharana Mykattu; Last Bus; Rama Rama Re...; U Turn	**Rishab Shetty**- **Kirik Party**; Hemanth Rao – Godhi Banna Sadharana Mykattu; Narendra Babu – Santheyalli Nintha Kabira; Pawan Kumar – U Turn; Sumana Kittur – Kiragoorina Gayyaligalu
Best Actor	Best Actress
**Ananth Nag** – **Godhi Banna Sadharana Mykattu**; Puneeth Rajkumar – Doddmane Hudga; Rakshit Shetty – Kirik Party; Shiva Rajkumar – Santheyalli Nintha Kabira; Sudeep – Kotigobba 2	**Shraddha Srinath** – **U Turn**; Hariprriya – Neer Dose; Parul Yadav – Killing Veerappan; Shwetha Srivatsav – Kiragoorina Gayyaligalu; Sruthi Hariharan – Godhi Banna Sadharana Mykattu
Best Supporting Actor	Best Supporting Actress
**Vasishta N. Simha** – **Godhi Banna Sadharana Mykattu**; Achyuth Kumar – Kiragoorina Gayyaligalu; H. G. Dattatreya – Neer Dose; Roger Narayan – U Turn; Sadhu Kokila – Zoom	**Samyuktha Hegde** – **Kirik Party**; Aindrita Ray – Niruttara; Meghashree Bhagavatar – Last Bus; Sonu Gowda – Kiragoorina Gayyaligalu; Suman Ranganathan – Neer Dose
Best Music Director	Best Lyricist
**Ajaneesh Lokanath** – **Kirik Party**; Anoop Seelin – Neer Dose; Arjun Janya – Mungaru Male 2; Charan Raj – Godhi Banna Sadharana Mykattu; V. Harikrishna – Doddmane Hudga	**Jayant Kaikini** – "Sariyagi Nenapide" from **Mungaru Male 2**; Kaviraj – "Bhoomi Bhaanu" from Maduveya Mamatheya Kareyole; Rakshit Shetty – "Katheyondu Helide" from Kirik Party; V. Nagendra Prasad – "Neene Raama" from Mukunda Murari; Yogaraj Bhat – "Haalu Kudida Makkale" from Dana Kayonu
Best Playback Singer – Male	Best Playback Singer – Female
**Vijay Prakash** – "Belageddu Yara Mukhava" from **Kirik Party**; Anoop Seelin – "Alla Alla" from Nataraja Service; Puneeth Rajkumar – "Jhanak Jhanak" from Run Antony; Santhosh Venky – "Mandara Mandara" from Jai Maruthi 800; Shankar Mahadevan – "Neene Raama" from Mukunda Murari	**Ananya Bhat** – "Namma Kayo Devare" from **Rama Rama Re...**; Anuradha Bhat – "Yavoora Geleya" from Ricky; Indu Nagaraj – "Thraas Akkathi" from Doddmane Hudga; Shreya Ghoshal – "Neenire Saniha" from Kirik Party; Vani Harikrishna – "Neenaagi Helalilla" from Happy Birthday
Critics Best Actor	Critics Best Actress
**Rakshit Shetty – Kirik Party**	**Sruthi Hariharan – Godhi Banna Sadharana Mykattu**

==== Malayalam cinema ====
Best Film	Best Director
**Maheshinte Prathikaaram**; Action Hero Biju; Kammatipaadam; Puli Murugan; Oppam	**Dileesh Pothan** – **Maheshinte Prathikaaram**; Abrid Shine – Action Hero Biju; Priyadarshan – Oppam; Rajeev Ravi – Kammatipaadam; Sameer Thahir – Kali; Sanal Kumar Sasidharan- Ozhivudivasathe Kali
Best Actor	Best Actress
**Nivin Pauly** – **Action Hero Biju**; Dulquer Salman – Kali; Fahadh Faasil – Maheshinte Prathikaaram; Mohanlal – Oppam; Prithviraj Sukumaran – Pavada	**Nayanthara** – **Puthiya Niyamam**; Manju Warrier – Karinkunnam 6'S; Rajisha Vijayan – Anuraga Karikkin Vellam; Sai Pallavi – Kali; Shruthy Menon – Kismath
Best Supporting Actor	Best Supporting Actress
**Vinayakan** – **Kammatipaadam**; Alencier – Maheshinte Prathikaaram; Chemban Vinod Jose – Kali; Renji Panicker – Jacobinte Swargarajyam; Siddique – Annmariya Kalippilaanu; Tovino Thomas – Guppy	**Asha Sarath** – **Anuraga Karikkin Vellam**; Abhija Sivakala – Ozhivudivasathe Kali; Aparna Balamurali – Maheshinte Prathikaaram; Lakshmi Ramakrishnan – Jacobinte Swargarajyam; Rohini – Guppy
Best Music Director	Best Lyricist
**Bijibal** – **Maheshinte Prathikaaram**; Gopi Sunder – Kali; Jerry Amaldev – Action Hero Biju; Shaan Rahman – Jacobinte Swargarajyam; Sushin Shyam – Kismath	**Madhu Vasudevan** – "Chinnamma" from **Oppam**; Anwar Ali – "Para Para" from Kammatipaadam; Anwar Ali – "Kissa Paathiyil" from Kismath; B. K. Harinarayanan – "Minnungum" from Oppam; Manu Manjith – "Raavu Mayame" from Vettah; Rafeeq Ahamed – "Idukki" from Maheshinte Prathikaaram
Best Playback Singer – Male	Best Playback Singer – Female
**M. G. Sreekumar** – "Chinnamma" from **Oppam**; Bijibal – "Idukki" from Maheshinte Prathikaaram; Job Kurian – "Chillurandhal" from Kali; Karthik – "Mazhaye" from James & Alice; Sooraj Santhosh – "Thaniye" from Guppy	**Chinmayi** – "Oonjalil Aadi" from **Action Hero Biju**; Divya S. Menon – "Varthinkale" from Kali; Rinu Razak – "Raavu Mayave" from Vettah; Shweta Mohan – "Oruvela" from White; Varsha Vinu – "Melle Vannupoyi" from Marupadi
Critics Best Actor	Critics Best Actress
**Dulquer Salmaan – Kali & Kammatipaadam**	**Shruthy Menon – Kismath**

==== Tamil cinema ====
Best Film	Best Director
**Joker**; Achcham Yenbadhu Madamaiyada; Irudhi Suttru; Kabali; Theri; Visaranai	**Sudha Kongara** – **Irudhi Suttru**; Atlee – Theri; Gautham Vasudev Menon – Achcham Yenbadhu Madamaiyada; Pa. Ranjith – Kabali; Raju Murugan – Joker; Vetrimaran – Visaranai
Best Actor	Best Actress
**Madhavan – Irudhi Suttru**; Dhanush – Kodi; Rajinikanth – Kabali; Suriya – 24; Vijay – Theri; Vikram – Iru Mugan	**Ritika Singh** – **Irudhi Suttru**; Nayantara – Iru Mugan; Samantha Ruth Prabhu – 24; Samantha Ruth Prabhu – Theri; Tamannaah Bhatia – Devi; Trisha Krishnan – Kodi
Best Supporting Actor	Best Supporting Actress
**Samuthirakani** – **Visaranai**; Mahendran – Theri; Rajendran – Theri; Sathish – Remo; Sathish Krishnan – Achcham Yenbadhu Madamaiyada	**Baby Nainika -Theri**; Aishwarya Rajesh – Dharmadurai; Anupama Parameswaran – Kodi; Nithya Menon – 24; Radhika – Theri; Saranya Ponvannan – Kodi
Best Music Director	Best Lyricist
**A. R. Rahman** – **Achcham Yenbadhu Madamaiyada**; A. R. Rahman – 24; Anirudh Ravichander – Remo; G. V. Prakash Kumar – Theri; Harris Jayaraj – Iru Mugan; Santhosh Narayanan – Kabali	**Thamarai** – "Thalli Pogathey" from **Achcham Yenbadhu Madamaiyada**; Arunraja Kamaraj – "Neruppu Da" from Kabali; Madhan Karky – "Naan Un Azhaginile" from 24; Vairamuthu – "Endha Pakkam" from Dharmadurai; Vivek – "En Suzhali" from Kodi
Best Playback Singer – Male	Best Playback Singer – Female
**Sundarayyar** – "Jasmine U" from **Joker**; Anirudh Ravichander – "Senjittaley" from Remo; Arunraja Kamaraj – "Neruppu Da" from Kabali; Jithin Raj – "Yedho Mayam" from Wagah; Sid Sriram – "Mei Nigara" from 24	**Swetha Mohan** – "Maya Nadhi" from **Kabali**; Chinmayi – "Naan Un" from 24; K. S. Chithra – "Konji Pesida Venam" from Sethupathi; Mahalakshmi Iyer – "Un Maele Oru Kannu" from Rajini Murugan; Neeti Mohan – "Chella Kutti" from Theri
Critics Best Actor	Critics Best Actress
**Suriya – 24**	**Trisha – Kodi**

==== Telugu cinema ====
Best Film	Best Director
**Pelli Choopulu**; A Aa; Dhruva; Nannaku Prematho; Kshanam; Oopiri	**Vamsi Paidipally** – **Oopiri**; Koratala Siva – Janatha Garage; Ravikanth Perepu – Kshanam; Sukumar – Nannaku Prematho; Tharun Bhascker Dhaassyam – Pelli Choopulu; Trivikram Srinivas – A Aa
Best Actor	Best Actress
**Jr. NTR** – **Nannaku Prematho**; Allu Arjun – Sarrainodu; Nani – Gentleman; Naga Chaitanya – Premam; Nagarjuna – Oopiri; Ram Charan – Dhruva	**Samantha Ruth Prabhu** – **A Aa**; Keerthy Suresh – Nenu Sailaja; Lavanya Tripathi – Soggade Chinni Nayana; Niveda Thomas – Gentleman; Rakul Preet Singh – Nannaku Prematho; Ritu Varma – Pelli Choopulu
Best Supporting Actor	Best Supporting Actress
**Jagapati Babu** – **Nannaku Prematho**; Arvind Swamy – Dhruva; Karthi – Oopiri; Mohanlal – Janatha Garage; Rao Ramesh – A Aa; Sathyaraj – Nenu Sailaja	**Nandita Swetha** – **Ekkadiki Pothavu Chinnavada**; Anasuya Bharadwaj – Kshanam; Anupama Parameswaran – A Aa; Priyamani – Mana Oori Ramayanam; Ramya Krishna – Soggade Chinni Nayana
Best Music Director	Best Lyricist
**Devi Sri Prasad** – **Nannaku Prematho**; A. R. Rahman – Sahasam Swasaga Sagipo; Mickey J Meyer – A Aa; S. S. Thaman – Sarrainodu; Vivek Sagar – Pelli Choopulu	**Ramajogayya Sastry** – "Pranamam" from **Janatha Garage**; Anantha Sreeram – "Thaanu Nenu" from Sahasam Swasaga Sagipo; Bhaskarabhatla – "Oka Laalana" from Jyo Achyutananda; Krishnakanth – "Nuvvante Naa Nuvvu" from Krishna Gaadi Veera Prema Gaadha; Sirivennela Seetharama Sastry – "Oka Life from Oopiri
Best Playback Singer – Male	Best Playback Singer – Female
**Karthik** – "Yellipoke Shyamala" from **A Aa**; Dhanunjay – "You Are My MLA" from Sarrainodu; NTR Jr. – "Follow Follow" from Nannaku Prematho; Shankar Mahadevan – "Oka Laalana" from Jyo Achyutananda; Vijay Prakash – "Thanu Nenu" from Sahasam Swasaga Sagipo	**K. S. Chithra** – "Ee Premaki" from **Nenu Sailaja**; Amritavarshini K. C. – "Chinuku Taake" from Pelli Choopulu; Chinmayi – "Oye Meghamala" from Majnu; Padmalatha & Vishnupriya – "Pareshaanu Raa" from Dhruva; Ramya Behara & Anjana Sowmya – "Naidorintikada" from Brahmotsavam
Critics Best Actor	Critics Best Actress
**Allu Arjun – Sarrainodu**	**Ritu Varma – Pelli Choopulu**

=== Technical Awards ===
Best Cinematographer – South
- **Tirru (Tamil) –** **24**
- **P. S. Vinod (Telugu) –** **Oopiri**
Best Choreography
- **Sekhar (Telugu) –** **"Apple Beauty" from Janatha Garage**

=== Special awards ===
Lifetime Achievement
- **Vijaya Nirmala**
Best Male Debut
- **Shirish Saravanan** for Metro
Best Female Debut
- **Manjima Mohan for Achcham Yenbadhu Madamaiyada and Sahasam Swasaga Sagipo**
