= V. T. Arasu =

Singaporean journalist (1926–2008)

- Born: Vaidyanathan Thirunavukkarasu; 11 January 1926
- Died: 5 November 2008 (aged 82); Singapore
- Occupations: Journalist; Editor
- Agent: Tamil Murasu
- Spouse: Kasturi Thirunavukkarasu
- Children: Manickavasagam Thirunavukkarasu

Vaidyanathan Thirunavukkarasu (11 January 1926 – 5 November 2008), popularly known as V. T. Arasu, was a Singaporean journalist, civil servant, editor, author and Tamil enthusiast.

Arasu was born in India on 11 January 1926 and moved to Singapore in 1951. He was educated at the University of Madras and obtained a degree there. With five years of experience in journalism in India, he joined Tamil Murasu in Singapore, the then leading Tamil daily, as its sub-editor.

His pithy weekly and daily columns and catchy headlines attracted readers. In tandem with this portfolio, under the guidance of the community leader and editor G. Sarangapany, Arasu played a prominent role in the cultural and educational movements of the 1950s and 1960s. Notable among these activities were the management of Tamil schools, encouragement of creative writing, organization of the Tamizhar Tirunaal and the campaign to establish the Tamil department at the university.

In the 1950s and 1960s, he played a significant role in developing the cultural and educational scene in various ways, such as encouraging creative writing.

Arasu left Tamil Murasu in 1958 to join the civil service but returned in 1989 as Chief Editor at the request of its owners, the G. Sarangapany family. There, he managed the community newspaper's operations and publication.

Arasu started by revamping the paper's content to make it more in-depth and local-based. He upgraded its design and computerised its production and plugged the distribution system into that of all the other language papers.

By the time he stepped down in 2000, Tamil Murasu had quadrupled its circulation and become a profitable paper. More importantly, by making Tamil Murasu a part of the Singapore Press Holdings, he ensured the continuity and growth of the Tamil daily for the foreseeable future. He was instrumental in securing the paper's survival.

== Arasu's Years in the Civil Service ==
Arasu joined the Civil Service as Information Officer (Tamil) at Ministry of Culture in 1958, when preparations were underway to make Tamil one of Singapore's four official languages. He played a crucial role in the production of various Tamil publications and current affairs publications.

He went on to take charge of several publications, including The Mirror and the Singapore Yearbook. He also headed the Singapore Government's Media Relations Department during his time there.

Subsequently, he served the Government in various capacities as editor of books at the Institute of national Language and Culture, editor of current affairs weeklies Kannottam ( Tamil) and the Mirror ( English) and several other publications of the Ministry of Culture. He co-authored and edited the best seller, Singapore, An Illustrated History 1941 - 1984. He was also one of the editors of Singapore Poetry -Asean Literatures. Arasu also served as head of the Singapore Government Media Relations Department and acted from time to time as Press Secretary to the Prime Minister.

== Contributions to the Community ==
As Chairman of the Hindu Advisory Board (1974–76), Arasu persuaded the Hindu community to abandon the age-old practice of open cremation by firewood and opt for closed cremation by gas. He also persuaded the Government to provide special facilities at the crematorium to perform Hindu funeral rites and ceremonies. Arasu also served as member of the Hindu Endowments Board for a few terms.

As President of the Tamil Language and Cultural Society, from 1984 to 1998, he invited young professionals to join the organization and encouraged them to play a greater role in the community. Tirukkural Vizha, which was his initiative, became a popular annual literary and family event. Under his guidance, the society produced four attractively illustrated Tamil story books for children from the ages 4 to 7. The Society's nationwide parental education programmes and its representation to the Parliamentary Select Committee on Group Representation Constituency are its other achievements.

Arasu also served as a trustee of Singapore Indian Development Association (SINDA) from 1991 to 2000.

He was the first chairman of the Tamil Language Council, a national organization set up to promote the wider usage of Tamil in Singapore.

He also served as one of the secretaries general of the International Association for Tamil Research since 1987 till the 2000s.

While Arasu's involvement with Indian community issues and promotion of Tamil extended throughout the last 50 years of his life, he also devoted considerable time and effort on matters of common interest to all Singaporeans. His work at the Preservation of Monuments Board (1975–1992) particularly as chairman of the Board's Research and Publicity Committee from 1979 is one example. He had also served as member of the National Archives and Oral History Board. and several other committees relating to arts and literature and social issues.

The Singapore government conferred on Arasu the Efficiency Medal in 1985 and the Public Service Medallion (PBM) in 1999. The National University of Singapore's Centre for the Arts honoured him for his services at the conference on “Tamil in the International Arena.” in January 2002

Arasu died at the age of 83, on 4.11.2008 from complications linked to pancreatic cancer.

He is survived by his wife, son and three grand children.
