= Filmfare Special Award – South =

Indian annual film award

The Filmfare Special Jury Award is given by the Filmfare Magazine as part of its annual Filmfare Awards South for South Indian films. It was decided at the 17th Annual Filmfare Awards and started from the 20th Annual Filmfare Awards, held in 1973. It acknowledges a special and unique performance and encourages artistes, filmmakers and musicians to break new ground in drama, direction, music and acting. From 2011, Critics Award for Best Actor Started irregularly. In 2015 Critics Award for Best Actor & Best Actress become regularly in all four language.

Year	Recipient(s)		Film	Language	Refs
1972	Jamuna	Actress	Pandanti Kapuram	Telugu	
1973	Vishnuvardhan M. G. Ramachandran	Actor Producer	Nagarahavu Ulagam Sutrum Valiban for Excellent Production Values	Kannada Tamil	
1974	K. R. Vijaya	Actress	Dheerga Sumangali	Tamil	
1974	Upasane	Film	Rashi Brothers	Kannada	
1975	Srividya Dasari Narayana Rao	Actress Director	Apoorva Raagangal Swargam Narakam & Balipeetam	Tamil Telugu	
1976	Jaya Prada Gummadi; Prem Nazir; K. G. George	Actress Actor; Actor; Director	Siri Siri Muvva & Anthuleni Katha Excellent performance in Jyothi; Various films Swapnadanam for Special Commendation Award	Telugu Telugu; Malayalam; Malayalam	
1977	Sridevi	Actress	16 Vayathinile	Tamil	
1978	Lakshmi	Actress	Oru Nadigai Natakam Parkiral & Panthulamma	Tamil & Telugu	
1983	Urvashi	Actress	Mundhanai Mudichu	Tamil	
1983	Revathi	Actress	Man Vasanai	Tamil	
1984	Vishnuvardhan	Actor	Bandhana	Kannada	
1985	Puneeth Rajkumar	Child Actor	Bettada Hoovu	Kannada	
1995	Akhil Akkineni	Child Actor	Sisindri	Telugu	
1998	Ramoji Rao	Producer	Contributions	Telugu	
1999	Vikram	Actor	Sethu	Tamil	
2000	Venkatesh	Actor	Kalisundam Raa	Telugu	
2003	K. Muralitharan V. Swaminathan G. Venugopal	Producer	Anbe Sivam	Tamil	
2005	Devi Sri Prasad Harris Jayaraj	Music directors	Nuvvostanante Nenoddantana Ghajini for outstanding background score	Telugu Tamil	
2006	Mammootty Chiranjeevi	Actors	Legends (Honorary Award)	Telugu Malayalam	
2009	Yuvan Shankar Raja Srinagar Kitty; Mohanlal; Yagna Shetty	Music director Actor; Actor; Actress	Oy! (for Outstanding Score) Savaari; Bhramaram; Eddelu Manjunatha	Telugu Kannada; Malayalam; Kannada	
2020-2021	Chiranjeevi Sarja (posthumous)	Actor	Special commendation for excellent acting potential done in his career	Kannada	
2024	Vikram Anand Ekarshi; Bhavana	Actor Director; Actress	Thangalaan (Outstanding Performance) Aattam (Breakthrough In Filmmaking); Cine Icon Award	Tamil Malayalam; Malayalam	

== See also ==
- Filmfare Awards South
