= Filmfare Award for Best Actor – Kannada =

Indian annual film award

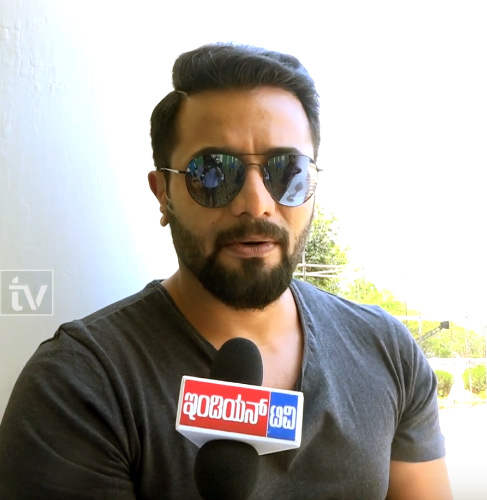
- The 2024 recipient: Sriimurali
- Awarded for: Best Performance by an Actor in a Leading Role
- Country: India
- Presented by: Filmfare
- First award: Venkata Rao Thalgeri for Vamsha Vriksha (1972)
- Currently held by: Sriimurali for Bagheera (2024)

Highlights
- Most awards: Dr. Rajkumar (8)
- Website: http://filmfareawards.indiatimes.com/

The Filmfare Award for Best Actor – Kannada is given by the Filmfare magazine as part of its annual Filmfare Awards South for Kannada films. The award was first given in 1972. As of 2026, Rajkumar has won the award a record 8 times, followed by Anant Nag with 6 wins.

== Superlatives ==
Multiple winners

- Rajkumar - 8 Awards
- Anant Nag - 6 Awards
- Vishnuvardhan, Shiva Rajkumar, Puneeth Rajkumar - 4 Awards
- Sudeepa - 3 Awards
- Lokesh, Ramesh Aravind, Ganesh, Prem, Yash - 2 Awards

Hattricks

- Rajkumar (1984, 1985, 1986)
- Anant Nag (1989, 1990, 1991)
- Sudeepa (2001, 2002, 2003)

== Winners ==
Year	Actor	Role(s)	Film	Ref
2024	Sriimurali	Vedanth Prabhakar / Bagheera	Bagheera	
2023	Rakshit Shetty	Manu	Sapta Sagaradaache Ello	
2022	Rishab Shetty	Shiva	Kantara	
2020–21	Dhananjaya	Shankar	Badava Rascal	
2019	AWARDS FUNCTION WAS SUSPENDED DUE TO COVID-19 PANDEMIC			
2018	Yash	Raja Krishnappa Bairya / Rocky	K.G.F: Chapter 1	
2017	Puneeth Rajkumar	Siddharth	Raajakumara	
2016	Anant Nag	Venkob Rao	Godhi Banna Sadharana Mykattu	
2015	Puneeth Rajkumar	Vikram (Note: Puneeth played double roles with same name.)	Rana Vikrama	
2014	Yash	Ramachari	Mr. and Mrs. Ramachari	
2013	Prem	Mohana	Charminar	
2012	Darshan	Sangolli Rayanna	Kranthiveera Sangolli Rayanna	
2011	Puneeth Rajkumar	Prabhu	Hudugaru	
2010	Shiva Rajkumar	Shankar	Thamassu	
2009	Ganesh	Preetham	Maleyali Jotheyali	
2008	Ganesh	Ganesh	Gaalipata	
2007	Duniya Vijay	Shivalingu	Duniya	
2006	Puneeth Rajkumar	Shivaraj Urs	Arasu	
2005	Prem	Kishore	Nenapirali	
2004	Vishnuvardhan	Dr. Vijay	Apthamitra	
2003	Sudeepa	Shivayya	Swathi Muthu	
2002	Sudeepa	Nandi	Nandhi	
2001	Sudeepa	Sacchidananda / Kiccha	Huchcha	
2000	Vishnuvardhan	• Shankara • Ganesha	Yajamana	
1999	Shiva Rajkumar	Ram	AK-47	
1998	Ramesh Aravind	Santosh	Hoomale	
1997	Ramesh Aravind	Abhishek Bhardwaj	Amrutha Varshini	
1996	Shiva Rajkumar	Manoj	Nammoora Mandara Hoove	
1995	Shiva Rajkumar	Sathya	Om	
1994	Vishnuvardhan	Siddartha	Haalunda Thavaru	
1993	Rajkumar	Murthy	Aakasmika	
1992	Charuhasan	Dr. Kubera	Kubi Matthu Iyala	
1991	Anant Nag	Lambodara	Gauri Ganesha	
1990	Anant Nag	Raghanna	Udbhava	
1989	Anant Nag	Anand Somavarpet	Hendthighelbedi	
1988	Vishnuvardhan	Vijay	Suprabhatha	
1987	Kamal Haasan	Unemployee	Pushpaka Vimana	
1986	Rajkumar	Panduranga	Bhagyada Lakshmi Baramma	
1985	Rajkumar	• Jagannath • Gopinath	Ade Kannu	
1984	Rajkumar	Kumar	Shravana Banthu	
1983	Girish Karnad	Narayana Sharma	Ananda Bhairavi	
1982	Anant Nag	Satish Chandra	Bara	
1981	Rajkumar	Inspector Shankar	Keralida Simha	
1980	Lokesh	Belya	Ellindalo Bandavaru	
1979	Anant Nag	Krishna	Naa Ninna Bidalaare	
1978	Rajkumar	• Shankar • Guru • Rajashekar	Shankar Guru	
1977	Maanu	Kalinge Gowda	Tabbaliyu Neenade Magane	
1976	Srinath	Venu	Besuge	
1975	Rajkumar	Mayurasharma	Mayura	
1974	Lokesh	Ayyu	Bhootayyana Maga Ayyu	
1973	Rajkumar	Kumar	Gandhada Gudi	
1972	Venkata Rao Thalgeri	Shrinivasa Shrothri	Vamsha Vriksha	
