= Filmfare Award for Best Director – Malayalam =

Annual Malayalam-language cinema award

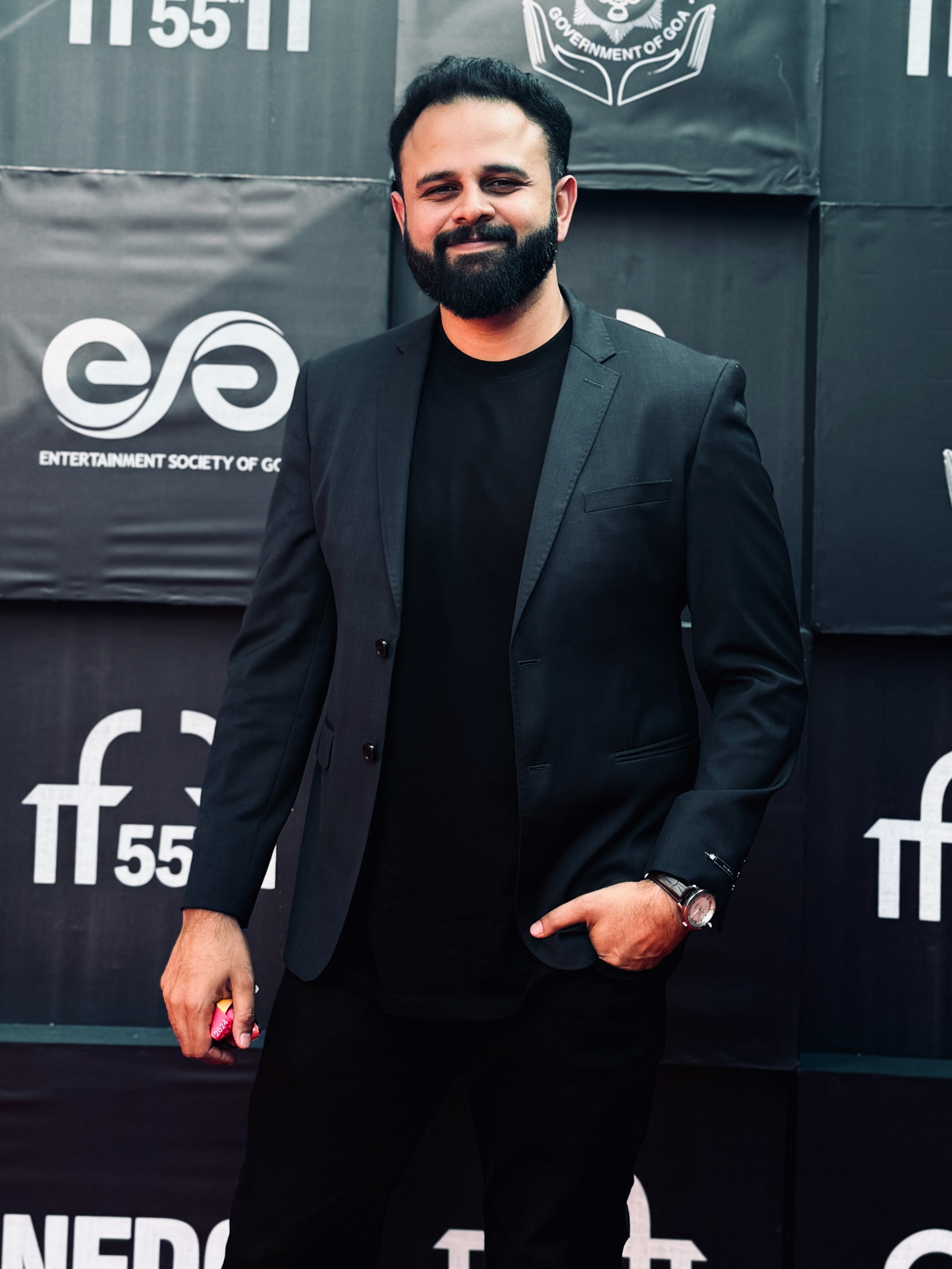
- The 2024 recipient: Rahul Sadasivan for Bramayugam
- Awarded for: Best Director in Malayalam Films
- Country: India
- Presented by: Filmfare
- Currently held by: Rahul Sadasivan for Bramayugam (2024)

Highlights
- Most awards: K. S. Sethumadhavan and Bharathan (4)

The Filmfare Award for Best Director – Malayalam is given by the Filmfare magazine as part of its annual Filmfare Awards South for Malayalam films. The Filmfare award for best director Malayalam has been given since 1972.

== Most wins ==
Record	Director(s)
4 awards	K. S. Sethumadhavan
4 awards	Bharathan

== Winners ==
Year	Director	Film(s)	Ref.
1972	K. S. Sethumadhavan	Punarjanmam	
1973	K. S. Sethumadhavan	Pani Theeratha Veedu	
1974	K. S. Sethumadhavan	Chattakari	
1975	Bharathan	Prayanam	
1976	Sreekumaran Thampi	Mohiniyattom	
1977	I. V. Sasi	Itha Ivide Vare	
1978	I. V. Sasi	Yaetta	
1979	Bharathan	Thakara	
1980	Bharathan	Chamaram	
1981	K. S. Sethumadhavan	Oppol	
1982	Balu Mahendra	Olangal	
1983	Balachandra Menon	Karyam Nissaram	
1984	Bharathan	Ithiri Poove Chuvannapoove	
1985	Balu Mahendra	Yathra	
1986	Hariharan	Panchagni	
1987	Pratap Pothan	Rithubhedam	
1988	Padmarajan	Aparan	
1989	Shaji N Karun	Piravi	
1990	Bhadran	Iyer The Great	
1991	Sibi Malayil	Bharatham	
1992	Sibi Malayil	Sadayam	
1993	Shaji Kailas	Ekalavyan	
1994	Hariharan	Parinayam	
1995	Bhadran	Spadikam	
1996	Sathyan Anthikad	Thooval Kottaram	
1997	Jayaraj	Kaliyattam	
1998	Sreenivasan	Chinthavishtayaya Shyamala	
1999	Shyamaprasad	Agnisakshi	
2000	Jayaraj	Karunam	
2001	Vinayan	Karumadikuttan	
2002	Lal Jose	Meesa Madhavan	
2003	Sathyan Anthikkad	Manassinakkare	
2004	Blessy	Kaazhcha	
2005	Blessy	Thanmatra	
2006	Roshan Andrews	Notebook	
2007	Babu Thiruvalla	Thaniye	
2008	Ranjith	Thirakkatha	
2009	Hariharan	Pazhassi Raja	
2010	Ranjith	Pranchiyettan & the Saint	
2011	Blessy	Pranayam	
2012	Lal Jose	Ayalum Njanum Thammil	
2013	Shyamaprasad	Artist	
2014	Anjali Menon	Bangalore Days	
2015	R. S. Vimal	Ennu Ninte Moideen	
2016	Dileesh Pothan	Maheshinte Prathikaaram	
2017	Dileesh Pothan	Thondimuthalum Driksakshiyum	
2018	Lijo Jose Pellissery	Ee.Ma.Yau	
2019	AWARDS FUNCTION WAS SUSPENDED DUE TO COVID-19 PANDEMIC		
2020–2021	Senna Hegde	Thinkalazhcha Nishchayam	
2022	Ratheesh Balakrishnan Poduval	Nna Thaan Case Kodu	
2023	Jude Anthany Joseph	2018	
2024	Rahul Sadasivan	Bramayugam	
