= Filmfare Award for Best Film – Kannada =

Annual award to the best Kannada film

- Awarded for: Best film in Kannada cinema
- Country: India
- Presented by: Filmfare
- First award: Namma Makkalu (1969)
- Currently held by: Shakhahaari (2024)

The Filmfare Award for Best Film – Kannada is given by the Filmfare magazine as part of its annual Filmfare Awards South for Kannada films. The award was first given in 1970 for films released in 1969.

== Winners ==
| Year | Film | Producer | Ref |
|---|---|---|---|
| 2024 | Shakhahaari | Rajesh Keelambi; Ranjini Prasanna |
| 2023 | Daredevil Musthafa | Tejaswi Fans Association |
| 2022 | Kantara | Vijay Kiragandur |
| 2020–21 | Act 1978 | Devaraj R |
| 2019 | AWARDS FUNCTION WAS SUSPENDED DUE TO COVID-19 PANDEMIC |
| 2018 | K.G.F: Chapter 1 | Vijay Kiragandur |
| 2017 | Ondu Motteya Kathe | • Suhan Prasad • Pawan Kumar |
| 2016 | Thithi | • Pratap Reddy • Sunmin Park |
| 2015 | RangiTaranga | H. K. Prakash |
| 2014 | Mr. and Mrs. Ramachari | • Jayanna • Bhogendra |
| 2013 | Myna | N. S. Rajkumar |
| 2012 | Krantiveera Sangolli Rayanna | Anand Appugol |
| 2011 | Olave Mandhara | B. Govinda Raju |
| 2010 | Jackie | Parvathamma Rajkumar |
| 2009 | Maleyali Jotheyali | Shilpa Ganesh |
| 2008 | Moggina Manasu | E. Krishnappa |
| 2007 | Aa Dinagalu | • Syed Aman • M. S. Raveendra |
| 2006 | Mungaru Male | E. Krishnappa |
| 2005 | Nenapirali | Ajay R. Gowda |
| 2004 | Apthamitra | Dwarakish |
| 2003 | Paris Pranaya | Tumkur Dayanand |
| 2002 | Dweepa | Soundarya |
| 2001 | Kothigalu Saar Kothigalu | Jai Jagadish |
| 2000 | Sparsha | Sarovar Sanjeev Rao |
| 1999 | Upendra | H. C. Srinivas |
| 1998 | Thaayi Saheba | Jayamala |
| 1997 | Amrutha Varshini | B. Jayashree Devi |
| 1996 | Janumada Jodi | Parvathamma Rajkumar |
| 1995 | Beladingala Baale | B. S. Murali |
| 1994 | Karulina Koogu | Vizag Raju ((Aditya Movie Makers)) |
| 1993 | Aakasmika | S. A. Govindaraju |
| 1992 | Mysore Mallige | Srihari Khoday |
| 1991 | Gauri Ganesha | Vishwasagar |
| 1990 | Prathama Ushakirana | A.Ashok Pal; Rajani Pal |
| 1989 | Sankranthi | • K S Sacchidananda • H B Dharmaraj |
| 1988 | Aasphota | V. Verghese |
| 1987 | Pushpaka Vimana | Shringar Nagaraj |
| 1986 | Bhagyada Lakshmi Baramma | Parvathamma Rajkumar |
| 1985 | Bettada Hoovu | Parvathamma Rajkumar |
| 1984 | Anubhava | G. Kashinath; G.Satyanarayana |
| 1983 | Phaniyamma | Prema Karanth |
| 1982 | Bara | M. S. Sathyu |
| 1981 | Ranganayaki | B. Thimmanna |
| 1980 | Ellindalo Bandavaru | Mohan Kumar Kondajji |
| 1979 | Dharmasere | Aarathi |
| 1978 | Ondanondu Kaladalli | Girish Karnad |
| 1977 | Tabbaliyu Neenade Magane | • B. M. Venkatesh • Chandulal Jain |
| 1976 | Thulasi | K. S. L. Swamy |
| 1975 | Chomana Dudi | Praja Films |
| 1974 | Kaadu | • K. N. Narayan • G. N. Lakshmipathy |
| 1973 | Naagarahaavu | N. Veeraswamy |
| 1972 | Vamsha Vriksha | G. V. Iyer |
| 1971 | Sharapanjara | C. S. Rajah |
| 1970 | Sri Krishna Devaraya | B. R. Panthulu |
| 1969 | Namma Makkalu | Harini |
