= Filmfare Award for Best Film – Malayalam =

Malayalam-language cinema award

- Awarded for: Best Malayalam Film
- Country: India
- Presented by: Filmfare
- First award: Chemmeen (1966)
- Currently held by: Manjummel Boys(2024)

The Filmfare Award for Best Film – Malayalam is given by the Filmfare magazine as part of its annual Filmfare Awards South. The award in this category for Malayalam films has been given since 1966.

== Winners ==
Year	Film	Recipient(s)	Ref.
2024	Manjummel Boys	Soubin Shahir, Babu Shahir and Shawn Antony	
2023	2018	Venu Kunnappilly, C. K. Padma Kumar and Anto Joseph	
2022	Nna Thaan Case Kodu	Santhosh T. Kuruvilla, Kunchacko Boban and Sheril Rachel Santhosh	
2020–2021	Ayyappanum Koshiyum	Ranjith	
2019	AWARDS FUNCTION WAS SUSPENDED DUE TO COVID-19 PANDEMIC		
2018	Sudani from Nigeria	Sameer Thahir and Shyju Khalid	
2017	Thondimuthalum Driksakshiyum	Sandip Senan and Anish M Thomas	
2016	Maheshinte Prathikaaram	Aashiq Abu	
2015	Pathemari	Allens Media	
2014	Munnariyippu	Ranjith	
2013	Drishyam	Antony Perumbavoor	
2012	Ayalum Njanum Thammil	Prem Prakash	
2011	Traffic	Listin Stephen	
2010	Pranchiyettan and the Saint	Renjith	
2009	Kerala Varma Pazhassi Raja	Gokulam Gopalan	
2008	Thirakkatha	Ranjith and Maha Subair	
2007	Kadha Parayumbol	Sreenivasan and Mukesh	
2006	Notebook	P. V. Gangadharan	
2005	Achuvinte Amma	P. V. Gangadharan	
2004	Kaazhcha	Noushad Xavy and Manoj Mathew	
2003	Manassinakkare	Maha Subair	
2002	Nandanam	Sideeq and Ranjith	
2001	Meghamalhar	M. V. Shreyams Kumar	
2000	Karunam	Jayaraj	
1999	Veendum Chila Veettukaryangal	P. V. Gangadharan	
1998	Chinthavishtayaya Shyamala	C. Karunakaran	
1997	Bhoothakkannadi	N.Krishnakumar	
1996	Thooval Kottaram	P. V. Gangadharan	
1995	Spadikam	R. Mohan	
1994	Sukrutham	M. M. Ramachandran	
1993	Vatsalyam	H.M.Basheer	
1992	Sargam	Bhavani Hariharan	
1991	Perumthachan	G. Jayakumar	
1990	Thazhvaram	V.B.K. Menon	
1989	Oru Vadakkan Veeragatha	P. V. Gangadharan	
1988	1921	Mohammed Mannil	
1987	Thaniyavarthanam	V. Nandakumar	
1986	Vartha	P. V. Gangadharan	
1985	Nirakkoottu	Joy Thomas	
1984	Aalkkoottathil Thaniye	Raju Mathew	
1983	Koodevide	Rajan Joseph	
1982	Ee Nadu	N. G. John	
1981	Thrishna	Rosamma George	
1980	Chamaram	Navodaya Appachan	
1979	Thakara	V. V. Babu	
1978	Rathinirvedam	Hari Pothan	
1977	Itha Ivide Vare	Hari Pothan	
1976	Mohiniyaattam	Raji, S. Thapsi and V .Somasekhar	
1975	Raagam	N. P. Ali	
1974	Nellu	N. P. Ali	
1973	Panitheeratha Veedu	K.S.R Murthy	
1972	Chembarathi	S. K. Nair	
1971	Aabhijathyam	R.S. Prabhu	
1970	Vaazhve Mayam	M. O. Joseph	
1969	Adimakal	M. O. Joseph	
1968	Thulabharam	Supriya Pictures	
1967	Agniputhri	Prem Nawaz	
1966	Chemmeen	Hasam Ismail	
