= Filmfare Award for Best Film – Tamil =

Indian annual film award

- Awarded for: Best Film in Tamil
- Country: India
- Presented by: Filmfare
- First award: Naanum Oru Penn (1963)
- Currently held by: Amaran (2024)
- Website: http://filmfareawards.indiatimes.com/

The Filmfare Award for Best Film – Tamil is given by the Filmfare magazine as part of its annual Filmfare Awards South for Tamil (Kollywood) films. The award was first given in 1963. Following is a list of the award winners and the films for which they won.

== Winners ==
Year	Film	Producer(s)	Ref
2024	Amaran	Kamal Haasan, R. Mahendran and Vivek Krishnani	
2023	Chithha	Siddharth	
2022	Ponniyin Selvan: I	Subaskaran Allirajah and Mani Ratnam	
2020–2021	Jai Bhim	Suriya and Jyothika	
2019	AWARDS FUNCTION WAS SUSPENDED DUE TO COVID-19 PANDEMIC		
2018	Pariyerum Perumal	Pa. Ranjith	
2017	Aramm	Kotapadi Ramesh	
2016	Joker	S. R. Prabhu and S. R. Prakashbabu	
2015	Kaaka Muttai	Dhanush and Vetrimaaran	
2014	Kaththi	K. Karunamoorthi, A. Subashkaran and A. R. Murugadoss	
2013	Thanga Meengal	Gautham Vasudev Menon, Reshma Ghatala and Venkat Somasundaram	
2012	Vazhakku Enn 18/9	N. Linguswamy	
2011	Aadukalam	Kathiresan	
2010	Mynaa	John Max	
2009	Naadodigal	S. Michael Rayappan	
2008	Subramaniyapuram	Sasikumar	
2007	Paruthiveeran	K. E. Gnanavelraja	
2006	Veyil	Shankar	
2005	Anniyan	Oscar Ravichandran	
2004	Autograph	Cheran	
2003	Pithamagan	V. A. Durai	
2002	Azhagi	D. Udhaya Kumar	
2001	Aanandham	R. B. Choudary	
2000	Kandukondain Kandukondain	Kalaipuli S. Thanu	
1999	Sethu	A. Kandasamy	
1998	Natpukaaga	A. M. Rathnam	
1997	Bharathi Kannamma	Henry	
1996	Indian	A. M. Rathnam	
1995	Bombay	S. Sriram	
1994	Karuththamma	Bharathiraja	
1993	Gentleman	K. T. Kunjumon	
1992	Roja	Rajam Balachander and Pushpa Kandaswamy	
1991	Chinna Thambi	K. Balu	
1990	Pudhu Vasantham	R. B. Choudary	
1989	Apoorva Sagodharargal	Kamal Haasan	
1988	Agni Natchathiram	G. Venkateswaran	
1987	Vedham Pudhithu	Bharathiraja	
1986	Samsaram Adhu Minsaram	M. Saravanan and M. Balasubramaniam	
1985	Sindhu Bhairavi	Rajam Balachander and V. Natarajan	
1984	Achamillai Achamillai	Rajam Balachander and V. Natarajan	
1983	Man Vasanai	Chitra Lakshmanan	
1982	Enkeyo Ketta Kural	Panchu Arunachalam	
1981	Thaneer Thaneer	P. R. Govindarajan Duraisamy	
1980	Varumayin Niram Sivappu	R. Venkatraman	
1979	Pasi	Durai	
1978	Mullum Malarum	Venu Chettiyar	
1977	Bhuvana Oru Kelvi Kuri	MAM Films	
1976	Annakili	P. Thamizharasi	
1975	Apoorva Raagangal	P. R. Govindarajan Duraisamy	
1974	Thikkatra Parvathi	Singeetham Srinivasa Rao	
1973	Bharatha Vilas	T. Bharathi	
1972	Pattikada Pattanama	P. Madhavan	
1971	Babu	A. C. Tirulokchandar	
1970	Engirundho Vandhaal	K. Balaji	
1969	Adimaippenn	M. G. Ramachandran	
1968	Lakshmi Kalyanam	A. L. Srinivasan	
1967	Karpooram	V. T. Arasu	
1966	Ramu	A. V. Meiyappan	
1965	Thiruvilayaadal	A. P. Nagarajan	
1964	Server Sundaram	Krishnan–Panju	
1963	Naanum Oru Penn	M. Murugan, M. Kumaran and M. Saravanan	

== Nominations ==
=== 1970s ===
- 1972 – Pattikada Pattanama
- 1973 – Bharatha Vilas
- 1974 – Dikkatra Parvathi
  - Aval Oru Thodar Kathai
  - Urimai Kural
- 1975 – Apoorva Raagangal
  - Anbe Aaruyire
  - Idhayakkani
- 1976 – Annakili
  - Chitra Pournami
  - Moondru Mudichu
  - Oru Oodhappu Kan Simittugiradhu
  - Thunive Thunai
- 1977 – Bhuvana Oru Kelvi Kuri
  - 16 Vayathinile
  - Aattukara Alamelu
  - Avargal
  - Sila Nerangalil Sila Manithargal
- 1978 – Mullum Malarum
  - Aval Appadithan
  - Ilamai Oonjal Aadukirathu
  - Kizhakke Pogum Rail
  - Sigappu Rojakkal
- 1979 – Pasi
  - Azhiyatha Kolangal
  - Ninaithale Inikkum
  - Puthiya Vaarpugal
  - Uthiri Pookkal

=== 1980s ===
- 1980 – Varumayin Niram Sigappu
  - Billa
  - Jhonny
  - Nenjathai Killathe
  - Vandichakkaram
- 1981 – Thaneer Thaneer
  - Raja Paarvai
  - Mouna Geethangal
- 1982 – Enkeyo Ketta Kural
  - Agni Sakshi
  - Gopurangal Saivathillai
  - Moondram Pirai
  - Payanangal Mudivathillai
- 1983 – Man Vasanai
  - Mundhanai Mudichu
  - Oru Odai Nadhiyagirathu
  - Thangaikkor Geetham
  - Vellai Roja
- 1984 – Achamillai Achamillai
  - Nallavanukku Nallavan
  - Nooravathu Naal
  - Pudhumai Penn
  - Sirai
- 1985 – Sindhu Bhairavi
  - Chinna Veedu
  - Muthal Mariyathai
  - Oru Kaidhiyin Diary
  - Poove Poochudava
- 1986 – Samsaram Adhu Minsaram
  - Amman Kovil Kizhakale
  - Kadalora Kavithaigal
  - Mouna Ragam
  - Punnagai Mannan
- 1987 – Vedham Pudhithu
  - Enga Chinna Rasa
  - Nayakan
  - Neethikku Thandanai
  - Rettai Vaal Kuruvi
- 1988 – Agni Natchathiram
  - En Bommukutty Ammavukku
  - Sathya
  - Unnal Mudiyum Thambi
  - Veedu
- 1989 – Apoorva Sagodharargal
  - Aararo Aariraro
  - Pudhea Paadhai
  - Pudhu Pudhu Arthangal
  - Varusham Padhinaaru

=== 1990s ===
- 1990 – Pudhu Vasantham
  - Anjali
  - En Uyir Thozhan
  - Keladi Kanmani
  - Kizhakku Vaasal
  - Michael Madana Kama Rajan
- 1991 – Chinna Thambi
  - Azhagan
  - En Rasavin Manasile
  - Gunaa
  - Thalapathi
- 1992 – Roja
  - Annaamalai
  - Chinna Gounder
  - Thevar Magan
  - Vaaname Ellai
  - Vanna Vanna Pookkal
- 1993 – Gentleman
  - Gokulam
  - Jathi Malli
  - Kizhakku Cheemayile
  - Marupadiyum
- 1994 – Karuthamma
  - Kaadhalan
  - Mahanadhi
  - Magalir Mattum
  - Nattamai
- 1995 – Bombay
  - Avatharam
  - Indira
  - Kolangal
  - Sathi Leelavathi
- 1996 – Indian
  - Anthimanthaarai
  - Kadhal Desam
  - Kadhal Kottai
  - Kalki
- 1997 – Bharathi Kannamma
  - Iruvar
  - Minsara Kanavu
  - Porkkalam
  - Suryavamsam
- 1998 – Natpukkaga
  - Desiya Geetham
  - Jeans
  - Maru Malarchi
  - Unnidathil Ennai Koduthen
- 1999 – Sethu
  - House Full
  - Mudhalvan
  - Padayappa
  - Thullatha Manamum Thullum

=== 2000s ===
- 2000 – Kandukondain Kandukondain
  - Alaipayuthey
  - Hey Ram
  - Kushi
  - Mugavaree
  - Vaanathaipola
- 2001 – Aanandham
  - Friends
  - Kasi
  - Nandha
  - Pandavar Bhoomi
- 2002 – Azhagi
  - Kannathil Muthamittal
  - Panchatanthiram
  - Ramanaa
  - Unnai Ninaithu
- 2003 – Pithamagan
  - Anbe Sivam
  - Dhool
  - Kaakha Kaakha
  - Kadhal Kondein
  - Saamy
- 2004 – Autograph
  - Aayutha Ezhuthu
  - Ghilli
  - Kaadhal
  - M. Kumaran S/O Mahalakshmi
- 2005 – Anniyan
  - Ayya
  - Chandramukhi
  - Ghajini
  - Thavamai Thavamirundhu
- 2006 – Veyyil
  - Chithiram Pesuthadi
  - E
  - Em Magan
  - Thiruttu Payale
- 2007 – Paruthiveeran
  - Billa
  - Mozhi
  - Pokkiri
  - Sivaji
- 2008 – Subramaniyapuram
  - Anjathe
  - Dasavathaaram
  - Santosh Subramaniam
  - Vaaranam Aayiram
  - Yaaradi Nee Mohini
- 2009 – Naadodigal
  - Ayan
  - Kanchivaram
  - Naan Kadavul
  - Pasanga
  - Peraanmai

=== 2010s ===
- 2010 – Mynaa
  - Aayirathil Oruvan
  - Angadi Theru
  - Enthiran
  - Madrasapattinam
  - Vinnaithaandi Varuvaayaa
- 2011 – Aadukalam
  - 7 Aum Arivu
  - Deiva Thirumagal
  - Ko
  - Mankatha
- 2012 – Vazhakku Enn 18/9
  - Kumki
  - Neerparavai
  - Sundarapandian
  - Thuppakki
- 2013 – Thanga Meengal
  - Haridas
  - Paradesi
  - Singam 2
  - Thalaimuraigal
  - Vishwaroopam
- 2014 – Kaththi
  - Kaaviya Thalaivan
  - Madras
  - Mundasupatti
  - Velaiyilla Pattathari
- 2015 – Kaaka Muttai
  - 36 Vayathinile
  - I
  - OK Kanmani
  - Papanasam
  - Thani Oruvan
- 2016 – Joker
  - Achcham Yenbadhu Madamaiyada
  - Irudhi Suttru
  - Kabali
  - Theri
  - Visaranai
- 2017 – Aramm
  - Aruvi
  - Taramani
  - Theeran Adhigaram Ondru
  - Vikram Vedha
- 2018 – Pariyerum Perumal
  - 96
  - Chekka Chivantha Vaanam
  - Ratsasan
  - Sarkar
  - Vada Chennai

=== 2020s ===
- 2020–2021 – Jai Bhim
  - Ka Pae Ranasingam
  - Kannum Kannum Kollaiyadithaal
  - Karnan
  - Mandela
  - Sarpatta Parambarai
  - Soorarai Potru
- 2022 – Ponniyin Selvan: I
  - Gargi
  - Iravin Nizhal
  - Kadaisi Vivasayi
  - Rocketry: The Nambi Effect
  - Vendhu Thanindhathu Kaadu
  - Vikram
- 2023 – Chithha
  - Ayothi
  - Maamannan
  - Kadaisi Vivasayi
  - Ponniyin Selvan: II
  - Viduthalai Part 1
- 2024 – Amaran
  - Kottukkaali
  - Lubber Pandhu
  - Maharaja
  - Meiyazhagan
  - Vaazhai

== Sources ==
- Anandan, ‘Film News' (2004). Sadhanaigal Padaitha Thamizh Thiraipada Varalaru [Tamil Film History and Its Achievements]. Sivagami Publications. p. 738.
- Collections. Update Video Publication. 1991.
- The Times of India directory and year book including who's who. Times of India Press. 1984.
