= Bangalore Days (soundtrack) =

Soundtrack album by Gopi Sundar
- Released: 30 April 2014
- Recorded: 2014
- Studio: Sound Factory, Cochin
- Genre: Film soundtrack
- Length: 29:46
- Language: Malayalam
- Label: Muzik 247
- Producer: Gopi Sundar

Gopi Sundar chronology
How Old Are You (2014)	Bangalore Days (2014)	Koothara (2014)

Singles from Bangalore Days
- 1. "Maangalyam" Released: 9 April 2014

Bangalore Days is the soundtrack to the 2014 Malayalam film of the same name directed by Anjali Menon. It Stars Nivin Pauly, Dulquer Salmaan, Fahadh Faasil and Nazriya Nazim in lead roles. The musical score composed and produced by Gopi Sundar, featured six songs with lyrics written by Rafeeq Ahamed, Santhosh Varma, Anna Katharina Valayil and Sundar. The soundtrack through Muzik 247 label on 30 April 2014, with the song "Maangalyam" preceded as a single on 9 April 2014. The music was well received by critics and audiences and won numerous accolades.

== Reception ==
Critic based at Deccan Chronicle summarised that "the soundtrack is filled with a lively Caribbean music". Karthik Srinivasan of Milliblog complimented "Gopi in his elements, as usual". Sowmya Rajendran of The News Minute felt that Gopi Sundar's music "captured the energy of the lively characters and its stories".

A critic from The Indian Express described the song "Maangalyam" sets the tone for the film with the introduction of the main characters and the story. Singer Divya S. Menon, who performed "Maangalyam" with Vijay Yesudas and Sachin Warrier, emerged breakthrough and later croon for several Malayalam songs.

== Plagiarism issues ==
Despite the critical reception of the soundtrack, Sundar was criticised for plaigiarising some of the tunes for his film. In September 2014, Canadian musician Bryan Adams, whom Sundar claimed as his inspiration, sued him for copyright violation as the song "Namma Ooru Bengaluru" had a strong resemblance to his song "Summer of '69" from the 1984 album Reckless. Sundar defended that he only adapted the guitar notes from that song while the melody was different. He further admitted, he used to listen to "Summer of '69" in his early days and with the admiration he had for Adams, he decided to adapt the same guitar notes for "Namma Ooru Bengaluru".

== Track listing ==
No.	Title	Singer(s)	Lyricist	Length
1	"Aethu Kari Raavilum"	Haricharan	Rafeeq Ahamed	5:29
2	"Maangalyam"	Vijay Yesudas, Sachin Warrier, Divya S. Menon	Santhosh Varma	3:53
3	"Thumbi Penne"	Siddharth Menon	Santhosh Varma	5:05
4	"Ente Kannil Ninakkai"	Nazriya Nazim, Gopi Sundar	Gopi Sundar, Anna Katharina Valayil, Rafeeq Ahamed, Santhosh Varma	5:18
5	"Namma Ooru Bengaluru"	Gopi Sundar	Santhosh Varma	3:01
6	"Baby I Need You"	Gopi Sundar, Anna Katharina Valayil	Gopi Sundar, Anna Katharina Valayil	3:07
7	"Maangalyam (Instrumental)"	—	—	3:53

== Accolades ==
Award	Date of ceremony (Note: Date is linked to the article about the awards held that year, wherever possible.)	Category	Recipient(s)	Result	Ref.
Asianet Film Awards	11 January 2015	Best Music Director	Gopi Sundar	Won	
Asianet Film Awards	11 January 2015	Best Lyricist	Rafeeq Ahamed ("Aethu Kari Raavilum")	Won	
Asianet Film Awards	11 January 2015	Best Male Playback Singer	Haricharan ("Aethu Kari Raavilum")	Won	
Asiavision Awards	14 November 2014	Best Music Director	Gopi Sundar	Won	
Filmfare Awards South	26 June 2015	Best Music Director – Malayalam	Gopi Sundar	Won	
Filmfare Awards South	26 June 2015	Best Male Playback Singer – Malayalam	Haricharan ("Aethu Kari Raavilum")	Won	
Filmfare Awards South	26 June 2015	Best Male Playback Singer – Malayalam	Vijay Yesudas & Sachin Warrier ("Maangalyam")	Nominated	
South Indian International Movie Awards	6—7 August 2015	Best Music Director – Malayalam	Gopi Sundar	Won	
South Indian International Movie Awards	6—7 August 2015	Best Lyricist – Malayalam	Rafeeq Ahamed ("Aethu Kari Raavilum")	Nominated	
South Indian International Movie Awards	6—7 August 2015	Best Male Playback Singer – Malayalam	Haricharan ("Aethu Kari Raavilum")	Nominated	
South Indian International Movie Awards	6—7 August 2015	Best Dance Choreographer – Malayalam	Brinda ("Maangalyam")	Nominated	
Vanitha Film Awards	15 February 2015	Popular Song of the Year	"Maangalyam"	Won	
