= List of awards and nominations received by Nazriya Nazim =

Nazriya Nazim awards and nominations
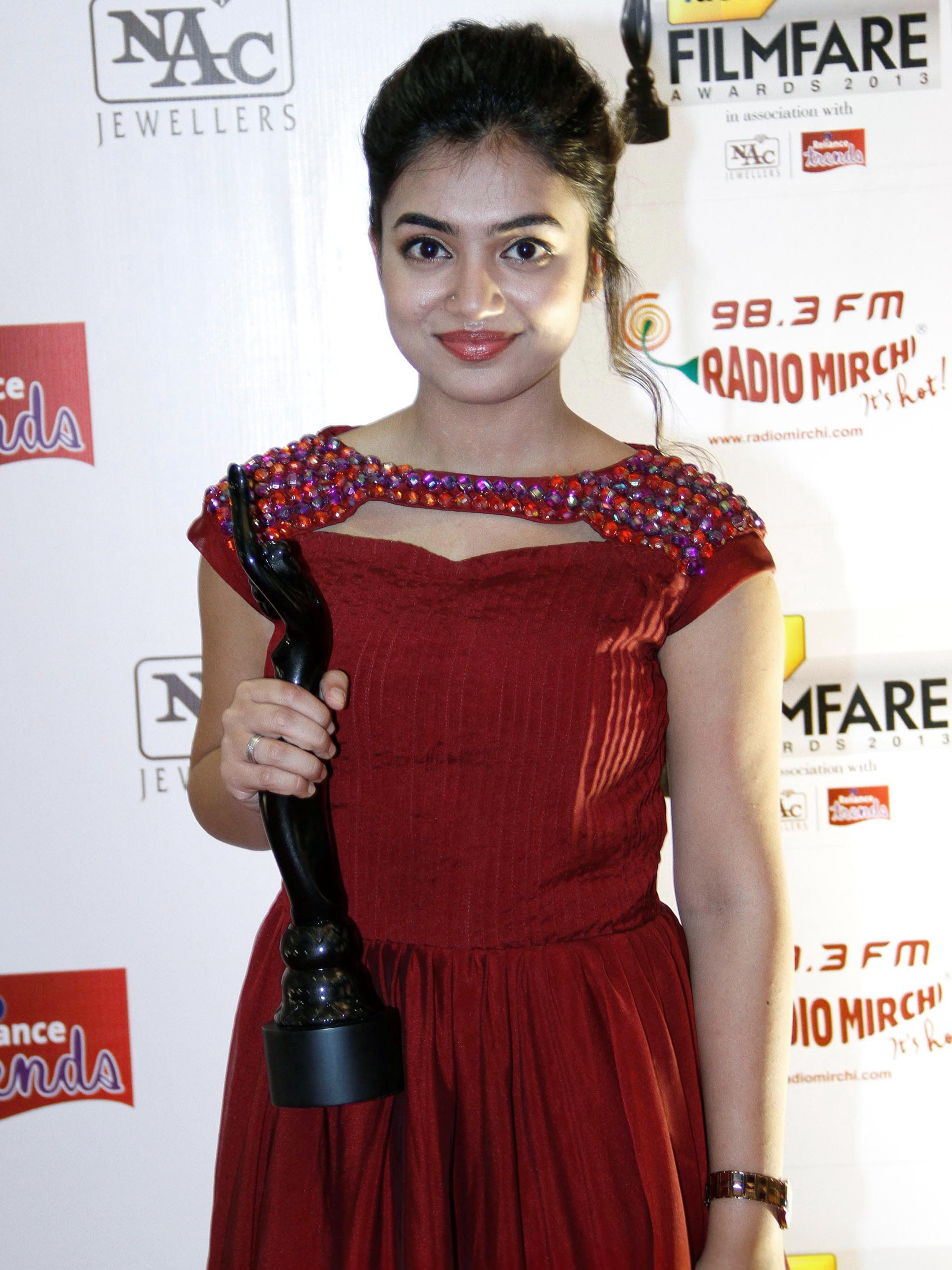
- Nazriya at the 61st Filmfare Awards South, in 2014
Awards and nominations
Award	Wins	Nominations
Ananda Vikatan Cinema Awards	1	2
Asianet Film Awards	2	6
Asiavision Awards	2	4
Filmfare Awards South	1	7
Kerala Film Critics Association Awards	1	1
Kerala State Film Awards	2	2
South Indian International Movie Awards	0	5
Tamil Nadu State Film Awards	1	1
Vanitha Film Awards	3	3

Totals (Note: Certain award groups do not simply award one winner. They acknowledge several different recipients, have runners-up, and have third place. Since this is a specific recognition and is different from losing an award, runner-up mentions are considered wins in this award tally. For simplification and to avoid errors, each award in this list has been presumed to have had a prior nomination.)
- Wins: 19
- Nominations: 41

Nazriya Nazim Fahadh is an Indian actress and producer who works predominantly in Malayalam and Tamil films. Nazriya is a recipient of several accolades including two Kerala State Film Awards, one Tamil Nadu State Film Award, one Filmfare Award South and one Kerala Film Critics Association Awards.

Nazriya first won the Filmfare Award for Best Female Debut – South and Tamil Nadu State Film Award Special Prize, both for Neram (2013). She then went onto receive two Kerala State Film Awards — Best Actress for Ohm Shanthi Oshaana (2014) and Bangalore Days (2014), and Best Film with Popular Appeal and Aesthetic Value for Kumbalangi Nights (2019). Nazriya also won the Kerala Film Critics Association Award for Best Actress for her performance in Sookshmadarshini.

== Amrita Film Awards ==
Nazriya has won one Amrita Film Awards.

Year	Category	Film	Result	Ref.
2013	Best Youthful Pair (with Nivin Pauly)	Neram	Won	

== Ananda Vikatan Cinema Awards ==
The Ananda Vikatan Cinema Awards are annual awards in recognition for cinematic merit in the Tamil film industry. Nazriya has won one award.

Year	Category	Film	Result	Ref.
2013	Best Debut Actress	Neram	Won	

== Asianet Film Awards ==
The Asianet Film Awards is an award ceremony for films presented annually by Asianet, a Malayalam-language television network from the south-Indian state of Kerala. Nazriya has won two awards from six nominations.

Year	Category	Film	Result	Ref.
2014	Best Star Pair (with Nivin Pauly)	Neram	Won	
2015	Best Actress	Ohm Shanthi Oshaana	Nominated	
2015	Most Popular Actress	Ohm Shanthi Oshaana	Won	
2019	Best Actress	Koode	Nominated	
2019	Most Popular Actress	Koode	Nominated	
2019	Best Character Actress	Koode	Nominated	

== Asiavision Awards ==
Asiavision Awards have been held annually since 2006 to honor the artistes and technicians of Indian cinema and television & is organized under the leadership of renowned journalist Nissar Syed. Nazriya has won two awards from four nominations.

Year	Category	Film	Result	Ref.
2013	New Sensational Actor – Female	Neram	Won	
2015	Best Actress	Ohm Shanthi Oshaana	Nominated	
2015	Best Actress	Bangalore Days	Nominated	
2015	Star of the Year - Female	Bangalore Days	Won	

== CPC Cine Awards ==
CPC Cine Awards is an annual awards ceremony for films in the Malayalam film industry, which was crowd-sourced and hosted by a Facebook group named Cinema Paradiso Club. Nazriya has won one award.

Year	Category	Film	Result	Ref.
2019	Best Film	Kumbalangi Nights	Won	

== Critics' Choice Film Awards ==
Nazriya has won one Critics' Choice Film Awards.

Year	Category	Film	Result	Ref.
2020	Best Film	Kumbalangi Nights	Won	

== Edison Awards ==
The Edison Awards is an annual awards ceremony since 2009 for people in the Tamil film industry. Nazriya has received one nomination.

Year	Category	Film	Result	Ref.
2014	Best Debut Actress	Neram	Nominated	

== Filmfare Awards South ==
The Filmfare Awards South are annual awards that honour artistic and technical excellence in the Telugu cinema, Tamil cinema, Malayalam cinema and Kannada cinema. They are presented by Filmfare magazine of The Times Group. Nazriya has won one award from seven nominations.

Year	Category	Film	Result	Ref.
2014	Best Female Debut – South	Neram	Won	
2014	Best Supporting Actress – Tamil	Raja Rani	Nominated	
2015	Best Actress – Malayalam	Ohm Shanthi Oshaana	Nominated	
2019	Best Actress – Malayalam	Koode	Nominated	
2023	Best Actress – Telugu	Ante Sundaraniki	Nominated	
2026	Best Film – Malayalam	Aavesham	Nominated	
2026	Best Actress – Malayalam	Sookshmadarshini	Nominated	

== Film Critics Circle of India ==
Film Critics Circle of India (FCCI) is a society comprising notable film critics from all the major film producing states of India. Nazriya has received one nomination.

Year	Category	Film	Result	Ref.
2019	Best Film	Kumbalangi Nights	Nominated	

== International Film Festival of Kerala ==
The International Film Festival of Kerala (abbreviated as IFFK) is a film festival held annually in Thiruvananthapuram, India. Started in 1996, it is hosted by the Kerala State Chalachitra Academy. Nazriya has won one award.

Year	Category	Film	Result	Ref.
2019	Best Malayalam Film –Special Mention	Kumbalangi Nights	Won	

== Kerala Film Critics Association Awards ==
The Kerala Film Critics Association Awards are presented annually by the Kerala Film Critics Association to honour both artistic and technical excellence of professionals in the Malayalam language film industry of India. Nazriya has won one award.

Year	Category	Film	Result	Ref.
2025	Best Actress	Sookshmadarshini	Won	

== Kerala State Film Awards ==
The Kerala State Film Awards are the film awards for a motion picture made in Kerala. The awards started in 1969 by the Department of Cultural Affairs, Government of Kerala and since 1998 the awards have been bestowed by Kerala State Chalachitra Academy on behalf of the Department of Cultural Affairs. Nazriya has won two awards.

Year	Category	Film	Result	Ref.
2015	Best Actress	Ohm Shanthi Oshaana & Bangalore Days	Won	
2020	Best Film with Popular Appeal and Aesthetic Value	Kumbalangi Nights	Won	

== Mazhavil Entertainment Awards ==
The Mazhavil Entertainment Awards is an award ceremony for films presented by Mazhavil Manorama, a Malayalam-language television network from the state of Kerala.

Year	Category	Film	Result	Ref.
2024	Entertainer of the Year – Film	Aavesham	Won	

== South Indian International Movie Awards ==
South Indian International Movie Awards, also known as the SIIMA Awards, rewards the artistic and technical achievements of the South Indian film industry. It was launched in 2012 to appreciate and honour film makers from across the South Indian film industries: Telugu cinema, Tamil cinema, Kannada cinema, and Malayalam cinema. Nazriya has received five nominations.

Year	Category	Film	Result	Ref.
2014	Best Female Debut – Tamil	Neram	Nominated	
2015	Best Actress – Malayalam	Ohm Shanthi Oshaana	Nominated	
2019	Best Film – Malayalam	Kumbalangi Nights	Nominated	
2020	Best Film – Malayalam	C U Soon	Nominated	
2025	Best Actress – Malayalam	Sookshmadarshini	Nominated	

== Tamil Nadu State Film Awards ==
Tamil Nadu State Film Awards are given for excellence in Tamil cinema in India. They were given annually to honour the best talents and provide encouragement and incentive to the South Indian film industry by the Government of Tamil Nadu. Nazriya has won one award.

Year	Category	Film	Result	Ref.
2014	Special Prize – Best Actress	Neram	Won	

== Vanitha Film Awards ==
The Vanitha Film Awards are presented annually by Vanitha, an Indian magazine from the Malayala Manorama group in the South Indian state of Kerala. Nazriya has won three awards.

Year	Category	Film	Result	Ref.
2014	Best Star Pair (with Nivin Pauly)	Neram	Won	
2015	Most Popular Actress	Ohm Shanthi Oshaana & Bangalore Days	Won	
2020	Best Film	Kumbalangi Nights	Won	

== Vijay Awards ==
The Vijay Awards are presented by the Tamil television channel STAR Vijay to honour excellence in Tamil cinema, given annually since 2006. Nazriya has won one award.

Year	Category	Film	Result	Ref.
2014	Best Debut Actress	Neram	Won	

== Other awards ==
=== Chittara Star Awards ===
The Chittara Star Awards are an annual event that honors achievements in Kannada cinema, television, and fashion. Nazriya has received one nomination.

Year	Category	Work	Result	Ref.
2025	South Icon – Female	—N/a	Nominated	

=== JFW Movie Awards ===
The JFW Movie Awards are an annual event that recognized women's achievements in various roles within the Malayalam and Tamil film industry.

Year	Category	Film	Result	Ref.
2025	Best Actress in a Lead Role	Sookshmadarshini	Nominated	
2025	Woman Producer of the Year	Aavesham	Nominated	

== Other recognitions ==
=== Media honours ===
- 2017: Nazriya was placed 6th in ScoopWhoop's "15 powerful female characters in Malayalam films" list, for her performance in Ohm Shanthi Oshaana.
- 2020: Nazriya was named the Women of the Year by Man's World.

=== Times of India ===
Year	Category	Result	Ref.
2014	Kochi Times Most Desirable Woman 2013	#5	
2014	Chennai Times Most Desirable Woman 2013	#12	
2018	Kochi Times Most Desirable Woman 2017	#3	
2019	Kochi Times Most Desirable Woman 2018	#3	
2021	Kochi Times Most Desirable Woman 2020	#3	
