= Vennala Mohan =

Writer and artist from Kerala

Vennala Mohan വെണ്ണല മോഹൻ
- Born: Mohankumar P.P; 18 May 1961; Vennala, Ernakulam
- Citizenship: Indian
- Education: Maharaja's College, Ernakulam
- Occupations: Novelist, Short story writer, Script writer, Lyricist, Poet, Actor, Dubbing artist
- Notable work: Ini Saranya Parayatte

Mohan Kumar P.P., also known as Vennala Mohan, is a multi-faceted artist with diverse contributions in Malayalam, including work as a novelist, short story writer, script writer, lyricist, poet, actor and dubbing artist. He has also anchored many programs in All India Radio and Doordarshan. Additionally, he holds a diploma in journalism and has worked with several leading media houses in Kerala and Lakshadweep.

== Early life ==
Vennala Mohan was born on 18 May 1961, in Vennala, Ernakulam district, Kerala. His father, Prabhakara Kurup, was a businessman, and his mother, Ambujakhy Kunjamma was a homemaker. Mohan received his education at Government High School, Vennala and Maharaja's College, Ernakulam. He began writing stories at the age of 13, with his first published work, "Oru Nunayude Katha" (Story of a Lie), appearing in Balalokam magazine in 1974, followed by Dukham (Sorrow) in Talir magazine in 1975.

== Contributions ==
=== Books ===
#	Name	Category	Year	Publisher
1	Innathe Katha	Collection Of Stories Of Various Authors		Malayala Sahityamandalam
2	Innathe Kavitha	Collection Of Poems Of Various Poets		Malayala Sahityamandalam
3	Radha	Novel	1990	Desabandhu
4	Ini Saranya Parayatte	Novel	2001	DC Books
5	Yudham	Novel	2004	DC Books
6	Vichithra Visheshangal	Stories	2006	Kurukshetra
7	Kuttikalkulla Ramayana Kathakal	Stories	2006	Kurukshetra
8	Keerthi Mudra	Novel	2007	Olive
9	Kavyangalkku Pinnile Kathakal	Stories	2008	Sura
10	Pathinettu Puranathile Kathakal	Stories	2008	Ascens
11	Agni Pookkunna Manassukal	Novelette	2009	Paridhi
12	Swayam Bhavi Ariyan	Astrology	2009	Ascens
13	Devayanam - Nagaram	Novel	2009	Sura
14	Avare Nakshathrangal Kathirikkunnu	Novel	2009	Samayam
15	Porutham	Novel	2010	Dronacharya
16	Manassil Oru Manchady	Novel	2010	Dronacharya
17	Kuttikalkulla Bhagavatha Kathakal	Stories	2012	Kurukshetra
18	Periya Puranayhile Kathakal	Stories	2012	Kurukshetra
19	Jalakangalkkappuram	Novel	2012	Insight
20	Mizhikalil Maunam	Novel	2012	Insight
21	Akasam Nashtappettaval	Novel	2012	Poorna
22	Orammaye Avasyamundu	Novel	2014	Arun
23	Manassinoru Marupuram	Novel	2017	Adithya Publications
24	Amruthu	Children's literature	2017	Buddha Books
25	Puranathile Poorvajanma Kathakal	Stories	2017	Kurukshetra
26	Mehaboob Pattinte Panapathram	Biography	2017	Soorya Books
27	Parayan Baki Vachathu	Memories	2019	Don Books Kottayam
28	Sooryan Padinjaru Udikkunnu	Novel	2019	Unma Books - Nooranad
29	Hidumbi	Novel	2020	Sahitya Pravarthaka Sahakarana Sankham
30	Chollukalkku Pinnile Purana Kadhakal	Stories	2021	Kurukshetra
31	Nurungukal	A New form of Literature	2022	Blue Ink Books
32	Mahabharatha Kadhakal	Children's Literature	2022	Balasahithi Prakasan Kerala
33	Parattavala	Novelette	2022	Pratibha books - Thrissur

=== Television ===
#	Name	Channel	Roles
1	Ennunni Kannanurangan	DD Malayalam	Screenplay, dialogue
2	Snehanjali	Asianet	Screenplay
3	Kannadiyile Mazha	Bharath T.V	Screenplay, dialogue
4	Agniputhri	Asianet	Dialogue
5	Sreedhanam	Jeevan TV	Story, screenplay, dialogue
6	Orammaye Avasyamundu	Asianet	Telefilm story, script
7	Puzha Parayukayanu	Asianet	Screenplay, story
8	Kannande Karyangal	Surya TV	Cinema story, screenplay
9	Nilavu Thodumpol	Surya TV	Script story
10	Ponnuvinum Oru Divasam	Surya TV	Cinema screenplay
11	Interview With Singer Manjari	Asianet	Script

== Links with Malayalam magazines ==
#	Name	Association
1	Balalokam	Editorial board member
2	Vartha Weekly	Editorial board member
3	Durmoham Evening Daily	Correspondent
4	Janmabhoomi Onam Special Issue	Editor
5	Sakhi	Editor
6	Deepaprabha Lakshadweep Varta Patrika	Editor
7	Kochi International Book Fest Souvenir	Editor
8	Dharmaprakasan Bulletin	Editor
9	Janani, America	Articles
10	International Malayalee, America	Articles
11	Rasmi Fortnightly, Germany	Novel columnist for last 20 years

=== Paper Presentation ===
#	Subject	Representation	Year	Organizer
1	Ramayana - The Classic	Represented Malayalam, the language of Kerala	2018	Jawaharlal Nehru University, New Delhi
2	Pundit K. P. Karappan, the leader of Renaissance	Selected for presentation	2018	Ayyankali Chair and University of Kerala, Thiruvananthapuram

== Awards ==
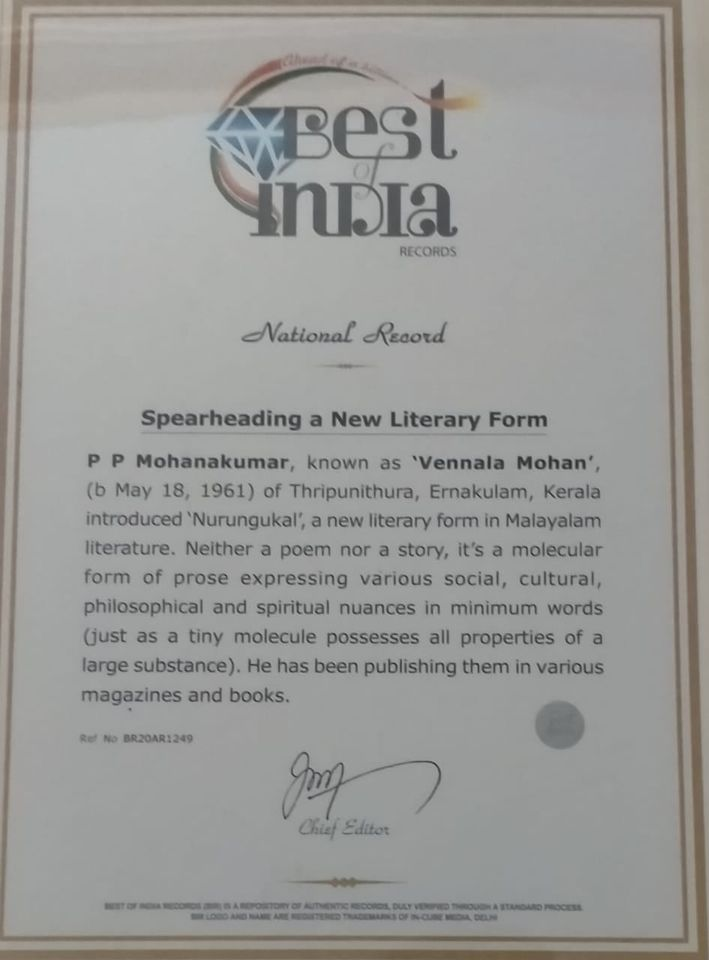

- 2022 - K Radhakrishanan Sahitya Puraskaram
- 2022 - Kavyayanam State Genius Award
- 2020 - Spearheading a New Literary Form - Vennala Mohan features in Best-of-India Records (BIR)
- 2012 – Atlas Kairali Bala Sahitya Award
- 2012 – Atymayanangalude Khasak Award For Novelette
- 2008 – Jaycey Foundation Award For Novel
- 1999 – Solomon Joseph Award For Short Story
