= Koode =

2018 film directed by Anjali Menon

- Theatrical release poster
- Directed by: Anjali Menon
- Screenplay by: Anjali Menon
- Story by: Sachin Kundalkar
- Based on: Happy Journey by Sachin Kundalkar
- Produced by: M. Renjith
- Starring: Prithviraj Sukumaran; Nazriya Nazim; Parvathy Thiruvothu
- Cinematography: Littil Swayamp
- Edited by: Praveen Prabhakar
- Music by: Raghu Dixit; M. Jayachandran
- Production companies: Rejaputhra Visual Media; Little Films
- Distributed by: Rejaputhra Release; Popcorn Entertainments (Asia–Pacific and Africa)
- Release date: 14 July 2018 (India)
- Running time: 155 minutes
- Country: India
- Language: Malayalam

Koode (transl. Along with) is a 2018 Indian Malayalam-language supernatural psychological drama film written and directed by Anjali Menon, starring Prithviraj Sukumaran, Nazriya Nazim and Parvathy Thiruvothu. The music was released by Muzik 247. The film marks the 100th film of Prithviraj, Parvathy's third collaboration with Prithviraj and second collaboration with both Menon and Nazriya who made her comeback to movies after four years. It was the official adaptation of 2014 Marathi film Happy Journey.

== Plot ==
The film opens showing Joshua working in a factory in Dubai. He gets an urgent phone call informing him about his sister Jenny's death. The movie then shifts to his landing in his hometown. He attends Jenny's funeral but seems unperturbed even after being shown her body.

A flashback shows a 15-year-old Josh, his mechanic father, and his mother, pregnant with his sister, preparing for Christmas festivities at home. At midnight mass, labor pains start, and a baby girl is delivered. Josh names his sister Jennifer. The flashback shows Josh adoring and caring for his baby sister. Jenny is diagnosed with birth defects and is expected not to live long, depending on medicines all her life.

The hospital expenses take a toll on the not-so-well-off family, and they struggle to keep food on the table. With so much happening at home, Josh is dismissed from school for not performing well. His father, who is aware of his love for machines, takes him to a train yard to cheer him up.

Josh's maternal uncle offers to take Josh to the Gulf and put him on some vocation, bringing some money to the household. The parents reluctantly agree. The film gently implies, without saying it, that Josh's uncle raped him, and Josh's early years overseas involved sexual labor.

Josh discovers many creative expressions of Jenny in her room, including drawings and poetry. He meets Brownie, Jenny's dog, who seems to like him. To take a drive through town, Josh asks his father to lend him a vehicle. His father shows him Jenny's ambulance van, which was used for her hospital trips. He drives the van to a lakeside and spends some time there. Soon, he discovers someone sleeping in the van's backseat, finding that it is Jenny. He wakes up and goes to the van parked outside his house. To his surprise, he finds Jenny alive inside the van, talking to him. The girl convinces him she is indeed Jenny, and he is the only person who can see/hear/talk to her.

The story now introduces Sophie, Josh's childhood sweetheart, who went on to marry an alcoholic but suffered domestic violence and ended up divorcing him. She is staying with her father and his family. The family members are not happy that she divorced her husband and badmouth her. Josh and Jenny visit the old dilapidated house he used to visit in his childhood. Josh finds Sophie there, and they ask about each other and leave. Back home, Sophie is molested by a younger cousin. She tells another relative, who interferes but tells her that the cousin is not at fault and that maybe she herself is an easy target and hence the consequence, depicting his malicious intentions as well. She is left aghast at her situation. The next day, Jenny and Josh, while roaming about in the van, discover Sophie contemplating suicide. Josh arrives on time and saves her.

Josh tracks down Coach Ashraf, who is shown to suffer from lower-body paralysis and some memory loss due to old age, living in a neglected situation. Josh and Sophie bring him to an old age home and start caring for him.

Jenny shows Josh her college and tells him about her life there. She tells him she liked Krish, a boy who played in a band. Because of her poetic skills, she participates with the band but collapses during a performance. Krish discovers her disease and deserts her. Josh finds Jenny's diary filled with love poems. He gives it to Krish. Josh finds his father always tinkering with toys that village children bring to him. He discovers his dad has been taking care of his childhood toys in the attic. He becomes emotional and realizes the love he missed from his father and buries the grudge he has against his father for sending him away at such a young age.

Meanwhile, things seem to go well for Ashraf. One day, he gives Josh his field whistle, seeing how Josh still seemed interested in football.

One day, Sophie and Josh spend time in the old house discussing a book when her family members come and forcibly take her away. Jenny tells Josh to help Sophie because he knows how much of a difference someone's support makes when one is alone. Josh, instigated, reaches Sophie's house and calls her to come with him. Sophie, taken aback by the suddenness and fearful of her cousins, refuses to go with him. It starts to rain, and Josh drives back and locks him up in his room, angry about why he listened to Jenny. He then sees Sophie walking to his house, all drenched. He runs, opens the door, takes her to his room, and shuts the door, leaving his family shocked by the turn of events. Sophie's family members come to Josh's house enquiring and make them open the room door, only to find that both of them have eloped through the window. They both drive through the place, living out of their van. Krish catches up with them and invites Josh to the college, where they are holding a memorial for Jenny. He then tells Josh that he is ashamed about the way he reacted to Jenny's illness. He discloses that he too liked Jenny. Josh attends the memorial with Sophie. Sophie's relatives come there and attack Josh. Krish and his friends save them from the gang, and they escape.

Jenny is happy having seen Krish save her brother. Josh and Sophie are spending the night at the lakeside. Jenny talks to Josh and tells him that he would make an amazing dad. The next morning, Josh discovers that Jenny is nowhere to be found. He then breaks down, sensing her absence for the first time after her death, and realises how much he will miss her. The film ends with Josh coaching local boys in football and becoming a father to a baby girl.

== Cast ==
- Prithviraj Sukumaran as Joshua Thomas/Josh/Cha
  - Zubin Nazeel as Young Josh
- Nazriya Nazim as Jennifer Maria Thomas/Jenny
  - Baby Mira as Young Jenny
- Parvathy Thiruvothu as Sophie
  - Mithuna Rajan as Young Sophie
- Ranjith as Aloshy
- Nilambur Ayisha as Grandmother
- Mala Parvathy as Lilly
- Roshan Mathew as Krish
- Siddharth Menon as Sean
- Atul Kulkarni as Coach Ashraf
- Devan as Ouseppachan, Sophie's father
- Pauly Valsan as Kochuthresiamma
- Sajitha Madathil as Class Teacher
- Santhosh Keezhattoor as Stephen, Lilly's brother
- Hakkim Shah as Simon (Sophie's cousin)
- Sarath Chandran as Abin (Jenny's friend)
- Darshana Rajendran as Alina
- CR Rajan (theater artist) as Joshua's distant relative
- Basil Paulose as Christy, Sophie's cousin
- Arun Sunny as Joe
- Shambu Menon as Monty
- Prajwal Prasad as Benjamin
- Nandhu Pothuval as Vijayan
- Bhadra Sandeep
- Neeraja Rajendran

== Production ==
The film began principal photography on 1 November 2017, coinciding with Kerala Piravi. Film's title was announced on 11 June 2018.

== Soundtrack ==
The soundtrack consists four songs written by Rafeeq Ahammed and Shruthy Namboothiri (Koode title track), two each composed by M. Jayachandran and Raghu Dixit. It was released on 15 June 2018 by the label Muzik 247. The background score was composed by Raghu Dixit.

Track listing
No.	Title	Lyrics	Music	Singer(s)	Length
1.	"Aararo"	Rafeeq Ahammed	Raghu Dixit	Anne Amie	4:07
2.	"Paranne"	Rafeeq Ahammed	Raghu Dixit	Benny Dayal, Raghu Dixit	4:18
3.	"Minnaminni"	Rafeeq Ahammed	M. Jayachandran	Abhay Jodhpurkar	4:44
4.	"Vaanaville"	Rafeeq Ahammed	M. Jayachandran	Karthik	4:41

== Release ==
Koode was initially scheduled to be released on 6 July 2018. It was released on 14 July 2018.

=== Box office ===
The film was both commercial and critical success and collected ₹40 crore from box office. The film collected ₹92 lakhs from the Bangalore box office.

== Accolades ==
Award (Note: Awards, festivals and organizations are in alphabetical order.)	Date of ceremony (Note: Date is linked to the article about the awards held that year, wherever possible.)	Category	Recipient(s)	Result	Ref.
Asianet Film Awards	6–7 April 2019	Most Popular Actor	Prithviraj Sukumaran	Won	
Asianet Film Awards	6–7 April 2019	Best Actress	Parvathy Thiruvothu	Nominated	
Asianet Film Awards	6–7 April 2019	Best Actress	Nazriya Nazim	Nominated	
Asianet Film Awards	6–7 April 2019	Most Popular Actress	Parvathy Thiruvothu	Nominated	
Asianet Film Awards	6–7 April 2019	Most Popular Actress	Nazriya Nazim	Nominated	
Asianet Film Awards	6–7 April 2019	Best Character Actress	Nazriya Nazim	Nominated	
Asianet Film Awards	6–7 April 2019	Best Music Director	M. Jayachandran	Won	
Filmfare Awards South	21 December 2019	Best Director – Malayalam	Anjali Menon	Nominated	
Filmfare Awards South	21 December 2019	Best Actor – Malayalam	Prithviraj Sukumaran	Nominated	
Filmfare Awards South	21 December 2019	Best Actress – Malayalam	Nazriya Nazim	Nominated	
Filmfare Awards South	21 December 2019	Best Supporting Actor – Malayalam	Ranjith	Nominated	
Filmfare Awards South	21 December 2019	Best Male Playback Singer – Malayalam	Karthik - ("Vaanaville")	Nominated	
Filmfare Awards South	21 December 2019	Best Male Playback Singer – Malayalam	Abhay Jodhpurkar - ("Minnaminni")	Nominated	
Filmfare Awards South	21 December 2019	Best Female Playback Singer – Malayalam	Anne Amie - ("Aararo")	Won	
South Indian International Movie Awards	15–16 August 2019	Best Actor – Malayalam	Prithviraj Sukumaran	Nominated	
South Indian International Movie Awards	15–16 August 2019	Critics Award for Best Actor – Malayalam	Prithviraj Sukumaran	Won	
South Indian International Movie Awards	15–16 August 2019	Best Supporting Actor – Malayalam	Roshan Mathew	Won	
South Indian International Movie Awards	15–16 August 2019	Best Supporting Actress – Malayalam	Mala Parvathy	Nominated	
South Indian International Movie Awards	15–16 August 2019	Best Male Playback Singer – Malayalam	Karthik - ("Vaanaville")	Nominated	
South Indian International Movie Awards	15–16 August 2019	Best Female Playback Singer – Malayalam	Anne Amie - ("Aararo")	Nominated	
