= Ustad Hotel (soundtrack) =

Soundtrack album by Gopi Sundar
- Released: 22 June 2012
- Recorded: 2011–2012
- Genre: Feature film soundtrack
- Length: 23:46
- Language: Malayalam
- Label: Satyam Audios
- Producer: Gopi Sundar

Gopi Sundar chronology
| Hero (2012) | Ustad Hotel (2012) | Nandhanam (2013) |

Ustad Hotel is the soundtrack to the 2012 film of the same name directed by Anwar Rasheed starring Thilakan, and Dulquer Salmaan. The five-song soundtrack features music composed by Gopi Sundar and lyrics written by Rafeeq Ahamed. The soundtrack was released by Satyam Audios on 22 June 2012 and was positively received, with the song "Appangalembadum" becoming chartbuster.

== Development ==
Gopi Sunder scored the film's music in his maiden collaboration with Rasheed. The composition started in late-2011. Rasheed rented a beachfront apartment in Kozhikode for his musical team so that they could relax and curate the music, in order to "get the feel and flavour of the place". Sunder found that the film's setting in Kozhikode has a Malabar flavor to it and was inspired by the mix of the conservative and modern aesthetics of the city, describing the traditional attires of Muslims in Kozhikode and its contrast with the foreigners visiting the city. The song "Mel Mel" was composed by Sunder at the balcony of the apartment.

Sunder had initially composed a tune for the sequence which featured a young woman with her band singing on stage, and Manjari was brought on for recording. However, as the song did not fit the visuals, Sunder scrapped that tune and looked for another alternative. Rasheed text the opening lines "Appangal embadum ottakku chuttammayi ammayi chuttathu marumonukkayi..." (transl. The aunt had prepared appams for his son-in-law), when Sunder was composing jingle for Zandu Balm at his studio in Chennai, and spontaneously curated the tune surrounding the lyrics which became "Appangalembadum". Singer-lyricist Anna Katharina Valayil and guitarist Donan Murray, who were present at the studio, eventually involved with the song. It is based on the traditional Mappilapaattu sung during Muslim weddings. In the film, the song is performed by the fictional band "Kalumekkaya".

"Subhanallah", is a mix of Sufi and Spanish music used in the film's background score. According to the screenwriter Anjali Menon, the songs were grown within the film's emotional moments. During the sequence where Ustad Hotel is introduced, the team looked for few words that they could be used as chorus in the background score, Menon suggested "Subhanallah" to be used as the opening lines of the song, which the team agreed.

== Release ==
Ustad Hotel's five-song soundtrack preceded with "Appangalembadum" as the first to be released in April 2012, and "Vaathilil" the following month. Rasheed claimed that the other three songs in the film are situational and integral to the narrative, and they could not be released earlier. The early release of the two songs as singles were the promotional material for the film, to attract the required publicity. The soundtrack was eventually released by Satyam Audios on 22 June 2012.

== Track listing ==
| No. | Title | Singer(s) | Length |
|---|---|---|---|
| 1. | "Appangalembadum" | Anna Katharina Valayil and Gopi Sundar | 4:48 |
| 2. | "Mel Mel Mel" | Naresh Iyer and Anna Katharina Valayil | 4:11 |
| 3. | "Vaathilil Aa Vaathilil" | Haricharan | 6:05 |
| 4. | "Subhanallah" | Gopi Sunder | 4:52 |
| 5. | "Sanchari Nee" | Gopi Sundar | 4:30 |
| Total length: | | | 23:46 |

== Reception ==
Vipin Nair of Music Aloud described it as "an entertaining soundtrack" giving a score of 7 (out of 10). Anil R. Nair of The New Indian Express reviewed that Sunder's music "injects more life to this bittersweet movie". Sify's review described Sunder's music as one of the film's highlights.

The song "Appangalembadum" became popular with children and young adults, emerging it as one of the biggest Malayalam hits of that year. In an interview, Bijibal described the film's background score by Sunder as his favorite contemporary film scores, due to the Sufi elements present in it.
