= MC Jithin =

Indian director and screenwriter

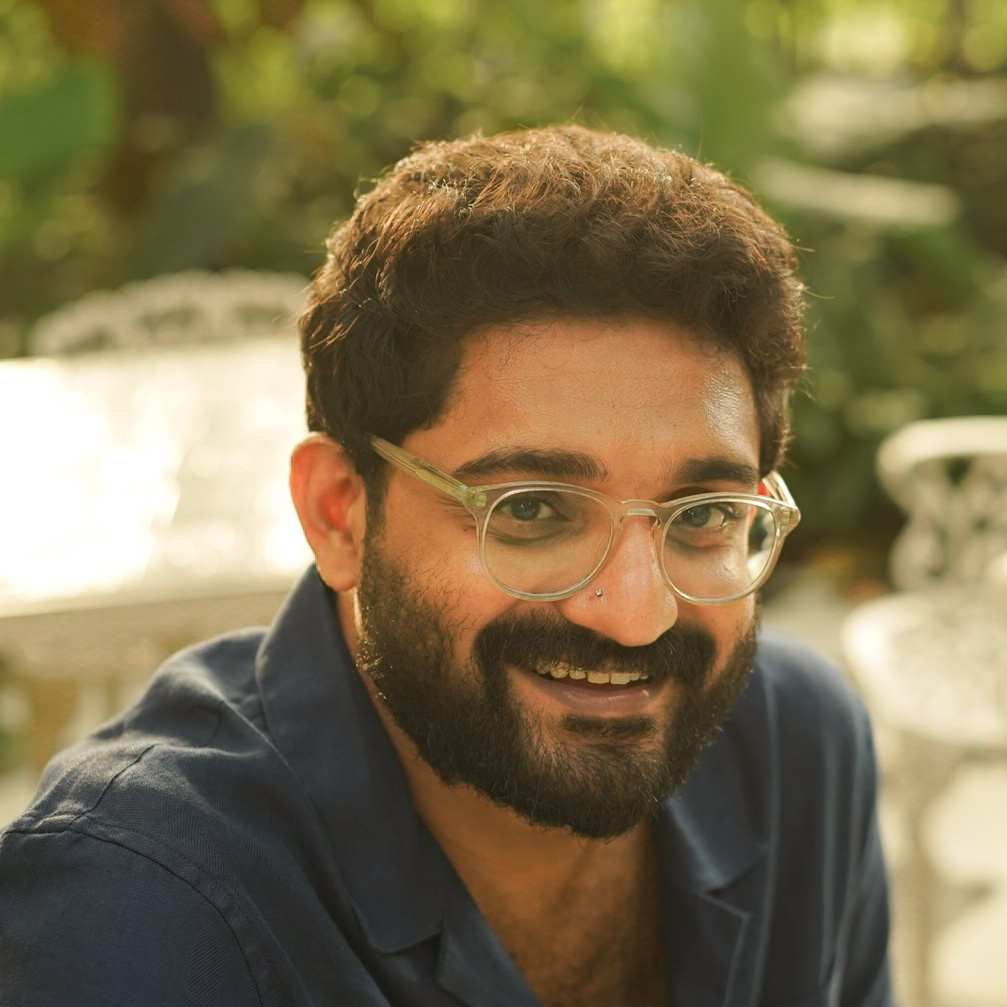
- MC Jithin in 2024
- Born: MC Jithin; Iritty, Kannur, Kerala, India
- Education: St. Joseph College of Communication, Changanassery; University of Madras
- Occupations: Film director; Screenwriter; Educator
- Years active: 2011–present
- Known for: Nonsense; Sookshmadarshini

MC Jithin is an Indian film director, screenwriter, and educator from Kerala. His notable works include Nonsense (2018), a film that critiques the education system, and Sookshmadarshini (2024), a psychological thriller that received critical acclaim.

== Early life and education ==
Jithin was born in Iritty, Kannur, Kerala, He pursued a Bachelor of Arts in multimedia at St. Thomas College of arts and science, Changanassery, and later obtained a master's degree in visual communication from the University of Madras.

== Career ==
MC Jithin started his career directing short films. His 2012 short, Water, a public service advertisement, won recognition at WATER COMMONS-FLICK FEST' 12.

Jithin worked as assistant director under Abrid Shine for film 1983 (2014). He gained recognition for his debut feature film Nonsense (2018), a sports comedy, which tackled flaws in the education system. The film was praised for its bold storytelling and social commentary. The film starred Rinosh George, Vinay Forrt and Shruthi Ramachandran.

In 2024, Jithin directed Sookshmadarshini, a black comedy psychological thriller exploring themes of curiosity and human behavior. The film was praised for its emotional depth and layered storytelling.

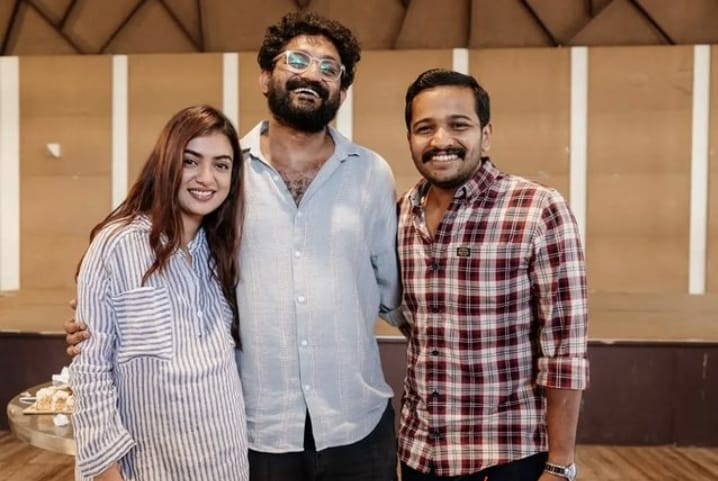
MC with Basil and Nazriya

The film starred Nazriya Nazim and Basil Joseph.

=== Educator ===
Jithin serves as the head of the Film Studies Department at Don Bosco IMAGE in Vennala. He is also a guest lecturer and conducts workshops across various institutions in South India.

== Filmography ==
Year	Title	Role	Type
2011	Mallus	Writer, Director	Short film
2012	Water	Director	Public Service Advertisement
2012	Friday	Writer, Director	Short film
2012	Loud Truth	Writer, Director	Short film
2012	Chilappol Chilar	Writer	Short film
2018	Nonsense	Director, Screenwriter	Film
2024	Sookshmadarshini	Director, Screenwriter	Film

== Awards and recognitions ==
- **2012**: Public Service Advertisement Water received the 2nd runner-up award from Padmashri K Balachander, conducted by Centre of Excellence for Change, National Key Resource Centre, Govt. of India, at WATER COMMONS-FLICK FEST' 12.
