= Sookshmadarshini =

2024 Indian film by MC Jithin

- Theatrical Release Poster
- Directed by: M. C. Jithin
- Screenplay by: Athul Ramachandran; Libin T. B.
- Produced by: A. V. Anoop; Shyju Khalid; Sameer Thahir
- Starring: Nazriya Nazim; Basil Joseph
- Cinematography: Sharan Velayudhan Nair
- Edited by: Chaman Chakko
- Music by: Christo Xavier
- Production companies: AVA Productions; Happy Hours Entertainments
- Distributed by: Bhavana Release; Berkshire Dreamhouse (Overseas, non-gcc)
- Release date: 22 November 2024
- Running time: 143 minutes
- Country: India
- Language: Malayalam
- Budget: ₹10−14 crore
- Box office: est. ₹55−56 crore

Sookshmadarshini (transl. Microscope) is a 2024 Indian Malayalam-language mystery comedy-thriller film directed by M. C. Jithin, written by Libin T.B and Athul Ramachandran. Produced by Happy Hours Entertainments and AVA Productions, it stars Nazriya Nazim and Basil Joseph alongside Akhila Bhargavan, Pooja Mohanraj and Merin Philip in the supporting roles. The film revolves around Priyadarshini and her friends, who sets out to track down the whereabouts of Manuel, a bakery owner who has recently returned to their neighborhood, with his mother Grace.

The film was shot across Kerala, primarily Kolenchery, from May 2024 to August 2024. It has cinematography, editing and music by Sharan Velayudhan, Chaman Chacko and Christo Xavier respectively.

Sookshmadarshini was released in theatres on 22 November 2024, to positive reviews from critics and grossed ₹55 crore worldwide.

== Plot ==
Priyadarshini, a homemaker on a desperate job hunt, lives with her husband Anthony and their daughter Kani in a close-knit community. Priya and her neighbour Stephy, a single mother, perform well in their technical interviews for the same company. Manuel, who runs his father's business Grace Bakers, moves into their neighborhood with his widowed, aged mother Grace. Though Manuel gets along well with all the neighbors, Priya believes he is shady. Her suspicions turn out to be true when he kills an monitor lizard and feeds it to his neighbors at a party under the guise of beef. He intends to commit a crime with the help of his uncle Roy and his cousin Dr. John, while Grace remains cloistered and avoids communication with any of the neighbors.

At a party for Priya and Anthony's wedding anniversary, a minor fire accident occurs at Manuel's residence due to a clothes iron left on, and Grace goes missing. Manuel lodges a police complaint, and they eventually find Grace in a railway station. At this point, everyone discovers that Grace has been diagnosed with Alzheimer's. Priya distrusts the claim because she has always seen Grace carrying out her daily chores efficiently and confides it with her friends Sulu and Asma. Meanwhile, Stephy grows close to Manuel and offers to take a day off to look after Grace in Manuel's absence. Before departing, Manuel makes a sedated mango juice for Grace and Stephy to execute their plan as per John's advice. Roy waits outside the residence for Grace and Stephy to fall unconscious to take her away, but Priya visits Grace to clear her suspicions. Learning this, Manuel manipulates Anthony to task Priya with searching for a caretaker's contact urgently, clearing his way. Soon, Stephy sleeps due to sedation, and Roy covertly carries Grace out of the house in his car. She is claimed to have gone missing once again.

Manuel's elder sister Diana arrives from New Zealand to assist Manuel with the chaos and put their land on sale. She is disappointed with the lack of progress in the police investigation and decides to return. Priya earns Diana's contact before she departs. That same night, Priya is shocked to see Grace in their residence, but Manuel tells Anthony that she is still missing. The next night, Priya sneaks into their residence in Manuel's absence, asking Sulu and Asma to keep a watch and alert her if someone comes. John, who happens to be inside the residence, sees Priya climbing the walls and, panic-stricken, calls Manuel to inform him; Manuel rushes home, catches Priya red-handed, and cautions her against doing this again. Elsewhere, John is shown pouring aqua regia into the toilet, allegedly disposing of Grace's remains. Manuel notices a leakage as he observes a crimson damp patch on a wall (blood). He paints it and places sacks to cover the patch, further raising Priya's suspicion. Unexpectedly, Manuel brings Grace home, and the group retreats from their suspicions. However, Priya remains unsettled and contacts Diana, but it is revealed that Manuel has Diana's phone and has been texting Priya, impersonating Diana.

On the day of her second interview, Priya goes through Diana's Instagram profile. She realizes that Diana is a lesbian and in a relationship with Aditi Thyagarajan, a Tamil woman with whom she intends to adopt a child in New Zealand. Simultaneously, Aditi arrives in India, concerned that Diana has not returned to New Zealand and has suddenly refrained from talking to her. Priya reaches out to Aditi to warn her about Manuel, but before she can run away, Manuel kidnaps her on the suggestion of Grace, who was revealed to be the mastermind of the plan. Priya abandons her interview and contacts Aditi, but it is too late as Manuel sedates her and carries her away, intending to kill her. She discovers that the sample she has collected from the painted damp patch contains human bone cells from her biologist friend. Priya tracks them to their new bakery outlet and informs the police. Before they can come, Manuel spots Priya and tries to attack her. She hits him with her car and subdues John, rescuing Aditi. A flashback reveals that Manuel, Roy, and John killed Diana to avoid shame due to her sexuality, and Grace is the perpetrator of the honor killing. The crime gets exposed; the police arrests Manuel, Grace, John, and Roy; and the truth stuns the whole neighborhood.

== Cast ==
- Nazriya Nazim as Priyadarshini "Priya" Antony
- Basil Joseph as Manuel
- Akhila Bhargavan as Sulu, Priya's friend and neighbour
- Pooja Mohanraj as Asma, Priya's friend and neighbour
- Merin Philip as Stephy, Priya's friend and neighbour who is Manuel's girlfriend
- Sidharth Bharathan as Dr. John, Manuel's cousin and a neurosurgeon
- Deepak Parambol as Antony, Priya's husband
- Kottayam Ramesh as Roy, Manuel's uncle
- Manohari Joy as Grace, mother of Manuel and Diana
- Abhiram Radhakrishnan as a finance manager
- Hezzah Mehak as Kani Antony, Priya and Anthony's daughter
- Janani Ram as Diana, Manuel's elder sister
- Saraswathi Menon as Aditi Thiagarajan, Diana's girlfriend
- Gopan Mangattu as Krishnettan
- Jaya Kurup as Sarojini
- Rini Udayakumar as Cicily, Manuel's neighbour
- James as Thomas
- Noushad Ali as Ajmal
- AV Anoop as Managing Director
- Athira Rajeev as Mridula
- Sajeevan as CI of Police
- Sajeed as SI
- Binni Rinki as Jesna
- Nandan Unni as Broker Prasad
- Jossy Sijo as CPO
- Fr.Saji as Priest
- Ajmal Shah as Kapyar
- Dhyan Diva as Stephy's son

== Production ==
=== Development ===
Happy Hours Entertainments and AVA Productions announced the film in May 2024, with Nazriya Nazim and Basil Joseph as the leads. The film is directed by Jithin MC who previously did Nonsense (2018). The film is jointly written by director Jithin, Athul Ramachandran and Libin TB. It has cinematography by Sharan Velayudhan, editing by Chaman Chacko and music by Christo Xavier. It marks Nazriya's return to Malayalam films after four years hiatus who last appeared in Trance (2020).

According to Jithin the idea came during the filming of his first film Nonsense in 2018. He wanted his next film to be shot in fewer locations, and use more interior settings as opposed to Nonsense which was a one-day road film that had logistical challenges that extended schedule and budget. He decided to make the film in semi-rural neighbourhood having a close-knit community and relatable characters in a Hitchcockian style. He intended including a female detective as the central character instead of a conventional police officer or CBI agent in Malayalam films. Sameer Thahir suggested Nazriya for the character who was not the initial choice during casting and was roped in for the role in 2022, while Basil Joseph was part of the film in 2023.

=== Filming and casting ===
After scouting location that have 2 to 3 residences situated in a distance of 15 to 20 meters suited for the neighborhood setting, Kolenchery was the preferred place where the film was mostly shot in. Principal photography for the film begin in May 2024 and the film was shot across Kerala. In August 2024, the filming was wrapped up.

Akhila Bhargavan, Merin Philp, Pooja Mohanraj, Deepak Parambol, Siddharth Bharathan and Kottayam Ramesh were cast in other prominent roles. Gopan Mangat, Manohari Joy, Rini Udayakumar, Jaya Kurup, Muskaan Bisaria, Aparna Ram, Abhiram Poduval, Binny Rinky, Nandan Unni, Naushad Ali, Athira Rajeev and Mirza Fathia formed rest of the cast.

== Soundtrack ==
The music for the film was composed by Christo Xavier. The film has only 2 songs. One track is used as a promotional song.

Track listing
| No. | Title | Lyrics | Singer | Length |
|---|---|---|---|---|
| 1. | "Dhurooha Manthahasame" | Mu. Ri | Ahi Ajayan | 3:32 |
| 2. | "Priya Lokame" | Vinayak Sasikumar | Sooraj Santhosh | 3:05 |

== Release ==
=== Theatrical ===
The film was released in theatres on 22 November 2024.

=== Home media ===
The digital rights of the film is acquired by Disney+ Hotstar and started streaming from 11 January 2025.

== Reception ==
=== Box office ===
On the opening day of its release, the film grossed ₹1.6 crore from Kerala, and a worldwide gross of ₹4.1 crore. It made over ₹6 crore on day 2 taking the film's two day total to ₹10.1 crore worldwide. It grossed ₹23 crore worldwide in 5 days. By the end of the second week, Sookshmadarshini collected over ₹25 crore in India of which ₹20 crore coming from Kerala and ₹19 crore from overseas grossing over ₹44 crore worldwide. It has grossed 55 crore worldwide in its final run with ₹32 crore from India and ₹23 crore from overseas.

=== Critical reception ===
The film generally received positive reviews from critics.

Anandu Suresh of The Indian Express gave the film 3.5/5 stars and wrote, "From the outset, Sookshmadarshini expertly balances mystery and comedy, ensuring that neither overshadows the other, creating a harmonious blend that engages audiences throughout." S. R. Praveen of The Hindu wrote, "The film is a cleverly written thriller that turns what could easily have been a run-of-the-mill film into an elevating experience. It becomes yet another addition to Malayalam cinema's unrelenting run this year, both in quality and variety." Princy Alexander of Onmanorama wrote, " Overall, the film breaks cliches and is refreshing, which will work well for the family audience ".

Cris of The News Minute wrote, "MC Jithin directed a smartly-written script, putting Nazriya and Basil Joseph in the thick of it, and pulling off one helluva thriller with Sookshmadarshini." Vignesh Madhu of The New Indian Express rated 3.5/5 and wrote, "Backed by brilliant writing and clever casting choices, MC crafts Sookshmadarshini as a thoroughly engaging experience. What stands out is the refreshing treatment that doesn't conform to the genre formulas." Latha Srinivasan of Hindustan Times wrote, " A captivating Malayalam thriller that rely on local life and relatable characters."

T Maruthi Acharya of India Today rated 3.5/5 and wrote," Despite minor flaws in the plot, the film's technical aspects elevate it, making it a thoroughly engaging thriller that holds its own within the genre". Sia Viju of Mathrubhumi rated 3.5/5 and wrote, " The screenplay is a masterclass in pacing and unpredictability. Sharan Velayudhan Nair's cinematography captures the essence of the setting beautifully, Chaman Chakko's sharp editing ensures there's never a dull moment. Christo Xavier's music deserves special mention." Anna Mathews of The Times of India gave 4/5 and wrote, "Here is a film where all the elements, the writing, direction, acting, music and more, come together in sync to make for an exciting thriller. This is an entertainer that will appeal to theatre audiences.".

== Accolades ==
| Year | Award | Category | Recipient | Ref. |
|---|---|---|---|---|
| 2024 | Kerala Film Critics Association Awards | Best Actress | Nazriya Nazim | |
| 2024 | Kerala Film Critics Association Awards | Second Best Film | MC Jithin | |
