= Bangalore Days =

2014 Indian film by Anjali Menon

- Theatrical release poster
- Directed by: Anjali Menon
- Written by: Anjali Menon
- Produced by: Anwar Rasheed; Sophia Paul
- Starring: Nazriya Nazim; Nivin Pauly; Dulquer Salmaan; Fahadh Faasil; Parvathy Thiruvothu; Isha Talwar
- Narrated by: Nivin Pauly
- Cinematography: Sameer Thahir
- Edited by: Praveen Prabhakar
- Music by: Gopi Sunder
- Production companies: Anwar Rasheed Entertainments; Weekend Blockbusters
- Distributed by: A & A Release Through; August Cinema & Tricolor Entertainments
- Release date: 30 May 2014 (India)
- Running time: 171 minutes
- Country: India
- Language: Malayalam
- Budget: ₹8 crore
- Box office: est. ₹45 crore

Bangalore Days is a 2014 Indian Malayalam-language coming-of-age comedy drama film written and directed by Anjali Menon, and produced by Anwar Rasheed and Sophia Paul under the banner Anwar Rasheed Entertainments and Weekend Blockbusters. The film features an ensemble cast of Nazriya Nazim, Nivin Pauly, Dulquer Salmaan, Fahadh Faasil, Parvathy Thiruvothu, and Isha Talwar.

Bangalore Days revolves around the life of three cousins from Kerala who move to Bangalore, continuing Anjali Menon's trend of films about family relationships. The film released on 30 May 2014 in 205 theatres, making it one of the biggest release for a Malayalam film, simultaneously all over India. The film was a blockbuster at the box office. The film received critical acclaim, and with an estimated collection of ₹45 crore, became one of the highest grossing Malayalam films.

The film received three Kerala State Film Awards: Best Actor (for Pauly), Best Actress (for Nazriya) and Best Screenplay (for Anjali Menon), and two Filmfare Awards South: Best Supporting Actress (for Parvathy) and Best Director (for Anjali Menon). The film was later remade in Tamil as Bangalore Naatkal (2016) and in Hindi as Yaariyan 2 (2023). Bangalore Days is considered as one of the best Malayalam films of the New-Gen cinema movement and has gained a cult status over the years.

== Plot ==
Three cousins—Arjun "Aju", Krishnan "Kuttan" P.P., and Divya "Kunju" Prakash—have shared an inseparable bond since childhood. As adults, they find themselves relocated to Bangalore under different circumstances. Aju, whose parents are divorced, is a free-spirited bike mechanic who lives life on his own terms. Kuttan is a traditional software engineer who deeply misses his rural home in Kerala. Kunju, who aspires to pursue an MBA from IIM, is instead pressured by her family into an arranged marriage with Shivadas "Das", a workaholic corporate executive, following the advice of an astrologer. After the wedding, Kunju moves to Bangalore to live with Das, while Kuttan settles there for his IT career, and Aju joins a local biker gang as their mechanic.

In Bangalore, Kunju grows increasingly isolated due to Das's emotional detachment and neglect. Her primary solace comes from spending time with her cousins. Meanwhile, the naive Kuttan, who dreams of marrying a traditional, saree-clad woman, falls in love with Meenakshi, an air hostess he meets on a flight. To impress her, Kuttan alters his personality and style, transforming into a trendy individual. However, the relationship abruptly ends when Meenakshi's ex-boyfriend arrives at her apartment, making Kuttan realize that she was merely using him to incite jealousy and reconcile with her former partner.

Concurrently, Kunju and Das’s marriage continues to deteriorate. Following a heated argument, Kunju explores a locked room in their apartment that Das has strictly prohibited anyone from entering. Inside, she discovers a room filled with photos and personal belongings of an unfamiliar woman. Devastated by the realization that she holds no place in Das's heart, Kunju leaves him and returns to Kerala alongside Kuttan. Upon their arrival, they face further family turmoil; Kuttan's father has abandoned his wealthy household to embark on a permanent spiritual pilgrimage, transferring all asset rights to Kuttan and his sister. At his mother's insistence, Kuttan eventually relocates her to Bangalore.

During this period, Aju, a former competitive bike racer serving a one-year ban due to a track violation, falls in love with the voice of Sarah, a local radio jockey. Upon meeting her, he discovers that she is a paraplegic who uses a wheelchair. Drawn to her resilient attitude, Aju forms a deep friendship with her, though he becomes disheartened upon learning that she has secured a university scholarship to study in Australia.

While Kunju and Das initiate divorce proceedings, Aju uncovers Das’s hidden past. He learns that Das was once a renowned bike racer known as "Shiva," who led a prominent motorcycle gang. Shiva had abruptly abandoned racing after a tragic accident that claimed the life of his true love, Natasha Francis. Moved by this revelation, Kunju decides to return to Bangalore to give her marriage another chance while pursuing her MBA. Through patience and understanding, she helps a repentant Das process his grief and arranges a meeting between him and Natasha's parents. This encounter allows Das to finally let go of his past, leading to a genuine reconciliation with Kunju.

Kuttan’s mother quickly adapts to urban life through her neighbors and, after three months, decides to visit her daughter in Oklahoma. At the airport, Kuttan and his mother run into Meenakshi, who is assigned to the same flight. Meenakshi approaches Kuttan, revealing that her previous relationship has ended permanently and that she is waiting for his call. Moving past his old heartbreak, Kuttan politely but firmly rejects her, choosing to move forward with his life.

Aju secures a chance to compete in a critical race on the same day Sarah is scheduled to depart for Australia. With Kunju, Kuttan, and Das cheering from the stands, Aju wins the championship. Realizing Sarah's profound impact on his life, Aju rushes to intercept her before her departure and asks her to stay. Sarah chooses to forgo her scholarship to remain with Aju in Bangalore. Sometime later, Kuttan marries Michelle, a European neighbor and Bharatanatyam dancer who has deeply embraced Indian culture. The film concludes with the three cousins and their partners joyfully gathering in Kuttan's room to take a group photograph.

== Cast ==
- Nazriya Nazim as Divya Prakash "Kunju"
- Nivin Pauly as Krishnan P. P "Kuttan"
- Dulquer Salmaan as Arjun "Aju"
- Fahadh Faasil as Shivadas "Das", Kunju's husband
- Parvathy Thiruvothu as RJ Sarah, Aju's love interest
- Isha Talwar as Meenakshi, Kuttan's ex love interest
- Paris Laxmi as Michelle, Kuttan's wife
- Maniyanpilla Raju as Prakash, Divya's father
- Praveena as Shobha, Divya's mother
- Vijayaraghavan as Kuttan's father
- Kalpana as Vanaja, Kuttan's mother
- Prathap Pothen as Francis, Natasha's father
- Vinaya Prasad as Lincy Francis, Natasha's mother
- Sagar Shiyas
- Rekha as Sarah's mother
- Sijoy Varghese as Coach Zakariah
- Shishira Thomas as Rhea, Sarah's cousin
- Sajid Yahiya as Samy, member of Storm Riderz
- Vivas as Divya's brother
- Thrissur Balan as Das's father
- Bindu as Das's mother
- Mridula as Das's sister
- Tinu Thomas Kannur as Das's brother
- Krishna Prasad as Kuttan's uncle
- Abhinav as Rakesh, member of the opposing team and Arjun's rival
- Aravind K.P. as himself
- Nithya Menen as Natasha Francis, Das's late girlfriend (cameo appearance). A labrador named Simba played Natasha's pet in the film.

== Production ==
=== Development ===
After the success of Manjadikuru and Ustad Hotel, Anjali Menon announced her new project named L for Love, and said it will be produced by Anwar Rasheed and Sophia Paul in later Anjali clarified that the film was titled Bangalore Days. Anjali described the film as simple at its core, about people we all know, about dreams, relationships, love and how our environment can transform us and yet within. In a conversation to a leading newspaper, Anjali said that most of the film would be shot completely in Bangalore, the City of Garden, as the story demands it and the film will features bunch of youngsters who have migrated to Bangalore for work and their lives in the city. The film was again from the friendship of Anjali and Anwar Rasheed shared when they worked together in the previous films. Menon announced that the film features new actors and actress of Malayalam cinema including Nivin Pauly, Dulquer Salmaan, Nazriya Nazim and Fahadh Faasil. Rafeeq Ahmed, Santhosh Varma and Anna Katharina Valayil wrote the lyrics while Gopi Sunder signed to compose the music of the film. Cinematography was handled by Sameer Thahir and editing was given to Praveen Prabhakar. The first look trailer of the film was released online on 7 May 2014, followed by a subtitled version on 12 May. Anjali selected Nazriya, Dulquer and Nivin which will be perfect and fit for the role of three cousins. Fahadh was later selected to do his character. Maniyanpilla Raju, Praveena, Vijayaraghavan, Kalpana and Vivas were signed for supporting roles.

=== Filming ===
Filming of Bangalore Days started in December 2013. The filming was wrapped in March 2014 and completed shooting in 70 days. The film was shot in Bangalore, Kochi at a budget of ₹8.5 crore (US$880,000). The song "Ethu Kari Raavilum" was shot in Mysore and some of the scenes in Sankey.

== Music ==
The soundtrack features five songs composed by Gopi Sunder. He was sued for copyright violation by Bryan Adams on the basis that the song "Nam Ooru Bengaluru" bore a strong resemblance to Adams' song "Summer of '69". The track "Ente Kannil Ninakkai" seems to be based on Carla Bruni's song, "Quelqu'un m'a dit" from her album of the same name. The track "Ente Kannil Ninakkai" also seems to be based on John Mayer's song, Edge of Desire from his album Battle Studies (album). The lyrics were written by Rafeeq Ahmed, Santhosh Varma and Anna Katharina Valayil.

== Release ==
The film was originally scheduled for release on 9 May 2014, but was rescheduled due to delays in production. The film released on 30 May 2014 in 205 theatres, making it one of the biggest release for a Malayalam film, simultaneously all over India. At the time of release, Bangalore Days was the Malayalam film to have a subtitled release in maximum number of screens. The movie released with English subtitles, in more than 200 screens across India. The film released in UAE on 3 July 2014.

Bangalore Days was distributed in India by A & A Release through August Cinema. Star Movie was the distributor in the United States, Indian Movies in United Kingdom and Tricolor Entertainments in Australia, New Zealand, Malaysia, Singapore and Japan.

== Reception ==
=== Critical reception ===
The film received positive reviews from critics, with praise towards the direction, performances, music, and cinematography. On the review aggregator website Rotten Tomatoes, 100% of 5 critics' reviews are positive, with an average rating of 7/10.

Veeyen of Nowrunning.com stated that "Bangalore Days is a buoyant examination of love, the basest of all human emotions and the bonds and bondages that it leaves in its wake. Pungently played out in the metro city of Bangalore, it's a stunning reminder of a spectacular marvel that unravels before us every day — a marvel called life." The reviewer of Sify.com gave the verdict as "Good" and said, "Bangalore Days is a young, vibrant film that is colourful and peppy." Krishnanunni U. of Oneindia.in rated the film 4 in a scale of 5 and described it as a "perfect youth entertainer." Aswin J Kumar of The Times of India wrote, "Bangalore Days might not be charming as a whole, still Anjali shows intent in knitting together family bonds in purely comic vein, throwing up characters like a wife and husband who just drift apart from each other out of love for independent life. This is a film that talks cheerfully about love and hope," and rated the film 3.5 in a scale of 5. Paresh C Palicha of Rediff.com wrote, "The first feature film Anjali Menon directed was Manjadikuru where children get a perplexed view of the adult world. Bangalore Days can be seen as an extension of that, where those children are grown up but still want to hold on to their childhood." He gave the film 3 out of 5 stars.

=== Box office ===
The film collected ₹8.5 crore (US$880,000) in its first week. The film grossed £100,670 (₹ 1.03 crore) within 1 month, and $180,217 (₹ 1.34 crore) in its final run from the UK box office.

The film's total gross collection was about ₹48 - 50 crore worldwide, making it the highest grossing Malayalam film of the year and one of the highest grossing Malayalam films of all time. The film ran for a hundred days in four centres in Chennai and two months in Hyderabad.

== Awards and nominations ==
Award	Date of ceremony (Note: Date is linked to the article about the awards held that year, wherever possible.)	Category	Recipient(s)	Result	Ref.
Asianet Film Awards	11 January 2015	Best Popular film	Bangalore Days	Won	
Asianet Film Awards	11 January 2015	Best Director	Anjali Menon	Won	
Asianet Film Awards	11 January 2015	Star of The Year	Dulquer Salmaan	Won	
Asianet Film Awards	11 January 2015	Performer of The Year	Fahadh Faasil	Won	
Asianet Film Awards	11 January 2015	Best Supporting Actress	Parvathy Thiruvothu	Won	
Asianet Film Awards	11 January 2015	Best Music Director	Gopi Sundar	Won	
Asianet Film Awards	11 January 2015	Best Lyricist	Rafeeq Ahamed ("Ethu Kari Raavilum")	Won	
Asianet Film Awards	11 January 2015	Best Male Playback Singer	Haricharan ("Ethu Kari Raavilum")	Won	
Asiavision Awards	14 November 2014	Best Entertaining Movie	Bangalore Days (Anjali Menon)	Won	
Asiavision Awards	14 November 2014	Performer of The Year - Male	Dulquer Salmaan	Won	
Asiavision Awards	14 November 2014	Star of The Year – Male	Nivin Pauly	Won	
Asiavision Awards	14 November 2014	Star of the Year - Female	Nazriya Nazim	Won	
Asiavision Awards	14 November 2014	New Sensation in Acting	Parvathy Thiruvothu	Won	
Asiavision Awards	14 November 2014	Best Music Director	Gopi Sundar	Won	
Asiavision Awards	14 November 2014	Best Cinematographer	Sameer Thahir	Won	
Filmfare Awards South	26 June 2015	Best Film – Malayalam	Bangalore Days	Nominated	
Filmfare Awards South	26 June 2015	Best Director – Malayalam	Anjali Menon	Won	
Filmfare Awards South	26 June 2015	Best Supporting Actor – Malayalam	Fahadh Faasil	Nominated	
Filmfare Awards South	26 June 2015	Best Supporting Actress – Malayalam	Parvathy Thiruvothu	Won	
Filmfare Awards South	26 June 2015	Best Music Director – Malayalam	Gopi Sundar	Won	
Filmfare Awards South	26 June 2015	Best Male Playback Singer – Malayalam	Haricharan ("Ethu Kari Raavilum")	Won	
Filmfare Awards South	26 June 2015	Best Male Playback Singer – Malayalam	Vijay Yesudas & Sachin Warrier ("Thudakkam Mangalyam")	Nominated	
Kerala State Film Awards	10 August 2015	Best Actor	Nivin Pauly	Won	
Kerala State Film Awards	10 August 2015	Best Actress	Nazriya Nazim	Won (Note: Nazriya also won it for Ohm Shanthi Oshaana)	
Kerala State Film Awards	10 August 2015	Best Screenplay (Original)	Anjali Menon	Won	
South Indian International Movie Awards	6—7 August 2015	Best Film – Malayalam	Bangalore Days	Won	
South Indian International Movie Awards	6—7 August 2015	Best Debut Producer – Malayalam	Anwar Rasheed & Sophia Paul	Won	
South Indian International Movie Awards	6—7 August 2015	Best Director – Malayalam	Anjali Menon	Won	
South Indian International Movie Awards	6—7 August 2015	Best Cinematographer – Malayalam	Sameer Thahir	Nominated	
South Indian International Movie Awards	6—7 August 2015	Best Supporting Actress – Malayalam	Parvathy Thiruvothu	Won	
South Indian International Movie Awards	6—7 August 2015	Best Music Director – Malayalam	Gopi Sundar	Won	
South Indian International Movie Awards	6—7 August 2015	Best Lyricist – Malayalam	Rafeeq Ahamed ("Ethu Kari Raavilum")	Nominated	
South Indian International Movie Awards	6—7 August 2015	Best Male Playback Singer – Malayalam	Haricharan ("Ethu Kari Raavilum")	Nominated	
South Indian International Movie Awards	6—7 August 2015	Best Dance Choreographer – Malayalam	Brinda ("Thudakkam Mangalyam")	Nominated	
Vanitha Film Awards	15 February 2015	Most Popular Actress	Nazriya Nazim	Won	
Vanitha Film Awards	15 February 2015	Popular Song of the Year	"Mangalyam Thanthunanena"	Won	

== Remakes ==
The film was remade in Tamil as Bangalore Naatkal (2016), and in Hindi as Yaariyan 2 (2023).

Role	Malayalam (Original)	Tamil (Remake)	Hindi (Remake)
Kuttan	Nivin Pauly	Bobby Simha	Pearl V Puri
Aju	Dulquer Salmaan	Arya	Meezaan Jafri
Divya	Nazriya Nazim	Sri Divya	Divya Khosla Kumar
Das	Fahadh Faasil	Rana Daggubati	Yash Dasgupta
Aju's love	Parvathy Thiruvothu	Parvathy Thiruvothu	Anaswara Rajan
Kuttan's love	Isha Talwar	Raai Laxmi	Warina Hussain
Kuttan's wife	Paris Laxmi	Paris Laxmi	Priya Prakash Varrier

== Legacy ==
Nazriya Nazim's Divya is considered among the strongest female roles in Malayalam films. Publications such as The Hindu and Mathrubhumi have listed it as one of the best Malayalam film of the decade.

Sowmya Rajendran from The News Minute noted: "Bangalore Days was that rare urban Malayalam film which was authentic in dialogue and characterisation. It didn't fall into the trap of pretentiousness in trying to represent life in a metropolis. Instead, the film made the city its heart and soul and gave us real characters with believable histories." Gopika Prakash of The Week stated: "The film had fresh narrative style, actors in credible roles and offered fresh and relatable stories. Bangalore Days set a benchmark and ushered a new era for Malayalam cinema." Jisha Ponnachan of Film Companion noted: "Bangalore Days is a timeless experience, that will make you laugh and cry heartily. The film is a gentle push for us to embrace our present, rejoice in our familial bonds and to dream without limits."
