= Scene (2026 film) =

Indian film by Jithu Madhavan

- Theatrical release poster
- Directed by: Jithu Madhavan
- Written by: Jithu Madhavan
- Dialogues by: Dravid Selvam
- Produced by: Suriya; Jyothika; Jaishree Damodaran
- Starring: Suriya; Naslen; Nazriya Nazim
- Cinematography: Vineeth Augustian
- Edited by: Ajmal Sabu
- Music by: Sushin Shyam
- Production companies: Zhagaram Studios; 2D Entertainment
- Distributed by: Sakthi Film Factory
- Release date: 6 November 2026
- Running time: 149 minutes
- Country: India
- Language: Tamil
- Budget: est. ₹30 crore
- Box office: est. ₹260.60 crore

Scene is a 2026 Indian Tamil-language action comedy film written and directed by Jithu Madhavan. Produced by Suriya and Jyothika's 2D Entertainment and the newly established Zhagaram Studios, the film stars Suriya, Naslen and Nazriya Nazim, with Anandaraj, Lal, Rajpriyan, Suresh Mathiyalagan and Gajaraj in supporting roles. It revolves around a visually-impaired DSP being forced to reopen an unfinished case and solve it with a troublesome team.

The film was officially announced in December 2025 under the tentative title Suriya 47, denoting the actor's 47th film in a leading role. Principal photography commenced the same month and took place predominantly in Chennai and Kerala, before wrapping in July 2026. The official title was revealed the following September. The film has music composed by Sushin Shyam, cinematography handled by Vineeth Augustian and editing by Ajmal Sabu. It is the Tamil debut of Jithu, Naslen and Sushin, and marks Nazriya's return to Tamil cinema after 12 years.

Scene was released on 6 November 2026, in the week of Diwali and received mostly positive reviews from critics with praise for the cast performances, humour, screenplay, writing, Sushin's music and technical aspects. It has grossed over ₹260 crore (US$28 million) worldwide, making it one of the highest-grossing Tamil films of 2026.

== Plot ==
In Idukki, a group arrives to a cemetery to bury the body of person they accidentally killed. There, they notice a boy who tries to run away but is captured and tied up. They plan to kill him but realise that he, too, had come there to bury a body, that of his father whom he murdered. He helps them bury the body and they release him. The boy, Eeswaran, asks them to call him for such cases in future.

In the present in Chennai, DSP Inbaraj "Inba", a celebrated police officer, submits his resignation but his senior, Stephen, is reluctant to accept it. Meanwhile, a body is found in a sugarcane field and Inspector Vinoth identifies it to be a victim of the "Perfume Killer", a case that was considered closed after Inbaraj arrested the psycho killer, Victor. Believing Victor might be innocent, Stephen and Vinoth meet him, but he claims full responsibility for the murders that he committed and demands to meet Inba.

With Stephen and Vinoth watching through a monitor, Inba meets Victor who reveals that Inba is blind. Stephen and Vinoth are shocked by this revelation, especially since Inba solved multiple major cases. Inba explains that for the past five years, his vision had been gradually declining, with him only being able to see only about 10% at present. He explains how many of his actions, which made him seem arrogant were, in fact, measures to mask his blindess and subsequently the reason for his resignation. Stephen agrees to accept his resignation, but Inba takes a resolution to only resign after catching the killer who exposed his carefully concealed secret. However, Stephen forbids Inba from investigating the case and appoints Vinoth to monitor his activities.

A rising television star gets into a conflict with his girlfriend and beats her unconscious. To protect his reputation, he hires Eeswaran, who makes it seem as a murder committed by the perfume killer. Meanwhile, Inba advertises for a house help, but in reality, he is searching for an investigation assistant. He hires Maya, an intelligent woman who suffer from episodes of epilepsy to be his "eyes". He also recruits his father, Irudhayaraj, a former forensic surgeon suffering from memory loss, and his alcoholic mother Selvi, a brilliant criminologist, to help him with the case. They deduce that the first murder was actually a decoy to make the second murder appear as a part of a killing spree, removing suspicion from the girl's acquaintances like her boyfriend.

As the team narrows down to Eeswaran's accomplices, Eeswaran finds out the truth about Inba's blindness while trying to kill him using his drone and uses it to his advantage. Inba uses the help of the police force to capture the second accomplice of Eeswaran and are shocked to learn that Eeswaran has committed over a hundred murders. They lock the city to prevent his escape. Eeswaran arrives at Inba's home, ties up Maya and easily evades Inba's attacks by toying with him and attacks him. Vinod, having been reprimanded by Stephen for leaving Inba alone with a serial killer on the loose, orders him to go back to Inba's house, however, Irudhayaraj asserts that Eeswaran is, in fact, at the mercy of Inba, as Inba had set up his house in a specific way that enables him to deduce his surroundings to his advantage along with the help of Alexa. He ungags Maya and with her help, successfully subdues Eeswaran and hands him over to the police. The abusive boyfriend is also captured by the police.

During their investigation, Inba and Maya had fallen for each other. Listening to Maya's advice, Inba comes to terms with his blindess, adopting a white cane and smartglasses. Just as they think everything is finally over, news of Victor's escape arrives, prompting them to action again.

== Cast ==
- Suriya as DSP Inbaraj "Inba" Irudhayaraj IPS
- Naslen as Eeswaran
- Nazriya Nazim as Maya
  - Tanishka Mohan as young Maya
- Anandaraj as Irudhayaraj, Inba's father
- Lal as Stephen
- Rajpriyan as Inspector Sibi
- Suresh Mathiyalagan as Inspector Vinoth
- Gajaraj as Manohar, Maya's father
- Anuradha Sridhar as Selvi Irudhayaraj, Inba's mother

Special appearances

- Tovino Thomas as Victor
- Jyothika as Inba's imagination of Maya

== Production ==
=== Development ===
In June 2025, Malayalam director Jithu Madhavan confirmed that he was in discussions with actor Suriya to direct his 47th film as a lead actor. The project was in its early stages, and Jithu did not disclose further details. The film marks his debut as a director in Tamil cinema. It was reported that Suriya would launch a new production company, named Zhagaram Studios, with the project set to be its first production. Reports also stated that several crew members from Jithu's shelved project with Mohanlal, including cinematographer Vineeth Augustian, were expected to join the film. Pre-production work for the film commenced in August 2025, following the completion of filming for Karuppu (2026), and was completed by the following December.

The film, tentatively titled Suriya 47, began with a muhurat puja in Chennai on 7 December 2025. It was produced by Suriya and Jyothika's newly established Zhagaram Studios, along with their production company 2D Entertainment. The production companies officially announced the project the same day and released photographs from the ceremony, which confirmed the cast and crew. The film also marked the Tamil debut of Malayalam composer Sushin Shyam. Jithu wrote and directed the film, while Dravid Selvam contributed to the Tamil dialogues and additional writing. Sushin, who had previously collaborated with Jithu on Romancham (2023) and Aavesham (2024), composed the music, marking their third collaboration. Ajmal Sabu debuted as editor with this film. The production budget was reportedly around ₹30 crore (US$3.2 million), excluding Suriya's remuneration. The film's official title was announced on 9 September 2026.

=== Casting ===
Suriya plays a DSP in the film, marking his return to playing one after previously doing so in the Singam film series. Jithu revealed that the story was initially written with Fahadh Faasil in mind for the lead role. Malayalam actor Naslen, in his Tamil debut, was chosen as the antagonist as Jithu wanted someone who people would think is "the last to commit a gruesome crime". He initially believed Naslen would not accept given that he was doing primarily lead roles, but the actor did so, and although there were minor scheduling conflicts, they were worked around. In September 2025, Nazriya Nazim was reported to be in discussions to play the lead actress paired opposite Suriya. The pairing had previously been planned for Sudha Kongara's Purananooru; however, the film was retooled as Parasakthi (2026) with a different cast.

Nazriya and Naslen were officially announced as part of the cast on 7 December 2025. It marks Nazriya's return to Tamil cinema after a 12-year hiatus, her last Tamil film being Thirumanam Enum Nikkah (2014). Suriya noted that Nazriya had previously declined to act opposite him in three films before accepting this one. In response, Nazriya called Suriya's comments a "joke", noting that the aforementioned collaborations did not materialise because of scheduling issues, and she would never purposefully reject a Suriya film. Anuradha Sridhar, wife of dance choreographer Sridhar, was cast after Jithu's wife Shifina, a casting director, noticed Anuradha in her daughter Akshadha's reels. Rajpriyan, a YouTuber, made his feature film debut as did Suresh Mathiyalagan, who Jithu noticed through social media videos.

=== Filming ===
Principal photography began in December 2025. Reports initially stated that the first schedule would begin in Kerala on 8 December, while the production's launch ceremony had taken place the previous day. Most of the filming was expected to take place in Kochi. By February 2026, filming was ongoing, with Jithu describing it as a "proper Tamil film" when questioned if it would have a "Malayalam flavour". Nazriya joined the production in March 2026. Suriya and Jyothika welcomed her to the set. Nazriya reportedly began her portions with an action sequence in Chennai, choreographed by Chethan D'Souza, with a set built in VGN Cosmos in Avadi. Dravid Selvam was involved throughout the shoot as a dialogue writer, and said in July 2026 that he had been working on the film's set every day. Principal photography was completed in July 2026. The production houses announced the wrap on 16 July.

== Music ==
The soundtrack is composed by Sushin Shyam, in his third collaboration with Jithu and his Tamil debut. The audio rights were acquired by Sony Music. The audio launch was held on 31 October 2026 at Sri Sairam Engineering College, Chennai, while the complete album was released on 5 November 2026.

== Marketing ==
The title teaser for this film was released on 9 September 2026. The promotional teaser, introducing Naslen's character was released on 22 October 2026. An major promotional event titled #SceneLiveInDubai took place on 25 October 2026 at Silicon Central Mall in Dubai. At the event, a new promotional teaser featuring Suriya's character introduction was exclusively premiered. Later, the teaser was released digitally the next day. The film's trailer was released on 31 October 2026 along with the audio launch.

== Release ==
=== Theatrical ===
Scene was released on 6 November 2026, the week of Diwali, clashing with Mookuthi Amman 2.

=== Distribution ===
Sakthi Film Factory distributed Scene in Tamil Nadu, and Sree Gokulam Movies is the Kerala distributor. M Movies is handling the theatrical distribution of this film in the state of Karnataka. Distribution in the states of Andhra Pradesh and Telangana is handled by NVR Cinema. SVC Release is handling the distribution of this film in the Nizam region.

The overseas distribution rights for the film, including the GCC region, have been acquired by Phars Films. Other distributors for this film include York Cinemas (North America), Home Screen Entertainment (Australia, New Zealand, Papua New Guinea, Fiji, and Singapore), MSK Cinemas Sdn Bhd (Malaysia), Ahimsa Entertainment (UK and Europe), and 180 Entertainment and Getam Cine World (France), and Linus Media (Benelux).

=== Home media ===
The post-theatrical streaming rights were acquired by Netflix.

== Reception ==
=== Box office ===
Before the film's release, industry insider Ramesh Bala predicted that its opening-day box office in India would exceed ₹20 crore. On the day of the film's release, the early screenings performed impressively, with an average occupancy rate of around 60%. As a result, the total box office collection for the opening day reached approximately ₹19.15 crore, with ₹16.15 crore coming from the Tamil version, marking an impressive performance and securing the third spot among the highest opening-day figures of Suriya's career. In overseas markets, the film grossed ₹12 crore on its opening day, bringing its global box office total to ₹34.25 crore. On 9 November, the film surpassed the 100 crore benchmark within four days of its release, grossing over ₹116 crore (US$12 million) worldwide, including ₹62 crore (US$6.6 million) domestically. Shortly thereafter it grossed over ₹200 crore (US$21 million) before the end of the week, becoming Suriya's third successive film after Karuppu and Vishwanath & Sons to do so.

=== Critical response ===
Scene received mostly positive reviews from critics.

M. Suganth of The Times of India rated the film 4/5, saying it "take[s] some time to settle into its unique rhythm. The opening portions that set up this world are rather flat but from the moment it reveals its protagonist's weakness, the film starts getting into the groove". Vishal Menon of The Hollywood Reporter India wrote, "Thanks to an in-form Suriya, Naslen and Nazriya, director Jithu Madhavan dares to venture into territory that might seem too risky for a film with such serious undertones". Janani K of India Today said it "is as funny and clever as it can get. While it starts on a subdued note, it blows your mind as it progresses". Latha Srinivasan of NDTV lauded the music, cinematography, editing, dark humour and direction, calling Scene "refreshingly different from recent Tamil films".

Bhuvanesh Chandar of The Hindu wrote, "Scene is an engaging and entertaining dark comedy with so much going for it that choosing its most satisfying highlight is a difficult exercise". Yashaswini Sri of The Indian Express wrote, "Scene is not Jithu Madhavan's strongest work. [...] But Scene is a film with genuine vision, real personality and a lead performance that reminds you what Suriya is capable of when a director gives him permission to be human rather than heroic". Bryan Durham of Variety India wrote, "this is one you CANNOT miss in theatres. It doesn't just keep you invested in the murder mystery at the heart of the story, it is entertaining to the core". Baradwaj Rangan wrote that "the film subverts every cliché in the storytelling book, and we get 'scene' after unexpected 'scene', which play out in tone after unexpected tone. The ambition is admirable, but the film takes too long to take off and ends up working only in parts".

Avinash Ramachandran of Cinema Express rated the film 4/5, writing, "With Suriya in terrific form and stellar turns from Nazriya and Naslen, Jithu Madhavan gives the familiar a fabulous makeover in Scene". Neeshita Nyayapati of Hindustan Times rated the film 3.5/5, writing, "Given the seriousness of the core story of Scene, this film could've gone either way. But Jithu remains sensitive and punches up instead of down, leaving you with a Diwali film that crackles". Jagadish Angadi of Deccan Herald gave a less positive review and 2.5/5 rating, criticising the "sluggish narration" of the film's first half but said it "picks up pace" post interval. Jagadish said both the cinematography and music were "fairly average", but praised two stunt sequences and the performances of Suriya and Naslen, saying the latter "steals the show".
