= 62nd Filmfare Awards South =

South Indian cinema awards

- Date: 26 June 2015
- Site: Chennai, Tamil Nadu, India
- Hosted by: VJ Ramya
- Produced by: Britannia

Highlights
- Best Picture: Mr. and Mrs. Ramachari (Kannada); Munnariyippu (Malayalam); Kaththi (Tamil); Manam (Telugu)
- Most awards: Manam (5; Telugu)
- Most nominations: Kaaviyathalaivan (eleven, Tamil); Manam (ten, Telugu); Ulidavaru Kandanthe (eight; Kannada)

The 62nd Filmfare Awards South ceremony honouring the winners and nominees of the best of South Indian cinema in 2014 was an event held on 26 June 2015 at the Nehru Indoor Stadium in Chennai.

== Awards and nominees ==
=== Main awards ===
The winners are listed first, highlighted in boldface.

==== Kannada cinema ====
Best Film	Best Director
**Mr. and Mrs. Ramachari**; Drishya; Gajakesari; Ugramm; Ulidavaru Kandanthe	**Rakshit Shetty** – **Ulidavaru Kandanthe**; Prakash Raj – Oggarane; Prashanth Neel – Ugramm; S. Krishna- Gajakesari; Santhosh Ananddram – Mr. and Mrs. Ramachari
Best Actor	Best Actress
**Yash** – **Mr. and Mrs. Ramachari**; Puneeth Rajkumar – Power; Rakshit Shetty – Ulidavaru Kandanthe; Sharan – Adyaksha; Srimurali – Ugramm	**Shwetha Srivatsav** – **Fair & Lovely**; Haripriya – Ugramm; Kriti Kharbanda – Super Ranga; Radhika Pandit – Mr. and Mrs. Ramachari; Ragini Dwivedi – Ragini IPS
Best Supporting Actor	Best Supporting Actress
**Achyuth Kumar** – **Drishya**; Harish Raj – Power; Kishore – Ulidavaru Kandanthe; Thilak – Ugramm; V. Ravichandran – Maanikya	**Samyukta Hornad** – **Oggarane**; Asha Sarath – Drishya; Malavika – Mr. and Mrs. Ramachari; Padmaja Rao – Ugramm; Sumithra – Shivajinagara
Best Music Director	Best Lyricist
**B. Ajaneesh Loknath – Ulidavaru Kandanthe**; Arjun Janya – Adyaksha; Mani Sharma – Ninnindale; Ravi Basrur – Ugramm; V. Harikrishna – Mr. and Mrs. Ramachari	**V. Nagendra Prasad – "Kannalli" from Ambareesha**; K. Kalyan – "Jeeva Jeeva" from Maanikya; Kaviraj – "Ninte Ninte" from Ninnindale; Rakshit Shetty – "Gaatiya Ilidu" from Ulidavaru Kandanthe; Yogaraj Bhat – "Open Hairu" from Adyaksha
Best Playback Singer – Male	Best Playback Singer – Female
**Vijay Prakash** – **"Gatiya Ilidu" from Ulidavaru Kandanthe**; Kailash Kher – "Ee Janumave Aaha" from Oggarane; Puneeth Rajkumar – "Guruvara Sanje" from Power; Sonu Nigam – "Ringagide Nan Yede" from Fair & Lovely; Yash – "Anthamma" from Mr. and Mrs. Ramachari	**Anuradha Bhat** – **"Chanchana Chanchana" from Ugramm**; Archana Ravi – "Kannalle Kannige" from Adyaksha; Malathi – "Pantara Panta" from Maanikya; Shreya Ghoshal – "Kaakig Banna Kantha" from Ulidavaru Kandanthe; Sinchana Dixit – "Currentu Hoda Timealli" from Love in Mandya

==== Malayalam cinema ====
Best Film	Best Director
**Munnariyippu**; 1983; Apothecary; Bangalore Days; How Old Are You?	**Anjali Menon** – **Bangalore Days**; Abrid Shine – 1983; Ranjith – Njaan; Rosshan Andrrews- How Old Are You?; Venu – Munnariyippu
Best Actor	Best Actress
**Mammootty** – **Varsham**; Biju Menon – Vellimoonga; Dulquer Salman – Njaan; Nivin Pauly – 1983; Suresh Gopi – Apothecary	**Manju Warrier** – **How Old Are You?**; Anusree – Ithihasa; Aparna Gopinath – Munnariyippu; Asha Sarath – Varsham; Nazriya Nazim – Om Shanti Oshana
Best Supporting Actor	Best Supporting Actress
**Jayasurya** – **Apothecary**; Anup Menon – Vikramadithyan; Fahad Fazil – Bangalore Days; Lal – Iyobinte Pusthakam; Siddique – Swapaanam	**Parvathy Thiruvothu – Bangalore Days**; Muthumani – Njaan; Lena – Vikramadithyan; Sajitha Madathil – Njaan; Sethulakshmi – How Old Are You?
Best Music Director	Best Lyricist
**Gopi Sunder** – **Bangalore Days**; Bijibal – Vikramadithyan; Neha Nair and Yakzan Pereira – Iyobinte Pusthakam; Sham Rahman – Om Shanti Oshana; Sreevalsan Menon – Swapaanam	**BK Harinarayanan – "Olanjali Kuruvi" from 1983**; Anwar Ali – "Theruvukal Nee" from Njaan; BK Harinarayanan – "Kattu Mooliyo" from Om Shanti Oshana; Manoj Kuroor – "Madhava Masamo" from Swapaanam; Vayalar Sarath – "Manasin Thinkale" from Vikramadithyan
Best Playback Singer – Male	Best Playback Singer – Female
**Haricharan** – **"Ethu Kari Ravilum" from Bangalore Days**; Haricharan – "Kannadi Vathil" from London Bridge; Siddharth Menon – "Theruvukal Nee" from Njaan; Vijay Yesudas & Sachin Warrier – "Thudakkam Mangalyam" from Bangalore Days; Vineeth Srinivasan – "Kattu Mooliyo" from Om Shanti Oshana	**Shreya Ghoshal** – **"Vijanathayil" from How Old Are You?**; B. Arundhathi – "Maara Sannibho" from Swapaanam; Shweta Mohan – "Onaam Kombath" from Ottamandaram; Sujatha Mohan – "Elampoo Vazhi" from Ottamandaram; Vani Jayaram – "Olenjil Kuruvi" from 1983

==== Tamil cinema ====
Best Film	Best Director
**Kaththi**; Kaaviyathalaivan; Madras; Mundasupatti; Velaiyilla Pattathari	**A. R. Murugadoss** – **Kaththi**; Pa. Ranjith – Madras; Ramkumar – Mundasupatti; Vasanthabalan – Kaaviyathalaivan; Velraj – Velaiyilla Pattathari
Best Actor	Best Actress
**Dhanush** – **Velaiyilla Pattathari**; Ajith Kumar – Veeram; Karthi – Madras; Prithviraj Sukumaran – Kaaviyathalaivan; Vijay – Kaththi	**Malavika Nair** – **Cuckoo**; Amala Paul – Velaiyilla Pattathari; Catherine Tresa – Madras; Samantha – Kaththi; Vedhicka – Kaaviyathalaivan
Best Supporting Actor	Best Supporting Actress
**Bobby Simha** – **Jigarthanda**; Kalaiyarasan – Madras; Siddharth – Kaaviyathalaivan; Samuthirakani – Velaiyilla Pattathari; Thambi Ramaiah – Kathai Thiraikathai Vasanam Iyakkam	**Riythvika – Madras**; Anaika Soti – Kaaviyathalaivan; Kovai Sarala – Aranmanai; Saranya Ponvannan – Velaiyilla Pattathari; Seetha – Goli Soda
Best Music Director	Best Lyricist
**Anirudh Ravichander** – **Velaiyilla Pattathari**; Anirudh Ravichander – Kaththi; Anirudh Ravichander – Maan Karate; A. R. Rahman – Kaaviyathalaivan; Santhosh Narayanan – Madras	**Na. Muthukumar** – **"Azhagu" from Saivam**; Madhan Karky – "Selfie Pulla" from Kaththi; Pa. Vijay – "Yarumilla" from Kaaviyathalaivan; Vairamuthu – "Ovvondrai Thirudigirai" from Jeeva; Yugabharathi – "Manasula Soorakathu" from Cuckoo
Best Playback Singer – Male	Best Playback Singer – Female
**Pradeep Kumar – "Aagayam Theepiditha" from Madras**; Anirudh Ravichander – "Un Vizhigalil" from Maan Karate; Haricharan – "Hey Sandikuthirai" from Kaaviyathalaivan; Karthik – "Ovvondrai Thirudigirai" from Jeeva; Vijay – "Selfie Pulla" from Kaththi	**Uthara Unnikrishnan** – **"Azhagu" from Saivam**; Bhavya Pandit – "Ovvondrai Thirudigirai" from Jeeva; Sakthisree Gopalan & Dhee – "Naan Nee" from Madras; Swetha Mohan- "Yaarumilla" from Kaaviyathalaivan; Vandana Srinivasan – "Unna Ippa" from Kayal

==== Telugu cinema ====
Best Film	Best Director
**Manam**; Drushyam; Karthikeya; Race Gurram; Run Raja Run	**Vikram Kumar** – **Manam**; Chandoo Mondeti – Karthikeya; Sripriya – Drushyam; Sujeeth – Run Raja Run; Surender Reddy – Race Gurram
Best Actor	Best Actress
**Allu Arjun** – **Race Gurram**; Mohan Babu – Rowdy; Nagarjuna – Manam; Sharwanand – Run Raja Run; Venkatesh – Drushyam	**Shruti Haasan** – **Race Gurram**; Kajal Aggarwal – Govindudu Andarivadele; Pooja Hegde – Oka Laila Kosam; Rakul Preet Singh – Loukyam; Samantha – Manam
Best Supporting Actor	Best Supporting Actress
**Jagapathi Babu** – **Legend**; Ajay – Dikkulu Choodaku Ramayya; Prakash Raj – Govindudu Andarivadele; Sai Kumar – Yevadu; Srikanth – Govindudu Andarivadele	**Lakshmi Manchu** – **Chandamama Kathalu**; Jayasudha – Rowdy; Karthika Nair – Brother of Bommali; Nadiya Moidu – Drushyam; Shriya Saran – Manam
Best Music Director	Best Lyricist
**Anoop Rubens** – **Manam**; Devi Sri Prasad – Yevadu; M. Ghibran – Run Raja Run; Kalyan Koduri – Oohalu Gusagusalade; S. Thaman – Race Gurram	**Chandrabose** – **"Kanipinchina Maa Ammake" from Manam**; Anantha Sreeram – "Yem Sandeham Ledu" from Oohalu Gusagusalade; Krishna Chaitanya – "Aa Seetadevi Navvula" from Rowdy Fellow; Vanamali – "Saripovu Koti" from Karthikeya; Vanamali – "Kanulanu Thake" from Manam
Best Playback Singer – Male	Best Playback Singer – Female
**Simha – "Cinema Choopista" from Race Gurram**; Arijit Singh – "Kanulanu Thake" from Manam; Haricharan – "Saripovu Koti" from Karthikeya; Hariharan – "Neelirangu" from Govindudu Andarivadele; Hemachandra – "Intakante" from Oohalu Gusagusalade	**Sunitha Upadrashta** – **"Yem Sandeham Ledu" from Oohalu Gusagusalade**; Chinmayi – "Ra Rakumara" from Govindudu Andarivadele; Neha Bhasin – "Aww Tujho Moh" from Nenokkadine; Shreya Ghoshal – "Chinni Chinni Aasalu" from Manam; Shruthi Haasan – "Junction Lo" from Aagadu

=== Technical Awards ===
Best Cinematographer – South
- **P. S. Vinod** – Manam
Best Choreography
- **Sobhi** – Kaththi

=== Special awards ===
Lifetime Achievement
- **IV Sasi** (Director)
- **Radhika Sarathkumar** (Actress)
Critics Best Actor
- **Karthi (Tamil) for** **Madras**
- **Nivin Pauly (Malayalam) for** **1983**
Best Male Debut
- **Bellamkonda Sreenivas for** **Alludu Seenu**
- **Dulquer Salman for** **Vaayai Moodi Pesavum**
Best Female Debut
- **Nikki Galrani for** **1983**
- **Catherine Tresa for** **Madras**
