= Nonsense (film) =

- Directed by: M. C. Jithin
- Screenplay by: M. C. Jithin; Libin T. B. Mohammed Shafeek
- Story by: M. C. Jithin
- Produced by: Johny Sagariga
- Starring: Rinosh George; Vinay Forrt; Shruthi Ramachandran; Febia V. Mathew; Kalabhavan Shajohn; Giriprasad Damodar; Anil Nedumangad
- Cinematography: Alex J. Pulickal
- Edited by: Appu Bhattathiri
- Music by: Rinosh George; Vishnu Shyam (Score)
- Production company: Johny Sagariga
- Distributed by: BAROQUE
- Release date: 12 October 2018
- Running time: 148 minutes
- Country: India
- Language: Malayalam

Nonsense is a 2018 Indian Malayalam-language sports thriller film co-written and directed by M. C. Jithin and produced by Johny Sagariga. It features Rinosh George in the lead role, who also composed and sang the film's original songs. The film featured many bicycle stunt scenes and is the first Indian film to feature BMX bicycle sport.

It bombed at the box office due to the absence of promotions as well as the producer cheating, resulting in his arrest.

== Plot ==
Arun, a teenager was orphaned at a young age and is taken care by his grandfather. Though, Arun is backward at studies in his school, He likes thinking practical. However, his teachers misunderstands that he cannot study. Especially, his physics teacher Sheena calls him a 'nonsense'. One morning, Arun had befriended an auto driver named Santhosh, after he dropped him to school.

One day, the students of his school are asked to leave because of bandh. While, leaving Sheena asks her colleague, Lakshmi to take care of her daughter, Jesna while she is away. Lakshmi leaves Jesna in the beauty parlour reception. Bored, Jesna sneaks out and finds Arun. Jesna recognises him and befriends him. However, a car hits Jesna. Alarmed, Arun takes her to the hospital with the help of Santhosh.

Things take a turn when the doctor reveals that Jesna has lost a lot of blood and Jesna needs a unit of A− Negative blood. Arun and Santhosh struggles to search anyone who has A− Negative blood. Meanwhile, Lakshmi has discovered what happened and rushes to the hospital after calling Sheena. Finally, Santhosh reveals that he has A− Negative blood type and never said about it as he was scared. After returning to hospital Santhosh donates his blood. Jesna is saved.

Back in school, Sheena reprimands Arun for not completing his homeworks. Arun agrees to complete his homework. Before leaving, Sheena thanks Arun for saving her daughter's life. The film ends with the class leader of Arun's class, writing on the board, a quote by Dr. A. P. J. Abdul Kalam: The best brains of the world may be found on the last benches of the classroom indicating Arun, who was in last bench of his class.

== Cast ==
- Rinosh George as Arun Jeevan
- Febia V. Mathew as Head Girl and also a Classmate
- Sreenath Babu as Ajesh Mathew
- Shruthi Ramachandran as Sheena Miss Arun's Original Mother
- Vinay Forrt as Santhosh (Auto Driver)
- Kalabhavan Shajohn as PT Sir
- Urmila Unni as Principal
- Baby Alma as Jesna Nissam
- Sanju Sivram as Nissam (Sheena Miss Husband)
- Shreegopika Neelanath as Rose (Classmate)
- Fahim Safar
- Balaji Sarma as Manoj
- Anil Nedumagad as Sudhy
- Lalu Alex as Surgeon Doctor
- Divya Prabha as Nurse
- Abu Valyamkulam
- Santhakumari as K. P. Annamma
- Gilu Joseph as Biology Miss
- Sarjano Khalid
- Sreeja as Lekshmi Miss
- Veena as Library Miss
- Sunaina as Malayalam Miss
- Annul Pale as himself (Cameo appearance)

== Production ==
Debutant director M. C. Jithin, who was an associate of Abrid Shine, wanted to cast Rinosh George, a DJ and musician, in the lead role. The two had worked together on Rinosh's first music video. He received many rejections from production houses based on the title (Nonsense) and the unknown cast. The project was approved by Johny Sagarika Production House, which produced many hit Malayalam movies, after Rinosh George gained popularity for his music video "I'm A Mallu".

This is the first film in India to feature BMX cycling sport. The movie has many stunt scenes, leading the makers to call it a "sports thriller."

== Soundtrack ==
Beside starring, Rinosh George also composed and sang the film's original songs. The soundtracks consists of three songs written by Vinayak Sasikumar, the songs were released by the music label Johny Sagariga on 17 October 2018. The film's score was composed by Vishnu Shyam.

No.	Title	Length
1.	"Chirakukal Njan Tharam"	2:59
2.	"Pularnila Kasavumayi"	3:38
3.	"They Call Me Nonsense"	2:23

== Release ==
The film was released on 12 October 2018.

== Critical reception ==
The Times of India rated 3 out of 5 stars, calling it "an immensely watchable film, made by a director with promise (MC Jithin, who identifies himself as MC in the titles), with dialogues by a writer with an impeccable sense of humour."
