= Ohm Shanthi Oshaana =

- Film Poster
- Directed by: Jude Anthany Joseph
- Screenplay by: Midhun Manuel Thomas; Jude Anthany Joseph
- Story by: Midhun Manuel Thomas
- Produced by: Alvin Antony
- Starring: Nazriya Nazim; Nivin Pauly
- Narrated by: Salim Kumar
- Cinematography: Vinod Illampally
- Edited by: Lijo Paul
- Music by: Shaan Rahman
- Production company: Ananya Films
- Distributed by: PJ Entertainments (Europe) Tricolor Entertainments (Asia Pacific)
- Release date: 7 February 2014
- Running time: 125 minutes
- Country: India
- Language: Malayalam
- Box office: est. ₹10.3 crore

Ohm Shanthi Oshaana is a 2014 Indian Malayalam-language coming-of-age romantic comedy film co-written and directed by Jude Anthany Joseph (in his directorial debut). The story was conceived by Midhun Manuel Thomas and he wrote the screenplay along with Joseph. The film stars Nazriya Nazim snd Nivin Pauly with Vineeth , Renji Panicker and Aju Varghese. It was produced by Ananya Films and features music by Shaan Rahman.

Ohm Shanthi Oshaana was released on 7 February 2014 with positive reviews from critics, with praises towards Nazriya's and Nivin's performances, the music and screenplay. A major commercial success, it became one of the highest grossing film of the year.

Va Va Nilave (Aka: Vaa Vaa Nilave) is a Tamil dubbed version, available online.

At the 45th Kerala State Film Awards, the film won three accolades: Best Popular Film, Best Actress (for Nazriya) and Best Editor (for Paul). At the 62nd Filmfare Awards South, the film received four nominations: Best Actress (for Nazriya), Best Music Director (for Rahman), Best Lyricist (for Harinarayanan) and Best Playback Singer – Male (for Srinivasan). Ohm Shanthi Oshaana is considered as one of the best Malayalam films of the New-Gen cinema movement. The film is remade in Bengali language as Ke Tumi Nandini (2019)

== Plot ==
The film begins in 1983 as Dr. Mathew Devasya anxiously paces the hall outside of a delivery room. He learns that his wife has delivered a baby boy and thanks God for the good news. A stranger comments that Mathew was lucky the baby was not a girl, as he would have had to worry about her all his life. As the stranger says this, a nurse comes out of the delivery room carrying the baby, apologizing that she made a mistake, and confirming that the baby is actually a girl. Mathew glares at the stranger and praises God once again.

The story resumes in 1999 where the baby girl, Pooja, is now a 16 year old tomboy in grade 10. She introduces the audience to her parents. Her father is a doctor by profession and enjoys recording and listening to his own renditions of songs. Her mother, a college lecturer by profession, is a sweet and down-to-earth woman who loves cooking and appreciating her own culinary skills. Pooja also has two friends: Neetu, a flirt, and Donna, a foodie.

Pooja recounts her childhood memories of being a tomboy, riding a motorbike, and of her friendship with Rachel who makes and sells wine as her job. Pooja is her official wine taster. During one of their meetings, she tells Pooja that she can either choose to marry a man she loves or learn to love a stranger that she is forced to marry through arranged marriage. Because of her advice, Pooja decides that she must find someone to love herself.

She settles on Yardley, a popular boy in her school. During a school trip, Yardley approaches Pooja and reveals his crush on her. The next day, she and her friends see a gang of men harassing girls at a waterpark. Pooja gets angry and gets into a fight with them. When one of the gang twists her arm, a man named Giri appears and saves her. Pooja instantly falls for Giri and immediately rejects Yardley, explaining that she cannot accept his proposal as she does not have romantic feelings for him.

Over the course of the rest of the film, Pooja constantly tries to attract the attention of and learn more about Giri, who has now graduated from college and lives as a part-time farmer and Kung Fu sensei. At one point, she learns from her cousin David Kanjyani that his twin, Julie, used to be Giri's girlfriend, but was married off to another man from the US by David and Julie's father, resulting in enmity between Giri and David. She also learns from Rachel that Giri had been considered as a good suitor to her daughter Helen as well. The year is 2000. On Giri's birthday, which also happens to be a Palm Sunday, Pooja decides that she will confess to him with a keychain. When she visits him, it begins to rain and they take shelter in a temple. However, when Pooja tries to declare her love, Giri cuts her off. Telling her that she is just a kid and that she needs to concentrate on her studies because she is destined to become successful, he rejects her. Pooja drops the keychain, and leaves Giri behind into the rain in tears.

Pooja is distraught by Giri's rejection, but focuses on her studies as Giri had requested. She passes her medical entrance exams and goes to Kozhikode Medical College. Pooja tries to contact Giri before leaving, but learns that he was forced to visit China on a Kung Fu Academy trip as he was involved in the love marriage of his friend and the bride's household threatened to kill him. Pooja also has a dream that Giri now has a family with a Chinese woman. At the medical college, she is still friends with Neethu, and another student, Anna. She also befriends a young professor, Dr. Prasad Varkey. During her final year in 2005-06, she runs into Giri again. She confides in Dr. Prasad about Giri and he advises her that enough time has passed and she should pursue him if she is still interested. When Giri's mother is admitted to the hospital, Pooja takes care of her in an effort to get closer to Giri. When Giri's friend Thennal comes to visit, Pooja thinks they are in a relationship and becomes jealous, until she learns that Thennal is already married to Giri's friend.

Pooja comes home to stay with her parents and continues her pursuit of Giri by helping him with his social activities like performing community weddings. Now Giri is 33 and Pooja is 24. During this time, she surprises him by helping to publish a book his mother wrote. Though Pooja thinks Giri has started to care for her, she is heartbroken to learn that Giri is engaged to Sreelakshmi, one of their childhood friends. She learns that David had betrayed Giri in their college days, hence David runs away whenever he sees Giri. One day after Church, David asks Pooja and Giri to help him elope with his love interest Nazeema. After they help him, David gives Giri a letter, telling him only to read it after they've left. When Giri opens the letter, he finds out that David had actually eloped with Sreelakshmi.

Later, Rachel gestures Pooja towards Giri. They go to the same place where Pooja had first proposed to Giri. As she walks up to Giri, he admits that he has loved her all along. He reveals that he kept some memories like the keychain that Pooja originally meant to give him. They get married soon after and Pooja reveals that Dr. Prasad has married Anna, Neetu has married Yardley and that things were going well. Giri has also opened his own KungFu academy. Presently, they (Pooja, Giri and their toddler daughter) are visiting her friend Anna. During their conversation, Prasad enquires about the daughter's name to which Giri replies is "Julie" (named after Giri's ex-girlfriend) much to Pooja's annoyance, which she narrates in the end that "men never forget their first lovers".

== Cast ==
- Nazriya Nazim as Dr. Pooja Mathew
- Nivin Pauly as Giri Madhavan
- Vineeth Srinivasan as Dr. Prasad Varkey, Pooja's best friend and teacher
- Aju Varghese as David Kanjyani, Pooja's cousin
- Renji Panicker as Dr. Mathew Devasya/ Mathayi, Pooja's father
- Anju Kurian as Dr. Anna Maria, Prasad's love interest and Pooja's roommate
- Akshaya Premnath as Neethu, Pooja's friend, a flirt and Yardley's wife
- Manju Satheesh as Annie, Pooja's mother
- Vinaya Prasad as Rachel "Wine Aunty", Pooja's aunt
- Nikki Galrani as Thennal K. Warrier (cameo appearance)
- Vijayaraghavan as Tomichan, Rachel's husband (cameo appearance)
- Lal Jose as Jacob Tharakan, an author
- Sharaf U Dheen as Sunny
- Shobha Mohan as Sumithra Madhavan, Giri's mother
- Harikrishnan as Yardley Avaraan
- Oshein Mertil as Donna, Pooja's foodie friend
- Nimisha Suresh as Sreelakshmi, David's love interest
- Poojitha Menon as Julie Kanjyani, David's twin and Pooja's cousin, also Giri's first love interest
- Parvathi T as Principal Rosamma P.V
- Suja Menon as Sreelakshmi's elder sister
- Nandakishore as Priest
- Tony Alex Valluvassery as Donna's Husband
- Anumod Sakar as Pervert Neji
- Murali as Sakhaav Madhavan, Giri's father (Photo Presence)
- Salim Kumar as Narrator
- Pradeep Kottayam as Jacob
- Midhun Manuel Thomas as Man at Bus stand (Cameo)
- Teenu as the Chinese woman from Pooja's dream

== Reception ==
=== Critical reception ===
Entertainment website "OneIndia" rated the movie as entertaining, stating that the film has its share of happiness, one-liners and decent performances from the leading pair. The New Indian Express calls Om Shanthi Oshaana a "‘Peaceful’ Attempt at film making." "Sify" stated that the director Jude Anthany Joseph "creates an engaging enough drama in Ohm Shanthi Oshaana, that you're happy to emotionally invest in [it]."

=== Box office ===
The film completed 100 days in 12 screens. It grossed over ₹2.7 crore (US$280,000) in 4 days at the Indian box office. The film collected ₹6.1 crore in its three weeks in Kerala box office. The film completed 50 days n 25 screens. Overall, the film grossed ₹10.3 crore (US$1.1 million) at the box office. It was one of the biggest commercial successes of 2014 in Malayalam.

== Soundtrack ==
Ohm Shanthi Oshaana

Film score by Shaan Rahman
- Released: 27 January 2014
- Genre: Film soundtrack
- Label: Think Music India
- Producer: Shaan Rahman

Shaan Rahman chronology
Thira (2013)	Ohm Shanthi Oshaana (2014)	Praise the Lord (2014)

Ohm Shanti Oshaana's music was composed by Shaan Rahman with lyrics by Manu Manjith.

Original track listing
No.	Title	Singer(s)	Length
1.	"Kattu Mooliyo"	Vineeth Sreenivasan	03:49
2.	"Mounam Chorum Neram"	Rinu Razak, Hesham	03:11
3.	"Sneham Cherum Neram"	Rinu Razak, Hesham	03:11
4.	"Mandaarame"	Job Kurian, Shaan Rahman	03:24
5.	"Ee Mazha Megham"	Remya Nambeesan	02:36
6.	"Neelakasham"	Shaan Rahman	02:29
Total length:			25:58

== Accolades ==
45th Kerala State Film Awards

- Best Film with Popular Appeal and Aesthetic Value
- Best Actress – Nazriya Nazim
- Best Editor – Lijo Paul

Film Critics Award

- 2014: Atlas Film Critics Award for Best Debutant Director
- 2014: Mohan Raghavan Memorial Award for Best Script
- 2014: Asiavision Award for Best Family Movie
