= Anna Katharina Valayil =

Indian musician (born 1984)

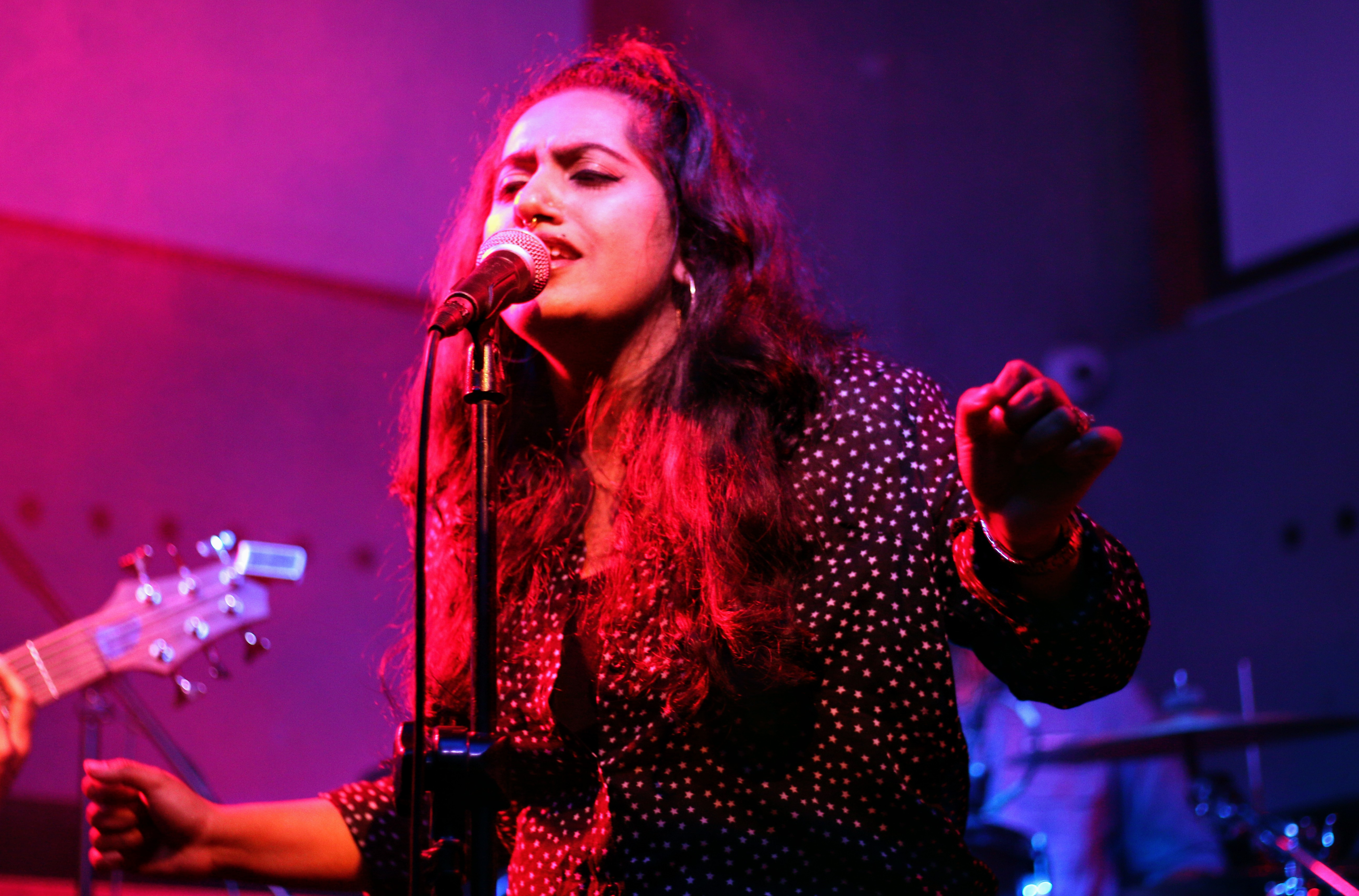

Background information
- Born: Ann Varghese; 13 June 1984 (age 42); Kottayam, India
- Genres: Electro pop • Afro funk • Jazz • Reggae
- Occupation: Singer • Songwriter • Composer • Pilot
- Years active: 2010–present

Anna Katharina Valayil is an Indian musician who performs in Malayalam and Tamil. Her single "Appangal Embadum" appeared in the movie Ustad Hotel.

== Life ==
Valayil was born in India and later moved to Nigeria. She has a Bachelor's Degree from St. Theresa's College, Cochin, a Master's in Media Studies from Swinburne University, and has attended flying school. She spent three years in South Australia studying indigenous music. Her debut music video was Honey Bee.

She has collaborated with Gopi Sundar, Santhosh Chandran and Marthyan. In 2012 she won the award for Best Singer Female at the Kochi Times Film Awards. The following year she won Best Debut Artist at the GMMA Awards, the Favorite New Voice award at Mollywood Nakshatra, and was nominated for Best Debutante Singer at the SIIMA Awards.

== Discography ==
=== Singer ===
Year	Film	Songs	Language	Notes
2012	Casanovva	Theme music	Malayalam	
2012	Ee Adutha Kaalathu	"Naatil Veetil"	Malayalam	
2012	Masters		Malayalam	
2012	Mallu Singh		Malayalam	
2012	Hero		Malayalam	
2012	Ustad Hotel	"Appangal Embadum", "Mel Mel Mel"	Malayalam	
2012	Yaaruda Mahesh	"Oodum Unakkidhu", "Vayadhai Keduthu", "Yaaruda Andha Mahesh"	Tamil	
2013	Left Right Left	"Che Guevara"	Malayalam	
2013	ABCD: American-Born Confused Desi	"Johnny Mone Johnny", "Vaanam", "Nayapaisayilla" (Remix)	Malayalam	
2013	Camel Safari	"Halwa"	Malayalam	
2014	Bangalore Days	"Baby I Need You"	English	
2015	Lailaa O Lailaa	"Dil Dilvana"	Malayalam	
2016	Bangalore Naatkal	"I Want to Fly"	English	

=== Songwriter ===
Year	Film	Songs
2013	ABCD: American-Born Confused Desi	"Johnny Mone Johnny"
2014	Bangalore Days	"Ente Kannil Ninnakaayi", "I Want to Fly"
2015	Lailaa O Lailaa	"Lailaa O Lailaa"

=== Composer ===
- Aakashvani (2016)
