= Filmfare Award for Best Supporting Actor – Malayalam =

Indian annual film award

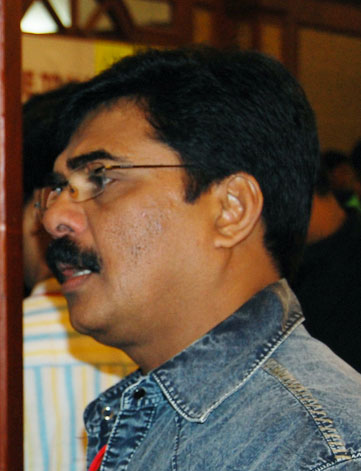
- The 2024 recipient: Vijayaraghavan
- Awarded for: Best Performance by an Actor in a Supporting Role - Malayalam
- Country: India
- Presented by: Filmfare
- First award: Innocent for Manassinakkare (2003)
- Currently held by: Vijayaraghavan for Kishkindha Kaandam (2024)
- Website: http://filmfareawards.indiatimes.com/

The Filmfare Award for Best Supporting Actor – Malayalam is given by the Filmfare magazine as part of its annual Filmfare Awards South for Malayalam films.

== Winners ==
This is the complete list of the award winners and the roles and films they won for.

| Year | Actor | Role | Film | Ref |
|---|---|---|---|---|
| 2024 | Vijayaraghavan | K. Appu Pillai | Kishkindha Kaandam |
| 2023 | Jagadish | Dileep | Purusha Pretham |
| 2022 | Indrans | Kuttichayan | Udal |
| 2020–2021 | Joju George | ASI Maniyan | Nayattu |
| 2019 | AWARDS FUNCTION WAS SUSPENDED DUE TO COVID-19 PANDEMIC |
| 2018 | Vinayakan | Ayyappan | Ee.Ma.Yau. |
| 2017 | Alencier Ley Lopez | A.S.I .Chandran | Thondimuthalum Driksakshiyum |
| 2016 | Vinayakan | Gangadharan | Kammatipaadam |
| 2015 | Tovino Thomas | Perumparambil Appu | Ennu Ninte Moideen |
| 2014 | Jayasurya | Subin Joseph | Apothecary |
| 2013 | Murali Gopy | Roy Joseph / Che Guevara Roy | Left Right Left |
| 2012 | Biju Menon | Suku | Ordinary |
| 2011 | Thilakan | Achutha Menon | Indian Rupee |
| 2010 | Biju Menon | Jose / Vishnu | Marikkundoru Kunjadu |
| 2009 | Manoj K Jayan | Thalakkal Chandu | Pazhassiraja |
| 2008 | Anoop Menon | Ajay Chandran | Thirakkatha |
| 2007 | Sai Kumar | Vasudeva Panicker | Ananda Bhairavi |
| 2006 | Jagathy Sreekumar | Unnithan Asan | Vasthavam |
| 2003 | Innocent | Chacko Mappilla | Manassinakkare |
