= Vennala =

- Ward
- Location in Kerala, India
- Coordinates: 9.996°N 76.326°E
- Country: India
- State: Kerala
- District: Ernakulam

Languages
  - Official: Malayalam, English
- Time zone: UTC+5:30 (IST)
- PIN: 682028
- Telephone code: 0484-280
- Vehicle registration: KL-07
- Lok Sabha constituency: Ernakulam
- Climate: 20 Dc - 34 Dc (Köppen)

Vennala is a ward of Kochi, Kerala. It was one of the early panchayats of Kerala, that was amalgamated with other panchayats during the formation of Kochi corporation. Located at around 6 km from the city center, it spans the area from Alinchuvadu to Arkakkadavu and from Kottenkavu to Padivattom.

The famous Vennala Mahadeva temple and Kottangavu Bhagavathi, Mangala temple are located here. Vennala Sneham Mathrubhumi study circle, Century club, Vennala Abhayamatha Church, Vennala St. Mathews Church and Vennala Govt. HSS, Absolute academy are in this circle. The mosque called "Vadakaneith Pally" is also located here.

Vennala hosted the India's first professional Club "F C COCHIN"

Ernakulam Medical Centre (EMC) is a multi-speciality hospital located in this suburb.

Its proximity to Vyttila bus terminal has been attracting many builders to develop residential neighborhoods across this region.
