= Nazriya Nazim =

Indian actress and producer (born 1993)

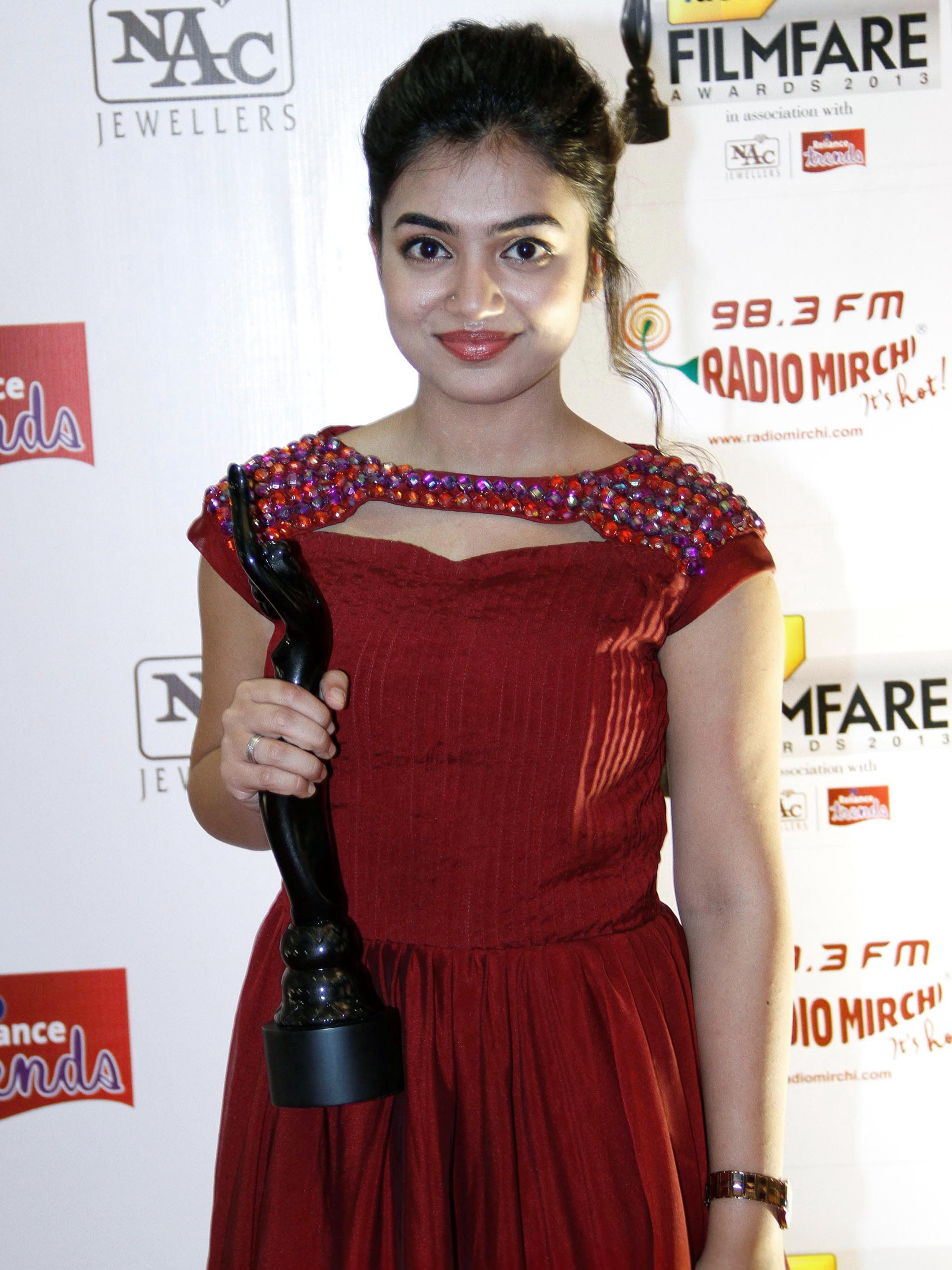
- Nazriya in 2014
- Born: 20 December 1994 (age 31); Thiruvananthapuram, Kerala, India
- Occupations: Actress; host; producer; singer
- Years active: 2006–present
- Spouse: Fahadh Faasil (m. 2014)
- Family: Fazil family (by marriage)
- Awards: Full list

Nazriya Nazim Fahadh (born 20 December 1994) is an Indian actress, producer and singer who primarily works in Malayalam and Tamil films. Nazriya is a recipient of several accolades including two Kerala State Film Awards, one Tamil Nadu State Film Award and one Filmfare Award South.

Nazriya started her career as a presenter in 2005. After working as a child artist, she had her lead screen debut in the 2013 Malayalam film Maad Dad. She then went on to appear in successful Tamil films such as Neram (2013), Raja Rani (2013) and Vaayai Moodi Pesavum (2014). She established herself as a leading Malayalam actress with her portrayals in Ohm Shanthi Oshaana (2014) and Bangalore Days (2014). Both these films earned her the Kerala State Film Award for Best Actress.

Following her marriage to actor Fahadh Faasil, she took a break from acting. She made her return to films with the box office success Koode (2018). Nazriya then earned praises for Ante Sundaraniki (2022) and Sookshmadarshini (2024), the latter emerging a commercial success. Her highest grossing release came with Scene (2026).

In addition to acting, Nazriya also produces films under the banner Fahadh Faasil and Friends, which she co-owns with her husband. Her production Kumbalangi Nights (2019), won her the Best Film with Popular Appeal and Aesthetic Value at the Kerala State Film Awards.

== Early life and education ==
Nazriya was born on 20 December 1994, in a Malayali Muslim family to Nazimuddeen and Beegum Beena. She has a brother, Naveen Nazim, who is an actor. Nazriya's family lived in Al Ain, UAE, before moving to Thiruvananthapuram, where she was born.

Nazriya completed her schooling from Our Own English High School, Al Ain, and Christ Nagar School, Thiruvananthapuram. She later joined Mar Ivanios College, Trivandrum for a degree in Bachelor of Commerce, but reportedly left the college, owing to her tight shooting schedules.

== Career ==
=== Early work as host and child artist (2005–2012) ===
Nazriya started her career as an anchor in a Muslim-oriented television quiz show named Punyamaasathiloode in 2005 on Kairali TV, following up with various other anchoring roles in singing, quiz and reality shows. She also hosted Asianet's popular music reality show Star Singer.

Nazriya started her acting career in 2006 as a child artist in the Malayalam film Palunku, directed by Blessy, playing Geethu, daughter of Mammootty's character. A critic of Deccan Herald felt she gave a "stellar performance" alongside the lead cast. She later reunited with Mammootty in the 2010 film Pramani. The Mohanlal-starrer Oru Naal Varum was her next venture that year, in which she played Dhanya, the daughter of Sreenivasan's character. In 2012, she was cast in an album titled Yuvvh by Sony Music Entertainment, alongside Nivin Pauly which became very popular among the youth.

=== Established actress and career hiatus (2013–2017) ===
Nazriya made her lead screen debut in the 2013 Malayalam film Maad Dad, playing Mariya alongside Lal and Lalu Alex. A Times of India critic said, "Nazriya appears burdened by a badly conceived role that appears too heavy for her." Nazriya next appeared as Jeena / Veni in the Malayalam-Tamil bilingual Neram, marking her Tamil debut, and reuniting with Nivin Pauly after Yuvvh. A major commercial success, the scene where Nivin proposes to Nazriya's character acquired cult status among the audience. Paresh C Palicha stated that she has a "striking screen presence". The film earned her the Filmfare Award for Best Female Debut – South and Tamil Nadu State Film Award Special Prize.

Later in 2013, Nazriya played an IT professional Keerthana, in the Tamil film Raja Rani, opposite Arya. Gautaman Bhaskaran from Hindustan Times noted, "The one person who caught my attention was Nazriya Nazim, who as Arya's lover, is absolutely gorgeous with a face that is so expressive that we do not need her to speak". It was another box-office success and earned her nomination for Filmfare Award for Best Supporting Actress – Tamil. Her final release that year was the Tamil film Naiyaandi, in which she played a dentist Vanaroja, opposite Dhanush. The film received negative reviews and was her only failure that year. S Saraswathi noted, "Nazriya looks extremely pretty and does full justice to her bubbly energetic character."

Nazriya had five releases in 2014, her most successful year. She first played Shahana in the Malayalam film Salalah Mobiles, opposite Dulquer Salmaan, a box office failure. Mythily Ramachandran felt Nazriya doesn't have much to offer beside "looking beautiful". In her next Malayalam film Ohm Shanthi Oshaana, opposite Nivin Pauly, Nazriya played a medical student Pooja. The film became a blockbuster and one of the highest-grossing film of the year. Her performance was praised by critics with The New Indian Express stating, "The performance by Nazriya is the highlight of the movie. Her acting leaves some bright spots but she lacks some efforts in the emotional scenes." She then appeared in the Malayalam-Tamil bilingual, Vaayai Moodi Pesavum, opposite Dulquer Salmaan, playing a doctor Anjana. Subha J. Rao of The Hindu appreciated Nazriya and added that her "eyes speak volumes". It became a box office success.

Following these film, Nazriya played Divya, an MBA aspirant forced in an arrange marriage, opposite Fahadh Faasil in the Malayalam film Bangalore Days, her career's most notable film. The film became a box-office success and one of the highest grossing Malayalam films of all time, following which it gained a cult status. Aswin J Kumar of The Times of India opined that Nazriya assures she is "one for the future", while Sify termed her act to be "full of life". Her final release that year was the Tamil film, Thirumanam Enum Nikkah, opposite Jai, where she played an Vishnu Priya, who assume fake identity of a Muslim girl. Anupama Subramanian of Deccan Chronicle found her to be "adorable". Both Ohm Shanthi Oshaana and Bangalore Days won her the Kerala State Film Award for Best Actress, while the former earned her Filmfare Award for Best Actress – Malayalam nomination. This success was followed by her marriage to Fahadh Faasil, after which she took a break from acting.

=== Success, production and further expansion (2018–2023) ===
Nazriya made her comeback to films after a four-year break, with the 2018 Malayalam film Koode, alongside Prithviraj. She played Jenny, Prithviraj's sister and a congenital disease patient. The film was a commercial success and earned her another Filmfare Best Actress – Malayalam nomination. Anna M. M. Vetticad opined: "The writing and Nazriya's acting often cutesify Jenny. Though this sort of hyper-bubbly girl is too familiar a sight in commercial Indian cinema, Nazriya's charm is hard to resist." That year, she also ventured into production with Varathan, a commercial success.

Nazriya then co-produced the 2019 film Kumbalangi Nights, with her husband. The film emerged a major commercial success and earned cult status. In 2020, Nazriya reunited with Fahadh Faasil, in Trance, playing a model and sex worker Esther. The film became a box-office failure due to COVID-19, but Cris from The News Minute found her character to be "charming" and added that she has matured as an actor. That year, she also played a cameo in Maniyarayile Ashokan, as Jacob Gregory's wife. Haricharan Pudipeddi was appreciative of her appearance in the film. In the same year, she co-produced C U Soon, where she also worked as a production designer.

Nazriya expanded to Telugu films in 2022. She played a professional photographer Leela, opposite Nani in Ante Sundaraniki. The film was a major commercial success overseas and did modest business in India. Janani K from India Today noted, "Nazriya has once again impressed everyone with her ultimate cuteness. You could see Leela in her and she has done total justice to her character." Her performance earned her the Filmfare Award for Best Actress – Telugu nomination.

=== Career progression (2024–present) ===
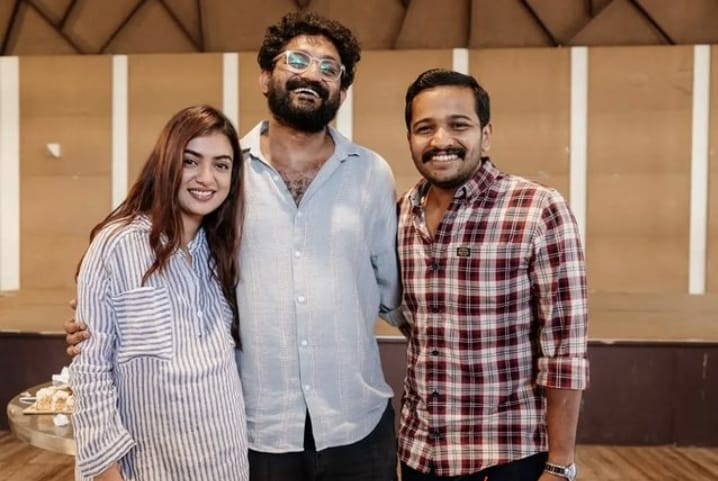
Nazriya at Sookshmadarshini's launch with director M. C. Jithin and actor Basil Joseph

With no release in 2023, Nazriya started 2024 with her co-production Aavesham, which emerged as the tenth highest grossing Malayalam film of all time. In the same year, Nazriya marked her comeback to Malayalam films after four years, with Sookshmadarshini. She played Priyadarshini, a homemaker unravelling her neighbour's secret alongside Basil Joseph. Anandu Suresh found her to be "inconsistent" initially, adding that she eventually delivers a "more compelling performance". The film emerged a major box office success. It earned her the Kerala Film Critics Association Award for Best Actress and third Filmfare Best Actress – Malayalam nomination.

2026 saw Nazriya return to Tamil films after 12 years with Scene. She portrayed Maya, a trauma survivor who assist a police officer in a serial killer case, opposite Suriya. Yashaswini Sri of The Indian Express noted, "Nazriya’s Maya is the emotional centre of the film, and she carries her character with quite grace and intensity." The film became a commercial success, emerged as her highest grossing release and one of the highest grossing Tamil films of all time.

She will next appear in the Malayalam film Gracias El Clásico, opposite Tovino Thomas, and will make her streaming debut with the Tamil series The Madras Mystery – Fall of a Superstar.

== Personal life ==
Nazriya met actor Fahadh Faasil on the sets of their film Bangalore Days, in 2013 and they eventually began dating. Following a year courtship, the couple got engaged on 20 January 2014. Nazriya married Fahadh on 21 August 2014, in Thiruvananthapuram.

== Off-screen work ==
In addition to acting, Nazriya supports various causes and charitable organisations. In 2014, she supported Kerala Government's online campaign against drugs. In 2024, she and her husband, Fahadh contributed ₹25 lakhs for the relief work of Wayanad landslides.

Nazriya is a celebrity endorser for several brands such as Camerry and Merricrem Icecreams. She has been cover model for several magazines including Vanitha.

== Artistry and public image ==
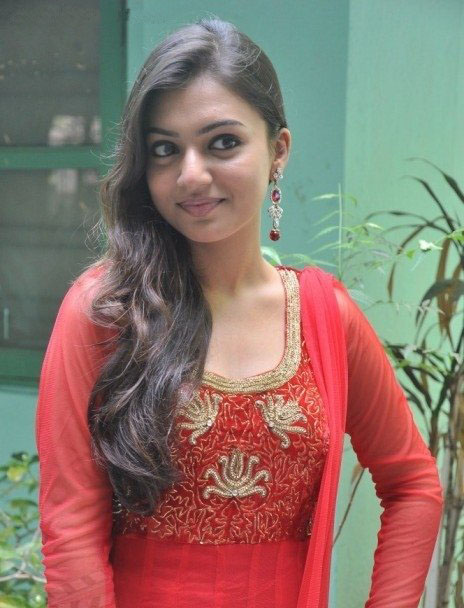
Nazriya in 2013

Nazriya has established herself as one of the highest paid Malayalam actresses. Shilpa Nair Anand of The Hindu termed her as "Kerala's sweetheart". Nikhil Skaria Korah of Onmanorama noted, "Nazriya Nazim's cute expressions and the roles of chirpy and happy young women in many movies had earned her the "girl-next-door" status."

Her characters from Ohm Shanthi Oshaana and Bangalore Days, are considered among the strongest female roles in Malayalam films. On Ohm Shanthi Oshaana, ScoopWhoop noted, "Nazriya's Pooja is quite new and refreshing in Malayalam cinema". The film was narrated from a woman's perspective, which The Hindu found to be a "rarity" in Malayalam films. Parvati Mohan of Film Companion, spoke about Divya from Bangalore Days: "Kunju's is a very realistic empowerment. Despite operating within the bounds of patriarchy, she gets what she wants out of it, in the best way that she can." For these performance, Ranjana K of Mathrubhumi opined that there is no actress in Malayalam cinema to replace Nazriya.

In the Kochi Times Most Desirable Women list, Nazriya was placed 5th in 2013 and 3rd in 2017, 2018 and 2020. Nazriya was named the Women of the Year by Man's World, in 2020. In 2026, The Hollywood Reporter India featured her in their Women in Entertainment Power List. With over 8.4 million followers, Nazriya is the most followed Malayalam actress on Instagram. She is also noted for her fashion style.

== Filmography ==
Key
†	Denotes film or TV productions that have not yet been released

=== Films ===
Year	Title	Role	Language(s)	Notes	Ref.
2006	Palunku	Geethu	Malayalam	Child artist	
2010	Pramani	Sindhu	Malayalam	Child artist	
2010	Oru Naal Varum	Dhanya Gopi Krishnan	Malayalam	Child artist	
2013	Maad Dad	Mariya	Malayalam		
2013	Neram	Jeena	Malayalam	Bilingual film	
2013	Neram	Veni	Tamil	Bilingual film	
2013	Raja Rani	Keerthana	Tamil		
2013	Naiyaandi	Dr. Vanaroja	Tamil		
2014	Salalah Mobiles	Shahana	Malayalam		
2014	Ohm Shanthi Oshaana	Dr. Pooja Mathew	Malayalam		
2014	Vaayai Moodi Pesavum	Dr. Anjana	Tamil	Bilingual film	
2014	Samsaaram Aarogyathinu Haanikaram	Dr. Anjana	Malayalam	Bilingual film	
2014	Bangalore Days	Divya "Kunju" Prakash	Malayalam		
2014	Thirumanam Enum Nikkah	Vishnu Priya Iyengar / Ayesha	Tamil		
2018	Koode	Jennifer "Jenny" Maria Thomas	Malayalam		
2020	Trance	Esther Lopez	Malayalam		
2020	Maniyarayile Ashokan	Indu Ashokan	Malayalam	Cameo appearance	
2022	Ante Sundaraniki	Leela Thomas	Telugu		
2024	Sookshmadarshini	Priyadarshini "Priya" Antony	Malayalam		
2026	Scene	Maya	Tamil		
2027	Gracias El Clásico †	TBA	Malayalam	Completed	

=== Television ===
Year	Title	Role	Notes	Ref.
2005	Shruthilayam	Host		
2006	Chandrakantham -Telequiss	Host		
2010	Thanthonniyum Tharangalum	Host		
2010–2012	Star Singer Junior	Host		
2012	Star Singer	Host		
2012–2013	Asianet Film Awards	Host	Along with Ranjini Haridas	
TBA	The Madras Mystery – Fall of a Superstar		Filming; Tamil web series on SonyLIV	

=== Producer ===
Year	Title	Language	Notes	Ref.
2018	Varathan	Malayalam		
2019	Kumbalangi Nights	Malayalam		
2020	C U Soon	Malayalam	Also production designer	
2024	Aavesham	Malayalam		
2026	Bachelor Party D'eux †	Malayalam		

=== Music video ===
Year	Title	Singer(s)	Album	Ref.
2012	"Nenjodu Cherthu"	Aalap Raju, Devan	Yuvvh	

== Discography ==
Year	Song	Film	Composer	Ref.
2014	"La La Lasa (Ummachi Rap)"	Salalah Mobiles	Gopi Sunder	
2014	"Ente Kannil Ninakkai"	Bangalore Days	Gopi Sunder	
2018	"Nee"	Varathan	Sushin Shyam	
2018	"Puthiyoru Pathayil"	Varathan	Sushin Shyam	
2024	"Odimaga"	Aavesham	Sushin Shyam	

== Accolades ==
Nazriya won the Filmfare Award for Best Female Debut – South and Tamil Nadu State Film Award Special Prize, both for Neram. She then earned two Kerala State Film Awards — Best Actress for Ohm Shanthi Oshaana and Bangalore Days, and Best Film with Popular Appeal and Aesthetic Value for Kumbalangi Nights.
