= Filmfare Award for Best Male Playback Singer – Malayalam =

Award by Filmfare magazine

The Filmfare Award for Best Male Playback Singer – Malayalam is given by the Filmfare magazine as part of its annual Filmfare Awards South for Malayalam films.

== Superlatives ==
Superlative	Male Playback Singer	Record
Most wins	Vijay Yesudas	5
Second most wins	K. J. Yesudas	3

== Winners ==
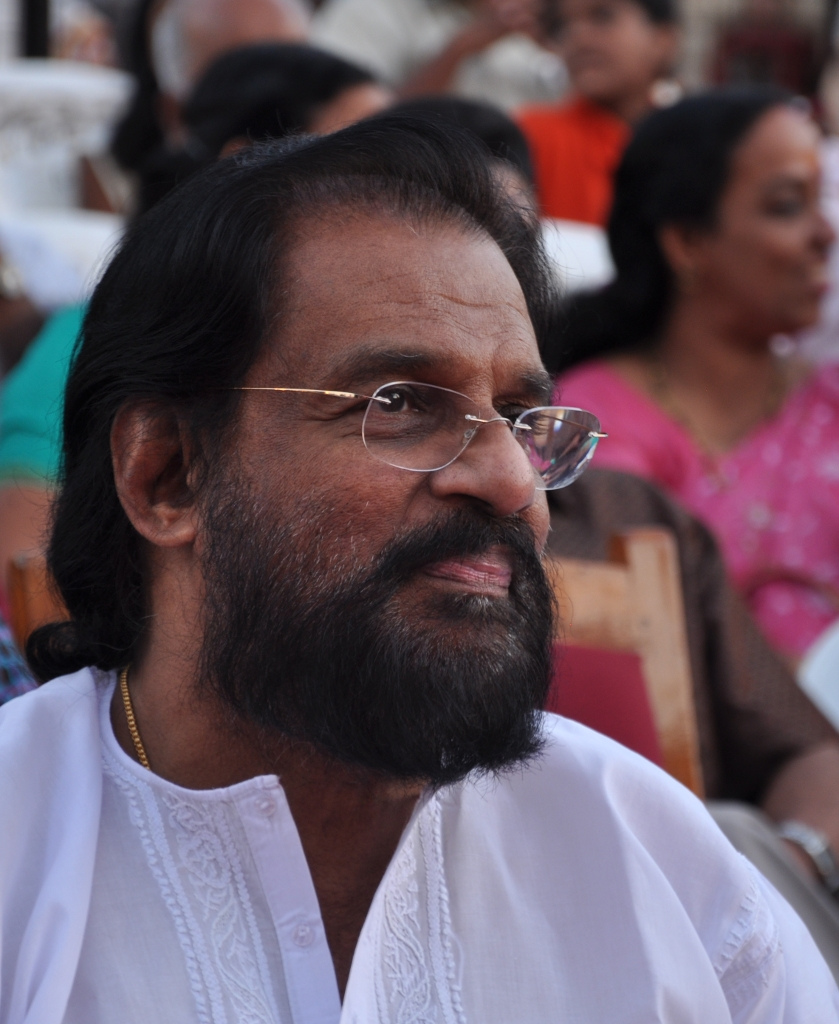
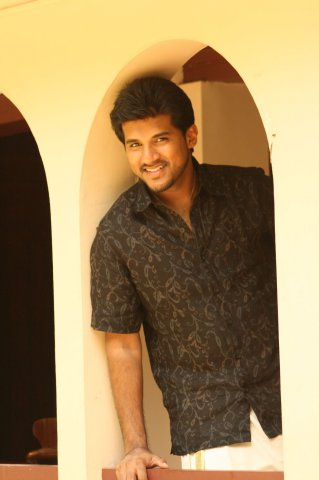
K. J. Yesudas (l) won this honour thrice and his son Vijay Yesudas (r) has won it a record five times.

Year	Male Playback Singer	Film	Ref
2024	Jithin Raj	Aadujeevitham ("Periyone")
2023	Kapil Kapilan	RDX ("Neela Nilave")
2022	Unni Menon	Bheeshma Parvam ("Rathipushpam")
2020–2021	Shahabaz Aman	Vellam ("Akashamayavale")
2019	AWARDS FUNCTION WAS SUSPENDED DUE TO COVID-19 PANDEMIC
2018	Vijay Yesudas	Joseph ("Poomuthole")
2017	Shahabaz Aman	Mayaanadhi ("Mizhiyil Ninnu Mizhiyilekku")
2016	M. G. Sreekumar	Oppam ("Chinnamma")
2015	Vijay Yesudas	Premam ("Malare")
2014	Haricharan	Bangalore Days ("Ethu Kari Ravilum")
2013	Vijay Yesudas	Memories ("Thirayum Theeravum")
2012	Vijay Yesudas	Spirit ("Mazhakondu Mathram")
2011	Vijay Yesudas	Indian Rupee ("Ee Puzhayum")
2010	Hariharan	Kadha Thudarunnu
2009	K. J. Yesudas	Kerala Varma Pazhassi Raja
2008	K. J. Yesudas	Madampi
2007	Madhu Balakrishnan	Rock n' Roll
2006	K. J. Yesudas	Vadakkumnadhan
