= Vikram filmography =

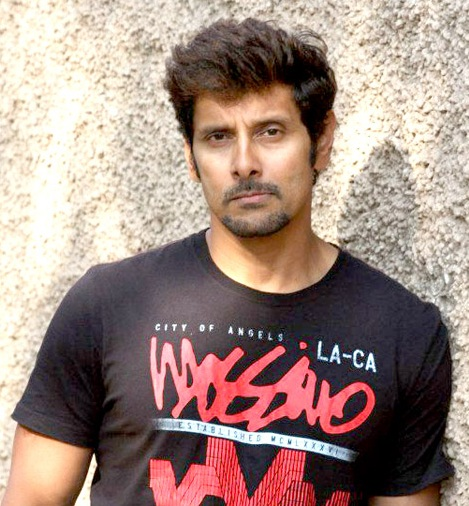
- Vikram in Mumbai
- Film: 60
- Television series: 2
- Television show: 12
- Music videos: 4
- Advertising: 7

Vikram is an Indian actor, playback singer and former dubbing artist known for his work in Tamil cinema. Besides Tamil, he has also worked in Malayalam, Telugu and Hindi language films. He has featured in over 60 motion pictures, three television programs, and several music videos and commercials.

An aspiring actor since childhood, Vikram modelled for television commercials and appeared in a short film, hoping to get noticed by casting directors. He made his television debut with the Doordarshan series Galatta Kudumbam (1988), following which his first feature film role came with the experimental film En Kadhal Kanmani (1990). His early career in Tamil cinema saw consecutive box-office failures, after which he attempted a transition to Telugu and Malayalam cinema. Vikram mostly played the lead roles in Telugu films, many of which were financial failures. In Malayalam films, he usually appeared in ensemble films, playing "second fiddle" to established actors like Mammootty and Suresh Gopi, which failed to help his career. Meanwhile, the few sporadic appearances he made in Tamil cinema also proved unsuccessful.

Vikram landed his breakthrough role of a college student who suffers a brain injury in filmmaker Bala's directorial debut, the film Sethu (1999). It was a sleeper hit and earned Vikram a Special Jury award at the Filmfare and Tamil Nadu State Film Award ceremonies. In 2001, he played an aspiring policeman in the action film Dhill, the directorial debut of Dharani. In 2002, Vikram was awarded his first Filmfare Award for Best Actor for portraying a blind village singer in the Vinayan-directed tragedy Kasi (2001), a remake of the director's Malayalam film Vasanthiyum Lakshmiyum Pinne Njaanum (1999). Vikram went on to play the quintessential Tamil action hero in a series of commercial successful masala films beginning with Gemini (2002) which grossed ₹210 million at the box office. Gemini film was the highest grossing Tamil film of the year 2002. The next year, with consecutive commercial success in Dhool (2003) and Saamy (2003), he attained stardom. He then played an undertaker with autism in Bala's tragedy drama Pithamagan (2003) co-starring Suriya. His portrayal attracted positive reviews and garnered him his third Filmfare award, and Best Actor trophies at the Tamil Nadu State Film Award and National Film Award ceremonies.

Vikram underwent a professional setback between 2004 and 2008 when a series of films—Arul (2004), Majaa (2005) and Bheemaa (2008)—received mixed reviews and were commercial failures. Vikram's sole box-office success during this period was S. Shankar's psychological thriller Anniyan (2005), in which he played a utopian lawyer suffering from multiple personality disorder. The film was the second highest grossing Tamil film of the year 2005 by collecting ₹57 crore from the box office. The film was commercial success in all the South Indian states- Tamil Nadu, Kerala (where the film was the highest grossing Tamil film in Kerala at that time which ran over 150 days in theatres), Andhra Pradesh (where the dubbed version Aparichitudu was the highest-grossing film of 2005) and Karnataka. The film also earned him critical acclaim and his fourth Filmfare award. Meanwhile, Vikram ventured into film production by joining a production company, Reel Life Entertainment, as one of its directors. In Susi Ganesan's Kanthaswamy (2009), he played a CBI officer who moonlights as a superhero. In 2010, Vikram was introduced in Bollywood by Mani Ratnam through his Hindi-Tamil bilingual Raavan and Raavanan, a contemporary retelling of the Ramayana, in which Vikram played the antagonist and protagonist in the respective versions. Vikram earned mixed reviews for his characterisation in the former; but his performance in the latter earned him rave reviews and his fifth Filmfare award. In 2011, Vikram played a man with developmental disability fighting over his daughter's custody in A. L. Vijay's courtroom drama Deiva Thirumagal, an adaptation of the American film I Am Sam (2001). Vikram's performance was praised and won him the Critics Award for Best Actor at Filmfare. However, his next role of an aspiring screen villain in Rajapattai (2011) was poorly received.

In 2012, Vikram appeared in A. L. Vijay's revenge-thriller Thaandavam, playing a blind RAW agent who uses human echolocation to track down his betrayer. In Bejoy Nambiar's three-story-arc Hindi-language anthology film David (2013), he played one of the three eponymous lead characters, an alcoholic fisherman in love with his friend's fiancée. Shankar's romantic-thriller I (2015) featured Vikram as a supermodel-turned-hunchback who exacts revenge on his conspirators. The film grossed over ₹ 2.4 billion at the box office and Vikram's performance was critically acclaimed. Then he acted in 10 Endrathukulla (2015), Iru Mugan (2016), Sketch (2018), Saamy Square (2018), Kadaram Kondan (2019) and Mahaan (2022).

== Film ==
Key
| † | Denotes films that have not yet been released |

=== As an actor ===
- All films are Tamil unless otherwise noted.

Vikram film acting credits
| Year | Title | Role(s) | Notes | Ref. |
|---|---|---|---|---|
| 1990 | En Kadhal Kanmani | Vinod | | |
| 1991 | Thanthu Vitten Ennai | Raju | | |
| 1992 | Kaaval Geetham | Ashok | | |
| 1992 | Meera | Jeeva | | |
| 1993 | Dhruvam | Bhadran | Malayalam film | |
| 1993 | Akka Pettanam Chelleli Kapuram | Radha Krishna | Telugu film | |
| 1993 | Chirunavvula Varamistava | Vicky | Telugu film | |
| 1993 | Mafia | Harishankar | Malayalam film | |
| 1994 | Bangaru Kutumbam | Suryam | Telugu film | |
| 1994 | Sainyam | Jiji | Malayalam film | |
| 1994 | Pudhiya Mannargal | Sathyamoorthy | | |
| 1995 | Street | Sajeev | Malayalam film | |
| 1995 | Aadaalla Majaka | Vikram | Telugu film | |
| 1996 | Ooha | Mohan | Telugu film | |
| 1996 | Mayooranritham | Rajeev | Malayalam film | |
| 1996 | Akka! Bagunnava? | Pedababu | Telugu film | |
| 1996 | Indraprastham | Peter | Malayalam film | |
| 1996 | Rajaputhran | Manu | Malayalam film | |
| 1996 | Merupu | Guru | Telugu film | |
| 1997 | Itha Oru Snehagatha | Roy | Malayalam film | |
| 1997 | Ullaasam | Dev | | |
| 1998 | Kangalin Vaarthaigal | Chandru | | |
| 1999 | House Full | Hameed | | |
| 1999 | Sethu | Sethu (Chiyaan) | Filmfare Special Jury Award | |
| 1999 | Red Indians | Rahul | Malayalam film | |
| 2000 | Indriyam | Udhaya | Malayalam film | |
| 2000 | 9 Nelalu | Surendra | Telugu film | |
| 2001 | Vinnukum Mannukum | Selvam | | |
| 2001 | Dhill | Kanagavel | | |
| 2001 | Kasi | Kasi | Filmfare Award for Best Actor – Tamil | |
| 2002 | Gemini | Gemini | | |
| 2002 | Samurai | Thyagu | | |
| 2002 | King | Raja | | |
| 2003 | Dhool | Aarumugam | | |
| 2003 | Kadhal Sadugudu | Suresh | | |
| 2003 | Saamy | Aarusaamy Chockalingam | Nominated – Filmfare Award for Best Actor | |
| 2003 | Pithamagan | Chithan | National Film Award for Best Actor; Filmfare Award for Best Actor – Tamil | |
| 2004 | Arul | Arulkumaran | | |
| 2005 | Youth | Babu | Telugu film; delayed release | |
| 2005 | Anniyan | Ramanujam "Ambi" Iyengar (Remo/Anniyan) (Note: Vikram played a single character with dissociative identity disorder, taking on two further personalities.) | Filmfare Award for Best Actor – Tamil | |
| 2005 | Majaa | Arivumathi | Also assistant director | |
| 2008 | Bheemaa | Sekar | | |
| 2009 | Kanthaswamy | V. Pugazhmarattu Kanthaswamy | | |
| 2010 | Raavan | Dev Pratap Sharma | Hindi film | |
| 2010 | Raavanan | Veeraiya | Filmfare Award for Best Actor – Tamil | |
| 2011 | Deiva Thirumagal | Krishna | Won—Filmfare Critics Award for Best Actor – Tamil; Nominated—Filmfare Award for Best Actor – Tamil | |
| 2011 | Rajapattai | "Annal" Murugan | | |
| 2012 | Thaandavam | Shivakumar (Kenny Thomas) (Note: Vikram played a single character with two names.) | Nominated – Filmfare Award for Best Actor – Tamil | |
| 2013 | David | David (Sakku Santa) | Hindi film (Note: The film was partially reshot in Tamil with Jiiva; however, all of his scenes were dubbed from the Hindi version except for part of the climax scene.) | |
| 2013 | David | David (Kirku Santa) | Partially reshot version in Tamil | |
| 2015 | I | Lingesan (Lee) | 50th film & Filmfare Award for Best Actor – Tamil | |
| 2015 | 10 Endrathukulla | James Bond | | |
| 2016 | Iru Mugan | Akhilan Vinod and Dr. Love (Note: Vikram played two characters.) | Nominated – Filmfare Award for Best Actor – Tamil | |
| 2018 | Sketch | Jeeva (Sketch) | | |
| 2018 | Saamy Square | Aarusaamy Chockalingam and Ramasaamy Aarusaamy | | |
| 2019 | Kadaram Kondan | KK | | |
| 2019 | Adithya Varma | Visitor in Dehradun | Uncredited cameo | |
| 2022 | Mahaan | Gandhi Mahaan | | |
| 2022 | Cobra | Madhiazhagan (Madhi) and Kathirvelan (Kathir/Cobra) | | |
| 2022 | Ponniyin Selvan: I | Aditha Karikalan | Nominated – Filmfare Award for Best Actor – Tamil | |
| 2023 | Ponniyin Selvan: II | Aditha Karikalan | Filmfare Award for Best Actor – Tamil | |
| 2024 | Thangalaan | Thangalaan Muni, Kaadaiyan, Arasan (Aaran), Adhi Muni, Naga Muni (Note: Vikram played five characters.) | | |
| 2025 | Veera Dheera Sooran | Kaali | | |
| 2027 | Power House † | TBA | Filming | |
| TBA | Dhruva Natchathiram † | John / Dhruv | Awaiting release | |
| TBA | Chiyaan 64 † | TBA | Announced | |

=== As a dubbing artist ===
Vikram film dubbing credits
| Year | Title | Voiced for | Notes | Ref. |
|---|---|---|---|---|
| 1993 | Jaathi Malli | Vineeth | | |
| 1993 | Amaravathi | Ajith Kumar | | |
| 1993 | Pudhiya Mugam | Vineeth | | |
| 1993 | Ennamo Nadakkuthu | Venkatesh | Lent his voice for Tamil dubbed version | |
| 1994 | Paasamalargal | Ajith Kumar | | |
| 1994 | Kaadhalan | Prabhu Deva | | |
| 1994 | The Lion King | Jeremy Irons | Voice for character Scar in Tamil dubbed version | |
| 1994 | Ennavale Adi Ennavale | Jayaram | Lent his voice for Tamil dubbed version | |
| 1995 | Raasaiyya | Prabhu Deva | | |
| 1995 | Kuruthipunal | John Edathattil | | |
| 1996 | Kadhal Desam | Abbas | | |
| 1996 | Karuppu Roja | Amar Siddique | | |
| 1997 | Minsara Kanavu | Prabhu Deva (For 3 scenes) | | |
| 1997 | Ullaasam | Raju Sundaram | for the voiceover in the song "Valibam Vaazha"; ending rap portion done by Prabhu Deva | |
| 1997 | VIP | Abbas, Prabhu Deva | | |
| 1997 | Poochudava | Abbas | | |
| 1998 | Ini Ellam Sugame | Abbas | | |
| 1998 | Jolly | Abbas | | |
| 1998 | Aasai Thambi | Abbas | | |
| 1998 | Satya | J. D. Chakravarthy | Lent his voice for Tamil dubbed version | |
| 1998 | Gandhi | Ben Kingsley | Lent his voice for Tamil dubbed version | |
| 1999 | Devi | Shiju | Lent his voice for Tamil dubbed version | |
| 1999 | Kannodu Kanbathellam | Suchindra Bali | | |
| 2000 | Kandukondain Kandukondain | Abbas | | |
| 2022 | Cobra | Sarjano Khalid | Lent his voice to teenage version of himself | |
| 2024 | ARM | Cosmic creator (Narrator) | Lent his voice for Tamil dubbed version | |

== Television ==
Vikram television credits
| Year | Title | Role | Director | Notes | Ref. |
|---|---|---|---|---|---|
| 1988 | Galatta Kudumbam | Vinod | Unknown | Six-episode TV series | |
| 1995 | Chinna Chinna Aasai – Aarambam | Dubbing voice for Rajiv Krishna | Heera Rajagopal | TV series | |
| 1995 | Chinna Chinna Aasai – Elakiya | Shankar | Himself | TV series | |
| 1999 | Siragugal | Chandrasekhar | Manobala | TV film | |

== Commercial ==
Vikram commercial credits
| Year | Organization | Director(s) | Role | Ref. |
|---|---|---|---|---|
| 1993 | Chola Tea | Unknown | King | |
| Unknown | TVS Excel | Unknown | Himself | |
| Unknown | Allwyn Watches | Unknown | Himself | |
| 2005 | Coca-Cola | Rajiv Menon | Various | |
| 2010 | Brooke Bond | Karthik Kotamraju | Himself | |
| 2010 | Manappuram General Finance and Leasing | Priyadarshan; V. A. Shrikumar | Himself | |
| 2011 | Josco Jewellers | Rathish Ambat | Himself | |

== Music video ==
Vikram music video credits
| Year | Title | Composer | Director | Role | Notes | Ref. |
|---|---|---|---|---|---|---|
| 2010 | "Phir Mile Sur Mera Tumhara" | Louis Banks | Kailash Surendranath | Himself | Non-album single | |
| 2012 | "One – The Unity Song" | George Peter | Sumesh Lal | Himself | Non-album single | |
| 2012 | "Vanakkam Vaazhavaikum Chennai" | Girishh G | Pandiraj | Himself | Promotional video for the film Marina | |
| 2016 | "Spirit of Chennai" | C. Girinandh | Vikram | Himself | Non-album single | |

== Short film ==
Vikram short film credits
| Year | Title | Director | Role | Notes | Ref. |
|---|---|---|---|---|---|
| 2016 | Goodnight Charlie | Dhruv Vikram | Producer | | |

== See also ==
- List of awards and nominations received by Vikram
