= List of awards and nominations received by Vikram =

Vikram awards and nominations
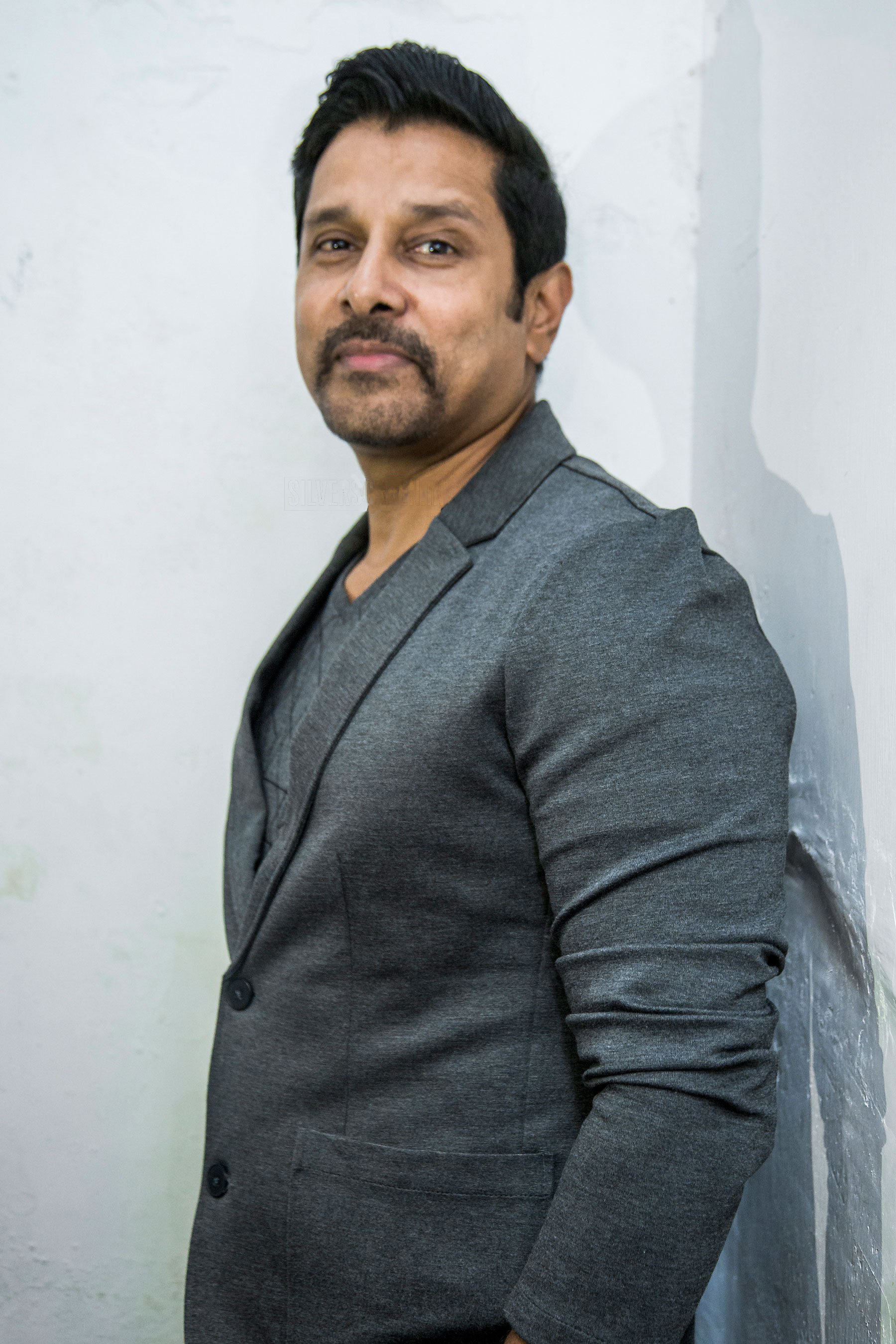
- Vikram in 2016
Awards and nominations
Award	Wins	Nominations

Vikram is an Indian actor who works prominently in Tamil film industry. After making his cinematic debut in the 1990 film En Kadhal Kanmani, he acted in a series of small-budget Tamil, Telugu and Malayalam films. It was Bala's tragedy movie Sethu (1999) that established Vikram in the Tamil film industry. In the early 2000s Vikram appeared in a series of masala films—Dhill, Gemini, Dhool and Saamy all becoming commercially successful. During this period, Vikram performed diverse roles and received critical acclaim for his performances in Kasi and Samurai. In 2003, Vikram's performance as an autistic gravedigger in Pithamagan won a lot of acclaim and secured his first National Film Award for Best Actor. His portrayal as an innocent man with dissociative identity disorder in Shankar's Anniyan was commercially successful. Vikram's portrayal as a tribal leader in Mani Ratnam's Raavanan saw him secure further acclaim. The last three films also won him three Filmfare Awards for Best Actor – Tamil. He is only the third actor to receive a National Film Award for Best Actor in the Tamil film industry.

Vikram is known for his intense performances, with his work often fetching critical acclaim and commercial success. He has won a National Film Award and nine Filmfare Awards South, of which five are Best Actor awards.Three state awards for best actor.

== Award categories ==
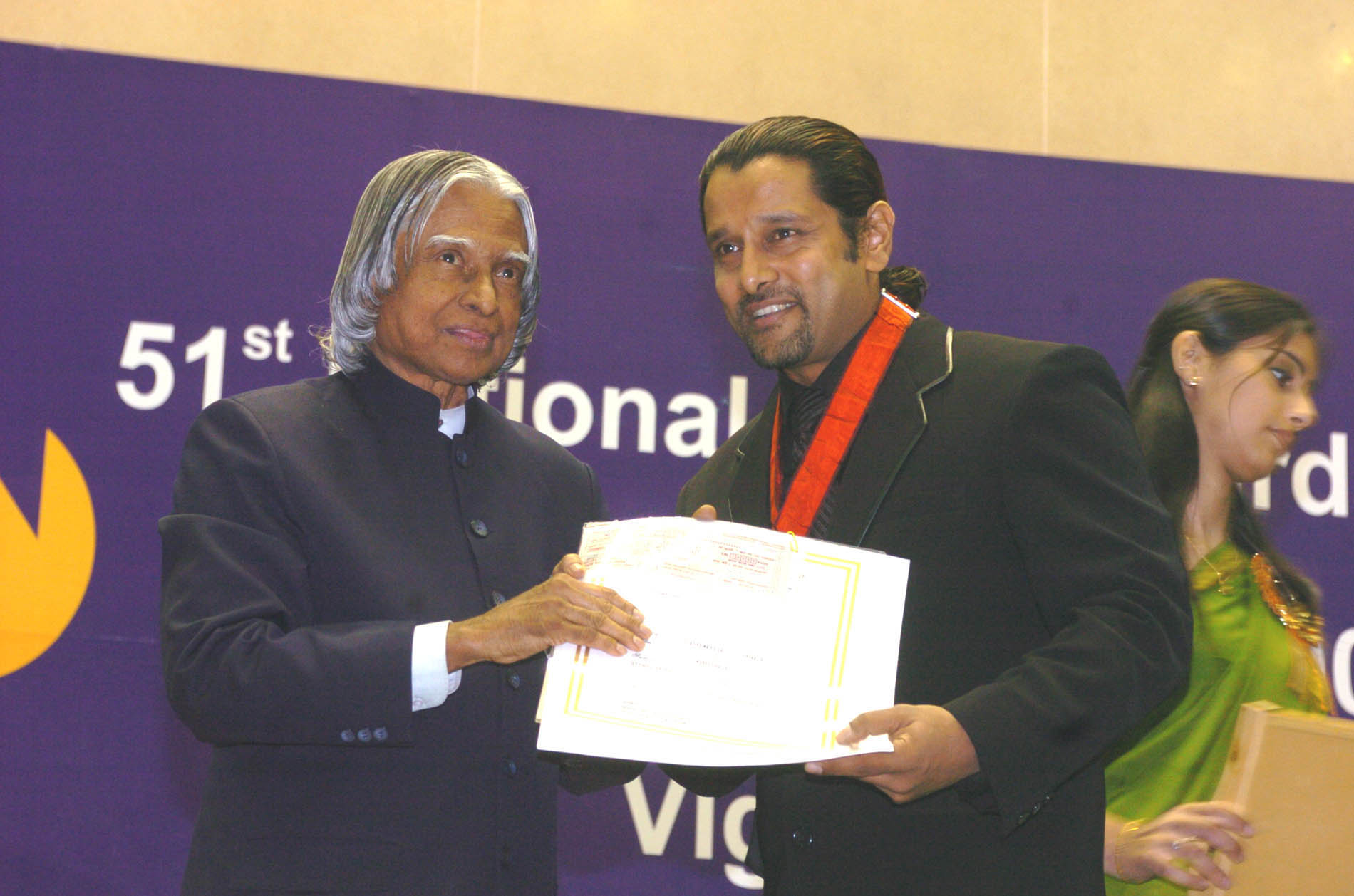
Vikram receiving the National film award

=== Asianet Film Awards ===
The Asianet Film Awards are presented annually by Asianet, a television network based in Kerala.

Year	Film	Category	Result	Ref.
2015	I	Popular Tamil Actor	Won	

=== CineMAA Awards ===
The CineMAA Awards are presented annually by Movie Artists Association Group, a television network based in Hyderabad.

Year	Film	Category	Result	Ref.
2003	Sivaputrudu / Pithamagan	South India's Best Actor	Won	

=== Amrita TV-FEFKA Film Awards ===
The Amrita TV-FEFKA Film Awards are presented by Amrita TV along with FEFKA (Film Employees Federation of Kerala) to honor artistic excellence in Malayalam and Tamil films.

Year	Film	Category	Result	Ref.
2010	Raavanan	Best Actor – Tamil	Won	

=== Cinema Express Awards ===
The Cinema Express Awards are presented by the Indian Express Group to honour artistic excellence of professionals in the south Indian film industry which comprises Tamil, Telugu, Kannada and Malayalam film industries.

Year	Film(s)	Category	Result	Ref.
2001	Kasi	Best Actor	Won	

=== Filmfare Awards South ===
The Filmfare Awards South is given by the Filmfare Magazine as part of its annual Filmfare Awards. The awards are presented separately for the Tamil, Telugu, Kannada and Malayalam films.

Year	Film	Category	Result	Ref.
1999	Sethu	Special Jury Award	Won	
1999	Sethu	Best Actor – Tamil	Nominated	
2001	Kasi	Best Actor – Tamil	Won	
2003	Pithamagan	Best Actor – Tamil	Won	
2003	Saamy	Best Actor – Tamil	Nominated	
2005	Anniyan	Best Actor – Tamil	Won	
2010	Raavanan	Best Actor – Tamil	Won	
2011	Deiva Thirumagal	Best Actor – Tamil	Nominated	
2011	Deiva Thirumagal	Critics Best Actor – Tamil	Won	
2012	Thaandavam	Best Actor – Tamil	Nominated	
2015	I	Best Actor – Tamil	Won	
2016	Iru Mugan	Best Actor – Tamil	Nominated	
2022	Ponniyin Selvan: I	Best Actor – Tamil	Nominated	
2023	Ponniyin Selvan: II	Best Actor – Tamil	Won	
2024	Thangalaan	Best Actor – Tamil	Nominated	
2024	Thangalaan	Best Outstanding Performance	Won	

=== Honorary Doctorate ===
Year	University	Ref.
2011	Università Popolare degli Studi di Milano (People's University of Milan)	

=== International Tamil Film Awards ===
The International Tamil Film Awards (ITFA) is an award ceremony that honours artistic excellence in Tamil films. The awards were first presented in 2003.

Year	Film	Category	Result	Ref.
2002	Gemini	Best Actor	Won	

=== Jaya Awards ===
The Jaya Awards have been presented by the Tamil television channel Jaya TV since 2011 to honour excellence in Tamil cinema.

Year	Film	Category	Result	Ref.
2011	Deivathirumagal	Jury awards- Best Actor	Won	

=== Edison Awards ===
The Edison Awards have been presented by the Tamil television channel MyTamilMovie.com since 2009 to honour excellence in Tamil cinema.

Year	Film	Category	Result	Ref.
2012	Thaandavam	Best Actor	Won	
2015	I	Mass Hero	Nominated	

=== National Film Awards ===
The National Film Award for Best Actor is a part of the National Film Awards presented annually to an actor who has delivered the best performance in a leading role within the Indian film industry.

Year	Film	Category	Result	Ref.
2003	Pithamagan	Best Actor	Won	

=== South Indian International Movie Awards ===
Year	Film	Category	Result	Ref.
2011	Deiva Thirumagal	Best Actor (Special Appreciation)	Won	
2011	Deiva Thirumagal	Best Actor	Nominated	
2015	I	Best Actor	Won	
2016	Iru Mugan	Best Actor	Nominated	
2022	Mahaan & Ponniyin Selvan: I	Best Actor	Nominated	
2023	Ponniyin Selvan: II	Best Actor	Won	

=== Star Screen Awards ===
Year	Film	Category	Result	Ref.
2010	Raavan	Best Supporting Actor	Nominated	

=== Tamil Nadu State Film Awards ===
The Tamil Nadu State Film Awards are presented annually by the Government of Tamil Nadu.

Year	Film	Category	Result	Ref.
1999	Sethu	Special Jury Award	Won	
2003	Pithamagan	Best Actor	Won	
2006	Sivaji Ganesan Award (Honorary)		Won	
2010	Raavanan	Best Actor	Won	

=== Vijay Awards ===
The Vijay Awards have been presented by the Tamil television channel STAR Vijay since 2006 to honour excellence in Tamil cinema.

Year	Film	Category	Result	Ref.
2006	Icon of the Year		Won	
2008	Bheema	Favourite Hero	Nominated	
2009	Kanthaswamy	Favourite Hero	Nominated	
2010	Raavanan	Best Actor	Won	
2011	Deiva Thirumagal	Best Actor	Won	
2011	Deiva Thirumagal	Favourite Hero	Nominated	
2012	Thaandavam	Best Actor	Nominated	

=== Vikatan Award ===
Ananda Vikatan, one of the leading weeklies of Tamil Nadu has been awarding the films, actors and technicians on various criteria.

Year	Film	Category	Result	Ref.
2011	Deiva Thirumagal	Best Actor	Won	
