= Thanthu Vitten Ennai =

- Title card
- Directed by: C. V. Sridhar
- Written by: C. V. Sridhar
- Produced by: C. V. Sridhar
- Starring: Vikram; Rohini
- Cinematography: Siva
- Edited by: Chandran
- Music by: Ilaiyaraaja
- Production company: Chithralaya
- Release date: 21 June 1991
- Running time: 134 minutes
- Country: India
- Language: Tamil

Thanthu Vitten Ennai (transl. I gave myself) is a 1991 Indian Tamil-language romantic drama film starring Vikram and Rohini. This was the last film directed by C. V. Sridhar. It was released on 21 June 1991.

== Plot ==
The story revolves around two graduates Rajasekhar and Surya who meet up in an accidental interview. They develop love towards each other. Will destiny unite them or not makes the rest of story.

== Cast ==
- Vikram as Raju
- Rohini as Surya
- Ravichandran as Kalyani's husband (guest appearance)
- Manorama as Parvathi
- Ramaprabha as Kalyani
- Kamala Kamesh as Surya's caretaker
- Gayathri in a guest appearance
- I.S.R
- Hanumanthu
- Dagla Ramu
- Thideer Kannaiah as pedestrian

Uncredited

- Zakir Hussain as Gautham
- Swaminathan as a security guard
- Bharathiraja in a guest appearance

== Production ==
Vikram was cast in the film while working on En Kadhal Kanmani (1990) after being tipped off about the opportunity by his father, Vinod Raj. Director C. V. Sridhar had wanted to cast a debutant actor, so Vikram kept his involvement in his earlier project a secret from the director, so Sridhar could cast him. It became Sridhar's final film before his death in 2008. In 2013, Vikram revealed that he chose to work on the film with Sridhar, despite the celebrated director's declining career, feeling it could have marked a comeback.

== Soundtrack ==
The film had six songs composed by Ilaiyaraaja. The song "Mannavane" is set in the Carnatic raga Arabhi.

| Song title | Singers | Lyrics | Length |
|---|---|---|---|
| "Kangalukul" | S. Janaki | Pulamaipithan | 4:37 |
| "Mannavane" | S. Janaki, S. P. Balasubrahmanyam | Gangai Amaran | 4:36 |
| "Muthamma" | Arunmozhi, Uma Ramanan | Ilaiyaraaja | 4:47 |
| "Thenral Nee" | S. Janaki, S. P. Balasubramanyam | Mu. Metha | 4:26 |
| "Manasuloni" | S. Janaki | Tyagaraja | 5:50 |

== Reception ==
N. Krishnaswamy of The Indian Express wrote, "The theme that Sridhar seems to be driving is nebulous, if indeed there is a theme".
