= Vikram (actor) =

Indian actor and playback singer (born 1966)

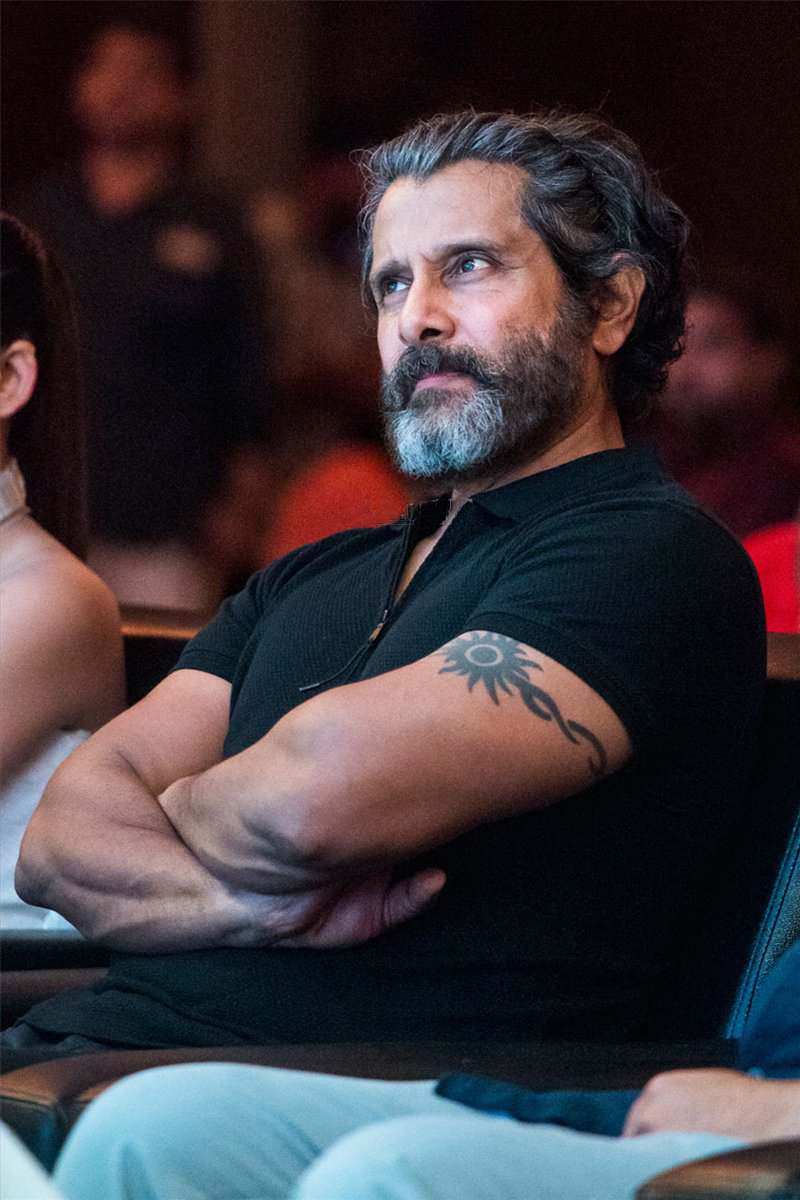
- Vikram in 2019
- Born: Kennedy John Victor; 17 April 1966 (age 60); Madras, Tamil Nadu, India
- Other names: Chiyaan, Kenny
- Education: Loyola College, Chennai, Pachaiyappa's College
- Occupations: Actor; Playback singer
- Years active: 1988–present
- Works: Full list
- Spouse: Shailaja Balakrishnan (m. 1992)
- Children: 2; including Dhruv
- Parent: Vinod Raj (father)
- Awards: Full list
- Honours: Kalaimamani (2004)

Kennedy John Victor (born 17 April 1966), known professionally as Vikram, is an Indian actor and playback singer who predominantly works in Tamil cinema. One of the highest paid actors, he is also among the most decorated actors in Indian cinema, with laurels including nine Filmfare Awards South, a National Film Award, four Tamil Nadu State Film Awards and the Kalaimamani Award from the Government of Tamil Nadu. Based on the earnings of Indian celebrities, Vikram was included in the Forbes India Celebrity 100 list for 2016 and 2018.

Vikram debuted with the romance En Kadhal Kanmani (1990). His major breakthrough was the portrayal of a rogue-turned-lover in Bala's tragedy Sethu (1999). He also earned widespread critical acclaim for diverse roles of disadvantaged people in Kasi (2001), Samurai (2002), and Pithamagan (2003); the latter won him the National Film Award for Best Actor. He appeared in hit films like Dhill (2001), Gemini (2002), Dhool (2003), Saamy (2003), Anniyan (2005), Raavanan (2010), Deiva Thirumagal (2011) and Iru Mugan (2016). Vikram's highest-grossing releases came with the romantic thriller I (2015) and the epic historical dramas Ponniyin Selvan: I (2022) and Ponniyin Selvan: II (2023).

Vikram has promoted various social causes and appeared as the Youth Envoy for the United Nations Human Settlements Programme in 2011. He has been a brand ambassador of Sanjeevani Trust and a school for special children, Vidya Sudha, which he stayed at during the making of Deiva Thirumagal as well as having long-term associations with the Kasi Eye Care and running his own welfare association through the Vikram Foundation. In 2016, he produced and directed the video to the flood relief anthem, Spirit of Chennai, as a tribute to the city's volunteers following the 2015 South Indian floods.

== Early life and family ==
Vikram was born as Kennedy John Victor on 17 April 1966 to a Tamil family: a Christian father and a Hindu mother. His father, John Victor (alias Vinod Raj) was a native of Paramakudi who left his home to start a career in films, but worked only in minor roles. Vikram's mother, Rajeshwari, was a government officer who reached the rank of sub-collector. Rajeshwari was born in a Hindu family with film connections. Her brother, Thiagarajan, is an established director-actor in the Tamil film industry; he is the father of actor Prashanth, making him Vikram's first cousin (although the two have never openly acknowledged this relationship). Vikram has two siblings, both younger to him. His brother, Arvind, appeared in the low-budget Tamil film, Eppo Kalyanam (2022). His sister, Anitha, is a teacher.

Vikram's father, Vinod Raj, was a small time actor who did not fare successfully in films and only managed to act in supporting roles in Tamil films and television serials. This inspired Vikram to take theatre lessons and become professionally trained in classical and cinema dance forms to ensure that he became a leading actor. Vikram decided to use a screen name because he disliked his original name, Kennedy, and he also felt that such a foreign name was not a fit name for an actor in Tamil films. He took the name Vikram (a Hindu name) which means "man who does great deeds." In one interview, he said that he was also inspired to take the name because it was a mixture of several names dear to him: "Vi" from his father's name (Vinod), "K" from Kennedy, "Ra" from his mother's name (Rajeshwari) and "ram" from his sun sign, Aries.

Vikram was educated at Montfort School, Yercaud (a boarding school in a hill station near Salem) and graduated in 1983. He has mentioned that he used his opportunities at school well by taking part in karate, horseback riding and swimming and noted that such early exposure to activities gave him confidence as a youngster. Vikram lurked in the fringes of the school's theatre club for a long period and often took part in backstage work before being handed the lead role in a school adaptation of Molière's The Doctor in Spite of Himself after the original lead had contracted chicken pox. Despite expressing his interest to join films after school, his father forced him to go through education and Vikram subsequently graduated from Loyola College, Chennai with a degree in English Literature and worked halfway towards an MBA programme. Through the prolific dramatics club, Vikram appeared in stage productions including college adaptations of The Caine Mutiny Court-Martial and Peter Shaffer's Black Comedy, receiving best actor awards for his performances. After winning a Best Actor Award at a function held at IIT Madras, Vikram was hit by a truck during a ride on his motorbike on the way home and suffered a serious leg injury. He remained hospital-ridden for three years during college and subsequently went through twenty-three surgeries to prevent his leg from being amputated. Vikram then returned to finish the final year of his degree after his accident and secured permission to finish his dissertation at home, as he was only able to walk on crutches for a short period.

== Acting career ==
=== 1988–1998: Early struggle ===
Vikram began his professional career by modelling in advert films for brands including Chola Tea, TVS Excel and Alwyn watches as well as appearing in a six episode television serial titled Galatta Kudumbam, which aired between November and December 1988. During the final year of his M.B.A programme at Loyola College, he was recognised by the film industry, with veteran director C. V. Sridhar approaching him for a lead role in a film. Vikram made his film debut in 1990 by appearing in En Kadhal Kanmani, a small-budget love story featuring him alongside Rekha Nambiar, with Sridhar's Thanthu Vitten Ennai, opposite Rohini being his next release. He then signed on to be a part of cinematographer P. C. Sriram's college love story Meera, with high expectations, however, the three films failed to launch his career. His appearances in Meera and in Kaaval Geetham, with another veteran director S. P. Muthuraman, helped him secure film offers from the Malayalam and Telugu film industries. In 1993, he almost signed on to appear in Mani Ratnam's Bombay and featured in the initial photo shoot alongside Manisha Koirala. However, Mani Ratnam wanted Vikram to remove his beard for the role, and Vikram could not do so due to continuity problems with another film Pudhiya Mannargal he had signed and hence was dropped from the project.

During his struggling phase, Vikram dubbed for other heroes in films including voices for Ajith Kumar in Amaravathi and Prabhu Deva in Kaadhalan, respectively. Vikram has mentioned that he did not look down on dubbing and saw it as a "dignity of labour". During the period, he also attended dancing classes every day, and tried acting out different scenes and different characters with his small group of friends.

Between 1993 and 1994, Vikram played supporting roles in a series of films. He appeared in three successful Malayalam films by appearing with Mammootty, Suresh Gopi and Jayaram in Joshi's successful action film Dhruvam, before teaming up with Gopi again for Shaji Kailas's Mafia, which explored Bangalore's criminal underworld. Furthermore, Joshi cast him again alongside Mammootty in the action drama Sainyam in the role of an air cadet. During the period, Vikram also appeared in the small budget Telugu film Chirunavvula Varamistava in the lead role and as one of Akkineni Nageswara Rao's sons in the family drama Bangaru Kutumbam, with both films failing to give him a breakthrough although the latter was a box office success. A brief return to Tamil films also proved unsuccessful, with his role in Vikraman's multi-starrer Pudhiya Mannargal, with music composed by A. R. Rahman turning out to be a commercial failure.

Throughout 1995 and 1996, Vikram appeared in further Telugu and Malayalam films to receive income, being kept away from Tamil films due to a lack of offers. He played the second lead in the Malayalam film Mayooranritham directed by Vijayakrishnan and even played villain in Street opposite Babu Antony. He had lead roles in the small budget Telugu films Aadaalla Majaka and Sriraj Ginne's Akka! Bagunnava?. He collaborated again with Mammootty in Indraprastham and Suresh Gopi in Rajaputhran, before appearing in his first lead role in Malayalam with Itha Oru Snehagatha opposite Laila. Vikram signed Amitabh Bachchan's first Tamil language film production, Ullaasam, which also featured Ajith Kumar and Maheswari. The big budget film created anticipation prior to release, but was average run at the box office. However, Vikram acknowledged the film for expanding his female fan base as a result of the soft-personality of his character. In 1998, he followed it up with appearance in the unnoticed romantic film Kangalin Vaarthaigal.

=== 1999–2003: Breakthrough and critical acclaim ===
He played a short role in Parthiban's critically acclaimed film House Full (1999), respectively. In 1999, he played the eponymous lead in debutant director Bala's romantic drama Sethu. To prepare for the character, which was also referred to as Chiyaan, Vikram shaved his head, lost 21 kilograms and grew his nails long for the role. After beginning production in April 1997, the film went through development hell after industry strikes and lack of funds hampered progress. During this phase, he did not accept other acting offers to maintain the continuity of his looks. The film then struggled to find a distributor, who shunned it due to the tragic climax and the film remained unreleased. Vikram described the period of production as "the worst phase of his career" as he was financially strapped and "his fire was in danger of dying down". He turned down an opportunity from a friend to take up a job in technology and attempted to stay in the industry by directing a serial titled Mounam Pesiyadhey, with Ameer as his assistant director. Sethu finally released in December 1999 and initially began running at a single noon show at a suburban theater, but gradually gained an audience through word-of-mouth publicity. Eventually, it ran for over 100 days at several cinema halls across Chennai. Vikram was constantly being mobbed by people on the streets as a result of the film's success. Critics highly praised Vikram's performance with a reviewer referring to Vikram as "a revelation" and that "he is very natural and his acting in last few scenes are just too good and could even be compared with the best we have seen". Similarly, a critic from the Malaysian daily New Straits Times, described the film as an "unforgettable experience" and described Vikram's performance as "praise-worthy". The performance drew accolades with Vikram winning the Filmfare Special Award – South and the Tamil Nadu State Film Award Special Prize, in addition to his first nomination for the Filmfare Award for Best Actor – Tamil for his portrayal of the title character, while reports emerged that he missed out on the National Film Award for Best Actor by a single vote to Mohanlal. Post-Sethu, Vikram has said that the film would always remain close to him regardless of its commercial success and that it put him on the "right path", with Vikram choosing to adapt the prefix of Chiyaan to his screen name.

He began to turn down chances to play supporting roles in films and was intent on making a breakthrough as a lead actor and notably turned down the role of Swarnamalya's fiancée in Mani Ratnam's Alai Payuthey. Vikram also rejected approaches from television serial producers, citing that working in television would reduce his chances of becoming a mainstream actor. He also refused opportunities to take part in film events as a backing dancer, with actor Sriman revealing that Vikram was "one amongst not many" who was not interested in travelling to Canada to participate in such shows.

Vikram did not sign up to a film for 65 days after the release of Sethu, to ensure that he made the right career move. Vikram spent time completing projects he had agreed to feature in before the release of Sethu and hence made a couple of appearances in the Malayalam films Red Indians and the horror film Indriyam. He also played a leading role in Siragugal, a rare Tamil telefilm produced and featuring Radhika, which was shot entirely in the suburbs of London. Furthermore, he also completed two Telugu films during the period; 9 Nelalu and Youth, the latter of which had a delayed release. 9 Nelalu featured Vikram as the husband of the character played by Soundarya, who faces the challenges of being a surrogate mother. The film won positive reviews, with a critic mentioning that Vikram gave a "controlled performance" while Vikram's newfound popularity in Tamil films saw the film dubbed into Tamil soon after as Kandaen Seethaiyai, with an inserted comedy track by comedian Vivek. His next release was Rajakumaran's Vinnukum Mannukum, alongside Sarath Kumar, Khushbu and Devayani, which revolved around an ordinary boy falling in love with an actress. Vikram has since mentioned his displeasure at being a part of the film, claiming that he had arguments with the director for every single shot and that "everything in that film, right from the first shot was wrong"; the film became a failure commercially.

His next film was Dhill, where he played an aspiring police officer, Kanagavel, who tackles a corrupt policeman. To appear trim in the role of the aspiring police officer, Vikram went on a strict diet eating only fruits and drinking juice. The film opened to positive reviews, with a critic from The Hindu claiming that "Vikram has the ability and potential" and that "Vikram has once again proved that his success in Sethu was not a fluke". Dhill subsequently went on to become Vikram's first success in the masala film genre and led the way for more such films in the same genre for him. Vikram's portrayal of a blind folk singer in Vinayan's Kasi won him his first Filmfare Award for Best Actor – Tamil and the film also proved to be a commercial success. For the film, he sunbathed on the terrace of his beachside home in Chennai for a sunburnt look and got dizzying headaches while practising to look blind. Again, Vikram's performance won positive reviews from critics, with a reviewer describing it as an "extraordinarily detailed performance" and that "as the blind singer, he brings laughter, tears and a lump in one's throat".

The following year, Vikram went on to play the title role in Saran's Gemini, produced by AVM Productions, his first big-budget film in the Tamil industry, which featured him in the role of a local rowdy. The action film received positive reviews, with a critic citing that Vikram "delivers a convincing performance" and consequently became a "box office triumph". Similarly, the film's soundtrack composed by Bharadwaj had become popular prior to release, with Vikram also singing a version of the hit song "O Podu!" for the album. Balaji Sakthivel's Samurai was his next release, featuring him as a vigilante Robin Hood-esque figure who kidnapped corrupt politicians. Vikram had signed the film in early 2000 and the film was on hold during production, leading to a two-year delay and the film finally opened to average reviews and box office collections. The critic from The Hindu gave praise for Vikram's "admirably well-maintained physique and powerful eyes", whilst another labelled that the film's single major positive was Vikram's convincing portrayal. His final release of the year was Prabhu Solomon's King, a drama film which featured him alongside Sneha and Nassar. Vikram played Raja, a magician, who is unaware that he has been diagnosed with multiple sclerosis, with his family trying to keep the truth away from him. The film also met with an unfavorable response commercially, but received positive reviews from critics.

The success of Dharani's Dhill resulted in the film's team collaborating to make a film in a similar genre; Dhool, which also featured Jyothika, Reemma Sen and Vivek. The film saw Vikram play Aarumugham, a villager, who comes to the city seeking help in regard to a water crisis back home, but subsequently ends up tackling the corrupt politicians who are behind the water scam. In regard to his performance, the Rediff.com review praised his enactment, citing that "Vikram is at his peak" and that "he seems as much at home with comedy as with action, in romance as in emotional sequences", while the critic from The Hindu also praised his performance. The film became a blockbuster and his fifth success in two and a half years, with Vikram being dubbed as "the matinee idol of our times" by a leading Indian newspaper. He also featured in the romantic film Kadhal Sadugudu, with Priyanka Trivedi which was a critical and commercial failure, with reviewers claiming that "there are times you wish Vikram were a little more brisk and dynamic" in regard to his performance. After release, Vikram was critical of the film's failure, confessing that the story "underwent a lot of changes after the initial narration", lamenting that he was "taken for a royal ride" by the producers.

Vikram was then signed on by K. Balachander to appear in his banner's biggest production at the time, the masala film Saamy, directed by Hari. Vikram played Aarusaamy, an honest cop working in Tirunelveli, who solves the region's communal problems with his down-to-earth approach. Vikram worked on his body for the film, sporting a thick waist to show notable differences from his other police film, Dhill and also put on eight kilograms. The film took a large opening, grossing over Rs. 70 million in 10 days in Tamil Nadu, while also taking the largest opening of the new millennium in Kerala, with the Telugu remake rights also sold for a record price. Due to the good opening, the film has proved to be profitable just 10 days after its release and consequently went on to become a blockbuster. Vikram's performance was acclaimed by critics, with a critic from Sify claiming that Vikram had "succumbed to the superstar image trap", but is the "mainstay of the picture".

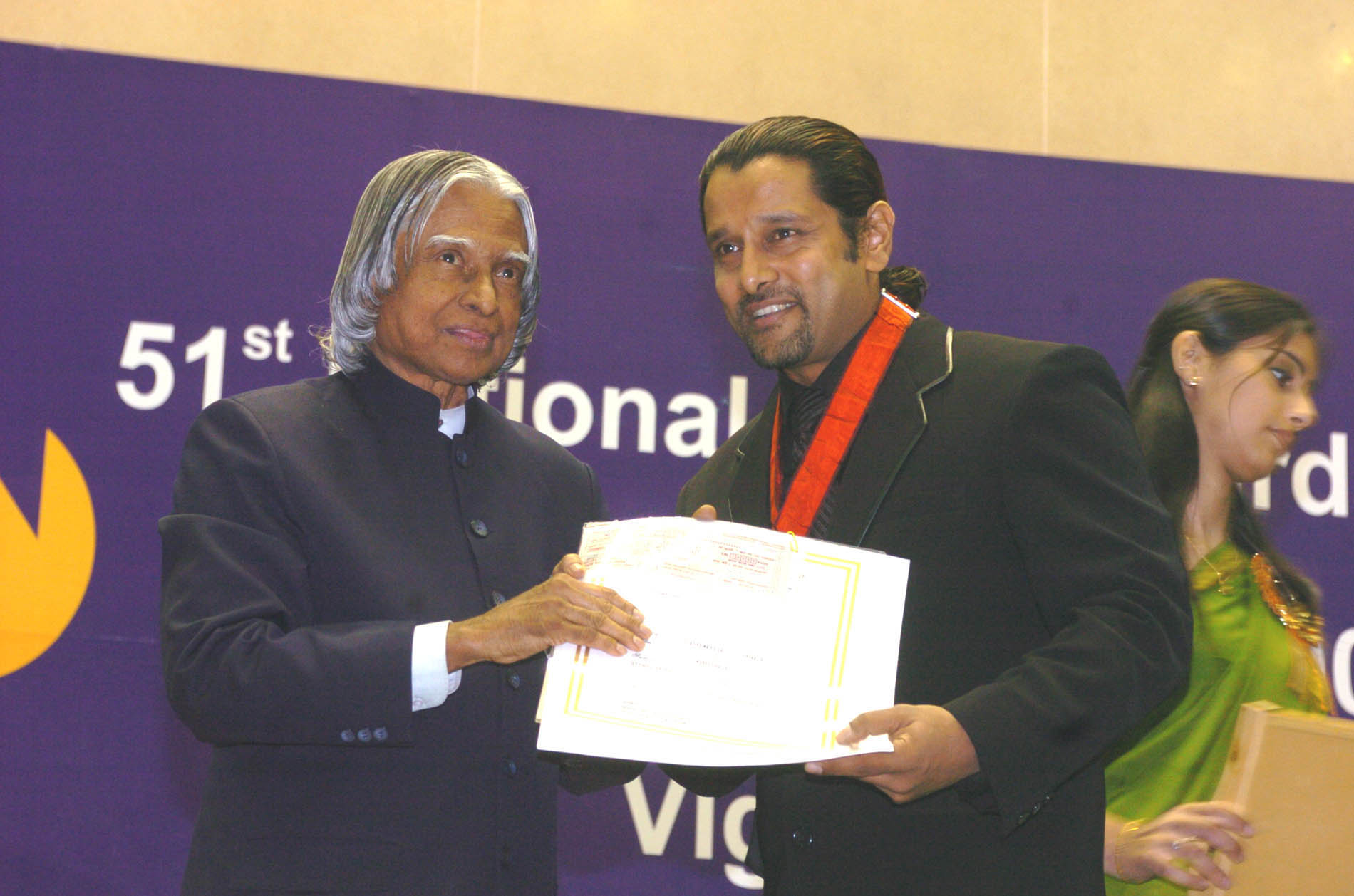
Vikram receiving the National Film Award from A.P.J. Abdul Kalam for his performance in Pithamagan in 2005

Later that year, he starred in Bala's crime drama Pithamagan, alongside Suriya, Sangeetha and Laila, playing the role of Chitthan, a gravedigger with autism spectrum disorders. He did not have any dialogue in the film and the actor's acting muscles were stretched as he had to use body language and facial expressions to convey his feelings and thoughts, with Vikram also applying the make-up for the character himself. The film received highly positive reviews upon release, with a critic from The Hindu calling it a "symphony on celluloid", while noting that it will be a "milestone in Vikram's career" and "he carves a niche for himself in the viewer's mind with his expressions and excellent body language". His performance earned him the National Film Award for Best Actor, with the latter accolade making him only the third Tamil actor to win the award; he also received two nominations for the Filmfare Award for Best Actor – Tamil for Saamy and Pithamagan, winning for the latter, his second win in the category.

=== 2004–2009: Established actor ===
His next release was the revenge drama Arul, directed by Hari. The film received mixed to positive reviews and moderate box office collections.

Vikram signed on to feature in the action thriller Anniyan, directed by prominent director Shankar in March 2004. Vikram agreed to shoot for the film for 140 days, which was revealed to be amongst the longest contracts signed by an actor in a Tamil film. The film featured him as a character suffering from dissociative identity disorder with three distinct personae: a meek lawyer, a suave fashion model and a psychotic serial killer. Prior to release, the film was touted as the most expensive South Indian film ever, costing Rs 263.8 million, and was released across India with 400 prints. Anniyan took an "extraordinary opening", and went on to become a blockbuster grossing more than Rs. 1 billion through the original and two dubbed versions. Vikram's performance received widespread critical acclaim, with a reviewer from Sify citing that "Anniyan truly belongs to Vikram and the film is unthinkable without him" and "it is a role that could have been reduced to a caricature by a lesser actor". Anniyan won several accolades at award ceremonies the following year, with Vikram winning his third Filmfare Award for Best Actor – Tamil for his performance in the film.

Later in the year, he signed and completed Shafi's comedy film with Asin, Majaa, in less than five months. The film which also featured Pasupathy as his brother, saw Vikram work as the assistant director under Shafi. Majaa faced a poor response at the box office and fetched average reviews, with a reviewer citing that "you will surely find something missing".

Vikram then signed up for Bheema in October 2005, with the film facing severe delays and only releasing in January 2008. The film saw him portray Sekhar, who grows up idolizing the gangster played by Prakash Raj, and Vikram revealed that he approached the film like an actor, even though the film's script was written "for a star". Upon release, the film gained mixed reviews though reviewers praised Vikram's performance, with a critic claiming that "Vikram breathes life into the film", "he looks sensational with his toned body, killer looks and unarguably delivers yet another outstanding performance of his career" and to "see the film only for him". Similarly, the review from The Hindu was critical of the excessive violence and mentioned that "as narration gives way after a point, Vikram can only appear helpless". His next release, Kanthaswamy, directed by Susi Ganesan and also featuring Shriya Saran, became the first superhero film in Tamil cinema, with Vikram being featured as a vigilante dressed as an anthropomorphic rooster, Kokorako and a CBI Officer. Kanthaswamy became Vikram's most expensive production beating Anniyan, with the film boasting of high production values of having an innovative pre-launch trailer and with scenes shot in Italy and Mexico. The film earned a mixed response from critics, with the reviewer from Sify claiming that the film "strikes a fine balance between style and substance" and proceeding to state that "Vikram is mesmerizing and has given an extra dimension to the characters he plays in the film and steers it to the winning post", suggesting that "there are very few people in Indian cinema who can do the larger-than-life fantasy characters as easily as Vikram". Sudhish Kamath of The Hindu labelled the film as "slow death", claiming that "as an actor, Vikram has nothing to do". The film took a strong opening, with a collection of Rs. 370 million, including Rs. 160 million in Tamil Nadu, at the box office in the opening week of its international release. The film subsequently went on to become one of the most profitable films of the year and ran in theaters for over one hundred days.

=== 2010–2014: Career expansion ===
Vikram then featured in Mani Ratnam's bilingual films Raavanan and Raavan, inspired by the ancient Sanskrit epic Ramayana, with Vikram featuring as the tribal leader, Veeraiya, in the Tamil version and the cop, Dev Pratap Sharma, in the Hindi version of the films, which were shot simultaneously. Vikram revealed that changes between the two characters during filming took up to 45 minutes, with Abhishek Bachchan playing the tribal leader in the Hindi version, whilst Prithviraj played the cop in the Tamil version, with Aishwarya Rai as the female lead. Vikram was initially apprehensive, because both roles were to be shot almost simultaneously, but revealed that he succeeded by showing differences in his body language and expressions. Vikram revealed that he and Abhishek Bachchan played the roles in the respective versions without inspiration from one another. Despite being a non-speaker and making his debut in Hindi, he dubbed his lines in the language, remarking jovially that it was the "most difficult thing in the world". After promotions at the Cannes Film Festival and a premiere at Leicester Square in London, the two versions and the dubbed Telugu version released simultaneously in 2,200 screens worldwide and took a big opening on day one, earning 200 million. The Tamil version, Raavanan won rave reviews from critics, with The Hindu calling it a "master-stroke" and claiming that Vikram "raises the bar higher with every venture". The critic cited that "emotions of love, animus, anguish and joy dance on his face in quick succession", concluding that "Vikram lifts the role to an admirable level". The critic from Sify labelled it as an "astonishing portrayal", while the critic from the Hindustan Times praised Vikram's "ability to get into Veeraiya's skin and emote with conviction". The Tamil version emerged as a commercial success, with Vikram's performance winning him his fourth Filmfare Award for Best Actor – Tamil among other accolades. In contrast, the Hindi version fetched mixed reviews, with critics agreeing that Vikram's performance as the tribal leader was more convincing than Bachchan's. Baradwaj Rangan, writing for The New Indian Express rated the film 4/5 and said: "Raavan falls for Sita (and vice versa) in an intriguingly idiosyncratic take on the Ramayana – if you can get past the lead performances, that is". Whereas, Taran Adarsh, writing for Bollywood Hungama rated it 1 1/2 out of 5 and said: "On the whole, Raavan is a king-sized disappointment, in terms of content" though mentioning that Vikram was "first-rate, although the role isn't substantial enough". Raavan subsequently went on to become a surprise flop at the Indian box office. The film was also screened at the Venice Film Festival and the Busan International Film Festival, with Vikram in attendance.

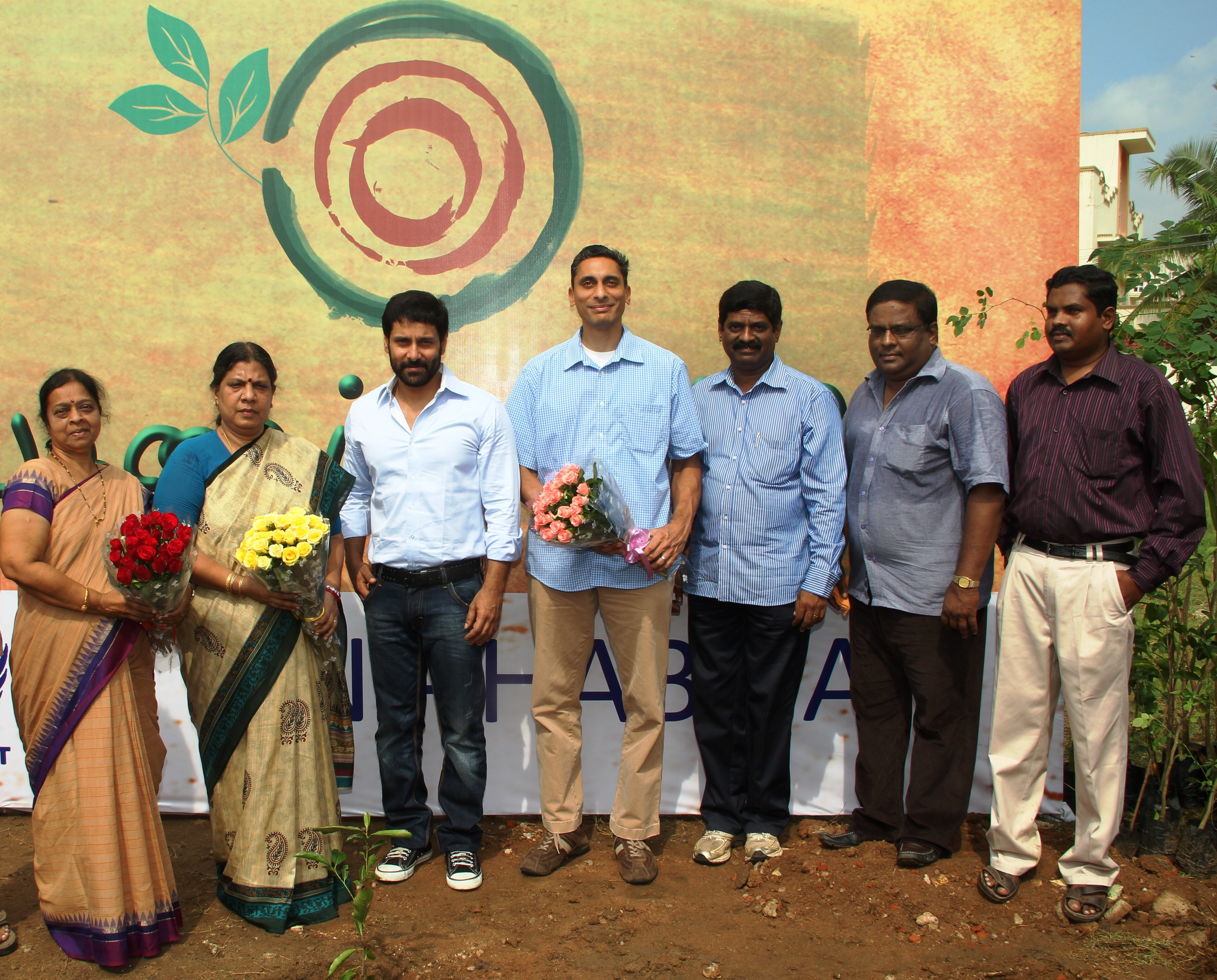
Vikram at UN Habitat program with Information Officer Anand Krishna

After two years of discussions, Vikram began a film under the direction of Selvaraghavan in a project dubbed by the media as Sindubad. The film began shoot and completed a schedule by early 2010 in the Himalayas with Swati Reddy appearing as the female lead. However, the film was reported to be momentarily shelved and subsequently never took off again after the producer Singanamala Ramesh walked out. Vikram then agreed terms to feature in Vikram Kumar's 24, produced by Mohan Natarajan, with Ileana D'Cruz signed on to play the female lead role. The film progressed briefly with shots being canned in caves, before the director was ousted from the project, cancelling the film. Vikram then also shot briefly for a third successive shelved project directed by Boopathy Pandian for the same producer, featuring him in the role of an investigative cop; however the film failed to progress and instead Natarajan financed Vikram's next film.

His 2011 release, the melodrama Deiva Thirumagal, directed by A. L. Vijay, saw Vikram portray a father with a developmental disability having the mental maturity of a seven-year-old. To prepare for the role, Vikram visited homes for the mentally challenged such as Vidya Sagar and Vidya Sudha for a month, watching their body language and taking notes. He also communicated with the patients, to pick up the nuances of people with impaired speech. Vikram has since gone on to describe his role as Krishna as the best character he has ever portrayed. The film, which also featured Sara Arjun, Anushka Shetty and Amala Paul in supporting roles, opened to predominantly positive reviews from critics and enjoyed commercial success at the box office. The reviewer from The Deccan Chronicle described that the film was "Vikram's show all the way" and that "his rendition of a mentally-challenged man trying to cope with the everyday realities of raising a child is a work of art", praising his "fiery, complex performance as one of the more viciously honest depictions of mental illness cinema has seen". Similarly, another critic described that the on-screen chemistry between Vikram and his daughter, played by Sara Arjun, is "magic" and their performances "are sure to leave a lump in your throat". The critic from The Hindu praised the film and Vikram's performance, but analysed that "a problem arises only when you stop looking at Krishna as a character, and begin to see him as Vikram, the hero" and that Vikram should have "underplayed a little here and there and it would have worked better". For his performance in the film, Vikram won his first Filmfare Critics Award for Best Actor – Tamil, in addition to his seventh nomination for the Filmfare Award for Best Actor – Tamil.

Vikram next featured in Rajapattai (2011), alongside Deeksha Seth, under the direction of Suseenthiran, where he played a henchman trying to get a break in the Tamil film industry. The film opened to mixed reviews from critics in December 2011 and performed below expectations at the box office. Vikram also completed half of a fantasy period film during 2011, Karikalan, in which he played Karikala Chola, a Tamil king who ruled in 270 BC, opposite Zarine Khan, under the direction of graphics director Kannan, but the film was later shelved owing to production troubles. He then appeared in his second project with director Vijay, portraying the lead role of a blinded RAW agent in the action-thriller, Thaandavam. The film, which also featured Anushka Shetty, Amy Jackson and Lakshmi Rai in pivotal roles, opened to mixed reviews in September 2012. For his role of a blind man, Vikram trained under noted human echolocation specialist Daniel Kish, with the latter also playing a cameo in the film. A critic from Sify.com noted that it was "Vikram and him alone who diverts your attention from the film's little logical script flaws and spellbinds you with an endearing act that is Thaandavam's biggest strength"; subsequently, the film did average business commercially. For his performance in the film, Vikram received his eighth nomination for the Filmfare Award for Best Actor – Tamil. The actor was next seen portraying the title role in Bejoy Nambiar's Hindi-language film David playing out a love story between a careless drunkard fisherman and a mute girl played by Isha Sherwani. The film won mixed reviews and performed average business at the box office. The film was also partially reshot in Tamil in the same title for which Vikram was one of the producers.

=== 2015–2019: Limited releases and major productions ===
Vikram signed on to collaborate again with Shankar for I, a romantic thriller opposite Amy Jackson, in early 2012. Following hushed production developments, it was revealed that the actor would sport four significantly different looks in the film: a body builder, a beast, a model and a hunchback. He put on weight to portray the bodybuilder, sticking to a diet of protein and coffee, to ensure his muscles were defined on screen. Vikram subsequently lost weight to portray a model, before shaving his head and reducing his weight to 56 kilograms to portray the crippled hunchback. He changed his physique by eating small meals of egg whites and apples instead of regular food intake, while engaging in an intensive weight loss regimen to become thin. The cast and crew of the film reportedly struggled to recognise the actor at times, while he also stayed away from the media for close to a year when sporting the look. Taking almost three years for production, Vikram described the film "as the toughest he has ever done" and regularly suffered folliculitis as a result of the prosthetic make-up he had to wear. The film opened amidst much expectation in January 2015 to mixed reviews, though Vikram's portrayal of Lingesan received highly positive reviews. A critic from The Times of India noted: "Vikram bowls you over with a heart-wrenching performance whether he is handsome or disfigured", while The Hindu added his transformation was "laudable", and that "Vikram wins hearts as the earnest-to-boot gym rat and as the strapping new model on the block, he floors the audience with his performance as Koonan, the deformed hunchback". Similarly, Rediff.com noted the actor "is truly impressive and deserves much applause", while Sify.com added he "lived the role". Despite the mixed critical reception, I performed well at the box office, as well as becoming the most successful Tamil film of all time in Kerala. By early 2015, it was the sixth highest-grossing Tamil film of all time at the time. I won Vikram his fifth Filmfare Award for Best Actor – Tamil.

He then worked on Vijay Milton's road-thriller, 10 Enradhukulla (2015), which featured him as an unnamed race driver who goes on a road trip through India. Paired opposite Samantha, the film opened to mixed reviews and did not perform well at the box office. A critic from Sify.com however, noted that Vikram "breathes life to his role and his energy level is highly infectious", adding that "the way he smiles, dances and fights is a treat for his fans". Likewise, a critic from The Hindu criticised the film's script, adding that "it's hard to see Vikram in this fluff".

Vikram later appeared in Iru Mugan (2016), a science fiction action film directed by Anand Shankar, featuring him alongside Nayanthara and Nithya Menen. The film was a critical and commercial success, and earned him his tenth nomination for the Filmfare Award for Best Actor – Tamil. His next films are Sketch (2018), Saamy Square (2018) and Kadaram Kondan (2019).

=== 2022–present: Contemporary career ===
In 2022, Vikram appeared in Kartik Subbaraj's Mahaan as Gandhi Mahaan, along with his son Dhruv Vikram. Though made for theatre release, during the Covid pandemic the producer Lalit Kumar released it straight to OTT in early 2022 in Amazon Prime Video. Later, the producer regretted the decision when the film became popular with the audience and even actors from the film fraternity said it should have been released theatrically.

His next film was with R. Ajay Gnanamuthu and was titled as Cobra (2022). The film received pre-release hype, but it was released to negative reviews from critics.

Vikram played Aditya Karikalan in Mani Ratnam's film Ponniyin Selvan, which released in late 2022. It is the first Tamil film to release in IMAX format. The film earned fantastic reviews and 450-500 crores at the box office becoming the highest grossing Tamil film of 2022.

In Ponniyin Selvan 2 Vikram reprised the role of Aditya Karikalan achieving cult status for his intense and emotional portrayal as the Chola prince winning him the Best Actor at Filmfare, SIIMA and IIFA awards. Sowmya Rajendran of The News Minute noted "A fantastic Vikram makes PS-2 a worthy sequel" The film was a huge success at the box office collecting over 345 crores.

Vikram's next film Thangalaan directed by Pa. Ranjith was released in 2024. The directorial cut of Thangalaan was selected to the Limelight Section at the 54th International Film Festival of Rotterdam 2025. According to national award winning critic and festival curator Meenakshi Shedde - "Chiyaan Vikram is mesmerizing as Thangalaan and gives his all to the role. The fact that IFFR, is showcasing it, months after its theatrical release in August 2024 and streaming on Netflix, is a testimony to its enduring value."

Vikram's much awaited Veera Dheera Sooran a rustic action thriller, directed by S. U. Arun Kumar, released to very positive reviews on 27th March 2025 and is lauded with bringing back 'Vintage Chiyaan'

== Other work ==
=== Film and television work ===
Apart from acting, Vikram has also been a part of other film-making processes with credits as a playback singer and as an assistant director. In 2000, Vikram and actress Meena launched a pop album titled Kadhalism, which the pair would sing and appear in music videos for, although the project was completed without much promotion. Following the success of Bharadwaj's music for Vikram's 2002 film Gemini, Vikram sang a version of the hit song "O Podu!" for the extended version of the album. During the making of Kanthaswamy in 2009, the music composer Devi Sri Prasad had asked Vikram to sing a few rough tracks during the film's song composition in Malaysia. The producers were impressed with his voice and Vikram ended up singing four songs in the film. Furthermore, Vikram also recorded all four tracks in the Telugu version of the album titled Mallana. He then went on to sing for a film he was unrelated to, by lending five different voices in "Meghame" for G. V. Prakash Kumar's album in Madrasapattinam. He sang two further songs under Prakash Kumar for his Deiva Thirumagal, singing in the voice of his character, an adult with the maturity of a six-year-old. In 2011, he sang the song "Laddu Laddu" for his film Rajapattai, under composer Yuvan Shankar Raja's direction. Vikram announced his own production company Reel Life Entertainment in July 2009 and announced that Sasikumar would direct his first film, the action thriller Easan, featuring Samudrakani, Vaibhav, Abhinaya and Aparnaa Bajpai. However, after 90% of the shoot had been completed, Vikram pulled out of the venture, citing that Sasikumar had overshot his budget and the director eventually bought and released the film. The actor, however, was later listed as one of the three producers for the Tamil version of the 2013 film, David, thereby making his debut in film financing. Vikram has also worked as the assistant director under Shafi in Majaa, and has mentioned that he would like to direct a film in the future.

=== Philanthropy ===
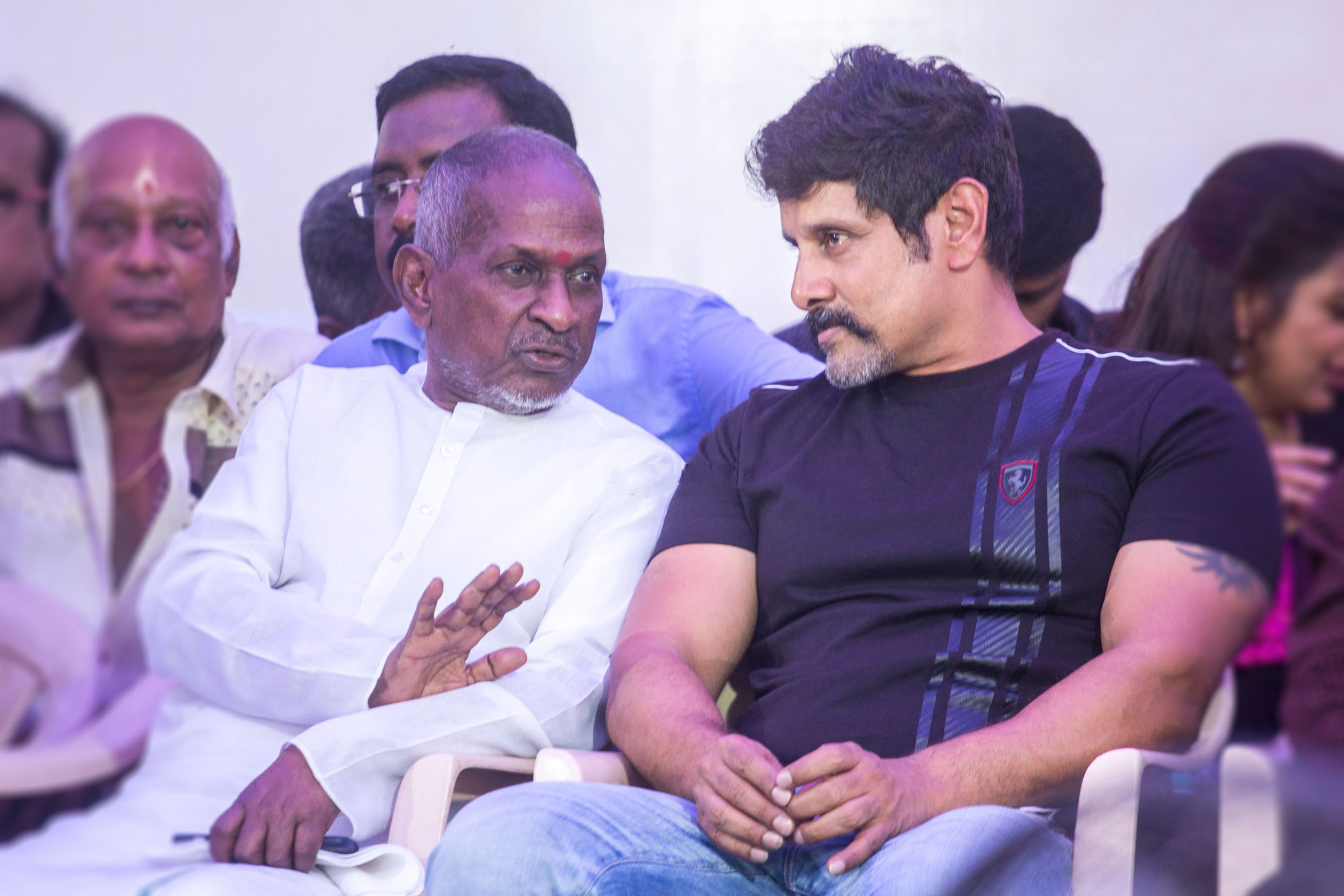
Vikram with Illayaraja at the 2018 Nadigar Sangam protest

Vikram has promoted various social causes with several of his charity works being linked to characters he had portrayed in his films. He has been a brand ambassador of Sanjeevani Trust and a school for special children Vidya Sudha, where he stayed during the making of Deiva Thirumagal. Moreover, he has had a long-term association since the making of his film Kasi with the Kasi Eye Care, which does free eye surgeries for the poor. Vikram has also set up The Vikram Foundation through his fan club to provide heart operations for the poor, educate poor children and rehabilitate victims from natural disasters. Every year, Vikram has celebrated his birthday doing charity work across Tamil Nadu and in 2008, he organised a camp where a thousand of his fans pledged their eyes in an eye donation appeal.

He has lent his support for the Chennai-based charity The Banyan, and appeared in the charity musical Netru, Indru, Naalai directed by Mani Ratnam for the cause. The actor also starred in the 2010 "Mile Sur Mera Tumhara" music video on national integration alongside a bevy of Indian actors and musicians, describing the experience as "phenomenal". In 2011, Vikram was selected as a Youth Envoy for the United Nations Human Settlements Programme with his aim being to spread awareness about the statutes of U.N. Habitat which include urban stabilisation and to help formulate plans for effective water management, slum eradication and women and youth empowerment. Soon after, he announced two further social projects, "Karka Kasadara" and "Patchai Puratchi", with the former being to identify school and college dropouts and help them to stand on their own feet, while the latter was about planting trees with an aim to make Chennai go green. In 2016, he produced and directed the video to the flood relief anthem Spirit of Chennai, as a tribute to the city's volunteers following the 2015 South Indian floods.

== In the media ==
Vikram is a prolific method actor, being often compared akin to Hollywood's Christian Bale. Since the success of Sethu, Vikram's intense performances and variety of roles have received critical acclaim. His performances as a rogue turned mentally ill patient in Sethu, a gravedigger with autism spectrum disorder in Bala's Pithamagan, a Brahmin lawyer with multiple personality disorder in Anniyan and a mentally challenged adult with the maturity of a six-year-old boy in Deiva Thirumagal are all roles in which he played a mentally affected man, with Vikram mentioning that he does such roles to reinvent himself on screen.

Furthermore, Vikram has enjoyed a fan following in Andhra Pradesh as a result of a series of successful dubbed Telugu films with Aparichitudu, dubbed from his Tamil film Anniyan, being among the most successful Telugu films of 2005. All his films are thus released in Telugu soon after their original release in Tamil, while Anniyan was also dubbed in Hindi as Aparichit. He has also enjoyed success in Kerala, where his films have demanded large box office openings akin to Malayalam film stars. In 2004, Vikram participated in a live stadium stage event organised by producer P. L. Thenappan titled "Vikram Mega Nite". The event, held in Singapore, attracted several hundreds of his South East Asian fans and was held in the form of a stage musical. Vikram's pan-Indian popularity has also prompted him to be regularly considered for brand endorsements. In 2005, he was signed as Coca-Cola's brand ambassador in Tamil Nadu. He has been the ambassador for Brooke Bond 3 Roses, Manappuram General Finance and Leasing Ltd and Josco Jewellers since 2010. In 2015, Vikram has endorsed Big Deal TV, a celebrity-driven home shopping channel.

He is amongst the most decorated actors in terms of awards in the history of Tamil cinema. He holds a National Film Award for Best Actor; a feat only matched by five other actors in Tamil films. Moreover, Vikram holds seven Filmfare Awards South, with the tally being only second to Kamal Haasan who has ten wins. In 2010 his film Raavan was promoted at the Cannes Film Festival and then screened at Venice Film Festival and the Busan International Film Festival. Within weeks of release, Deiva Thirumagal was sent to the Asia Pacific Screen Awards after it was nominated by the Film Federation of India and the National Film Development Corporation. Vikram is also a recipient of the Kalaimamani Award from the Government of Tamil Nadu in 2004. Other recognitions includes a string of Cinema Express Awards, Vijay Awards and Tamil Nadu State Film Awards, including recognition in three different categories. In 2011, the media widely reported that Vikram was awarded an honorary doctorate from Università Popolare degli Studi di Milano (People's University of Milan) in the field of Fine Arts. In his next release, Deiva Thirumagal, he was credited as Dr. Chiyaan Vikram. However, the Università Popolare degli Studi di Milano is an unaccredited diploma mill, with no official recognition as a university.

== Personal life ==
Vikram met Shailaja Balakrishnan in the late 1980s, She is a Malayali from Kannur, Kerala and married her in 1992 at Guruvayoor Temple in a mass wedding alongside dozens of couples. The pair then had a low-key wedding ceremony conducted at the church at Loyola College, Chennai. She hails from Thalassery, Kerala and now works as a psychology teacher at a leading Chennai school. Shailaja also worked with the team of Deiva Thirumagal by giving professional advice on how people with special needs are treated and helping develop the character played by Vikram.

The couple has a daughter Akshita born in 1993 and a son Dhruv born in 1995. His daughter made her debut in the television series Chinna Chinna Aasai – Elakiya. She married Manu Ranjith, the great-grandson of M. Karunanidhi, on 30 October 2017. He lives near the beach in Besant Nagar, Chennai and has stated that he would remain based in Chennai regardless of any offers in other language films.

Dhruv made his debut with Adithya Varma in 2019, the Tamil remake of the Telugu film Arjun Reddy.

== Discography ==
Title	Year	Language	Song(s)	Composer	Co-singer(s)	Ref.
Sri	2002	Tamil	"Yaamirukka Bayamein"	T. S. Muralidharan	Shankar Mahadevan, Tippu	
Gemini	2002	Tamil	"O Podu"	Bharadwaj	Anuradha Sriram	
Kanthaswamy / Mallanna	2009	Tamil / Telugu	"Excuse Me" "Ithellam Dupe" / "Ivannee Dupe" "Mambo Mamiya" "Meow Meow"	Devi Sri Prasad	Suchitra; Devi Sri Prasad; Rita; Priya Himesh	
Madrasapattinam	2010	Tamil	"Meghame O Meghame"	G. V. Prakash Kumar	M. S. Viswanathan, Nassar	
Deiva Thirumagal / Nanna	2011	Tamil / Telugu	"Kadha Solla Poren" / "Kadha Cheputhane" "Pa Pa Pappa"	G. V. Prakash Kumar	Shringa S. Solo	
Rajapattai / Veedinthe	2011	Tamil / Telugu	"Laddu Laddu"	Yuvan Shankar Raja	Suchitra, Priyadarshini	
David	2013	Tamil	"Maria Pitache"	Remo Fernandes	Remo Fernandes	
Sketch	2018	Tamil	"Kannave Kannave"	S. Thaman	S. Thaman	
Saamy Square	2018	Tamil	"Pudhu Metro Rail"	Devi Sri Prasad	Keerthy Suresh	
Kadaram Kondan	2019	Tamil	"Theesudar Kuniyuma"	Ghibran	–	
Thangalaan	2024	Tamil	"Aruvadai"	G. V. Prakash Kumar	Sinduri Vishal, Mathichiyam Bala, Suganthi	
