= Filmfare Award for Best Actor – Tamil =

Indian annual film award

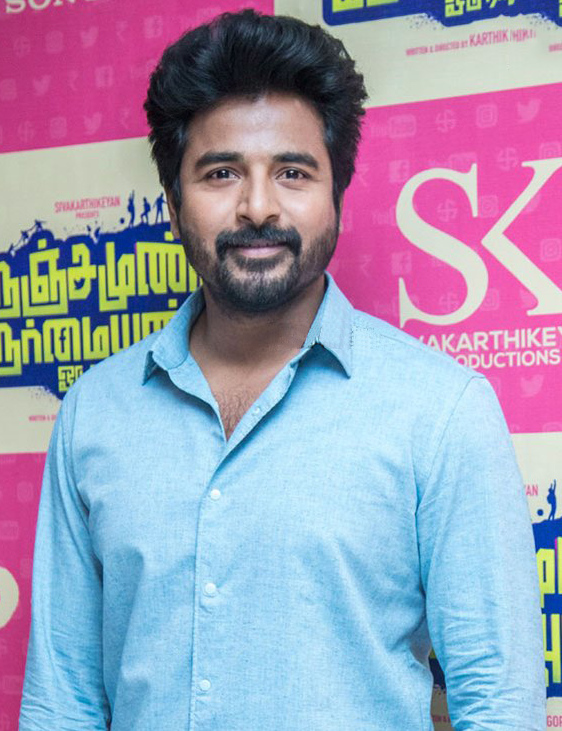
- The 2024 recipient: Sivakarthikeyan
- Awarded for: Best Performance by an Actor in a Leading Role – Tamil
- Country: India
- Presented by: Filmfare
- First award: Sivaji Ganesan for Gnana Oli (1972)
- Currently held by: Sivakarthikeyan for Amaran (2024)
- Website: http://filmfareawards.indiatimes.com/

The Filmfare Award for Best Actor – Tamil is given by the Filmfare as part of its annual Filmfare Awards South for Tamil film lead actors. The Filmfare Awards South Awards were extended to "Best Actor" in 1972.

== Superlatives ==
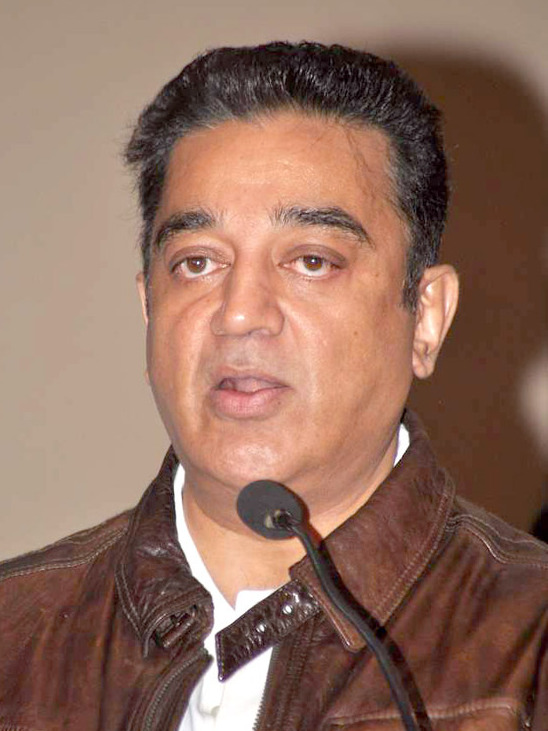
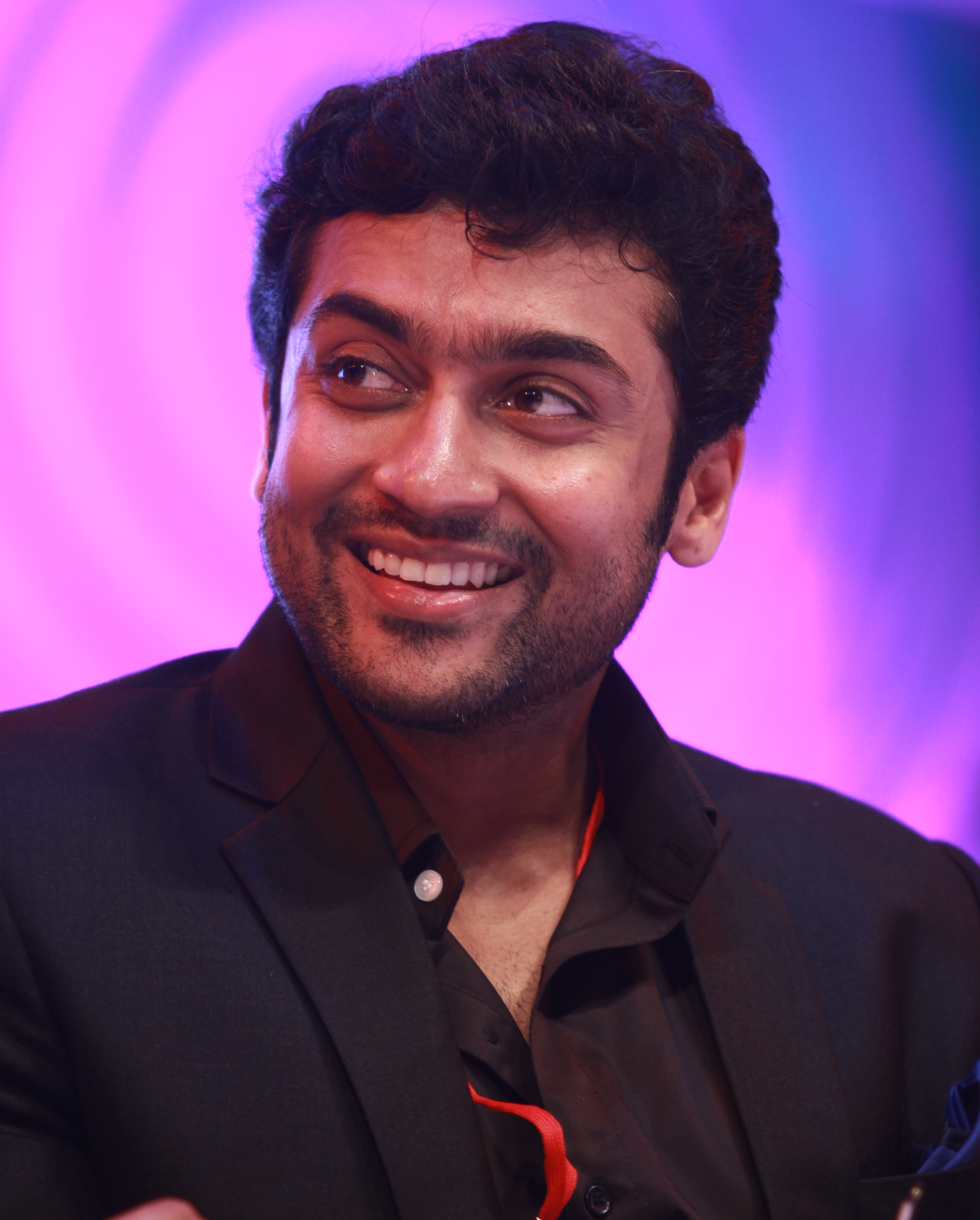
Kamal Haasan (top) has the record of 11 wins and most nominations with 35 in this category and Suriya (bottom) has 14 Nominations and has won the award three times.

Superlative	Actor	Record
Actor with most wins	Kamal Haasan	11 wins
Actor with most nominations	Kamal Haasan	35 nominations
Actor with most consecutive nominations	Kamal Haasan (1985–1996)	12 nominations
Oldest winner	Kamal Haasan	68
Oldest nominee	Rajinikanth	73
Youngest winner	Kamal Haasan	21
Youngest nominee	Dhanush and Kamal Haasan	21
Actor with most consecutive wins	Kamal Haasan	4 wins (1975–1978)
Actor with most nominations without a win	Vijay	8 nominations

- Kamal Haasan with eleven wins, has most number of awards than any other actor. Vikram has six wins, followed by Karthik and Dhanush with four wins. Four actors have won the award thrice in chronological order. They are Sivaji Ganesan, Sarath Kumar, Ajith Kumar and Suriya. Actors Sivakumar and Vijay Sethupathi has two wins each.
- Vikram, Dhanush, Karthi, Suriya and R. Madhavan are the five actors to win both Filmfare Award for Best Actor – Tamil and Filmfare Critics Award for Best Actor and Vikram is the first actor to win this honour.
- Sathyaraj, Suriya and R. Madhavan, Karthi have won both Filmfare Award for Best Actor – Tamil and Filmfare Award for Best Supporting Actor – Tamil.
- Kamal Haasan was the most victorious actor with four wins in the 70s. Karthik ruled the 80s with two wins. In the 90s, Kamal Haasan outperformed every other actors with four wins. Vikram was the most successful actor with three wins in the 2000s. Dhanush was the most successful actor in the 2010s with four wins.
- Seven actors have won the awards in consecutive years; in chronological order, they are Sivaji Ganesan (1972–1973), Kamal Haasan (1975–1978, 1991–1992 and 1995–1996), Sivakumar (1979–1980), Karthik (1988–1990), Sarathkumar (1997–1998), Dhanush (2011–2012) and Vijay Sethupathi (2017–2018).
- Suriya, R. Madhavan and Karthi are the three actors to have won Filmfare Awards South in three major actor categories : Best Actor, Best Supporting Actor, Best Actor Critics which was achieved by them as of 2016 & 2017 & 2024 respectively.
- R. Madhavan became the first actor and the only actor to have won Filmfare Awards South in four different acting categories: Best Actor, Best Supporting Actor, Best Actor critics and Best Male Debut awards once each.
- There was only one tie in 2018 between Dhanush and Vijay Sethupathi.
- Karthi was the only actor to win the award for his debut performance in Tamil.
- Kamal Haasan has the most nominations with 35, followed by Rajinikanth with 18.
- Suriya and Karthi are the only siblings to be awarded in this category.

== Multiple wins ==
- 11 wins: Kamal Haasan
- 6 wins: Vikram
- 4 wins: Karthik, Dhanush
- 3 wins: Sivaji Ganesan, Sarath Kumar, Ajith Kumar, Suriya
- 2 wins: Sivakumar, Vijay Sethupathi

== Multiple nominations ==
Multiple nominations :

- 35 nominations: Kamal Haasan
- 18 nominations: Rajinikanth
- 14 nominations: Suriya
- 12 nominations: Dhanush
- 11 nominations: Vikram
- 10 nominations: Sivaji Ganesan, Ajith Kumar
- 8 nominations: Vijay Sethupathi, Vijay
- 6 nominations: Sivakumar, K. Bhagyaraj, Vijayakanth, Karthik
- 5 nominations: Mohan, Karthi
- 4 nominations: M. G. Ramachandran, Sathyaraj, Prabhu, Madhavan, Jayam Ravi, Sarath Kumar, Arvind Swami
- 3 nominations: Arya, Silambarasan
- 2 nominations: Siddharth, Jiiva, Prakash Raj, Arjun Sarja, Vijayakumar, Sudhakar, Prithviraj Sukumaran, Narain, Sivakarthikeyan

== Winners ==
This is the complete list of the award winners and the films for which they won. The year indicates the year of release of the film.

Year	Actor	Role	Film	Ref
1972	Sivaji Ganesan	Anthony	Gnana Oli	
1973	Sivaji Ganesan	• Rajinikanth • Kannan	Gauravam	
1974	Gemini Ganesan	David Ashirvadham	Naan Avanillai	
1975	Kamal Haasan	Prasanna	Apoorva Raagangal	
1976	Kamal Haasan	Ravi	Oru Oodhappu Kan Simittugiradhu	
1977	Kamal Haasan	Gopalakrishnan	16 Vayadhinile	
1978	Kamal Haasan	Muthu / Dileep	Sigappu Rojakal	
1979	Sivakumar	Sempattai	Rosaappo Ravikkai Kaari	
1980	Sivakumar	Gaja	Vandichakkaram	
1981	Kamal Haasan	Raghu	Raja Paarvai	
1982	Mohan	Ravi Kumar	Payanangal Mudivathillai	
1983	K. Bhagyaraj	Shanmugamani	Mundhanai Mudichu	
1984	Rajinikanth	Manikkam	Nallavanukku Nallavan	
1985	Sivaji Ganesan	Malaichami	Muthal Mariyathai	
1986	Vijayakanth	Chinnamani	Amman Kovil Kizhakale	
1987	Sathyaraj	Balu Thevar	Vedham Pudhithu	
1988	Karthik	Ashok	Agni Natchathiram	
1989	Karthik	Kannan	Varusham Padhinaaru	
1990	Karthik	Ponnurangam	Kizhakku Vasal	
1991	Kamal Haasan	Gunasekharan	Guna	
1992	Kamal Haasan	Sakthivelu Thevar	Thevar Magan	
1993	Karthik	Ponnumani	Ponnumani	
1994	R. Sarathkumar	• Shanmugam • Pasupathi	Nattamai	
1995	Kamal Haasan	Adhi Narayanan	Kuruthipunal	
1996	Kamal Haasan	• Senapathy • Chandrabose	Indian	
1997	R. Sarathkumar	• Sakthivel Gounder • Chinnarasu	Suryavamsam	
1998	R. Sarathkumar	• Chinnayya • Muthaiyya	Natpukkaga	
1999	Ajith Kumar	• Deva • Shiva	Vaalee	
2000	Kamal Haasan	Saket Raman Iyengar	Hey Ram	
2001	Vikram	Kasi	Kasi	
2002	Ajith Kumar	• Shiva • Vishnu	Villain	
2003	Vikram	Chithan	Pithamagan	
2004	Suriya	• Chinna • Karthik	Perazhagan	
2005	Vikram	Ramanujam / Remo / Anniyan	Anniyan	
2006	Ajith Kumar	• Shivashankar • Vishnu • Jeeva	Varalaaru	
2007	Karthi	Paruthiveeran	Paruthiveeran	
2008	Suriya	• Krishnan • Suriya Krishnan	Vaaranam Aayiram	
2009	Prakash Raj	Vengadam	Kanchivaram	
2010	Vikram	Veeraiya	Raavanan	
2011	Dhanush	K. P. Karuppu	Aadukalam	
2012	Dhanush	Raam	3	
2013	Atharvaa	Raasa	Paradesi	
2014	Dhanush	Raghuvaran	Velaiilla Pattadhari	
2015	Vikram	Lingesan	I	
2016	R. Madhavan	Prabhu Selvaraj	Irudhi Suttru	
2017	Vijay Sethupathi	Vedha	Vikram Vedha	
2018	Dhanush	Anbu	Vada Chennai	
2018	Vijay Sethupathi	Ram	'96	
2019	AWARDS FUNCTION WAS SUSPENDED DUE TO COVID-19 PANDEMIC			
2020–2021	Suriya	Nedumaaran Rajangam	Soorarai Pottru	
2022	Kamal Haasan	Agent Arun Kumar/Vikram	Vikram	
2023	Vikram	Aditha Karikalan	Ponniyin Selvan: II	
2024	Sivakarthikeyan	Major Mukund Varadharajan	Amaran	

== Nominations ==
=== 1970s ===
- 1972 Sivaji Ganesan – Gnana Oli
- 1973 Sivaji Ganesan – Gauravam
- 1974 Gemini Ganesan – Naan Avan Illai
  - M. G. Ramachandran – Urimai Kural
  - Sivaji Ganesan – Thanga Pathakkam
- 1975 Kamal Haasan – Apoorva Raagangal
  - M. G. Ramachandran – Idhayakkani
  - Sivaji Ganesan – Vaira Nenjam
- 1976 Kamal Haasan – Oru Oodhappu Kan Simittugiradhu
  - Jaishankar – Thunive Thunai
  - M. G. Ramachandran – Needhikku Thalaivanangu
  - Sivaji Ganesan – Chitra Pournami
  - Sivakumar – Annakili
- 1977 Kamal Haasan – 16 Vayathinile
  - Kamal Haasan – Avargal
  - M. G. Ramachandran – Navarathinam
  - Sivaji Ganesan – Dheepam
  - Sivakumar – Aattukara Alamelu
- 1978 Kamal Haasan – Sigappu Rojakkal
  - Kamal Haasan – Ilamai Oonjal Aadukirathu
  - Rajinikanth – Mullum Malarum
  - Sivaji Ganesan – Thyagam
  - Sudhakar – Kizhakke Pogum Rail
- 1979 Sivakumar – Rosappu Ravikkaikari
  - Kamal Haasan – Ninaithale Inikkum
  - Pratap Pothen – Azhiyatha Kolangal
  - Rajinikanth – Aarilirunthu Arubathu Varai
  - Vijayan – Uthiri Pookkal

=== 1980s ===
- 1980 Sivakumar – Vandichakkaram
  - Kamal Haasan – Varumayin Niram Sigappu
  - Pratap Pothen – Nenjathai Killathe
  - Rajinikanth – Johnny
  - Sudhakar – Kallukkul Eeram
- 1981 Kamal Haasan – Raja Paarvai
  - Sivaji Ganesan - Kalthoon
  - Sivaji Ganesan - Keezh Vaanam Sivakkum
- 1982 Mohan – Payanangal Mudivathillai
  - Kamal Haasan – Moondram Pirai
  - Kamal Haasan – Vaazhve Mayam
  - Rajinikanth – Moondru Mugam
  - Sivakumar – Agni Sakshi
- 1983 Bhagyaraj – Mundhanai Mudichu
  - Pandiyan – Mann Vasanai
  - Sivaji Ganesan – Imaigal
  - T. Rajendar – Thangaikkor Geetham
  - Thiagarajan – Malaiyoor Mambattiyan
- 1984 Rajinikanth – Nallavanukku Nallavan
  - Mohan – Nooravathu Naal
  - Rajesh – Achamillai Achamillai
  - Sivaji Ganesan – Vaazhkai
  - Vijayakanth – Vaidehi Kathirunthal
- 1985 Sivaji Ganesan – Muthal Mariyathai
  - Bhagyaraj – Chinna Veedu
  - Kamal Haasan – Oru Kaidhiyin Diary
  - Mohan – Idaya Kovil
  - Sivakumar – Sindhu Bhairavi
- 1986 Vijayakanth – Amman Kovil Kizhakale
  - Kamal Haasan – Punnagai Mannan
  - Mohan – Mouna Ragam
  - Prabhu – Aruvadai Naal
  - Visu – Samsaram Adhu Minsaram
- 1987 Sathyaraj – Vedham Pudhithu
  - Bhagyaraj – Enga Chinna Rasa
  - Kamal Haasan – Nayakan
  - Mohan – Rettai Vaal Kuruvi
  - Rajinikanth – Velaikaran
- 1988 Karthik – Agni Natchathiram
  - Kamal Haasan – Unnal Mudiyum Thambi
  - Prabhu – Agni Natchathiram
  - Sathyaraj – En Bommukutty Ammavukku
  - Vijayakanth – Poonthotta Kaavalkaaran
- 1989 Karthik – Varusham Padhinaaru
  - Bhagyaraj – Aararo Aariraro
  - Kamal Haasan – Apoorva Sagodharargal
  - Rahman – Pudhu Pudhu Arthangal
  - Ramarajan – Karakattakkaran

=== 1990s ===
- 1990 Karthik – Kizhakku Vaasal
  - Kamal Haasan – Michael Madana Kama Rajan
  - Rajinikanth – Panakkaran
  - Sathyaraj – Nadigan
  - Vijayakanth – Pulan Visaranai
- 1991 Kamal Haasan – Gunaa
  - Mammootty – Azhagan
  - Murali – Idhayam
  - Prabhu – Chinna Thambi
  - Rajinikanth – Thalapathi
- 1992 Kamal Haasan – Thevar Magan
  - Arvind Swami – Roja
  - Bhagyaraj – Raasukutti
  - Rajinikanth – Annaamalai
  - Vijayakanth – Chinna Gounder
- 1993 Karthik – Ponnumani
  - Arjun Sarja – Gentleman
  - Kamal Haasan – Kalaignan
  - Rajinikanth – Uzhaippali
  - Vijayakumar – Kizhakku Cheemayile
- 1994 R. Sarathkumar – Nattamai
  - Kamal Haasan – Mahanadhi
  - Prabhu Deva – Kaadhalan
  - Prabhu – Duet
  - Vijayakanth – Honest Raj
- 1995 Kamal Haasan – Kuruthipunal
  - Ajith Kumar – Aasai
  - Arvind Swami – Bombay
  - Rajinikanth – Baashha
  - Rajinikanth – Muthu
- 1996 Kamal Haasan – Indian
  - Ajith Kumar – Kadhal Kottai
  - Vijayakumar – Anthimanthaarai
  - Kamal Haasan - Avvai Shanmugi
- 1997 R. Sarathkumar – Suryavamsam
  - Prakash Raj – Iruvar
  - R. Parthiban – Bharathi Kannamma
  - Rajinikanth – Arunachalam
  - Vijay – Kadhalukku Mariyadhai
- 1998 R. Sarathkumar – Natpukkaga
  - Karthik – Unnidathil Ennai Koduthen
  - Prashanth – Jeans
- 1999 Ajith Kumar – Vaalee
  - Ajith Kumar – Amarkkalam
  - Arjun Sarja – Mudhalvan
  - Rajinikanth – Padayappa
  - Vikram – Sethu

=== 2000s ===
- 2000 Kamal Haasan – Hey Ram
  - Ajith Kumar – Mugavaree
  - Madhavan – Alaipayuthey
  - Prashanth – Parthen Rasithen
  - Sayaji Shinde – Bharathi
- 2001 Vikram – Kasi
  - Ajith Kumar – Citizen
  - Ajith Kumar – Poovellam Un Vasam
  - Kamal Haasan – Aalavandhan
  - Suriya – Nandhaa
- 2002 Ajith Kumar – Villain
  - Kamal Haasan – Panchatanthiram
  - Madhavan – Kannathil Muthamittal
  - Suriya – Mounam Pesiyadhe
- 2003 Vikram – Pithamagan
  - Dhanush – Kadhal Kondein
  - Kamal Haasan – Anbe Sivam
  - Suriya – Kaakha Kaakha
- 2004 Suriya – Perazhagan
  - Kamal Haasan – Vasool Raja MBBS
  - Silambarasan – Manmadhan
  - Vijay – Ghilli
- 2005 Vikram – Anniyan
  - Jiiva – Raam
  - Sarath Kumar – Ayya
  - Suriya – Ghajini
- 2006 Ajith Kumar – Varalaru
  - Dhanush – Pudhupettai
  - Kamal Haasan – Vettaiyaadu Vilaiyaadu
  - Narain – Chithiram Pesuthadi
- 2007 Karthi – Paruthiveeran
  - Ajith Kumar – Billa
  - Rajinikanth – Sivaji
  - Sathyaraj – Onbathu Roopai Notu
  - Vijay – Pokkiri
- 2008 Suriya – Vaaranam Aayiram
  - Dhanush – Yaaradi Nee Mohini
  - Jayam Ravi – Santosh Subramaniam
  - Kamal Haasan – Dasavathaaram
  - Narain – Anjathe
- 2009 Prakash Raj – Kanchivaram
  - Arya – Naan Kadavul
  - Jayam Ravi – Peraanmai
  - Kamal Haasan – Unnaipol Oruvan
  - Suriya – Ayan

=== 2010s ===
- 2010 – Vikram – Raavanan
  - Arya – Madrasapattinam
  - Karthi – Aayirathil Oruvan
  - Karthi – Paiyaa
  - Rajinikanth – Enthiran
  - Silambarasan – Vinnaithaandi Varuvaayaa
  - Suriya – Singam
- 2011 – Dhanush – Aadukalam
  - Ajith Kumar – Mankatha
  - Jiiva – Ko
  - Suriya – 7 Aum Arivu
  - Vikram – Deiva Thirumagal
- 2012 – Dhanush – 3
  - Suriya – Maattrraan
  - Vijay – Thuppakki
  - Vijay Sethupathi – Pizza
  - Vikram – Thandavam
- 2013 – Atharvaa – Paradesi
  - Ajith Kumar – Arrambam
  - Dhanush – Maryan
  - Kamal Haasan – Vishwaroopam
  - Kishore – Haridas
  - Suriya – Singam 2
- 2014 – Dhanush – Velaiilla Pattadhari
  - Ajith Kumar – Veeram
  - Karthi – Madras
  - Prithviraj Sukumaran – Kaaviya Thalaivan
  - Vijay – Kaththi
- 2015 – Vikram – I
  - Ajith Kumar – Yennai Arindhaal
  - Dhanush – Anegan
  - Jayam Ravi – Thani Oruvan
  - Kamal Haasan – Papanasam
- 2016 – Madhavan – Irudhi Suttru
  - Dhanush – Kodi
  - Rajinikanth – Kabali
  - Suriya – 24
  - Vijay – Theri
  - Vikram – Iru Mugan
- 2017 – Vijay Sethupathi – Vikram Vedha
  - Karthi – Theeran Adhigaaram Ondru / Thozha
  - Madhavan – Vikram Vedha
  - Rajkiran – Power Paandi
  - Vijay – Mersal
- 2018 – Dhanush – Vada Chennai and Vijay Sethupathi – 96 (tie)
  - Arvind Swami – Chekka Chivantha Vaanam
  - Jayam Ravi – Adanga Maru
  - Vijay – Sarkar

=== 2020s ===
- 2020–2021 – Suriya – Soorarai Pottru
  - Arvind Swami – Thalaivi
  - Arya – Sarpatta Parambarai
  - Ashok Selvan – Oh My Kadavule
  - Dhanush – Karnan
  - Dulquer Salman – Kannum Kannum Kollaiyadithaal
  - K. Manikandan – Jai Bhim
  - Suriya – Jai Bhim
- 2022 – Kamal Haasan – Vikram
  - Dhanush – Thiruchitrambalam
  - Jayam Ravi – Ponniyin Selvan: I
  - Karthi – Ponniyin Selvan: I
  - Vikram – Ponniyin Selvan: I
  - Silambarasan – Vendhu Thanindhathu Kaadu
  - R. Madhavan – Rocketry: The Nambi Effect
  - R. Parthiban – Iravin Nizhal
- 2023 – Vikram – Ponniyin Selvan: II
  - Siddharth – Chithha
  - Vadivelu – Maamannan
  - Sivakarthikeyan – Maaveeran
  - Soori – Viduthalai Part 1
- 2024 – Sivakarthikeyan – Amaran
  - Arvind Swami – Meiyazhagan
  - Attakathi Dinesh – Lubber Pandhu
  - Dhanush – Captain Miller
  - Soori – Garudan
  - Vikram – Thangalaan
  - Vijay Sethupathi – Maharaja
