= Bhagyaraj =

Bhagyaraj is a surname. Notable people with the surname include:

- K. Bhagyaraj (born 1953), Indian film director
- Poornima Bhagyaraj, Indian actress
- Praveena Bhagyaraj (died 1983), Indian actress
- Shanthanu Bhagyaraj (born 1986), Indian actor
