= Iru Mugan =

2016 film by Anand Shankar

- Theatrical release poster
- Directed by: Anand Shankar
- Written by: Anand Shankar
- Produced by: Shibu Thameens
- Starring: Vikram; Nayanthara; Nithya Menen
- Cinematography: R. D. Rajasekhar
- Edited by: Bhuvan Srinivasan
- Music by: Harris Jayaraj
- Production company: Thameens Films
- Distributed by: Auraa Cinemas
- Release date: 8 September 2016
- Running time: 154 minutes
- Country: India
- Language: Tamil
- Budget: ₹40 crore
- Box office: ₹95 crore

Iru Mugan (transl. Two-Faced Man) is a 2016 Indian Tamil-language science fiction action thriller film directed by Anand Shankar and produced by Shibu Thameens under the banner Thameens Films. The film stars Vikram in a dual roles as hero and villain, alongside Nayanthara, Nithya Menen, Nassar, Thambi Ramaiah and Karunakaran in supporting roles. In the film, an ex-R&AW agent sets out to track down a scientist, who has created a hazardous drug that can boost adrenaline levels.

Principal photography commenced in December 2015. The major portion of the film was shot in Malaysia with few sequences in Chennai, Bangkok, Ladakh and Kashmir. Harris Jayaraj composed the soundtrack and musical score, while R. D. Rajasekhar and Bhuvan Srinivasan handled the cinematography and editing respectively.

Iru Mugan was released on 8 September 2016 to positive reviews from critics and was a commercial success at the box office.

== Plot ==
An elderly Malaysian man goes berserk and kills several Indian officers in a span of five minutes at the Indian Embassy in Kuala Lumpur before collapsing to death. A tattooed love symbol on the back of his neck leads the R&AW agency to conclude that it is the handiwork of a rogue Genderfluid scientist named Love, whose identity and whereabouts are unknown to anyone except their retired agent Akilan Vinod. Four years ago, while on an assignment to bust Love, Akilan's wife Meera George was killed by them. A R&AW operative, Malik, tracks down Akilan and convinces him to join the investigation.

On viewing the video footage of the attack, Akilan concludes that the Malaysian man had taken a mysterious performance-enhancing drug which allowed him to attack the Indian officials, and decides to investigate the matter further in Malaysia. Since Akilan is under suspension, Malik assigns him as a deputy to Ayushi, a junior R&AW agent, and the two leave for Kuala Lumpur. In Kuala Lumpur, Akilan and Ayushi learn that the mysterious drug is inhaled using an asthma inhaler. Further investigations lead them to Peter, a scientist on Love's payroll.

Peter becomes an informer and tells them about the drug called Speed. The drug causes a person who inhales it to have extraordinary strength for five minutes before falling unconscious. If the person inhales the drug again within a few hours, they will suffer a massive heart attack. Peter also reveals that a shipment of Speed inhalers is to be dispatched to Love within the next 15 minutes. Akilan and Ayushi pursue the lorry carrying the inhalers, but a lorry driver inhales Speed and subdues the duo, and they are then taken to Love's hideout. Akilan goes to arrest Love but is knocked out by Meera, who is still alive and has been working for Love as a computer hacker by the name ROSY.

It is then revealed that Meera suffers from retrograde amnesia after being attacked four years ago and that Love took advantage of her situation to employ her as a computer hacker to create an impenetrable firewall. However, when Love orders Meera to kill Akilan and Ayushi, she points the gun at Love and calls the police, who arrest him. Meera reveals that she had been forced to take Speed by Love to work faster, but the drug caused her to regain old memories, including those with Akilan. Meera soon regained her full memory after continuous use of the drug. She eventually reconciles with Akilan. While in custody, Love manages to obtain a Speed inhaler and inhales it, helping her escape and destroy the entire police station, killing Ayushi and everyone present. Ayushi had recorded the whole incident by using a bluetooth camera.

Akilan finds out that Love had made a satellite call to Chang, the Transport Minister of Malaysia, who had allowed Love to send shipments of Speed inhalers to India to perpetrate terror attacks there in return for money. Akilan rushes to the hospital where Chang is admitted and interrogates him. During the interrogation, Love sneaks into the hospital and, hiding in the air conditioning vent, sprays a neurotoxic gas in Chang's room, causing Akilan and Chang to get paralyzed. Love then kills Chang and puts the knife in Akilan's hand, framing him as Chang's assassin. Akilan and Meera are declared fugitives, but the duo manages to escape from the Malaysian police.

Akilan and Meera decide to finish off Love with her kill switch activation device, which Ayushi restored and hid before she was killed. As the device can only be opened with Love's fingerprint, they plan on obtaining her fingerprint. They sneak into an illegal airfield owned by Chang, where Love plans to leave for India with the shipments of Speed inhalers. Akilan inhales Speed and fights Love, who has also inhaled Speed, and manages to get her fingerprint before collapsing after the drug effect wears off.

On regaining consciousness, Akilan finds out that Love has already left for India. It is shown that Akilan used silica gel to get Love's fingerprints. Akilan then uses the fingerprints to open the kill switch activation device, deactivates the kill switch, and kills all of Love's henchmen, including those piloting the plane. The plane crashes into a remote jungle, killing Love and destroying the Speed shipments. A few weeks later, Akilan and Meera are enjoying a holiday cruise on a private boat, sponsored by the Government of Malaysia, as a reward for killing Love. It is revealed that Akilan had secretly kept a Speed inhaler.

== Cast ==
- Vikram in a dual role as
  - Akilan Vinod
  - Love
- Nayanthara as Meera George (Rosy)
- Nithya Menen as Ayushi
- Nassar as Malik
- Thambi Ramaiah as Muthaiah
- Karunakaran as Peter
- Riythvika as Kidnapped Girl
- Jasper as Billy Murali
- Karthik Nag as Balaji
- Balaji Venugopal as Manish

== Production ==
=== Development ===
Director Anand Shankar and Vikram were first announced to be collaborating in October 2014, with producer S. Thanu financing the venture. Vikram was incredulous after watching Anand Shankar's directorial debut, Arima Nambi (2014), and invited him to write a story for him. A month later, Anand Shankar brought Vikram a script. Vikram revealed that, in addition to the subject matter, the character development was also a reason he accepted the project.

=== Casting ===
Kajal Aggarwal and Priya Anand were signed on to portray the lead actresses. The project was titled as Marma Manithan. However, production disputes took place during June 2015 after Ayngaran International also announced their interest in producing the film, with Thanu attempting to hand over the rights of the film. Priya Anand also opted out of the film, with Bindu Madhavi announced as her replacement. The ongoing changes subsequently stopped the team from beginning their shoot in Malaysia during July 2015, and the production was stalled. The delays meant that Vikram stopped waiting for the makers to begin work, changed his specially-prepared facial hair and went back to add finishing touches to his other ongoing project, 10 Endrathukulla (2015).

Ayngaran International backed out of the film in November 2015, prompting Anand Shankar to re-approach different producers to find new funding for the project. Later on in the month, Shibu Thameens agreed to produce the film and announced that the film would finally begin its first schedule in Malaysia during December 2015. The change of producer also meant significant changes were made to the cast and crew of the film, with Kajal Aggarwal dropped for Nayanthara. Bindu Madhavi was left out of the new team, while the makers discussed the secondary lead role with actresses Nithya Menen and Parvathy Thiruvothu, before Menen was selected. Likewise, R. D. Rajasekhar and Suresh Selvarajan were brought on board to handle the film's cinematography and art direction, respectively.

=== Crew ===
Harris Jayaraj was also subsequently confirmed as the film's music composer, and marked a return to signing films after taking a brief sabbatical. Actress Kalyani Priyadarshan worked as a production designer for the film.

=== Filming ===
The film was launched in December 2015, and it was revealed that the film would be shot in Chennai, Ladakh, Bangkok and Malaysia. The project was also retitled as Iru Mugan and a first look poster was released in early January 2016. In early 2016, the team shot two schedules in Malaysia and then in Chennai, before Anand Shankar headed to Kashmir to scout for further locations. A third schedule was completed in Chennai during March 2016. Filming wrapped in mid-July 2016.

== Music ==
Iru Mugan

Soundtrack album by Harris Jayaraj
- Released: 2 August 2016
- Recorded: 2015–2016
- Genre: Feature film soundtrack
- Length: 22:13
- Label: Sony Music
- Producer: Harris Jayaraj

Harris Jayaraj chronology
Gethu (2016)	Iru Mugan (2016)	S3 (2016)
External audio
- Official Audio Jukebox on YouTube

Harris Jayaraj composed the film's soundtrack and score, in which the film, marks his sixth collaboration with Vikram. The lyrics for the songs were written by Madhan Karky, Thamarai and Kavithai Gunder Emcee Jesz. The song "Halena", takes inspiration from the 2014 song "Trap Queen" performed by American rapper Fetty Wap. The recording process for the songs were completed within July 2016. Sony Music acquired the audio rights of the film. The full album was released on 2 August 2016 at a launch event held at Sathyam Cinemas, Chennai.

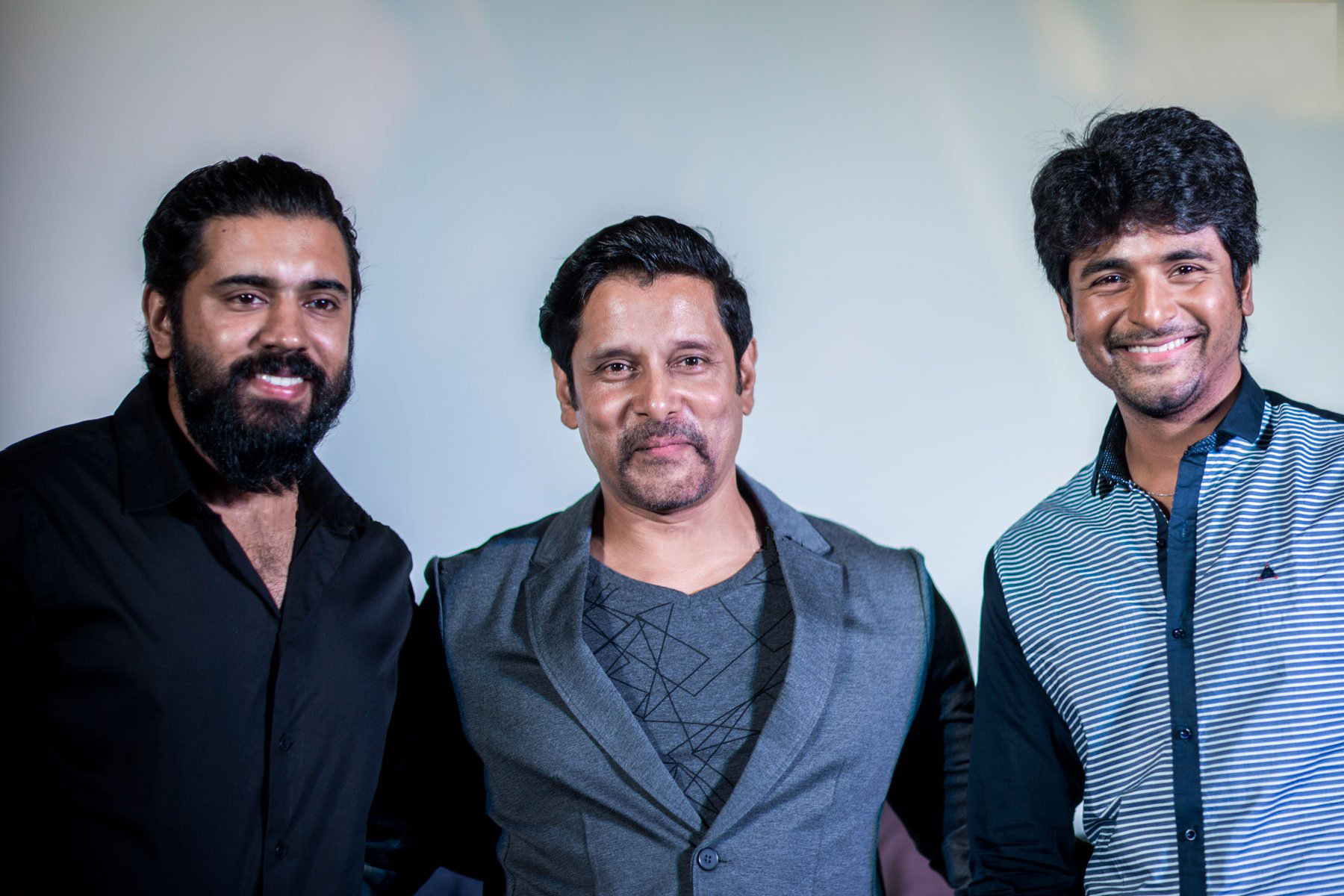
Vikram with Sivakarthikeyan and Nivin Pauly at Iru Mugan Audio Launch.

Sify rated the album 4.25/5 reviewing that "This is vintage Harris delivering a mellifluous album!" The Times of India rated 2.5/5, stating "Except for two songs, Harris doesn't really make an impact with this album."

Track listing
No.	Title	Lyrics	Singer(s)	Length
1.	"Halena"	Madhan Karky	Abhay Jodhpurkar, Ujjayinee Roy, Christopher Stanley	4:48
2.	"Oh Maya"	Thamarai	N. C. Karunya, Ramya NSK	5:03
3.	"Kannai Vittu"	Madhan Karky	Tippu, Srimathumitha, Praveen Saivi	6:02
4.	"Irumugan Settai"	Kavithai Gundar Emcee Jesz	Kavithai Gunder Emcee Jesz, Steeve Vatz, Maalavika Manoj	4:05
5.	"Face off (Theme)"	—	Maria Roe Vincent	2:14
Total length:				22:13

== Release ==
=== Theatrical ===
Iru Mugan was initially slated to release on 1 September 2016, coinciding with Ganesh Chathurthi festival, but was pushed to 8 September 2016. The film did not release in Karnataka due to the bandh called by Karnataka Rakshana Vedike and also decided not to release any Tamil films on the state because of the Kaveri River water dispute, which also affected several other Tamil films such as Thodari, Remo, Rekka and Devi as the films did not have a theatrical release in Karnataka.

=== Home media ===
Zee Network bought the satellite rights of the film's Tamil and Hindi version, while the Telugu version were sold to Disney Star.

== Reception ==
=== Critical response ===
M Suganth of The Times of India gave 3/5 stars and wrote "If Anand Shankar's previous film Arima Nambi had echoes of K. Bhagyaraj's Rudhra, the set-up of Iru Mugan recalls that of Kamal Haasan's Vikram." Sowmya S of Hindustan Times gave 3/5 stars and wrote "Iru Mugan is not free from commercial cliches but it still is a fun ride as a fast-paced thriller laced with chemistry and history lessons on drugs."

Srivatsan of India Today gave 2.5/5 stars and wrote "Iru Mugan could've easily been Tamil cinema's answer to Hollywood thrillers but it's neither a damn-good film or a bad one." Anupama Subramanian of Deccan Chronicle wrote "Although formulaic in nature, Iru Mugan is a straightforward drug-infused thriller that is high on tempo and very unrelenting." Sreedhar Pillai wrote for Firstpost, "Iru Mugan is a one-time stylish and racy entertainer and an out and out Vikram show, which has its moments."

=== Accolades ===
- 64th Filmfare Awards South
  - Best Actor – Tamil - Vikram (Nominated)
  - Best Actress – Tamil - Nayanthara (Nominated)
  - Best Music Director – Tamil - Harris Jayaraj (Nominated)
- 6th South Indian International Movie Awards
  - Best Actor – Tamil - Vikram (Nominated)
  - Best Actress – Tamil - Nayanthara (Won)
  - Best Music Director Tamil - Harris Jayaraj (Nominated)
