= Kasi (film) =

2001 film by Vinayan

- Promotional poster
- Directed by: Vinayan
- Written by: Gokula Krishnan (dialogues)
- Story by: Vinayan
- Based on: Vasanthiyum Lakshmiyum Pinne Njaanum (Malayalam)
- Produced by: Aroma Mani
- Starring: Vikram; Kaveri; Kavya Madhavan
- Cinematography: P. Sukumar
- Edited by: G. Murali
- Music by: Ilaiyaraaja
- Distributed by: Sunitha Productions
- Release date: 14 November 2001
- Running time: 138 minutes
- Country: India
- Language: Tamil

Kasi is a 2001 Indian Tamil-language drama film written and directed by Vinayan. A remake of the director's Malayalam film Vasanthiyum Lakshmiyum Pinne Njaanum (1999), it has Vikram playing the eponymous character of a blind village singer, while Kaveri (reprising her role from the original) and Kavya Madhavan (in her Tamil debut) play key roles. The film was produced by Aroma Mani for Sunitha Productions. The music was composed by Ilaiyaraaja.

The film was released on 14 November 2001, and became a commercial success. For his performance, Vikram won the Filmfare Best Actor Award and Cinema Express Award for Best Actor – Tamil.

== Plot ==
Kasi is a blind poet and talented singer who supports his family with his songs. He lives in a village in Tanjore district and has a drunkard older brother Sevalai; an abusive, crippled father Valaiyapathy; and a younger sister Lakshmi. When the local landlord and former MP Raghupathi returns to the district, he promises to help the locals. Raghupathi is known as a god in the area for his charitable work. When a specialist eye doctor arrives, he promises to pay the operation fees to restore Kasi's vision. Elated by the news, Kasi learns he must find an eye donor. His lover Kaveri, who cannot speak, offers one of her eyes. Weeks later, he receives Dinesh, the son of a powerful union minister, and his wife Radhika. Unfortunately, turns out that the "god-like" Raghupathi and Dinesh are not what they seem. Blissfully unaware of the sadness of those around him, Kasi looks forward to his operation. One morning, on the day of the operation, Lakshmi was found dead. It is revealed that she committed suicide because of Raghupathi. When Raghupathi comes to attend the funeral, Kasi explains to Raghupathi what the latter did while choking him to death.

== Cast ==
- Vikram as Kasi
- Kaveri as Kaveri
- Kavya Madhavan as Lakshmi
  - Sanusha as younger Lakshmi
- Manivannan as Irulaandi
- Vinu Chakravarthy as Valaiyapathy
- Rajeev as Raghupathi
- Chandrasekhar
- Charle as Sodala
- Thalaivasal Vijay as Sevvalai
- Shyam Ganesh
- Vishnuprasad
- Balaji as Gopal
- Suchitra Murali as Valli
- Vadivukkarasi as Muniyamma
- Aishwarya as Radhika
- Manka Mahesh
- Karthika as Salesgirl (cameo)
- KR Rangamma as Ponnathaa (uncredited)

== Production ==
Malayalam actress Kavya Madhavan made her debut in Tamil film industry with the character named Lakshmi after being impressed by its original Malayalam version, which was done by actress Praveena. The shooting was completed in just 45 days. While preparing to play a blind singer, Vikram practised drawing his eyeballs up into their sockets so that only the whites could be seen. Once the shoot started, he would roll his eyeballs up through the whole day on the set, and would subsequently do eye exercises at the end of the day's shoot so that he would not end up with a squint. His eyesight was later weakened as a result of his work on the film. To achieve a darker skin tone, he sunbathed on the terrace of his beachside home in Chennai for a sunburnt look.

== Soundtrack ==
The soundtrack album was composed by Ilaiyaraaja. All the songs have been sung by Hariharan.

Track listing
No.	Title	Lyrics	Singer(s)	Length
1.	"Aathorathile Aalamaram"	Pulamaipithan	Hariharan	5:11
2.	"En Mana Vaanil"	Mu. Metha	Hariharan	5:39
3.	"Maanu Tholu"	Pulamaipithan	Hariharan	5:07
4.	"Naan Kaanum Ulagangal"	Mu. Metha	Hariharan	4:33
5.	"Punniyam Thedi Kasikku"	Palani Bharathi	Hariharan	4:53
6.	"Rokkam Irukura Makkal"	Mu. Metha	Hariharan, Sujatha	4:59
Total length:				30:22

== Release and reception ==
The Hindu's Malathi Rangarajan applauded the offbeat attempt stating, "A film without predictable ingredients is a rarity. The Kasi team has to be appreciated for its boldness, in telling a story, in a simple, straight forward manner without the evitable distractions". While Vikram's portrayal was appreciated, "As a blind man, with his eyeballs completely in and with facial twitches so typical of the visually impaired, his portrait is realistic", the two lead actress too received acclaim, "Kavya Madhavan and Kaveri, have excellently expressive eyes, which have been put to good use". S. R. Ashok Kumar, also from The Hindu, said, "As the blind Kasi, he touched a chord". Sify noted, "Vikram, it goes without saying that he is the life and soul of Kasi. As the blind singer, he brings laughter, tears and a lump in one’s throat. Vikram has given an extraordinarily detailed performance, which only a Kamalhassan can do!" and summed up saying it's an emotionally powerful movie. Cinesouth wrote "In the circumstances prevailing in current times, one cannot expect a better film in quality than Kasi. Also, one cannot hope to see better acting performance also in other films. One stands to gain when he chances to see Kasi immediately. It would be nice to Tamil film world also. For goods, films should not be omitted to be seen as they are very rare to come by". Visual Dasan of Kalki praised the performance of Vikram, Ilaiyaraaja's music, Gokula Krishnan's dialogues and unpredictable ending but panned the director for adding melodrama in Tamil when he handled the original in a subtle way. Kasi was commercially successful as well.

== Accolades ==
Award	Ceremony	Category	Nominee(s)	Outcome	Ref.
Filmfare Awards South	49th Filmfare Awards South	Best Actor – Tamil	Vikram	Won	
Filmfare Awards South	49th Filmfare Awards South	Best Film – Tamil	Kasi	Nominated	
Filmfare Awards South	49th Filmfare Awards South	Best Director – Tamil	Vinayan	Nominated	
Filmfare Awards South	49th Filmfare Awards South	Best Music Director – Tamil	Ilaiyaraaja	Nominated	
Cinema Express Awards	22nd Cinema Express Awards	Best Actor – Tamil	Vikram	Won	

== In other media ==
The song "Punniyam Thedi Kasikku" was parodied by Kalabhavan Mani (who played the main protagonist in the original film) in the 2002 film Gemini, in which film he plays the main antagonist, while Vikram plays the titular role (Gemini).
