= Pithamagan =

2003 film directed by Bala

- Film poster
- Directed by: Bala
- Written by: Bala
- Produced by: V. A. Durai
- Starring: Vikram; Suriya; Laila; Sangeetha; Ramaraju
- Cinematography: Balasubrahmannyam
- Edited by: Suresh Urs
- Music by: Ilaiyaraaja
- Production company: Evergreen Movie International
- Release date: 24 October 2003
- Running time: 158 minutes
- Country: India
- Language: Tamil

Pithamagan (transl. Son of Ancestors) is a 2003 Indian Tamil-language action crime drama film written and directed by Bala. The film stars Vikram, Suriya, Laila and Sangeetha in the lead roles, with Karunaas, Manobala and Ramaraju (credited as Mahadevan) in supporting roles. In the film, a man raised in a graveyard with no understanding of the world forms a bond with a con artist.

Pithamagan was released on 24 October 2003. The film became a success and Vikram won numerous accolades for his performance, including the National Film Award for Best Actor in a Leading Role. It was remade in Kannada as Anatharu (2007).

== Plot ==
In Bodinayakkanur, an anonymous woman dies while giving birth in a graveyard. Her child, Chithan, is found and raised by the caretaker of the graveyard. Chithan grows up among corpses with minimal human contact and displays feral traits, but seems to understand loyalty and does not understand social clues. He ventures into a town in search of food after his caretaker dies and gets into trouble as he does not understand the concept of money. He is rescued by Gomathi, a petty marijuana dealer. She sees his ability to be loyal and enrolls him into the service of her employer Sekar Vasudevan, a large scale marijuana grower. Chithan is caught during a drug raid and arrested.

Sakthi is a con artist. He gets into trouble when he cons a woman named Manju into losing all her personal effects in a game of dice. Sakthi gets sent to jail thanks to Manju's detective work. He meets Chithan in prison and starts protecting him out of sympathy and pity. Chithan starts to reciprocate to Sakthi's kindness with blind loyalty.

Sakthi serves his term and then clashes with Sekar to get Chithan released from jail. Chithan gets out but commits a crime when he obeys his master Sekar's instruction to burn the body of a victim whom Sekar personally killed. Sakthi, realising that Chithan is being used as accessory in crimes that he cannot comprehend, prevents Chithan from going back to working in the marijuana fields. At the same time, a budding romance starts between Sakthi and Manju, and Chithan too starts to see a shared spirit in Gomathi.

The police catches wind of the murder and arrests Chithan. Sakthi gets Chithan to side with the police as an informant. Sekar's men later attack Sakthi and Sekar kills him by repeatedly hitting him with a spanner and has his body dumped in the middle of the road. Chithan is unable to understand that Sakthi is dead and zones out when everyone surrounds him. While Gomathi, Manju, and the others are crying, Gomathi sees Chithan's confusion as indifference and angrily drives him away from Sakthi's body.

Chithan slowly starts to understand that Sakthi is dead as he sees him on the funeral pyre. His realisation is complete when he wakes up in the morning next to the burnt remains of Sakthi's corpse. He experiences emotions that he has never experienced before: fury, agony, betrayal, and pain that he has never felt, and decides to take revenge on Sekar. Chithan sets fire to the marijuana fields, lets Sekar experience the pain of his loss, and then sets upon destroying him physically. He drives him through the street after killing his henchmen, taking his time by breaking a few bones at a time until he is done toying with him. He then kills Sekar by biting his neck, and with nothing left to lose, leaves the village after a distressed Gomathi tries to make him stay.

== Cast ==
Opening credits

- Vikram as Chithan
- Suriya as Sakthivel alias Sakthi
- Laila as Manju
- Sangeetha as Gomathi
- Karunaas as Karuvaayan
- Manobala as Sakthi's uncle

Closing credits

- Simran as herself (special appearance)
- T. P. Gajendran as a director
- Mu Ramaswamy as Chithan's caretaker
- Visweswara Rao as Manju's father
- Muthukaalai as Sekar's assistant
- Rajan as Mathivathanan
- Mahadevan as Sekar Vasudevan
- Sivagangai Karuppu as Ganja Kudukki

== Production ==
After Nandhaa (2001), Bala announced his next project Pithamagan with Vikram and Suriya, the main lead actors of his previous films who received popularity after struggle. For Gomathy's role, Bala selected Rasika P. Mani after considering Vijayashanti, Malavika and Gayatri Jayaraman and also changed her name back to Sangeetha. Telugu actor Ramaraju (rechristened as Mahadevan) and Ganja Karuppu (credited as Sivagangai Karuppu) made their Tamil debut with this film. Most of the film was shot in Theni district. The action sequenced were choreographed by Stun Siva and assisted by Rajendran.

== Music ==
The soundtrack was composed by Ilaiyaraaja. The song "Piraiye Piraiye" is set in Pantuvarali raga. R. Rangaraj of Chennai Online wrote, "The maestro has not failed his fans. Although the music is not of the racy, peppy variety, it is bound to do well due to the different approach in terms of mood and tone. It is not often that one has to compose songs to be shot on a Vettiyan [undertaker]. Like a Phoenix rishing from the ashes, Ilayaraja too rises to the occasion".

Tamil track listing
No.	Title	Lyrics	Singer(s)	Length
1.	"Adadaa Aghangaara Arakka Kaigalil"	Mu. Metha	K. J. Yesudas	04:38
2.	"Aruna Runaam"	Alangudi Somu, Ku. Ma. Balasubramaniam, A. Maruthakasi, Kannadasan, Arunagirinathar	T. M. Soundararajan, P. Susheela	06:39
3.	"Elangaathu Veesudhey"	Palani Bharathi	Sriram Parthasarathy, Shreya Ghoshal	06:10
4.	"Elangaathu Veesudhey" (solo)	Palani Bharathi	Sriram Parthasarathy	06:10
5.	"Kodi Yethi Vaippom"	Na. Muthukumar	Bhavatharini, Shanmugasundari, Periya Karuppa Thevar, Harish Raghavendra	04:08
6.	"Piraiye Piraiye"	Vaali	Madhu Balakrishnan	04:41
7.	"Yaaradhu Yaaradhu"	Na. Muthukumar	Ilaiyaraaja
Total length:				32:26

All lyrics are written by Vanamali.

Telugu track listing
No.	Title	Singer(s)	Length
1.	"Adhigo Avineethi"	Vijay Yesudas	04:39
2.	"Priyathama Ninne"	Inumula Shobhan, Madhulata Jannu	03:20
3.	"Chirugaali Veechene"	Sunitha, R. P. Patnaik	06:12
4.	"Yevaradhi Yevaradhi"	Vijay Yesudas	02:15
5.	"Okate Jananam"	Vijay Yesudas	04:41
Total length:			21:07

== Release and reception ==
Pithamagan was released on 24 October 2003, coinciding with Diwali. Malathi Rangarajan of The Hindu praised Vikram as "Without any dialogue to support him he carves a niche for himself in the viewer's mind with his expressions and excellent body language" and Suriya as "Who would have thought that this young man, pitted against the serious Chithan, would prove so perfect a foil?" going on to declare the film as "..a symphony on celluloid". A reviewer at Sify noted, "..it is the expert performance of the lead actors that elevate the film above the commonplace".

Film critic Baradwaj Rangan remarked, "Bala's ingeniousness is evident everywhere .... And he gets tremendous support from his leads...It all adds up to a first-rate film that excoriates as much as it entertains". Malini Mannath wrote in Chennai Online, "It's an off-beat, sensitive and a serious film, which may lack in commercial ingredients but which a discerning viewer will find a welcome change". Visual Dasan of Kalki praised the performances of lead actors, Bala's direction, also praising Balasubramaniam's cinematography and Ilaiyaraaja's music for working equally hard with director and concluded Pithamagan is not Vikram and Suriya film, it is Bala's unique work.

=== Accolades ===
Award	Date of ceremony (Note: Date is linked to the article about the awards held that year, wherever possible.)	Category	Nominee(s)	Ref.
National Film Awards	2 February 2005	Best Actor in a Leading Role	Vikram	
Tamil Nadu State Film Awards	c. 2006	Best Actor	Vikram	
Tamil Nadu State Film Awards	c. 2006	Best Actress	Laila	
Tamil Nadu State Film Awards	c. 2006	Best Character Artiste (Female)	Sangeetha	
Filmfare Awards South	12 June 2004	Best Film – Tamil	Pithamagan	
Filmfare Awards South	12 June 2004	Best Director – Tamil	Bala	
Filmfare Awards South	12 June 2004	Best Actor – Tamil	Vikram	
Filmfare Awards South	12 June 2004	Best Actress – Tamil	Laila	
Filmfare Awards South	12 June 2004	Best Supporting Actor – Tamil	Suriya	
Filmfare Awards South	12 June 2004	Best Supporting Actress – Tamil	Sangeetha	
CineMAA Awards	5 November 2004	South India's Best Actor	Vikram	

== Other versions ==
Pithamagan was dubbed into Telugu as Siva Putrudu (transl. The son of Shiva) and released on 2 April 2004. The film was remade in Kannada as Anatharu (2007), with Mahedevan reprising his role. In October 2011, it was reported that Satish Kaushik bought the Hindi remake rights. Later, it was reported that he wanted Salman Khan to reprise Vikram's role. However, the project failed to materialise.
