= En Kadhal Kanmani =

- Title card
- Directed by: T. J. Joy
- Written by: T. J. Joy; Madurai Balan (dialogues)
- Produced by: C. Selvaraj
- Starring: Vikram; Rekha Nambiar
- Cinematography: M. M. Rengasamy
- Edited by: R. T. Annadurai
- Music by: L. Vaidyanathan
- Production company: Progressive Cine Arts
- Release date: 17 October 1990
- Running time: 118 minutes
- Country: India
- Language: Tamil

En Kadhal Kanmani (transl. My love, apple of my eye) is a 1990 Indian Tamil-language romance film directed by T. J. Joy, starring Vikram and Rekha Nambiar. This is the debut film for Vikram. It was released on 17 October 1990 and failed at the box office.

== Plot ==
Vinod, a smoking addict, falls in love with Hema. The rest of the story is about how Vinod quits his smoking addiction and marries Hema.

== Cast ==
- Vikram as Vinod
- Rekha Nambiar as Hema
- V. K. Ramasamy as Hema's father
- S. S. Chandran
- Kovai Sarala as Lilly
- Loose Mohan as Mental man
- Gandhimathi as roadside shop owner
- Vennira Aadai Moorthy as Dr. R. Machakaalai
- Ennathe Kannaiah as restaurant worker
- Oru Viral Krishna Rao as Vinod's uncle
- Kallapetti Singaram as bookstore worker
- Sumathi
- Typist Gopu as Ramesh

== Production ==
The film was produced by several employees of Indian Bank, who chose to turn producers for a small-budget experimental film named En Kadhal Kanmani. Vikram was cast in the film after the makers had seen his advertisements and television serial Galatta Kudumbam. This is the debut film for Vikram.

== Soundtrack ==
The soundtrack was composed by L. Vaidyanathan, with lyrics by Vairamuthu.

Track listing
No.	Title	Singer(s)	Length
1.	"Ennai Vittu"	S. P. Balasubrahmanyam, K. S. Chithra
2.	"Gangai Eppodum Kaaiyvathillai"	K. J. Yesudas
3.	"Ennaiya"	S. P. Balasubrahmanyam
4.	"Inru Dhan"	S. P. Balasubrahmanyam, K. S. Chithra
5.	"Ayyakkannu"	K. S. Chithra

== Release ==
En Kadhal Kanmani was released on 17 October 1990, and failed at the box office.
