= C. Rangarajan =

Indian politician and economist

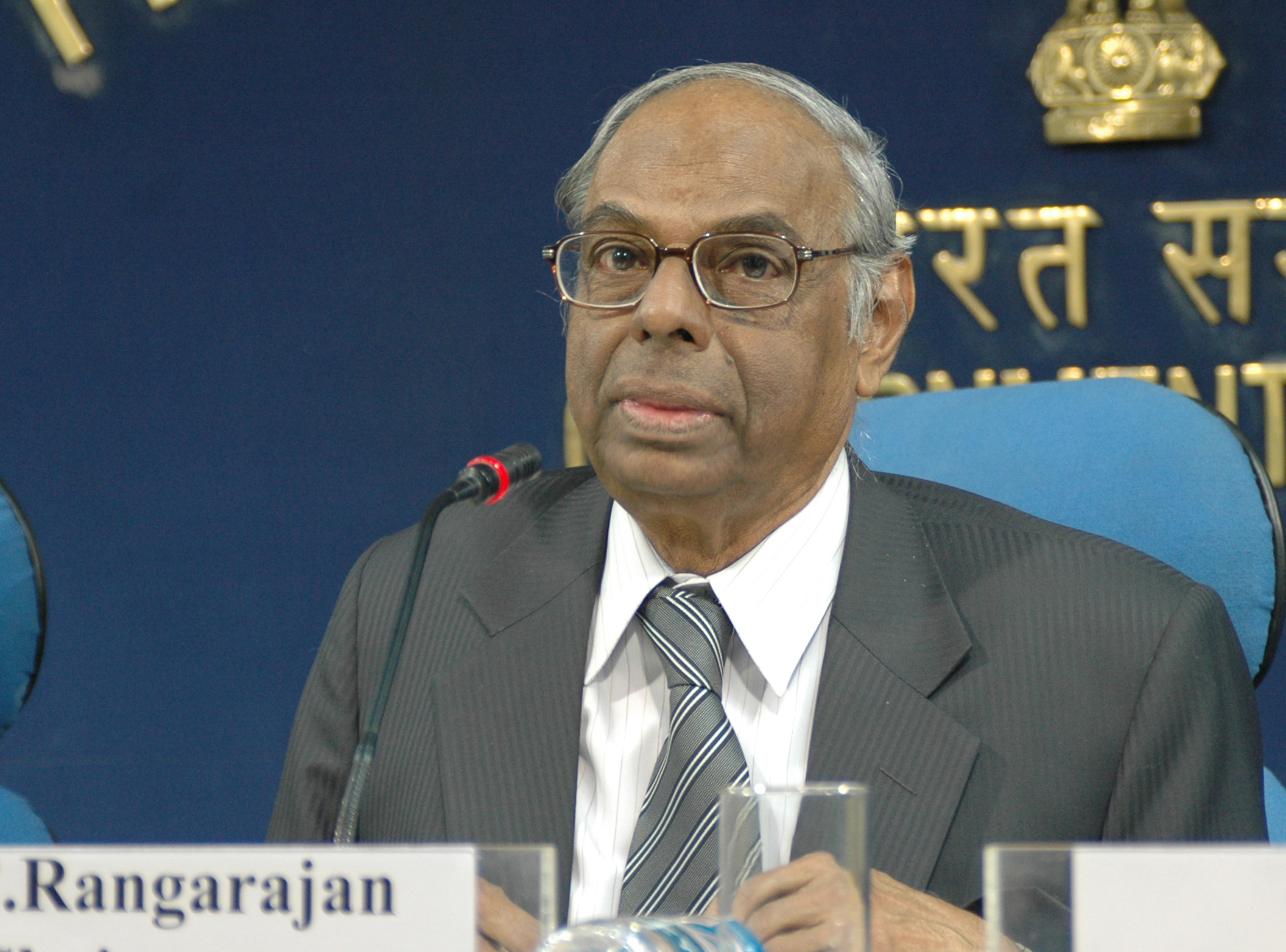

Chairman of the Prime Minister's Economic Advisory Council
- In office August 2009 – 16 May 2014
- Succeeded by: Bibek Debroy
- In office 2005 – 2008
- Preceded by: Suresh Tendulkar

Member of Rajya Sabha
- In office August 2008 – August 2009

Chairman of the Twelfth Finance Commission of India
- In office 2003–2004
- Preceded by: A. M. Khusro
- Succeeded by: Vijay Kelkar

16th Governor of Andhra Pradesh
- In office 24 November 1997 – 3 January 2003
- Preceded by: Krishan Kant
- Succeeded by: Surjit Singh Barnala

19th Governor of Reserve Bank of India
- In office 22 December 1992 – 21 November 1997
- Preceded by: S. Venkitaramanan
- Succeeded by: Bimal Jalan

Member of Planning Commission of Government of India
- In office 21 August 1991 – 21 December 1992

Deputy Governor of Reserve Bank of India
- In office 12 February 1982 – 20 August 1991
- Governor: Manmohan Singh; Amitav Ghosh (banker); R.N. Malhotra; S. Venkitaramanan

Personal details
- Party: Independent
- Education: National College, Trichy; University of Madras (B.A.); University of Pennsylvania (Ph.D.)
- Profession: Economist; Civil servant

Chakravarthi Rangarajan (born 1932) is an Indian economist, a former Member of Parliament and 19th governor of the Reserve Bank of India. He is the former chairman of the Prime Minister's Economic Advisory Council; he resigned the day the UPA lost power. He is also the Chairman of the Madras School of Economics; former president of the Indian Statistical Institute; the founding chairman of the CR Rao Advanced Institute of Mathematics, Statistics and Computer Science; former chancellor of the University of Hyderabad; and a professor in Ahmedabad University.

== Early life ==
Rangarajan, a student of National College (Tiruchirappalli) between 1947 and 1949, graduated from Loyola College of the University of Madras in the commerce stream (where he was a contemporary of the Yale University economics professor T N Srinivasan). He later received his PhD in economics from the University of Pennsylvania in 1964. His thesis was titled "Variability of Demand Deposits. He is a native of Vaduvur, a tiny village near Thanjavur.

== Career ==
Rangarajan taught at several institutions including the University of Pennsylvania and the Indian Institute of Management, Ahmedabad (IIM-A). He was a well known teacher of economics at IIMA for the postgraduate and the doctoral courses. His textbook on macro economics was used in business management schools. He was awarded the title of Honorary Fellow of IIM-A in 1997.

He served as a deputy governor of the Reserve Bank of India from 1982 to 1991, after which he served as the governor of the Reserve Bank of India between 22 December 1992 and 21 December 1997.

He served as the governor of Andhra Pradesh from 24 November 1997 to 3 January 2003. After demitting that office, he took charge as the chairman of the Twelfth Finance Commission. While serving as the governor of Andhra Pradesh, he received additional charges as governor of Odisha from 1998 to 1999, and as governor of Tamil Nadu from 2001 to 2002.

In 2002, the Government of India awarded him the Padma Vibhushan, India's second highest civilian award. Academy of Grassroots Studies and Research of India (AGRASRI), Tirupati, awarded him the Rajiv Gandhi Outstanding Leadership National Award for the year 2008 on 20 August 2008 at Tirupati. He delivered the 7th Rajiv Gandhi Memorial Lecture on 20 August 2008 at Tirupati.

From 2005 to 2008, he was the chairman of the Prime Minister's Economic Advisory Council. In August 2008, he resigned as chairman of the council and was nominated as a member of the Rajya Sabha. He resigned from the Rajya Sabha in August 2009 and was re-appointed chairman of the Prime Minister's Economic Advisory Council. He resigned from the Council on 19 May 2014, when the UPA government was voted out of power. Since then, he has been the chairman of the Madras School of Economics and has been writing and publishing on issues pertaining to the economy.

In May 2020, the Tamil Nadu government formed a high-level committee, chaired by Rangarajan, to advise the government on the medium-term response after the COVID-19 lockdown period. The committee submitted its report in September 2020, recommending an urban jobs guarantee program, similar to the state's rural one, and expressing optimism about the economy's ability to rebound in two months' time.

Preceded by G. Ramanujam	C Rangarajan; Governor of Andhra Pradesh; 24 November 1997 – 3 January 2003	Succeeded by Surjit Singh Barnala
Preceded by K.V. Raghunatha Reddy	Governor of Odisha; Apr 1998– Nov 1999	Succeeded by M. M. Rajendran
