= Yamudu =

2026 Telugu-language crime thriller film

- Directed by: Jagadeesh Amanchi
- Written by: Jagadeesh Amanchi
- Screenplay by: Siva
- Story by: Jagadeesh Amanchi; Hari Allineni
- Produced by: Jagadeesh Amanchi
- Starring: JAGAD (Jagadeesh Amanchi); Sravani Setti; Advika Sharma; Aakash Challa
- Cinematography: Vishnu
- Edited by: Hari
- Music by: Bhavani Rakesh
- Production company: Jagannada Pictures
- Release date: 7 August 2026
- Running time: 122 minutes
- Country: India
- Language: Telugu

Yamudu is a 2026 Indian Telugu-language crime thriller film directed, written and produced by Jagadeesh Amanchi who also acts in the film as JAGAD. The film has Sravani Setti, Advika Sharma and Aakash Challa along with Amanchi. It was released theatrically on 7 August 2026.

This movie is based on a modern-day thriller with certain aspects of Hindu myths which include lord Yamadharma raju and mythological book Garuda Purana. The movie is based on series of killings and it is related to character Yamudu who seems to be posing a challenge to the police investigation.

== Cast ==
- Jagadeesh Amanchi
- Sravani Setti
- Advika Sharma
- Aakash Challa
- Bobby
- Srisha
- Moumika
- Balu
- Balarana
- Durga
- Srinu
- Ramesh

== Music ==
Bhavani Rakesh composed the music for this film . The music was released on the JAGAD Music World label.

Songs in the film:

Song	Singers	Lyrics
Dirty Girl	Robin, Stelia MC	Manoj Juloori
My Best Friend	Pablo Muehle	Vamsi Sarojini Vikas
Krishna Bajare	Pavani Vasa	Vamsi Sarojini Vikas

== Release ==
Yamudu was released theatrically on 7 August 2026 in India.

== Reception ==
The film received mixed reviews from critics.

The Hans India gave the film a rating of 3/5 , describing it as a crime thriller with an interesting mythological twist. The review praised the combination of crime, suspense and mythological elements.

Sakshi Post rated the film 2.75/5 and described Yamudu as a murder mystery with a mythological twist.

NTV Telugu rated the film 2.5/5 and highlighted its combination of crime and mythology, including references to the Garuda Purana. The review also discussed the performances, music, cinematography and screenplay.

Sakshi rated the film 2.5/5 in its review.
