= Madras School of Economics =

Institution of higher education in Chennai, India

Madras School Of Economics (Institute of Special Importance)
- Motto: Mentoring Excellence
- Established: 1993; 33 years ago
- Chairman: C. Rangarajan
- Director: N. R. Bhanumurthy
- Undergraduates: 80
- Postgraduates: 150
- Location: Chennai, Tamil Nadu, India; 13.017112°N 80.237934°E
- Website: http://www.mse.ac.in/

Madras School of Economics (Institute of Special Importance) is an institution of higher education in economics, located in Chennai, India. Madras School of Economics was founded in 1993 as a post-graduate institution for teaching and research in economics. MSE offers a two-year Master's program in General Economics, Financial Economics, Applied Quantitative Finance, Actuarial Economics and Environmental economics affiliated to the Central University of Tamil Nadu, and a Ph.D. programme affiliated to the University of Madras. In April 2018, the AICTE approved Technical Institution started two P. G. Diploma Programs in Financial Engineering and Research & Business Analytics.

MSE has undertaken a large number of research projects since its inception, including the World Bank sponsored Capacity Building Programme in Environmental Economics. The World Bank project involved research, training, curriculum, and overseas fellowship components which were coordinated by MSE. Subsequently, the Ministry of Environment and Forests approved the proposal to set up a Centre of Excellence in Environmental Economics at MSE. MSE has also served as an ENVIS Centre in Environmental Economics under the Environment Information System (ENVIS) of the Ministry of Environment and Forests, Government of India. A dedicated program on Trade and Environment, with support from the Ministry of Environment and Forests, Government of India, has been initiated at MSE. With a very active research unit and well formulated curriculum, it has made its presence felt in both government as well as the corporate sector. With an in-depth subjective knowledge and with the students here have proved themselves within the various sectors they worked in, including consumer and corporate banking, academia, investment banking, analytics, research cells and various government bodies.

It introduced a three-year Bachelor's course in Economics for school pass-outs in 2022.

Owing to the important role the institution has played since its inception, the Tamil Nadu state government decided to recognise the institution as an institute of special importance and enable it to award its own degrees and diplomas. The state government has also decided to help the school set up a centre for public finance to conduct research in public finance. The institution would provide policy suggestions to the government apart from running academic courses.

== Founding members of the school ==
- A. C. Muthiah - Chairman and President, Southern Petrochemicals Industries Corporation Limited Chennai
- A. Sivasailam - Chairman and Managing Director Tractor and Farm Equipments Limited, Chennai
- C. Rangarajan - Chairman, Prime Minister's Economic Advisory Council, Government of India
- Kaushik Basu - Professor, Cornell University USA
- M. V. Arunachalam - former Vice Chairman and Managing Director Tube Investments, Chennai
- Montek Singh Ahluwalia - Deputy Chairman Union Planning Commission, Government of India, New Delhi
- N. Vaghul - Chairman ICICI Bank, Mumbai
- Raja Jesudoss Chelliah - Founder Chairman Emeritus of Madras School of Economics
- S. Venkitaramanan - former Governor Reserve Bank of India (RBI), Mumbai
- U. Sankar - Honorary Professor Madras School of Economics, Chennai

== Areas of Specialization ==
The School's main areas of specialization are:

- Actuarial Economics
- Applied Quantitative Finance
- Environmental Economics
- Financial Economics
- General Economics

The School has worked with a broad range of public and private partners to develop research projects on issues such as growth and globalization, environmental sustainability, and investment opportunities.

== Centre of Excellence in Environmental Economics ==
The Ministry of Environment and Forest, Government of India has designated Madras School of Economics as a Centre of Excellence in the area of Environmental Economics. The Centre carries out research work on: Development of Economic Instruments, Trade and Environment, and Cost-Benefit Analysis. The Centre is primarily engaged in research projects, training programme and providing policy assistance to the Ministry on various topics. The Centre is also responsible for the development and maintenance of a website (http://coe.mse.ac.in), and for the dissemination of concept papers on Environmental Economics.

== Research ==
MSE undertakes research on its own as well as carries out research projects sponsored by various agencies such as, government departments, Ministries and International Organizations. In the past it has undertaken research funded by agencies such as World Resources Institute, Ministry of Environment & Forests, Government of India, the Union Planning Commission, Indian Space Research Organisation, United Nations Development Programme, Royal Netherlands Embassy, International Labour Organisation, The World Bank and Australian Centre for International Agricultural Research.

== Student Activities ==
"Arthiki" is an annual fest of Madras School of Economics, with many events like Quiz, Essay Writing, Crossword, Crisis Management etc. "Alpha" is a club to create a platform for the students, alumnus and faculty of Madras School of Economics to share their knowledge on topics related to finance and economics. The club conducts workshops, talks by eminent personalities from industry, quizzes and publishes a bi-annual editorial Athena, which is edited by expert student authors from the school and which has contributions from national and international academics and students. The school also has SPIC MACAY cultural programmes.

== Notable alumni ==
- Vinayak Sasikumar, Lyricist
