= Governor (film) =

2026 Indian film

Governor: The Silent Saviour
- Theatrical release poster
- Directed by: Chinmay D. Mandlekar
- Written by: Suvendu Bhattacharjee; Saurabh Bharat; Ravi Asrani; Vipul Amrutlal Shah
- Produced by: Vipul Amrutlal Shah
- Starring: Manoj Bajpayee; Adah Sharma; Noushad Mohamed kunju; Madhoo
- Cinematography: Vishal Sinha
- Edited by: Meghna Manchanda Sen; Sanjay Sharma
- Music by: Songs: Amit Trivedi; Score: Mannan Shaah
- Production company: Sunshine Pictures
- Distributed by: Sunshine Pictures
- Release date: 12 June 2026
- Running time: 122 minutes
- Country: India
- Language: Hindi
- Box office: ₹7.37 crore

Governor: The Silent Saviour is a 2026 Indian Hindi-language financial thriller film directed by Chinmay D. Mandlekar and produced by Vipul Amrutlal Shah under the banner Sunshine Pictures. The film stars Manoj Bajpayee, Adah Sharma, and Noushad Mohamed Kunju. The film is inspired by the events surrounding the 1990 Indian economic crisis featuring the institutional framework between the Reserve Bank of India (RBI) and the Government of India (GoI).

The film was released theatrically on 12 June 2026.

== Cast ==
- Manoj Bajpayee, as A. Ramanan, the Governor of the RBI (based on S. Venkitaramanan)
- Adah Sharma as Aditi Verma
- Noushad Mohamed Kunju as Deputy Governor (CR) (based on C. Rangarajan)
- Madhoo as Vandita, wife of Ramanan
- Paritosh Sand as Deio Head-Sharma
- Rajeev Gaursingh as finance minister Mr.Sinha
- Jigar Singh as Dr Manmohan Singh
- Jaywant Wadkar as RBI Peon Patil
- Sanjay Soni as Prime Minister Chandra Shekhar
- Rajiv Kumar as Atal Bihari Vajpayee
- Bhuvnesh Shetty as Commerce and Industry Minister & Law and Justice Minister Swamy
- John Forbes as Managing Director of IMF Michel/Marshal
- Mounis Ratta as Paresh (Popat), Aditi's Intern

== Production ==
In early May 2025, reports indicated that Manoj Bajpayee would collaborate with Vipul Amrutlal Shah on a political thriller titled Governor, produced under Shah's banner Sunshine Pictures and directed by Chinmay Mandlekar. The film had reportedly been in development for around two years, first with a different director who eventually backed out due to some other commitments. After recommendations from Bajpayee, Mandlekar came on board as director, following their collaboration on Inspector Zende (2025).

== Music ==
The film's music is composed by Amit Trivedi and Background score composed by Mannan Shaah, with lyrics penned by Javed Akhtar.

Governor

Soundtrack album by Amit Trivedi
- Released: 12 June 2026
- Studio: AT Studio
- Genre: Feature Film Soundtrack
- Length: 8:34
- Language: Hindi
- Label: Zee Music Company
- Producer: Amit Trivedi

Amit Trivedi chronology
Bandar (2026)	Governor (2026)	Bhai Tera Star Hai (2026)

Track listing
No.	Title	Lyrics	Singer(s)	Length
1.	"Jhagmag Jhagmag Jhilmil Jhilmil"	Javed Akhtar	Shashwat Singh	4:15
2.	"Thehro Dekhenge Hum Kab Tak"	Javed Akhtar	Javed Ali	4:19

== Marketing and release ==
Two first-look posters were unveiled on 23 April 2026, coinciding with Manoj Bajpayee's 57th birthday. The posters also revealed the film's release date as 12 June 2026. The official teaser was released on 7 May 2026. The official trailer was released on 26 May.

== Reception ==
On the review aggregator website Rotten Tomatoes, 10% of 10 critics' reviews are positive, with an average rating of 4.7/10.

Anurag Singh Bohra of India Today rated it 3.5/5 starsand writes that "Governor: The Silent Saviour may not be revolutionary, but its emotional honesty, stellar central performance, and respect for unsung duty make it a mature, worthwhile watch." Abhishek Srivastava of The Times of India gave 3 stars and said that "Governor tells an important story in an accessible manner, but often settles for explanation when it should be creating drama. There is real value in bringing this chapter of India's history to a wider audience, yet the film never fully taps into the tension and uncertainty that defined the crisis." Saibal Chatterjee of NDTV gave 2 stars out of 5 and stated that "Bajpayee's magnificently modulated performance cannot undo the effects of all the mendacity that sweeps through the film."

Nandini Ramnath of Scroll.in describes it as "Bajpayee affecting more sobriety than is available in the 122-minute Governor, which reduces a complex subject to a series of clever moves better suited to a magic show than a serious film." Devesh Sharma of Filmfare gave 2.5 stars out of 5 and said that "Ironically, Governor leaves audiences with plenty of questions. The problem is that none of them are the questions the film itself seems interested in asking." Shubhra Gupta of The Indian Express gave 1.5 stars out of 5 and said that "As befits propaganda films in the same vein as The Accidental Prime Minister, the story-telling is as basic as it can get."
