= Manmatha Nath Dutt =

Author, translator and Member of Royal Asiatic Society (1855–1912)

Manmatha Nath Dutt (Shastri)
- Born: 1855; Pabna, Bengal Presidency, British India
- Died: 1912 (aged 56–57)
- Education: Scottish Church College; Calcutta University (MA)
- Occupations: Author, translator
- Writing career
- Language: English, Sanskrit
- Years active: 1892-1912
- Period: 1892-1912
- Subjects: Hindu literature, religious scriptures, translation of the Ramayana, Mahabharata, Puranas and other ancient Indian texts.
- Notable works: Translation of the Garuda Purana, the Ramayana, the Mahabharata and other ancient Indian texts related to Hinduism and Buddhism, both religious and secular.
- Notable awards: Shastri, by Sanskrit College Calcutta in 1901

Manmatha Nath Dutt (Pabna, British India 1855–1912) was a prolific translator of ancient Hindu texts to English. He has translated many ancient Sanskrit texts to English. To this day, his translations remain one of the few or sometimes the only English versions of some Hindu scripture. He translated the Valmiki Ramayana (1892–1894), Markandeya Purana (1896), Bhagavata Purana (1896), Vishnu Purana (1896), Harivaṃśa (1897), Mahabharata (1895–1905), Mahanirvana Tantra (1900), several samhitas and dharmashastra texts (1906, 1908–09), Garuda Purana (1908) and Rig Veda Samhita (1906–1912) which remained incomplete. He has also translated the Kamandakiya Nitisara (1896) which is an ancient book authored by Kamandhaka based on Kautilya's Artha Shastra.

Apart from his translations of sacred and secular texts on Sanatana and Buddhism, he has also authored some books in English. Among them are his biography of Buddha (1901), and Gleanings from Indian classics (1893) which is a collection of famous stories and anecdotes from classical Sanskrit literature. In the introduction to this book, Manmatha Nath Dutt mentions that it was his attempt to clear western misconception about Hindu religion, literature, and philosophy.

== Biography ==
Manmatha Nath Dutt was born into a Bengali family at Pabna, Bengal Presidency in British India. He received his formal education in Calcutta University where he earned a MA in English and thereafter was awarded the title of Shastri by the Sanskrit College in Calcutta. He became the rector of the Keshub Academy an institute named after Keshub Chandra Sen. He did most of his translation work while he was a rector at Keshub Academy. He became the member of the Royal Asiatic Society in 1894. Indian scholar and economist Bibek Debroy, authored a book "Manmatha Nath Dutt: Translator Extraordinaire" which explored the life and legacy of Manmatha Nath Dutt. Eminent Indian freedom fighter Sucheta Kriplani was the maternal grand daughter of Manmatha Nath Dutt.

A road in North Kolkata (Manmatha Dutt Road) is named after him.
