= Anjali Menon =

Indian film director and screenwriter

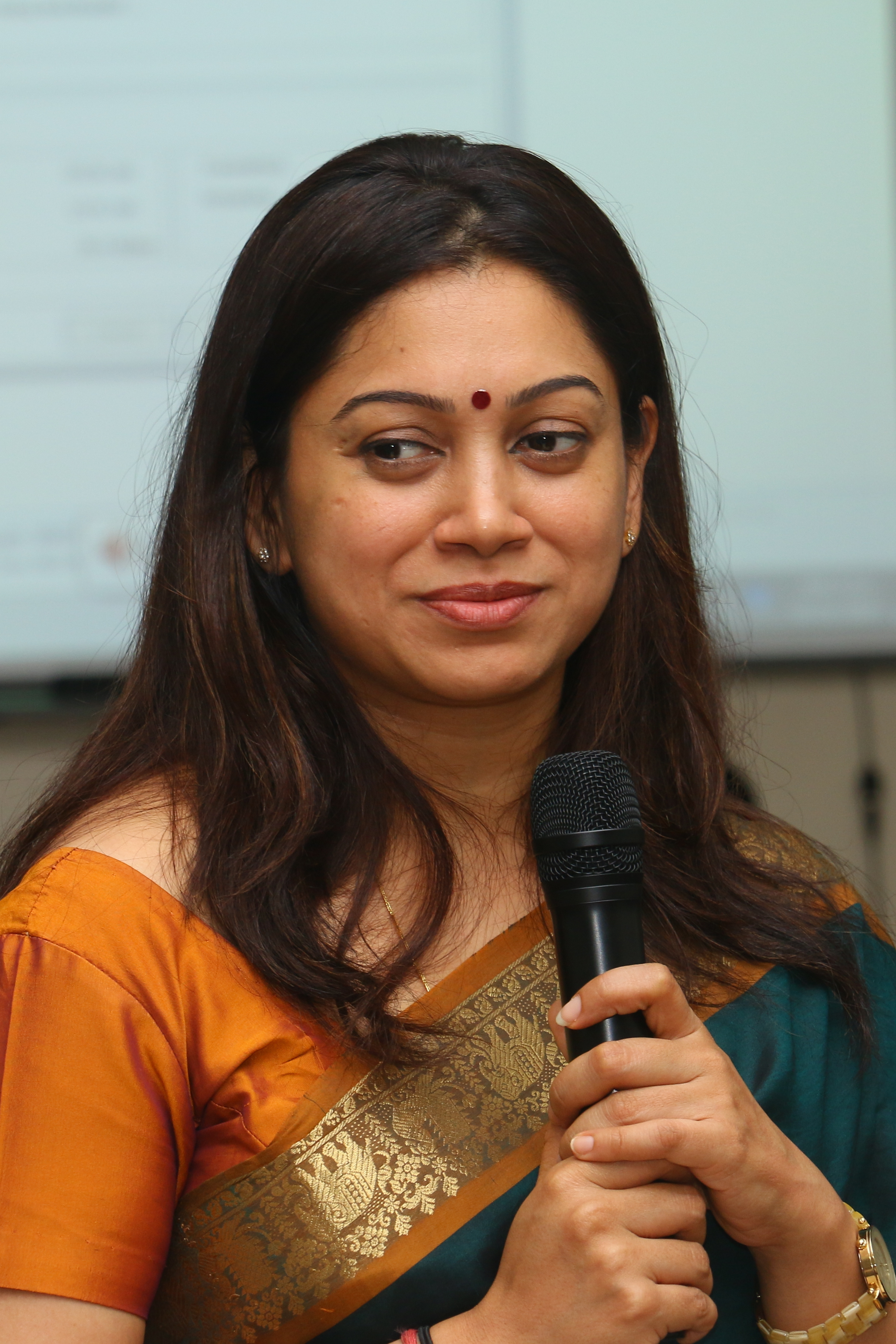
- Anjali at an event in 2016
- Born: Kozhikode, Kerala, India
- Education: Providence Women's College; Pune University; London Film School
- Occupation: Film director Screenwriter
- Years active: 2009–present
- Spouse: Vinod Menon
- Parent(s): T. Madhavan Nair; Sarada Nair
- Website: anjalimenon.in

Anjali Menon is an Indian film director, screenwriter and producer who predominantly works in Malayalam cinema. She is known for directing and writing films such as Manjadikuru, Kerala Cafe (segment: Happy Journey), Ustad Hotel, Bangalore Days and Koode. Her work has received recognition at international, national and state-level film awards.

Menon is the founder of Little Films, a production company based in Mumbai and Kerala that produces fiction and non-fiction works. She is also a co-founder of the Women in Cinema Collective (WCC), an organisation that advocates gender equality and greater representation of women in the Malayalam film industry. Menon serves on the board of the Mumbai Academy of the Moving Image (MAMI).

== Early life and education ==
Anjali Menon was born in Kozhikode to T. Madhavan Nair and Sarada Nair. She spent her childhood in Dubai, United Arab Emirates.

Menon graduated from the London Film School in 2003, receiving postgraduate qualifications with honours in film directing, film producing and film editing. Prior to her film studies, she earned a bachelor's degree from Providence Women's College, Kozhikode, and a master's degree in Communication Studies from the University of Pune. Menon has also received training in Indian classical dance and music.

== Career ==
=== 2000–2009 ===
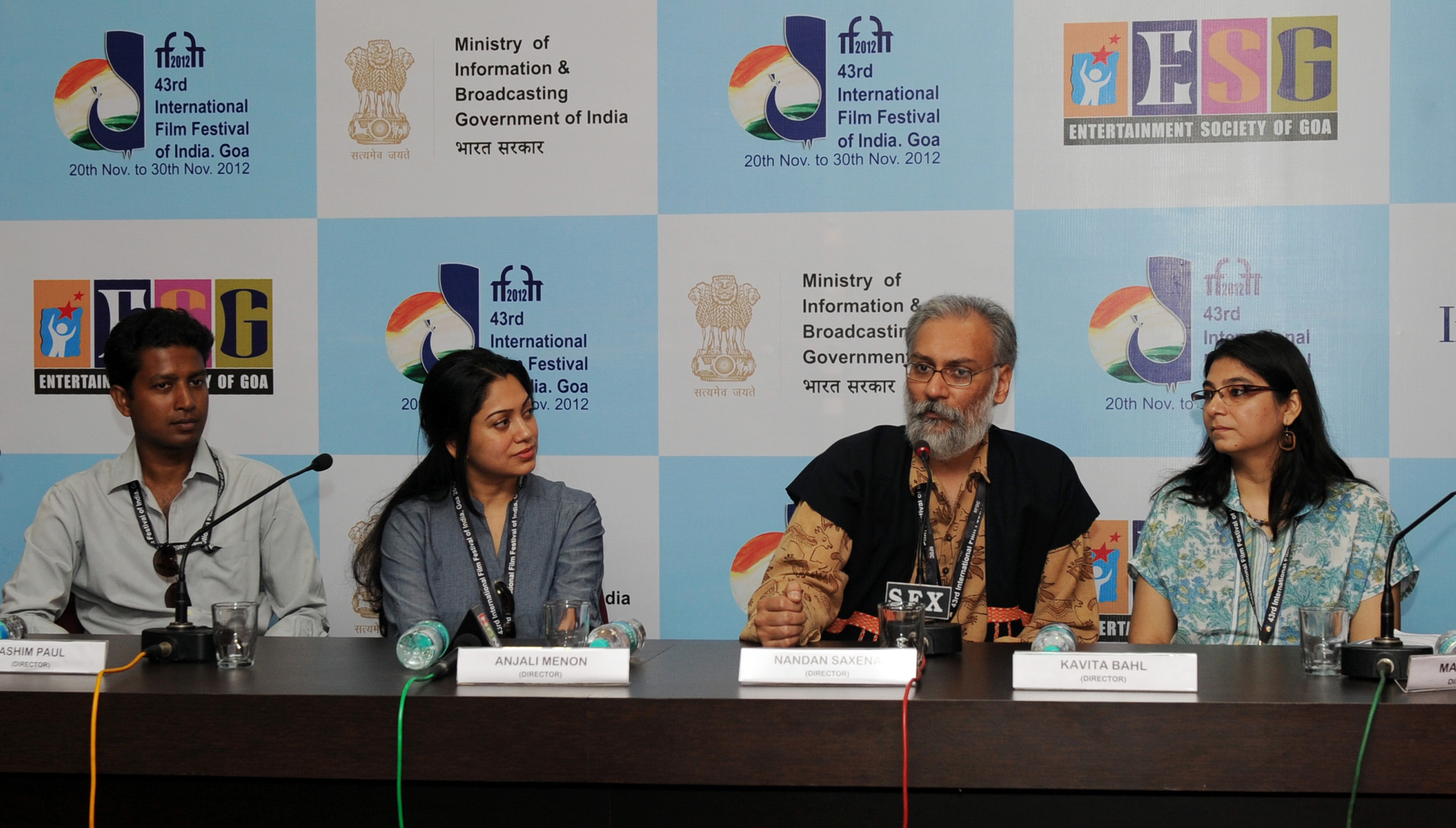
Anjali Menon (second from left) in a Press conference at the 43rd International Film Festival of India, 2012.

Anjali Menon began her career by editing and assisting producers in the production of educational documentaries. She subsequently worked as an event photographer and contributed feature articles to various journals. Her graduation film, Black Nor White, was produced by Asif Kapadia at the London Film School and starred Rez Kempton and Archie Panjabi. The film premiered at the Palm Springs International Film Festival and received the British Film Institute ImagineAsia Award.

Menon's feature film directorial debut, Manjadikuru, is a coming-of-age drama set in the early 1980s. The film's post-production was delayed for several years owing to issues involving the producer. Anjali Menon's production company, Little Films India, subsequently took over the project, completed the film, and released it in 2012.

Manjadikuru received positive critical reviews upon release, although its theatrical run was limited. It received the FIPRESCI Award for Best Malayalam Film and the Hassankutty Award at the International Film Festival of Kerala. Under its international title, Lucky Red Seeds, the film won several awards at the South Asian International Film Festival, including Best Film, Best Director, Best Screenplay, Best Cinematography and Best Upcoming Talent. Menon also received the Kerala State Film Award for Best Screenplay for her screenplay.

When the production of Manjadikuru was delayed, Anjali Menon worked on Kerala Cafe (2009), a Malayalam anthology film produced by Ranjith and Capitol Theatre. Anjali Menon directed the segment Happy Journey, a humorous story that explores gender relations. Starring Jagathy Sreekumar and Nithya Menen, the segment was screened at the Abu Dhabi International Film Festival and received the NETPAC Award at the International Film Festival of Kerala in 2009.

The segment received positive critical attention and contributed to Menon's emergence as a filmmaker in the Malayalam film industry.

=== 2012–2025 ===
Anjali Menon wrote the story, screenplay and dialogues for Ustad Hotel (2012), directed by Anwar Rasheed. The film is a drama that follows the relationship between a young non-resident Indian and his grandfather, who runs a seaside restaurant. The film received positive critical reception and was commercially successful.

At the 60th National Film Awards, Menon received the National Film Award for Best Screenplay for the film's screenplay and dialogues, while Ustad Hotel won the National Film Award for Best Popular Film Providing Wholesome Entertainment. Menon also received Best Writer awards at the Asianet Film Awards and the Vanitha Film Awards.

In 2014, Anjali Menon wrote and directed Bangalore Days, a comedy-drama that follows the lives of three Malayali cousins after they move to Bengaluru. The film was both a critical and commercial success. Its ensemble cast included Dulquer Salmaan, Nivin Pauly, Nazriya Nazim, Fahadh Faasil, Parvathy Thiruvothu, Nithya Menen, Isha Talwar and Kalpana. It was the first film produced by Anwar Rasheed Entertainment in association with Weekend Blockbusters.

Upon its release, Bangalore Days emerged as one of the highest-grossing Malayalam films of its time and received widespread attention from audiences beyond Kerala. Menon received the Kerala State Film Award for Best Screenplay for her work on the film, and was also honoured at the Filmfare Awards South and the Asianet Film Awards.

Menon wrote, directed and co-produced Koode (2018), a drama that explores themes of loss, family relationships and reconciliation. The film also addresses issues including migrant labour and child sexual abuse. It stars Prithviraj Sukumaran, Parvathy Thiruvothu, Nazriya Nazim and Ranjith. The film received positive reviews from critics, with particular attention given to its performances and direction.

Koode is an adaptation of the Marathi film Happy Journey by Sachin Kundalkar, although Menon's version incorporates several changes and additional narrative elements.

Anjali Menon's first direct-to-streaming feature film was in 2022 with Wonder Women, which she wrote and directed in English. The film is a slice-of-life drama that follows the prenatal experiences of six women who meet through a prenatal class. It was released on SonyLIV and produced by RSVP Movies and Flying Unicorn Entertainment.

The cast includes Nadhiya, Parvathy Thiruvothu, Nithya Menen, Amruta Subhash, Padmapriya Janakiraman, Sayanora Philip and Archana Padmini.

In 2025, Anjali Menon directed Backstage, a short film segment in the anthology Yuva Sapnon Ka Safar, which was released on Waves OTT. The film stars Rima Kallingal and Padmapriya Janakiraman, and is centred on female friendship within the world of Bharatanatyam. The film received positive reviews from critics and audiences.

=== Other works ===
Menon has delivered talks on subjects including filmmaking, community development, gender issues, entrepreneurship and parenting at institutions and events such as TED, Tata Institute of Social Sciences (TISS), TiE Global, Confederation of Indian Industry (CII), Kerala Startup Mission (KSUM) and IGCE.

In 2017, Anjali Menon co-founded Women in Cinema Collective (WCC), with Beena Paul, Rima Kallingal, Manju Warrier, Parvathy Thiruvothu, Geetu Mohandas, Vidhu Vincent, Remya Nambeesan, Deedi Damodaran and others.

She has served as a jury member for the International Film Festival of Kerala (IFFK), the India Film Project (IFP), Filmfare Awards and the Mumbai Academy of the Moving Image (MAMI), Menon serves on the Board of Trustees of MAMI.

Menon has also been involved in initiatives related to cultural documentation, including recording the work of cultural performers and collecting folklore. In addition to filmmaking, she has published short stories, screenplays and articles, and has maintained a personal blog.

== Themes and influences ==
Anjali Menon's movies have depicted themes of family, migrant experience, gender and cross-cultural interactions. She has mentioned Mira Nair, Padmarajan, Krzysztof Kieslowski, Robert Altman, Gulzar, and Marion Hansel as her inspirations, in pursuing film-making.

She portrays stories of non-resident Indians in her work and referred to her reverse migrant identity and hybrid sensibility in her work as an advantage. Anjali Menon is vocal about the need for gender equality in the workplace and sensitivity in on-screen portrayals.

== Personal life ==
Menon lives between India and Dubai, United Arab Emirates. Her husband is Vinod Menon

== Filmography ==
Year	Title	Director	Screenwriter	Notes
2000	Black Nor White	Yes	Yes	Short film
2009	Kerala Cafe	Yes	Yes	Happy Journey segment
2012	Manjadikuru	Yes	Yes	
2012	Ustad Hotel	No	Yes	
2014	Bangalore Days	Yes	Yes	
2018	Koode	Yes	Yes	
2022	Wonder Women	Yes	Yes	English film, Direct OTT release on Sony LIV.
2025	Backstage	Yes	Yes	English short film Part of Anthology series Yuva Sapno Ka Safar

== Awards ==
Award	Year	Film
BFI's Imagine Asia award for Best short film - silver		Black Nor White
World Premiere at Palm Springs International Film Festival		Black Nor White
Hassankutty Award for Best Debut Director	2008	Manjadikuru
FIPRESCI Prize for Best Malayalam Film	2008	Manjadikuru
60th National Film Awards for Best Dialogues	2012	Ustad Hotel
Kerala State Film Award for Best Screenplay	2012	Ustad Hotel
Asianet Film Awards - Best Screenplay	2013	Ustad Hotel
Kerala State Film Award for Best Screenplay (Original)	2014	Bangalore Days
Filmfare Awards South - Best Director	2015	Bangalore Days
Asianet Film Awards - Best Director and Best Popular Film	2015	Bangalore Days
Vanitha Film Awards - Best Director and Best Popular Film	2015	Bangalore Days
SIIMA Film Awards - Best Director and Best Film	2015	Bangalore Days
