= Providence Women's College =

Women's college in Kerala, India

- Type: Public
- Established: 1952
- Affiliations: University of Calicut
- Location: Kozhikode, Kerala, India; 11.2977°N 75.8058°E
- Campus: Urban
- Website: https://providencecollegecalicut.ac.in

Providence Women's College, is a college offering undergraduate, postgraduate courses and opportunities for doctoral and post doctoral studies. Founded by the Sisters of the Apostolic Carmel, it is located in Kozhikode, Kerala and was established in the year 1952 under the Madras University. The college is now affiliated with University of Calicut and gained autonomous status in 2024. This college offers different courses in arts, commerce and science. This is the first women's arts and science college in the Malabar region of Kerala, South India.

== Departments ==
=== Science ===
- Physics
- Chemistry
- Mathematics
- Computer Science
- Botany
- Zoology
- Psychology

=== Arts and Commerce ===
- Malayalam/ Hindi/ French
- English
- History
- Travel & Tourism Management
- Economics
- Commerce
- Business Administration
- Human Resource Management
- Social Work
- 5-year Integrated PG in International Relations and Politics

=== Certificate Courses ===
| Botany | Herbal Health Care and First Aid |
| Chemistry | Water Quality Assessment |
| Zoology | Course in Bioinformatics |
| Travel and Tourism | Foundation in Travel &Tourism (IATA) |
| Computer Science | Computer Hardware & Network Maintenance |
| Psychology | Life Skills Development |
| BBA & Commerce | Tally |
| Physics | Electronic Instrumentation |
| Mathematics | Basic Skills in Statistical Analysis |

== Accreditation ==
The college is recognized by the University Grants Commission (UGC).

It was granted a B++ grade in 2004, A+ grade from NAAC in 2017, A++ grade in 2023.

== Notable alumni ==
- Anna Rajam Malhotra- First women IAS officer
- Anjali Menon - Film Director, Screenwriter, Producer
- Jomol - Actress
- K. Ajitha, Activist
- P T Usha - 16th President of the Indian Olympic Association
- Neena Kurup - Actress
