= Anna Rajam Malhotra =

Indian administrative service officer

- Born: Anna Rajam George; 17 July 1927; Niranam, Kingdom of Travancore, British India (present day Pathanamthitta, Kerala, India)
- Died: 17 September 2018 (aged 91)
- Education: Providence Women's College, Kozhikode; Malabar Christian College, Kozhikode; University of Madras, Chennai
- Spouse: R. N. Malhotra
- Awards: Padma Bhushan

Anna Rajam Malhotra (née George; 17 July 1927 – 17 September 2018) was an Indian Administrative Service officer. She was the first woman in India to hold this position. Anna Rajam belonged to the 1951 batch of the IAS and married R. N. Malhotra, her batchmate.

== Early life and education ==
Anna Malhotra was born in 1927 in Niranam, Thiruvalla, Pathanamthitta as the daughter of Ottavelil O. A. George and Anna Paul. She was the granddaughter of Malayalam author Pailo Paul. She grew up in Calicut (Kozhikode district, Kerala) and completed her intermediate from Providence Women's College and bachelor's degree from Malabar Christian College in Calicut. In 1949, she obtained her master's in English literature from the University of Madras. She passed the civil services examination in 1950, and was the first woman to do so.

== Career ==
Malhotra was discouraged from joining the service by the board which consisted of four ICS officers, headed by R. N. Banerjee the Chairman of UPSC. She was instead offered the Foreign Service and Central Services because they were 'more suitable for women'. But, she argued her case and stood her ground.

Her first posting as a civil servant was in Madras State and reportedly chief minister C. Rajagopalachari was sceptical about giving a woman the charge of a district sub-collector and instead offered her a post in the Secretariat. She had undergone training in horse riding, rifle and revolver shooting and in using magisterial powers and hence did not comply and was eventually posted as the Sub Collector of Tirupattur in Madras State, becoming the first woman to do so. She held other positions in the Government of Madras including Under Secretary, Agriculture, Under Secretary and Deputy Secretary, Public, and Secretary to Government, Agriculture Department. She also held several important positions in the Government of India including Deputy Secretary, Department of Revenue, Ministry of Finance, Additional Secretary, Ministry of Agriculture, Chairperson, National Seeds Corporation, and Secretary to the Government of India, Ministry of Education and Culture.

She worked under seven chief ministers and worked closely with Rajiv Gandhi in the Asiad Project and briefly with Indira Gandhi.

As Chairperson, Nhava Sheva Port Trust, Anna Malhotra was responsible for building India's first computerised port, Nhavasheva, in Mumbai and was also the first woman to serve as a Secretary to the Government of India.

=== Award ===
She was awarded the Padma Bhushan in 1989.

== Death ==
Anna died in September 2018 at the age of 91.
