= Suresh Tendulkar =

Indian economist

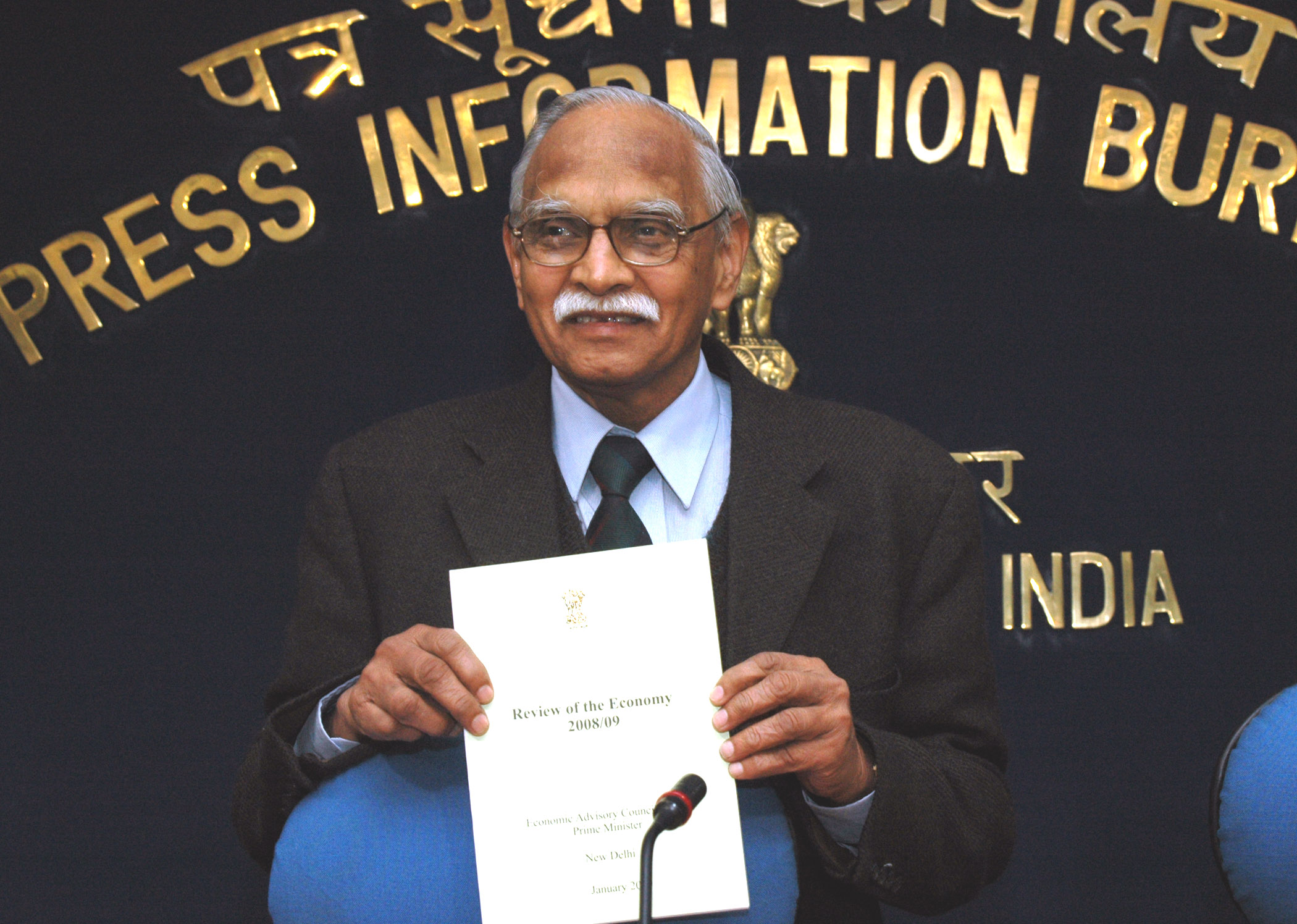
- Born: 15 February 1939
- Died: 21 June 2011 (aged 72); Pune, India
- Education: Pune University; Delhi School of Economics; Delhi University; Harvard University
- Occupation: Economist
- Known for: Report on Estimation of Poverty Tendulkar Method
- Spouse: Sunetra Tendulkar

Suresh D. Tendulkar (15 February 1939 – 21 June 2011) was an Indian economist and former chief of the National Statistical Commission. Tendulkar was a member of Prime Minister Manmohan Singh's Economic Advisory Council (PMEAC) from 2004 to 2008 and later served as its chairman from 2008 to 2009 when C. Rangarajan vacated the post to enter the Rajya Sabha. He died on 21 June 2011, due to cardiac arrest at Prayag Hospital, Pune (India).

== Early life ==
Suresh Tendulkar completed his B.Com. from Pune University, where he secured the top rank in his batch. He was born in a Maharashtrian brahmin family He then completed his M.A. from the Delhi School of Economics, topping his batch once again. He went on to obtain a PhD in Economics from Harvard University.

== Career ==
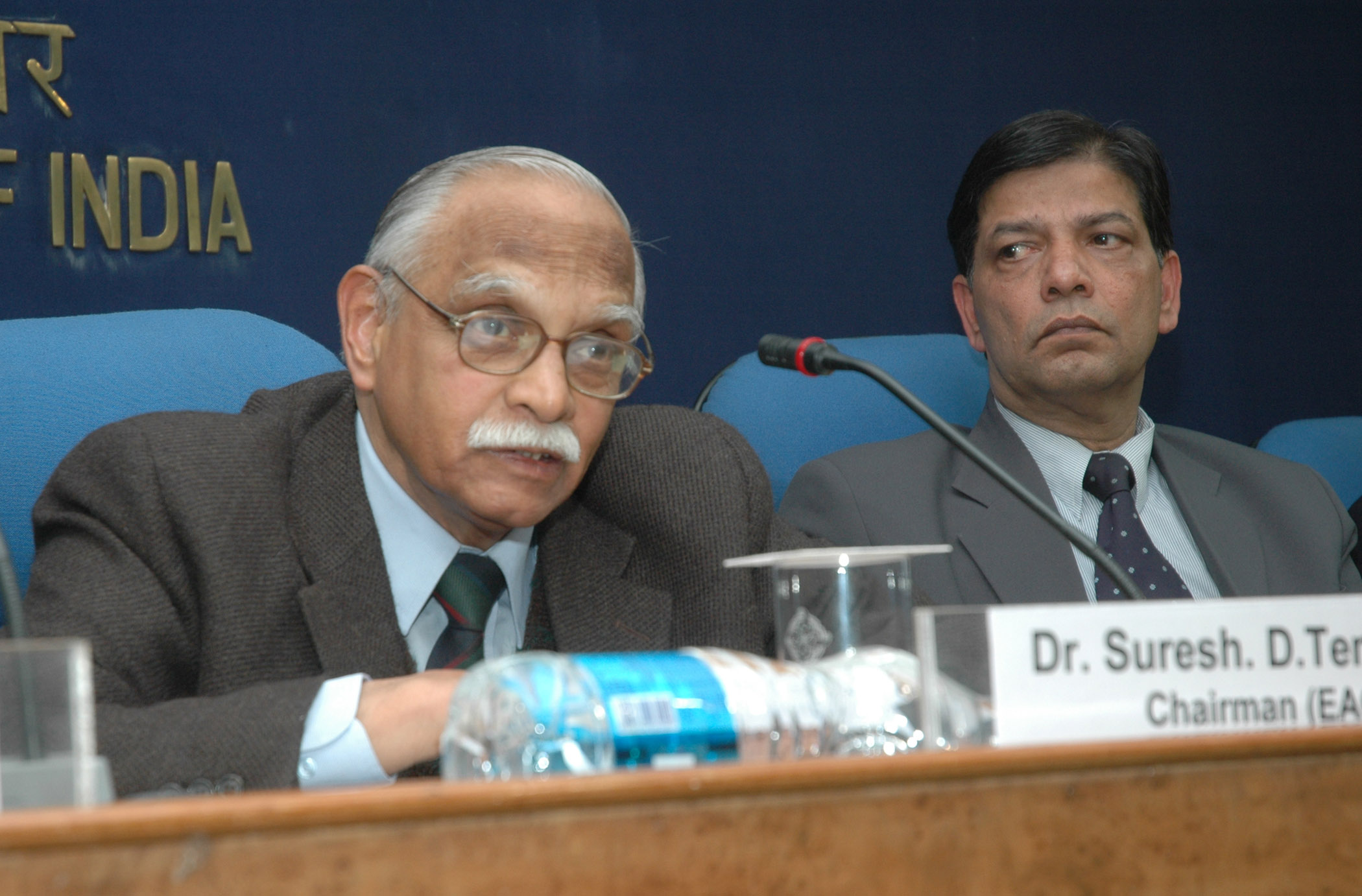
Suresh D. Tendulkar addressing a Press Conference, 2009

Tendulkar headed a namesake committee, The Suresh Tendulkar Committee, which was responsible for studying the portion of the population that lived below the poverty line (BPL). He also served as member of the Reserve Bank of India’s central board of directors. Prof. Tendulkar was known for his extensive work on "Credit and Privatisation policies" and "Indian development issues and policies", including liberalisation and globalisation. He was also a part-time member of the National Statistical Commission (2000–01), the first "Disinvestment Commission" (1996–99), and the Fifth "Central Pay Commission" (1994–97).

Prof. Tendulkar's pioneering contribution was his extensive work on poverty and estimation of people below poverty line (BPL). A committee was formed by government of India in 2005, with Tendulkar as chairman to 'report on methodology of estimation of poverty'. In 2009, this committee came out with a new method to calculate poverty. According to this method, the number of the poor in India in 2004–05 rose from 27.5 per cent of the total population to 37.2 per cent. In past, poverty was estimated by looking at a limited view of money required for stipulated minimum calorie intake by individuals. But the Tendulkar committee moved to a wider definition, including spending on food as well as education, health, light(electricity), clothing and footwear.

He was a professor of economics at the Delhi School of Economics, University of Delhi, India. He has authored several books, such as ‘Reintegrating India with the World Economy’ and ‘Understanding Reforms’ to name a few.
