= Raja Chelliah =

Indian economist

R. J. Chellaiah
- Born: Raja Jesudoss Chelliah; 12 December 1922
- Died: 7 April 2009 (aged 86)
- Occupations: Economist, Founding Chairman of Madras School of Economics
- Spouse: Sita Chelliah
- Children: Two daughters

Raja Jesudoss Chelliah (12 December 1922 – 7 April 2009) was an economist and founding chairman of the Madras School of Economics. He completed an MA in economics from the University of Madras and after few years of teaching at Madras Christian College, he was awarded the Fulbright-SmithMundt fellowship to pursue his PhD in economics from University of Pittsburgh. He worked as the chief of the Fiscal Analysis Division, Fiscal Affairs Department, International Monetary Fund between 1969 and 1975. He served as a consultant to the government of Papua New Guinea on Centre Provincial Financial Relations. He also worked in several state and central government financial institutions in India. He was considered a public finance expert in India, instrumental in bringing about the early reforms to the direct taxation structure. He was awarded Padma Vibushan in 2007. He is often referred to as "The Father of Tax Reforms".

== Personal life and education ==
He was born on 12 December 1922. His father Chelliah Nadar was his greatest inspiration. He graduated with a master's degree in economics from University of Madras and worked as a lecturer in Madras Christian College for five years before going to the United States on a Fulbright scholarship to do a PhD at the University of Pittsburgh. He was married to Sita Chelliah with whom he had two daughters. He died on 7 April 2009.

== Career ==
Upon his return from the United States, he worked as a senior economist at the National Council of Applied Economic Research, New Delhi between 1958 and 1961. He was a reader and professor at the Department of Economics of University of Rajasthan between 1961-1966 and professor of economics at Osmania University between 1966 and 1969. He was invited to work with the International Monetary Fund in Washington, D.C. and worked as a chief of Fiscal Analysis Division, Fiscal Affairs Department between 1969 and 1975. He was the founding director of the National Institute of Public Finance and Policy between 1976 and 1985. He was a member of the Planning Commission between 1985-1990 and also member of the Finance Commission from 1987 to 1989. He served as chairman of Tax Reforms Committee of Union Government between 1991 and 1993 and as chairman of the Tax Reforms and Revenue Augmentation Commission in Tamil Nadu during 2002-2003
