= Amitav Ghosh (banker) =

Indian banker (1930–2020)

16th Governor of the Reserve Bank of India
- In office 15 January 1985 – 4 February 1985
- Preceded by: Manmohan Singh
- Succeeded by: R. N. Malhotra

Deputy Governor of Reserve Bank of India
- In office 5 February 1985 – 20 January 1992
- Governor: I.G. Patel; Manmohan Singh
- In office 21 January 1982 – 15 January 1985
- Governor: R.N. Malhotra; S. Venkitaramanan

Personal details
- Born: 1930
- Died: 16 September 2020 (aged 89–90)

Amitav Ghosh (1930 – 16 September 2020) was an Indian banker. He served for 20 days from 15 January to 4 February 1985, as the 16th Governor of the Reserve Bank of India. His term was the shortest ever served by any Reserve Bank of India governor. He died at age 90.

== Career ==
Previously, Ghosh had been appointed RBI deputy governor. Before this Ghosh was the chairman of Allahabad Bank. He was also a Director of the IDBI Bank and was on the governing body of the National Institute of Bank Management.

== Notes ==
- List of Governors of RBI
