= Shamika Ravi =

Indian economist

Member of the Economic Advisory Council to the Prime Minister (EAC-PM)
- Incumbent
- Assumed office 2023

Secretary to the Government of India
- Incumbent
- Assumed office February 2023

Personal details
- Born: Patna, Bihar, India
- Education: Lady Shri Ram College, Delhi; New York University, New York
- Occupation: Economist

Dr. Shamika Ravi is an Indian economist and public policy researcher. She currently serves as a member of the Economic Advisory Council to the Prime Minister and as a Secretary to the Government of India. Her research focuses on public policy issues such as healthcare, gender equality, poverty alleviation, and economic development.

== Early life and education ==
Ravi is the daughter of R. N. Ravi, she was born in Patna, and raised in Kerala, India. She completed her undergraduate degree from Lady Shri Ram College, Delhi, in 1996. She later attended the Delhi School of Economics and received her Ph.D. in economics from New York University.

== Academic career ==
Ravi joined the Indian School of Business (ISB) in 2005 as a visiting faculty member, later becoming an assistant professor and eventually a professor of economics. She has taught courses in managerial economics, game theory, and microfinance.

Her research includes studies on health financing, women’s political participation, and financial inclusion. She co-authored the report Health and Morbidity in India (2004–2014), which analyzed the economic impact of public health insurance programs. Her academic work has appeared in journals such as the World Development, Journal of Urban Economics, and Journal of Development Economics.

== Policy roles and public engagement ==
Ravi has held multiple advisory and research roles:

- 2023–present: Member, Economic Advisory Council to the Prime Minister of India
- 2022–2023: Vice President, Economic Policy, Observer Research Foundation
- 2018–2020: Director of Research, Brookings Institution
- 2014–2018: Fellow, Brookings Institution

She is a regular contributor to Indian media outlets and has authored opinion pieces in newspapers such as The Indian Express, Mint, and The Hindu, focusing on data-driven policymaking and development economics.

== Research and views ==
Ravi’s work on gender and politics has examined women’s representation and voting behavior in Indian elections. She has advocated for targeted reservation policies based on empirical evidence of political exclusion. She has publicly opposed the use of randomized quotas, favoring a compensatory justice approach to policy design.

Her views on global trade have emphasized the need for India to balance protectionism with liberalization, particularly in light of international trade tensions.

Her contributions are also featured in edited volumes such as Economic Reasoning and Public Policy Case Studies from India published by RIS.

== Media and public discourse ==
Ravi frequently appears in public policy forums, academic panels, and national media, focusing her commentary on economic development challenges, data governance, health systems, and evidence-based structural reforms. She is a regular columnist for major news and media platforms, including writing on macroeconomic strategy and historical comparisons in outlets like The Indian Express. Her insights and profile have been featured across multiple media programs and platforms, including SheThePeople, Open Magazine, and the Asia Society.

=== Commentary on exchange rates and inflation ===
In June 2026, amid geopolitical tensions in West Asia and global crude oil supply disruptions that caused the Indian rupee (INR) to face downward pressure against the US dollar (USD), Ravi's commentary on exchange rate policy drew significant public and media attention. Speaking on an ANI podcast, she dismissed the psychological significance of the currency approaching the triple-digit threshold, stating, "So what? 100 is just a number".

Ravi argued that an exchange rate should be market-determined and function as a natural "adjustment mechanism" or safety valve to absorb external supply-side shocks. According to her framework, artificial interventions by the government or the Reserve Bank of India (RBI) to defend an arbitrary currency level are counterproductive and run the risk of introducing severe inflationary pressures and domestic market distortions. She maintained that the state's economic focus should prioritize overall macroeconomic stability, fiscal prudence, and managing demand through the curb of wasteful consumption, rather than fixating on a symbolic exchange rate milestone.

While Ravi defended the policy by asserting that India's broader economy remained in a phase of sustained high growth, her comments sparked public debate and drew criticism from opposition figures, market analysts, and social media commentators. Critics argued that downplaying a weakening currency overlooks the immediate, real-world consequences on the general public, specifically regarding higher import bills, increased prices for everyday essentials, costlier fuel, and reduced household purchasing power.

== See also ==
- Prime Minister of India
- Gender equality in India
- Development economics
