= Garuda Purana =

Ancient Sanskrit scripture

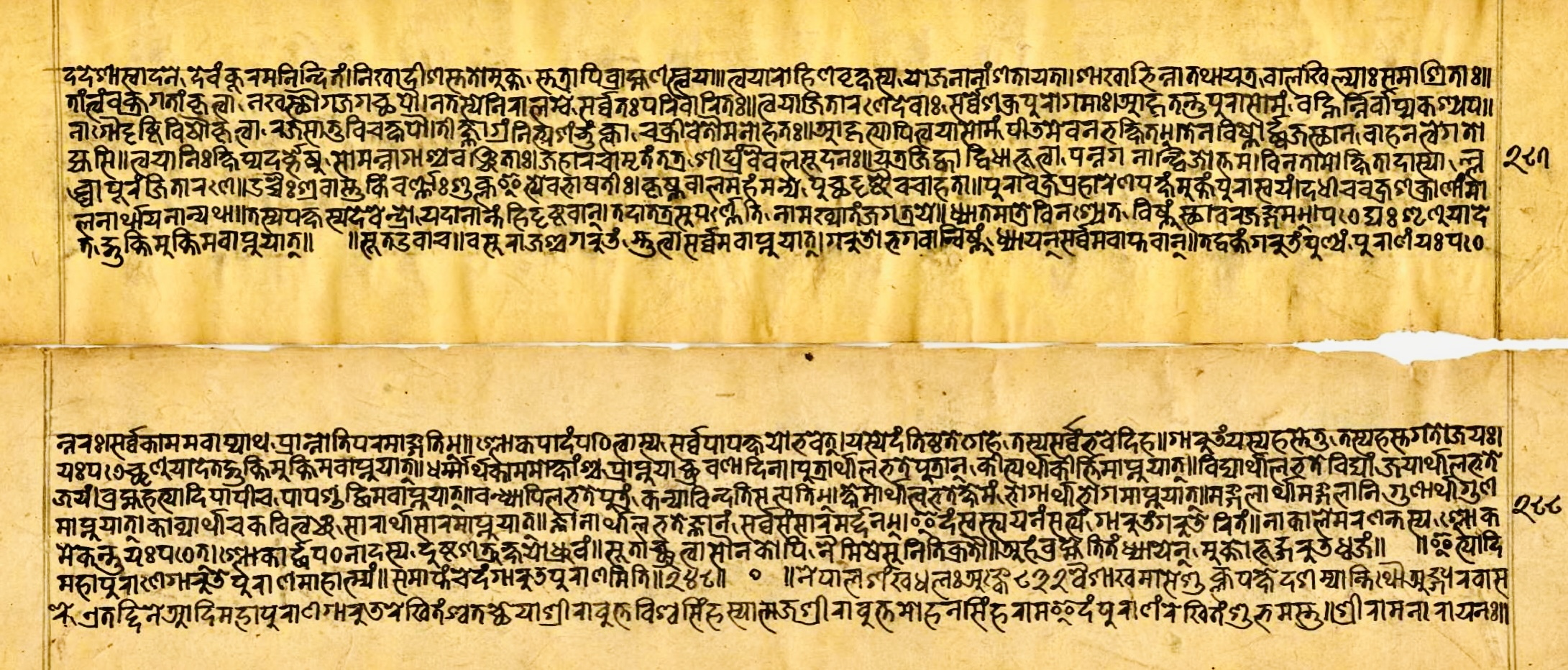
Manuscript of Garuda Purana in Sanskrit language and Newar script

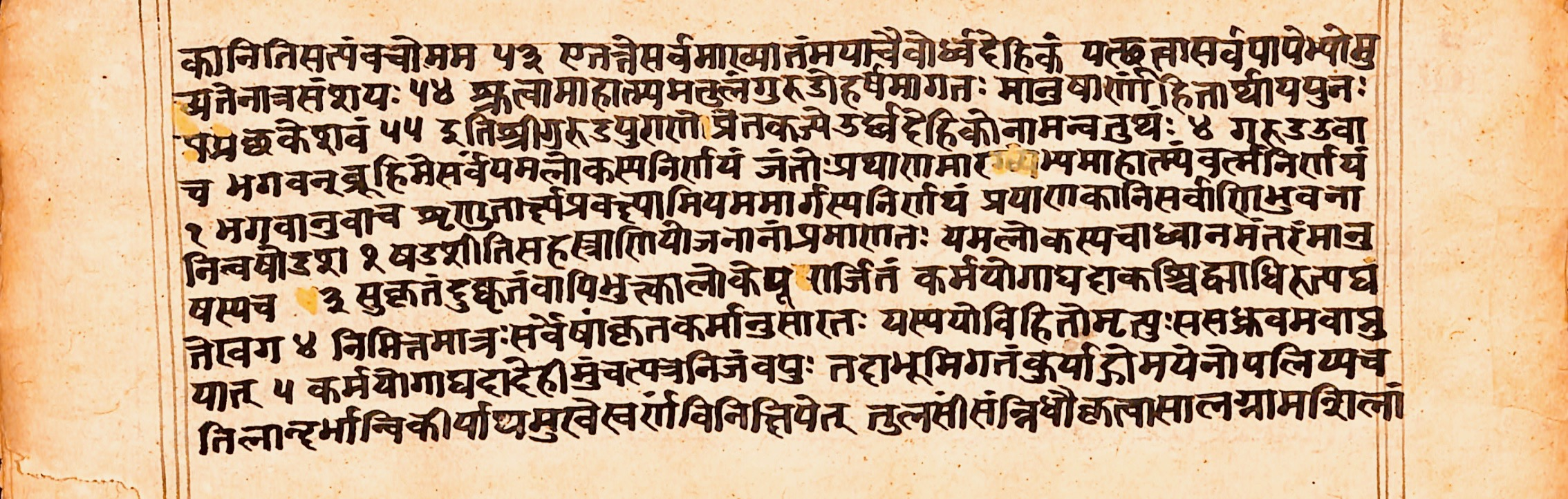
A page from a Garuda Purana manuscript (Sanskrit, Devanagari)

The Sanskrit text Garuda Purana (Sanskrit: गरुड पुराण, romanized: Garuḍa Purāṇa) is one of 18 Mahapuranas in Hinduism. The Garuda Purana was likely composed in the first millennium CE, with significant expansions and revisions occurring over several centuries. Scholars estimate that the earliest core might date back to between the 4th and 11th centuries CE, with substantial additions and modifications continuing into the 2nd millennium CE.

While Garuda Purana text is traditionally belived to have 19,000 verses, surviving manuscripts and printed editions preserve roughly 8,000 verses. Its chapters treat a range of subjects including cosmogony, mythology, inter-deity relations, ethics and dharma, philosophical systems, the philosophy and practice of yoga, karmic retribution, svarga and naraka, saṃsāra (cycle of rebirth), śrāddha (ancestral rites) and pathways to mokśa; rivers and geography, types of minerals and stones, the testing of gems for their quality, lists of plants and herbs, various diseases and their symptoms, various medicines, aphrodisiacs, and prophylactics; astronomy, astrology, the moon and planets, and the Hindu calendar and its basis; architecture, home building, and the essential features of a Hindu temple; rites of passage, charity and gift making, economy, thrift, the duties of a king, politics, and state officials and their roles and how to appoint them; and genres of literature and rules of grammar. The final chapters discuss how to practice yoga (Samkhya and Advaita types), personal development, and the benefits of self-knowledge.

The Padma Purana categorizes the Garuda Purana—along with the Bhagavata Purana, the Vishnu Purana and itself—as a sattva Purana (a Purana that represents goodness and purity). The text, like all Mahapuranas, is attributed to the sage Vyasa in the Hindu tradition.

== History ==
According to Pintchman, the text was composed sometime in the first millennium CE, but likely compiled and changed over a long period of time. Gietz et al. place the first version of the text only between the fourth and eleventh centuries CE.

Leadbeater states that the text is likely from about 900 CE, given that it includes chapters on Yoga and Tantra techniques that likely developed later. Other scholars suggest that the earliest core of the text may be from the first centuries of the common era, and additional chapters were added thereafter through the sixth century or later.

The version of the Garuda Purana that survives into the modern era, states Dalal, is likely from 800 to 1000 CE, with sections added in the 2nd millennium. Pintchman suggests 850 to 1000 CE. Chaudhuri and Banerjee, as well as Hazra, on the other hand, state that it cannot be from before about the tenth or eleventh century CE.

The text exists in many versions, with varying numbers of chapters and considerably different content. Some Garuda Purana manuscripts have been known by the titles "Sauparna Purana" (mentioned in Bhagavata Purana section 12.13), "Tarksya Purana" (the Persian scholar Al-Biruni who visited India mentions this name), and "Vainateya Purana" (mentioned in Vayu Purana sections 2.42 and 104.8).

The book Garudapuranasaroddhara, translated by Ernest Wood and SV Subrahmanyam, appeared in the late nineteenth and early twentieth centuries. This, states Ludo Rocher, created major confusion because it was mistaken for the Garuda Purana, a misidentification first discovered by Albrecht Weber. Garuda-purana-saroddhara is actually the original bhashya work (commentary) of Naunidhirama, which cites a section of the now nonexistent version of Garuda Purana as well as other Indian texts. The earliest translation of one version of the Garuda Purana, by Manmatha Nath Dutt, was published in the early twentieth century.

== Structure ==
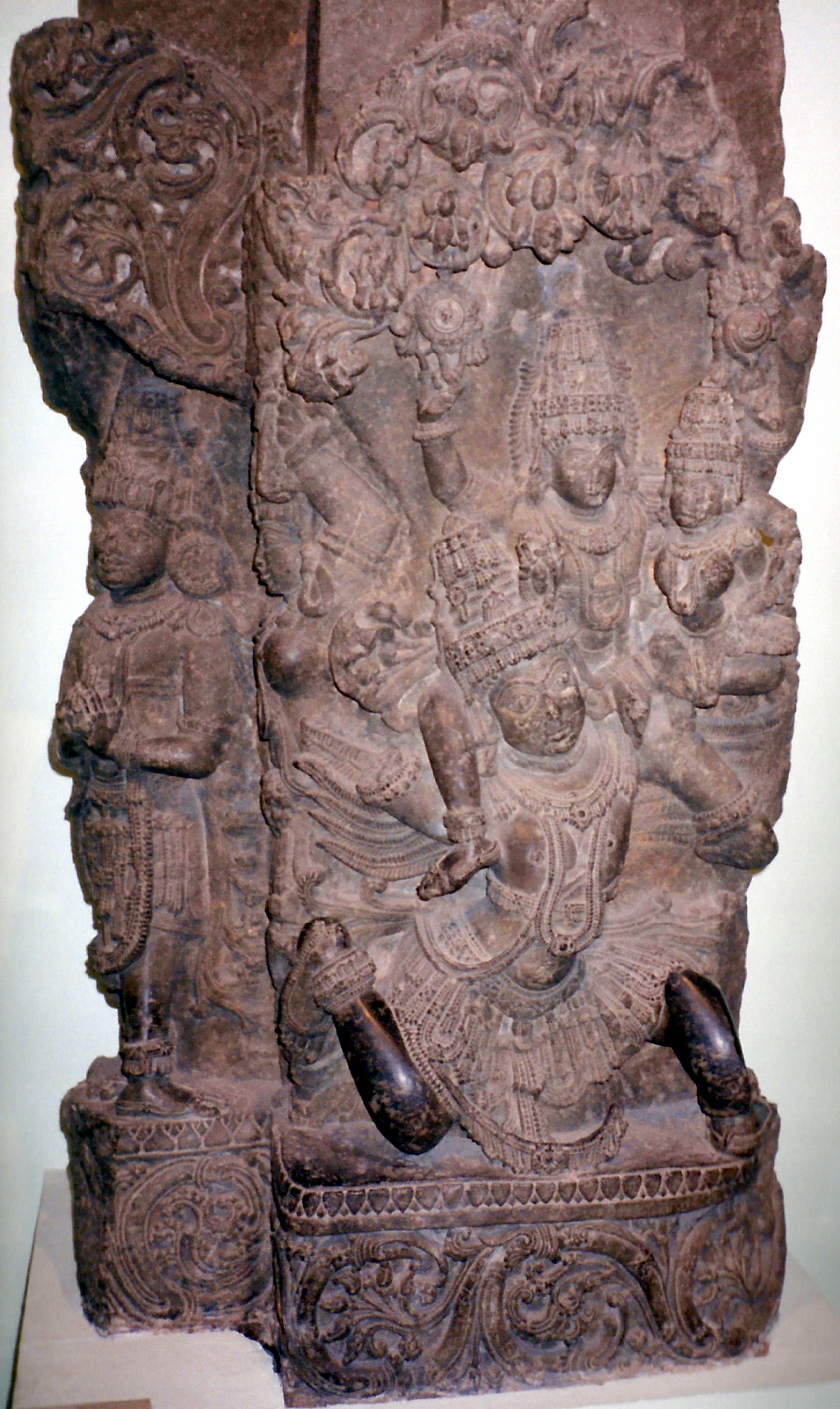
The text of the Garuda Purana revolves around the god Vishnu, as recited by Garuda. Above: Vishnu and Lakshmi on Garuda (Delhi National Museum).

The Garuda Purana is a Vaishnava Purana and has, according to the tradition, 19,000 shlokas (verses). However, the manuscripts that have survived into the modern era have preserved about 8,000 verses. These are divided into two parts: a Purvakhanda (early section) and an Uttarakhanda (later section, more often known as Pretakhanda or Pretakalpa). The Purvakhanda contains about 229 chapters, but in some versions of the text this section has between 240–243 chapters. The Uttarakhanda varies between 34 and 49 chapters. The Venkatesvara Edition of the Purana has an additional Khanda named Brahmakhanda.

The Garuda Purana was likely fashioned after the Agni Purana, the other major medieval India encyclopedia that has survived. The text's structure is idiosyncratic, in that it is a medley, and does not follow the theoretical structure expected in a historic puranic genre of Indian literature. It is presented as information that Garuda (the man-bird vehicle of Vishnu) learned from Vishnu and then narrated to the sage Kashyapa, which then spread in the mythical forest of Naimisha to reach the sage Vyasa.

== Contents: Purvakhanda ==
The largest section (90%) of the text is Purvakhanda, which discusses a wide range of topics associated with life and living. The remaining is Pretakhanda, which deals primarily with rituals associated with death and cremation.

=== Cosmology ===
The cosmology in Garuda Purana centers on Vishnu as the Supreme Reality (Para-Brahman), acting through his eternal consort Lakshmi. In this framework, Vishnu represents the immutable efficient cause (nimitta-kāraṇa), while Lakshmi functions as his dynamic potency (Shakti). Lakshmi is also the material matrix (prakṛti) through which the creation unfolds, maintaining their ontological unity as opposed to a transient division.

Like other Puranas, the cosmogenesis in Garuda Purana weaves the Samkhya theory of two realities—the Purusha (spirit) and Prakriti (matter), the masculine and feminine—presented as interdependent, each playing a different but essential role to create the observed universe. Goddess Lakshmi is the creative power of Prakriti, the cosmic seed and the source of creation. God Vishnu is the substance of Purusha, the soul and the constant. Pintchman states that the masculine and the feminine are presented by the Garuda Purana as inseparable aspects of the same divine, metaphysical truth Brahman.

Madan states that the Garuda Purana elaborates the repeatedly found theme in Hindu religious thought that the living body is a microcosm of the universe, governed by the same laws and made out of the same substances. All the gods are inside the human body; what is outside the body is present within it as well. Body and cosmos, states Madan, are equated in this theme. Vishnu is presented by the text as the supreme soul within the body.

=== Deity worship ===
The text describes Vishnu, Vaishnava festivals and puja (worship), and offers mahatmya (a pilgrimage tour guide) to Vishnu-related sacred places. However, the Garuda Purana also includes significant sections with reverence for Shaiva, Shakti, and Smarta traditions, including the Panchayatana puja of Vishnu, Shiva, Durga, Surya (Sun), and Ganesha.

While the text provides instructions for the worship of Shiva, Surya, Ganesha, and Durga—incorporating ascpects of Pañcāyatana ritual—it maintains a distinct Vaishnava theological structure. Other deities are presented either as manifestations of Vishnu's cosmic form or as subordinate cosmic functionaries. They derive their authority from Narayana, who remains the sole dispenser of liberation (mokṣa).

=== Features of a temple ===
The Garuda Purana describes an 8×8 (64) grid Hindu Temple floorplan in chapter 47 of the Purvakhanda.

The Garuda Purana includes chapters on the architecture and design of a temple. It describes recommended layouts and dimensional ratios for design and construction.

In the first design, it recommends that a plot of ground should be divided into a grid of 8×8 (64) squares, with the four innermost squares forming the chatuskon (adytum). The core of the temple, states the text, should be reachable through 12 entrances, and the walls of the temple raised touching the 48 of the squares. The height of the temple plinth should be based on the length of the platform, the vault in the inner sanctum should be co-extensive with adytum's length with the indents therein set at a third and a fifth ratio of the inner vault's chord. The arc should be half the height of pinnacle, and the text describes various ratios of the temple's exterior to the adytum, those within adytum and then that of the floor plan to the vimana (spire).

The second design details a 16 square grid, with four inner squares (pada) for the adytum. The text thereafter presents the various ratios for the temple design. The dimensions of the carvings and images on the walls, edifices, pillars and the murti are recommended by the text to be certain harmonic proportions of the layout (length of a pada), the adytum and the spire.

The text asserts that temples exist in many thematic forms. These include the bairaja (rectangle themed), puspakaksa (quadrilateral themed), kailasha (circular themed), malikahvaya (segments of sphere themed), and tripistapam (octagon themed). The text claims these five themes create 45 different styles of temples, from the Meru style to Shrivatsa style. Each thematic form of temple architecture permits nine styles of temples, and the Purana lists all 45 styles. It also states that within these various temple styles, the inner edifice is best in five shapes: triangle, lotus-shaped, crescent, rectangular, and octagonal. The text thereafter describes the design guidelines for the Mandapa and the Garbha Griha.

Apart from architectural specifications, the text links temple geometry to consecrated space. The Vāstu-puruṣa-maṇḍala reflects the cosmic link between the human body, the universe, and the Supreme Reality. This transcendent deity—consecrated as iconic presence of the divine(arcā)—acts as a conduit for this cosmic connection as opposed being just a symbolic design element.

=== Gemology ===
Gems: how to buy them?

First the shape, color, defects or excellences of a gem should be carefully tested and then its price should be ascertained in consultation with a gem expert who has studied all the books dealing with the precious stones.

— Garuda Purana, Purvakhanda, chapter 68
(translator: MN Dutt)

The Garuda Purana describes 14 gems, their varieties, and how to test their quality. The gems discussed include ruby, pearl, yellow sapphire, hessonite, emerald, diamond, cat's eye, blue sapphire, coral, red garnet, jade, colorless quartz, bloodstone and Bhīṣmamaṇi. The technical discussion of gems in the text is woven with its theories on the mythical creation of each gem, astrological significance, and talisman benefits.

The text describes the characteristics of the gems, how to clean and make jewelry from them, and cautions that gem experts should be consulted before buying them. For example, it describes using jamvera fruit juice (contains lime) mixed with boiled rice starch in order to clean and soften pearls, then piercing them to make holes for jewelry. A sequential vitanapatti method of cleaning, states the text—wherein the pearls are cleaned with hot water, wine, and milk—gives the best results. It also describes a friction test by which pearls should be examined. Similar procedures and tests are described for emerald, jade, diamonds, and all other gems included in the text.

=== Laws of virtue ===
Chapter 93 of the Garuda Purvakhanda presents sage Yajnavalkya's theory on laws of virtue. The text asserts that knowledge is condensed in the Vedas, in texts of different schools of philosophy such as Nyaya and Mimamsa, in the Shastras on dharma, on making money and temporal sciences written by 14 holy sages. Thereafter, through Yajnavalkya, the text presents its laws of virtue. The first one it lists is dāna (charity), which it defines as:

A gift, made at a proper time and place, to a deserving person, in a true spirit of compassionate sympathy, carries the merit of all sorts of pious acts.

— Garuda Purana, chapter 93

The text similarly discusses the following virtues—right conduct, damah (self-restraint), ahimsa (non-killing, non-violence in actions, words, and thoughts), studying the Vedas, and performing rites of passage. The text presents different set of diet and rites of passage rules based on the class and stage of life of a person. . In one version of the Garuda Purana, these chapters on laws of virtue are borrowed from and duplicates of nearly 500 verses found in the Yajnavalkya Smriti. The various versions of Garuda Purana show significant variations.

The Garuda Purana asserts that the highest and most imperative religious duty is to introspect into one's own soul, seeking self-communion.

=== Ethics (Nityaachaara) ===
The chapter 108 and thereafter, present Garuda Purana's theories on Nityaachaara (नित्याचार, lit. 'ethics and right conduct') towards others.

Quit the country where you can find neither friends nor pleasures, nor in which there is any knowledge to be gained.

— Garuda Purana, chapter 109

Ethics

Little by little a man should acquire learning.
Little by little a mountain should be climbed.
Little by little desires should be gratified.

— Garuda Purana, Purvakhanda, chapter 109
(translator: MN Dutt)

The Garuda Purana asserts: save money for times of distress, but be willing to give it up all to save your wife. It is prudent to sacrifice oneself to save a family, and it is prudent to sacrifice one family to save a village. It is prudent to save a country if left with a choice to save the country or a village. Yet, in verses that follow, it says a man should renounce that country whose inhabitants champion prejudice, and forgo the friend who he discovers to be deceitful.

The text cautions against application of knowledge which is wedded to meanness, against pursuit of physical beauty without ennobling mind, and against making friends with those who abandon their dear ones in adversity. It is the nature of all living beings to pursue one's own self-interest. Yet, do not acquire wealth through vicious means or by bowing down to your enemies.

The text also asserts that: men of excellence live with honest means, are true to their wives, pass their time in intellectual pursuits and are hospitable to newcomers. Eternal are the rewards when one weds one's knowledge with noble nature, deep is the friendship roused by connection of the soul. The discussion on ethics is mixed in other chapters.

=== Good government ===
Governance is part of the 'Neeti Shaastra' section of the Garuda Purana, and this section influenced later Indian texts on politics and economy.

The Purvakhanda, from chapter 111 onwards, describes the characteristics of a good king and good government. Dharma should guide the king, the rule should be based on truth and justice, and he must protect the country from foreign invaders. Taxation should be bearable, never cause hardship on the merchants or taxpayers, and should be similar in style to one used by the florist who harvests a few flowers without uprooting the plants and while sustaining the future crops. A good government advances order and prosperity for all.

A stable king is one whose kingdom is prosperous, whose treasury is full, and who never chastises his ministers or servants. He secures services from the qualified, honest and virtuous, rejects the incapable, wicked and malicious, states chapter 113. A good government collects taxes like a bee collecting honey from all the flowers when ready and without draining any flower.

=== Medicine (Dhanvantari Samhita) ===
Chapters 146–218 of the Purvakhanda present the Dhanvantari Samhita, its treatise on medicine. The opening verses assert that the text describes the pathology, pathogeny, and symptoms of all diseases studied by ancient sages, in terms of its causes, incubation stage, manifestation in full form, amelioration, location, diagnosis, and treatment.

Parts of the pathology and medicine-related chapters of Garuda Purana, states Ludo Rocher, are similar to Nidanasthana of Vagbhata's Astangahridaya, and these two may be different manuscript recensions of the same underlying but now lost text. Susmita Pande states that other chapters of Garuda Purana, such as those on nutrition and diet to prevent diseases, are similar to those found in the more ancient Hindu text Sushruta Samhita.

The text includes various lists of diseases, agricultural products, herbs, and formulations with claims to medicinal value. For example, chapters 202 and 227 of the Purvakhanda list Sanskrit names of over 450 plants and herbs, along with claims to their nutritional or medicinal value.

Veterinary science

The chapter 201 of the text presents veterinary diseases of horses and their treatment. The verses describe various types of ulcers and cutaneous infections in horses, and 42 herbs for veterinary care formulations.

=== Yoga (Brahma Gita) ===
The last ten chapters of the Purvakhanda are dedicated to Yoga, and are sometimes referred to as the Brahma Gita. This section is notable for references to Hindu deity Dattatreya as the guru of Ashtanga (eight-limbed) Yoga.

Moksha is Oneness

The Yogins, through Yoga,
realise their being with the supreme Brahman.
Realization of this is called Mukti.

— Garuda Purana, Purvakhanda, chapter 235
(abridged, translator: MN Dutt)

The text describes a variety of asanas (postures), then adds that the postures are means, not the goal. The goal of Yoga is meditation, samadhi, and self-knowledge.

Ian Whicher states that the Garuda Purana in chapter 229 recommends using saguna Vishnu (with form like a murti) in the early stages of Yoga meditation to help concentration and draw in one's attention with the help of the gross form of the object. After this has been mastered, states the text, the meditation should shift from saguna to nirguna, unto the subtle, abstract formless Vishnu within, with the help of a guru (teacher). These ideas of Garuda Purana were influential, and were cited by later texts such as in verse 3.3 of the 17th-century Arthabodhini.

== Contents: Pretakhanda ==
The Last Goodbye

Go forth, go forth upon those ancient pathways,
By which your former fathers have departed.
Thou shalt behold god Varuna, and Yama,
both kings, in funeral offerings rejoicing.
Unite thou with the Fathers and with Yama,
with istapurta in the highest heaven.
Leaving behind all blemish homeward return,
United with thine own body, full of vigor.

— Yama, Yama Suktam, Rigveda 10.14, Yama Suktam (abridged)
(the cremation hymn in Garuda Purana)
(translator: Mariasusai Dhavamony)

The second section of the text, also known as Uttarakhanda and Pretakalpa, includes chapters on funeral rites and life after death. This section was commented upon by Navanidhirama in his publication Garuda Purana Saroddhara, which was translated by Wood and Subramanyam in 1911.

The text specifies the following for last rites:

A dead child, who died before completing his second year, should be buried instead of being cremated, and no sort of Sraddha or Udaka-kriya is necessary. The friends or relatives of a child, dead after completing its second year of life, shall carry its corpse to the cremation ground and exhume it in fire by mentally reciting the Yama Suktam.

— Rigveda 10.14, Garuda Purana, Yama Suktam, 10.14

The Pretakhanda is the second and minor part of Garuda Purana. Rocher states that it is "entirely unsystematic work" presented with motley confusion and many repetitions in the Purana, dealing with "death, the dead and beyond". Monier Monier-Williams wrote in 1891 that portions of verses recited at cremation funerals are perhaps based on this relatively modern section of the Garuda Purana, but added that Hindu funeral practices do not always agree with guidance in the Garuda Purana. Three quite different versions of the Pretakhanda of the Garuda Purana are known, and the variation between the chapters, states Jonathan Parry, is enormous.

The Pretakhanda also talks in details about the various types of hell and the sins that can lead one into them. It gives a detailed description of what a soul goes through after death, having met the yamaduta and the journey to naraka in the year following the death.

== Contents: Brahmakhanda ==
Available only in the Venkateswara Edition of the Garuda Purana, the Brahmakhanda has 29 chapters in the form of an interlocution between Krishna and Garuda, on the supremacy of Vishnu, the nature and form of other gods, and the description of the shrine of Venkateshvara at Tirupati and other Tirthas there. While speaking about the supremacy of Vishnu and the nature of other gods, it criticises some of the Advaitic doctrines (like Upadhi, Maya, and Avidya) and upholds the doctrine of Madhvacharya's school, a distinctive feature which is scarcely observed in any other Purana.

The Brahmakhaṇḍa contains 29 chapters and is preserved in editions such as the Venkatesvara press printing. Analyzing it philosophically indicates a later date of compilation as the section is absent from the descriptive summary of Garuda Purana given in the Naradiya Purana. The Brahmakhanda focuses on Vedantic theology with detailed discourses between Brahma and Vyasa. It presents a strong theistic framework based on absolute supremacy of Vishnu as the ontological reality of the world. It also presents devotion (bhakti) as the primary means of salvation (moksha) for the individual souls (jivā).

== See also ==
- Bhagavata Purana
- Ganesha Purana
- Skanda Purana

== Bibliography ==
- Dalal, Rosen (2014). Hinduism: An Alphabetical Guide. Penguin. ISBN 978-8184752779.
- Dutt, Manmatha Nath (1908). The Garuda Puranam. SRIL, Calcutta (archived by Harvard University Library).
- K P Gietz; et al. (1992). Epic and Puranic Bibliography (Up to 1985) Annoted and with Indexes: Part I: A - R, Part II: S - Z, Indexes. Otto Harrassowitz Verlag. ISBN 978-3-447-03028-1.
- Ariel Glucklich (2008). The Strides of Vishnu : Hindu Culture in Historical Perspective: Hindu Culture in Historical Perspective. Oxford University Press. ISBN 978-0-19-971825-2.
- Kramrisch, Stella (1976). The Hindu Temple, Volume 1 & 2. Motilal Banarsidass. ISBN 81-208-0223-3.
- Pintchman, Tracy (2001). Seeking Mahadevi: Constructing the Identities of the Hindu Great Goddess. State University of New York Press. ISBN 978-0791450086.
- Leadbeater, Charles Webster (1927). The Chakras. Theosophical Publishing House (Reprinted 1972, 1997). ISBN 978-0-8356-0422-2.
- Madan, T. N. (1988). Way of Life: King, Householder, Renouncer : Essays in Honour of Louis Dumont. Motilal Banarsidass. ISBN 978-81-208-0527-9.
- Rocher, Ludo (1986). The Puranas. Otto Harrassowitz Verlag. ISBN 978-3447025225.
- Wood, Ernest and SV Subrahmanyam (1911). The Garuda Purana Saroddhara (of Navanidhirama). SN Vasu (Reprinted by AMS Press, 1974). ISBN 0-404578098.
