= R. N. Malhotra =

Indian banker (1926–1997)

Ram Narain Malhotra

17th Governor of the Reserve Bank of India
- In office 4 February 1985 – 22 December 1990
- Preceded by: Amitav Ghosh
- Succeeded by: S. Venkitaramanan

Personal details
- Born: 1926
- Died: 29 April 1997 (aged 70–71)
- Spouse: Anna Rajam Malhotra

Ram Narain Malhotra popularly known as R. N. Malhotra (1926 – 29 April 1997) was the seventeenth governor of the Reserve Bank of India (RBI), serving from 4 February 1985 to 22 December 1990.

Malhotra was a member of the Indian Administrative Service. He had served as Secretary, Finance, and as India's Executive Director of the International Monetary Fund before his appointment as governor of the RBI. During his tenure, the 500-rupee note was introduced. He signed the 8hq A 50 rupees note 1986. In 1990 he was the recipient of the Padma Bhushan award.

His wife Anna Rajam Malhotra was the first woman member of the Indian Administrative Service.
