= Bibek Debroy =

Indian economist (1955–2024)

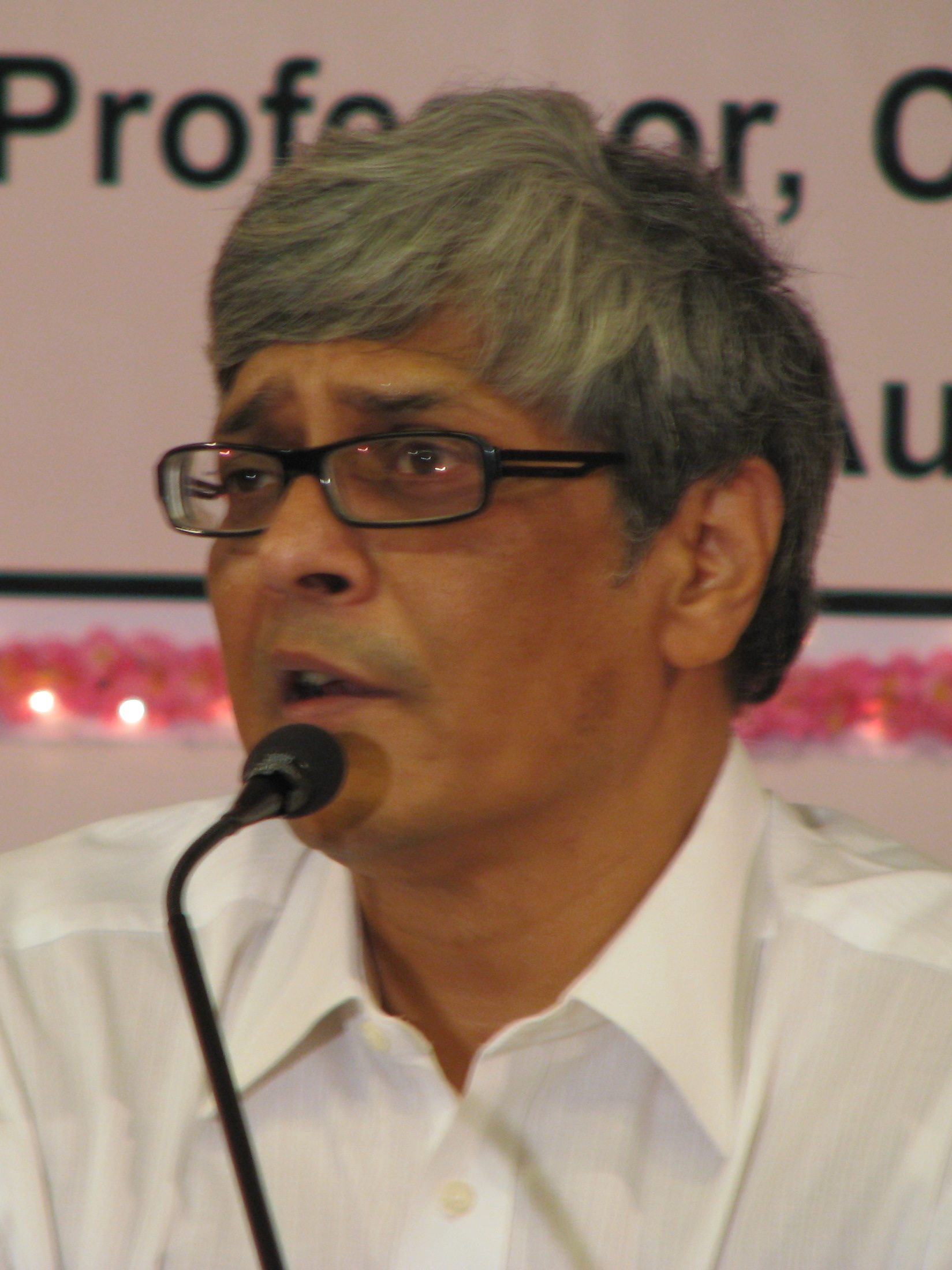
- Debroy in 2008
- Born: 25 January 1955; Shillong, Assam (now in Meghalaya), India
- Died: 1 November 2024 (aged 69); New Delhi, India
- Education: Presidency College; Delhi School of Economics; Trinity College, Cambridge
- Occupation: Economist
- Spouse: Suparna Banerjee
- Children: 2
- Awards: Padma Shri, Padma Bhushan

Bibek Debroy (25 January 1955 – 1 November 2024) was an Indian economist who chaired both the Indian Prime Minister's Economic Advisory Council and a Finance Ministry expert committee on infrastructure, contributing significantly to game theory, economic theory, and the study of income and social inequalities, law reforms and railway reforms. From 2015 until 2019, Debroy was a member of an Indian government think tank known as NITI Aayog. He was also a prolific translator of major Sanskrit works — including the Rāmāyaṇa, the Mahābhārata and several Purāṇas — into English.

Debroy's magnum opus, Inked in India, co-authored with Sovan Roy, is a comprehensive catalogue of India's fountain pen, nib, and ink manufacturers.

India awarded him Padma Shri, the fourth-highest civilian honour, in 2015 and, posthumously, Padma Bhushan, the third-highest civilian honour, in 2025.

He received Lifetime Achievement awards from the US-India Business Summit in 2016 and from the Australia India Chamber of Commerce (AICC) in 2022.

In February 2024, Debroy was conferred an Insolvency Law Academy emeritus fellowship, in recognition of his leadership, public service work and contributions to the insolvency field.

Debroy died on 1 November 2024, at the age of 69, a month after his admission to All India Institutes of Medical Sciences in New Delhi.

== Early life ==
Debroy was born in Shillong, Assam (now in Meghalaya), on 25 January 1955. His grandparents had migrated from Pail, Habiganj in Sylhet, now in Bangladesh; his paternal grandfather and his father migrating as late as 1948. His father went on to join the Indian Audit and Accounts Service.

Bibek Debroy began his schooling at Ramakrishna Mission Vidyalaya, Narendrapur. Although he was keen to study physics at Presidency College, Kolkata, his father persuaded him to pursue economics instead. He graduated in economics from Presidency College and went on to earn a master's degree in economics from the Delhi School of Economics.

He subsequently moved to the University of Cambridge on a scholarship from Trinity College, where he pursued doctoral research under the guidance of the noted British economist Frank Hahn. His research focused on incorporating information into a general equilibrium framework. He was awarded an MSc degree by Cambridge before returning to India.

== Career ==
=== Economics ===
Debroy's earlier positions included director of Rajiv Gandhi Institute for Contemporary Studies, consultant to the Department of Economic Affairs of Finance Ministry (India), and director of the project LARGE (Legal Adjustments and Reforms for Globalising the Economy), set up by the Finance Ministry and United Nations Development Programme (UNDP) to examine legal reforms in India. Between December 2006 and July 2007, he was the rapporteur for implementation in the Commission on Legal Empowerment of the Poor. Debroy authored several books, papers and popular articles, was consulting editor of Indian financial newspapers, and was a member of the National Manufacturing Competitive Council (2004 to 2009). He chaired a Jharkhand state committee to recommend a state development plan. He has been a Member of the Chief Minister's Economic Advisory Council in Rajasthan.

From 2014 to 2015, he chaired a Ministry of Railways committee set up to restructure Indian Railways. Debroy had also taught at Presidency College, Calcutta, Gokhale Institute of Politics and Economics, the Indian Institute of Foreign Trade and the National Council of Applied Economic Research.

From January 2015 till June 2019, he was a permanent member of NITI Aayog (National Institution for Transforming India Aayog), which replaced the former Planning Commission to act as an Indian government think tank.

In September 2017, he was appointed Chairman of the Economic Advisory Council to the Prime Minister, and from September 2018 to September 2022, was President of the Indian Statistical Institute. In September 2022, he was appointed Chancellor of Pune’s Deccan College Post-Graduate and Research Institute. In July 2024, Debroy was also appointed the Chancellor of the Gokhale Institute of Politics and Economics, where he served till September 2024. Debroy was a Reader (Associate Professor) in Economics at Centre for the Study of East European Economies, Gokhale Institute of Politics and Economics, Savitribai Phule Pune University, from March 1983 to March 1987.

=== Literature and media ===
Debroy translated the unabridged Mahābhārata into English, in a series of 10 volumes. He has also translated the Bhagavad Gita, the Harivamsa, the Vedas and Valmiki's Rāmāyaṇa (in three volumes). He has translated the Bhagavata Purana (in three volumes), the Brahma Purana (two volumes), the Shiva Purana (three volumes), the Brahmanda Purana (two volumes) and the Vishnu Purana, Markandeya Purana and Kurma Purana (one volume each).

He was the first person since Manmatha Nath Dutt to have translated the Mahabharata and the Ramayana, both in unabridged form, into English. For his translations, he was conferred the R. G. Bhandarkar Memorial Award in July 2023 by the Bhandarkar Oriental Research Institute (BORI). He also wrote The Illustrated Mahabharata by Penguin Random House.

The reception by experts in the popular press has been generally favourable. Business Standard, reviewing his translation of Ramayana, admired Debroy's lucidity and addition of explanatory footnotes. Arshia Sattar, reviewing the same work for The Indian Express, applauded his translation of the two major Sanskrit epics and praised his introduction to the text as well as literal translation; notwithstanding the relatively poor scholarly apparatus vis-à-vis Goldman, Debroy's was held to be more compact and accessible. Hindustan Times, reviewing the translation of Mahabharata, commended his academic-like rigour and passion; it spoke favourably of Debroy's choice of words—modernised yet true to the Sanskrit source, and sprinkling of mathematical details in notes. According to a review of Shiva Purana in News18, Bibek Debroy's translation of the Shiva Purana is lauded by Open Magazine.

The review in The Sunday Guardian of Debroy's recent work, "Life, Death and the Ashtavakra Gita," praises the book for successfully combining Bibek Debroy's literal translation of the Ashtavakra Gita with Hindol Sengupta's personal reflections.

In contrast, Willis Goth Regier, director of the University of Illinois Press, found Debroy's translation of Ramayana to be poor and lacking, inferior to that of Robert P. Goldman.

==== Media ====
Debroy anchored Itihasa, a show telecasted on Sansad TV, the official channel of Parliament of India. The series is a journey to discover what is "Bharata", what it means to be "Bhartiya" and what it means in terms of India's Sanatana Sanskriti.

== Bibliography ==
=== Economics ===
- India: Redeeming the Economic Pledge, Academic Foundation, 2004 <https://web.archive.org/web/20110707075705/http://www.academicfoundation.com/n_detail/debroy.asp>.
- Transforming West Bengal, Changing the Agenda for an Agenda for Change, jointly with Laveesh Bhandari, February 2009 <https://web.archive.org/web/20101218180830/http://indicus.net/media/index.php/2009/1324-transforming-west-bengal-changing-the-agenda-for-an-agenda-for-change>.
- India Labour Report 2008 – The Right to Rise: Making India's Labour Markets Inclusive," jointly with Laveeesh Bhandari, TeamLease Services, 2009 <https://web.archive.org/web/20101221105636/http://teamlease.com/images/reports/TeamLease_LabourReport2008.pdf>.
- India Labour Report 2009 – The Geographic Mismatch & A Ranking of Indian States by their Labour Ecosystem, jointly with Laveesh Bhandari, TeamLease Services, 2010 <https://web.archive.org/web/20101221103929/http://teamlease.com/images/reports/TeamLease_LabourReport2009.pdf>.
- Economic Freedom of the States of India 2011, Academic Foundation, 2011, jointly with Swaminathan Aiyar and Laveesh Bhandari <http://www.cato.org/economic-freedom-india/>.
- The India Mosaic – Searching for an Identity, Academic Foundation and Rajiv Gandhi Institute for Contemporary Studies, Delhi, 2004, jointly edited with D. Shyam Babu <https://web.archive.org/web/20110707075717/http://www.academicfoundation.com/n_detail/imosaic.asp>.
- Agenda for Improving Governance, Academic Foundation and Rajiv Gandhi Institute for Contemporary Studies, Delhi 2004 <https://web.archive.org/web/20110707075729/http://www.academicfoundation.com/n_detail/agenda.asp>.
- Integrating the Rural Poor into Markets, India Development Foundation and International Development Enterprises, Academic Foundation, Delhi 2004 <https://web.archive.org/web/20110707075844/http://www.academicfoundation.com/n_detail/Rpoor.asp>.
- Small-Scale Industry in India, Large Scale Exit Problems, jointly edited with Laveesh Bhandari, Academic Foundation, Friedrich Naumann Stiftung and Rajiv Gandhi Institute for Contemporary Studies, 2004 <https://web.archive.org/web/20110707075859/http://www.academicfoundation.com/n_detail/SSI-LSEP.asp>.
- Energizing Rural Development through Panchayats, jointly edited with P.D. Kaushik, Academic Foundation and Rajiv Gandhi Institute for Contemporary Studies, 2004.
- Reforming the Labour Market, jointly edited with P.D. Kaushik, Academic Foundation and Rajiv Gandhi Institute for Contemporary Studies, 2004 <https://web.archive.org/web/20110707075909/http://www.academicfoundation.com/n_detail/Refo_L.asp>.
- Uses and Misuses of Anti-Dumping Provisions in World Trade, A Cross-Country Perspective, jointly edited with Debashis Chakraborty, Academic Foundation and Rajiv Gandhi Institute for Contemporary Studies, 2006 <https://web.archive.org/web/20110707075921/http://www.academicfoundation.com/n_detail/antidump.asp>.
- The Trade Game, Negotiation Trends at WTO and Concerns of Developing Countries, jointly edited with Debashis Chakraborty, Academic Foundation and Rajiv Gandhi Institute for Contemporary Studies, 2006 <http://www.academicfoundation.com/n_detail/tradeGame.asp Archived 7 July 2011 at the Wayback Machine>.
- Judicial Reforms in India, Issues and Aspects, Rajiv Gandhi Institute for Contemporary Studies and Academic Foundation, 2007, jointly edited with Arnab Kumar Hazra <https://web.archive.org/web/20110707075943/http://www.academicfoundation.com/n_detail/jreforms.asp>.
- Anti-Dumping, Global Abuse of a Trade Policy Instrument, jointly edited with Debashis Chakraborty, Liberty Institute and Academic Foundation, 2007 <https://web.archive.org/web/20110707080007/http://www.academicfoundation.com/n_detail/antiD-GA.asp>.
- India Health Report 2010, edited with Ajay Mahal and Laveesh Bhandari, Indicus Analytics and Business Standard Books, 2010 <http://www.business-standard.com/books/books.php?lmnu=m1&sub=11&val=11>.
- Corruption in India – The DNA and the RNA, jointly with Laveesh Bhandari, Konark Publishers, 2011, ASIN B006MAADEU
- Gujarat: Governance for Growth and Development, Academic Foundation, 2012. https://books.google.com/books?id=4iCuNAEACAAJ&q=gujarat+growth+for+governance+and+development
- Economic Freedom of the States of India, 2012, jointly with Laveesh Bhandari, Swaminathan S. Anklesaria Aiyar and Ashok Gulati, Academic Foundation, 2013.
- Getting India Back on Track: An Action Agenda for Reform, jointly with Ashley Tellis and Reece Trevor, Carnegie Endowment,
- Meghalaya, On the Paths to Prosperity, 2014, Aakhya Media Services, ISBN 978-81-929512-1-8, https://web.archive.org/web/20150710215729/http://www.aakhyamedia.com/index.php/product/meghalaya/
- Footprints ... The Story of Chhattisgarh, 2016, Aakhya Media Services, ISBN 978-81-929512-5-6
- India 2047, Voices of the Young, edited, 2017, Academic Foundation, ISBN 978-93-327-0390-2, http://academicfoundation.org/index.php?route=product/product&product_id=821
- Indian Railways, The Weaving of a National Tapestry, jointly with Sanjay Chadha and Vidya Krishnamurthi, Portfolio/Penguin, 2017, ISBN 978-0-14-342675-2, https://web.archive.org/web/20170129164338/http://penguin.co.in/book/uncategorized/indian-railways/
- India @ 70, Modi @ 3.5, Capturing India's transformation under Narendra Modi, jointly edited with Ashok Malik, Wisdom Tree, 2017, ISBN 978-81-8328-498-1
- Ideas for India, Faster, Higher, Stronger, Wisdom Tree, 2017, ISBN 978-81-8328-500-1
- On the Trail of the Black, Tracking Corruption, jointly edited with Kishore Arun Desai, Rupa Publications, 2017, ISBN 978-81-291-4922-0, http://rupapublications.co.in/books/on-the-trail-of-the-black-tracking-corruption/
- Making of New India, Transformation Under Modi Government, jointly edited with Anirban Ganguly and Kishore Desai, Wisdom Tree, 2019 (ISBN 978-81-8328-531-5).
- The Railway Chronicles, Synergy Books India, 2019 (ISBN 978-93-82059-83-7).
- Reason and Reform, How Policy Reforms have Shaped India, jointly with Diwakar Jhurani, Academic Foundation, New Delhi, 2021, ISBN 978-93-3270-540-1
- MODI 2.0: A Resolve To Secure India, jointly edited with Ranjit Pachnanda, Anirban Ganguly & Uttam Kumar Sinha, Pentagon Press, New Delhi, 2021, (ISBN 978-93-9009-542-1, http://www.pentagonpress.in/book_details.aspx?this=15121
- Inked in India: Fountain Pens and a Story of Make and Unmake, jointly with Sovan Roy, Rupa, 2022 ISBN 978-93-5520-564-3
- At the Intersection of Law and Life, Essays in Honour of Justice M. N. Venkatachaliah, jointly edited with Sameer Kochhar, Oakbridge Publishing, 2023, ISBN 978-9395764490.
- Modi: Energising a Green Future, jointly edited with R K Pachnanda, Anirban Ganguly & Uttam Kumar Sinha, Pentagon Press, 2023, ISBN 978-9390095872.

=== Indology and others ===
- Some Aspects of the Ramayana and the Mahabharata, 1990, South Asia Books. ISBN 978-8171690084.
- Sarama and Her Children, The Dog in Indian Myth, Penguin, 2008 <http://www.penguinbooksindia.com/category/Non_Fiction/Sarama_and_Her_Children_9780143064701.aspx>.
- The Bhagavad Gita for You, Har-Anand, 2012.
- Ujjain – The Land of Simhastha, 2015, Aakhya Media Services, https://web.archive.org/web/20160328223203/http://www.aakhyamedia.com/index.php/shop/
- The Book of Limericks, Penguin, 2018, https://penguin.co.in/book/poetry/the-book-of-limericks/
- Manmatha Nath Dutt, Translator Extraordinaire, Rupa, 2020 (ISBN 978-9389967012), http://rupapublications.co.in/books/manmatha-nath-dutt-translator-extraordinaire/
- The Bhagavad Gita for Millennials, Rupa, 2020 (ISBN 978-93-90260-38-6), https://rupapublications.co.in/books/the-bhagavad-gita-for-millennials/
- Navaratri: When Devi Comes Home, jointly edited with Anuradha Goyal, Rupa, 2021, ISBN 93-5520-045-5
- Devi for Millennials, Rupa, 2022, ISBN 978-93-5520-785-2
- Life, Death and the Ashtavakra Gita, jointly with Hindol Sengupta, Grin Publishing, 2024, ISBN 978-81-9497-013-2, https://www.grinmedia.in/product-page/life-death-and-the-ashtavakra-gita
- Sacred Songs: The Mahabharata's Many Gitas, Rupa, 2023, ISBN 978-93-5702-509-6.

=== Major unabridged translations ===
The following books were all published by Penguin.

- Bhagavad Gita, a translation, 2006; reprinted as The Bhagavad Gita, 2019, ISBN 978-0670093151.
- Mahabharata, 2010-2014, 6,088 pp.; 10 vols. — Vol. 1, ISBN 9780143100133; Vol. 2, ISBN 9780143100140; Vol. 3, ISBN 9780143100157; Vol. 4, ISBN 9780143100164; Vol. 5, ISBN 9780143100171; Vol. 6, ISBN 9780143100188; Vol. 7, ISBN 9780143100195; Vol. 8, 2013. ISBN 9780143100201; Vol. 9, ISBN 9780143422914; Vol. 10, ISBN 9780143422921.
- Harivamsha, 2016; 441 pp.; ISBN 9780143425984.
- Valmiki Ramayana, 2017, 1,536 pp.; 3 vols., ISBN 978-0143441144.
- Bhagavata Purana, 2019, 1,500 pp.; 3 vols. — Vol. 1, ISBN 978-0143428015; Vol. 2, ISBN 978-0143428022; Vol. 3, ISBN 978-0143428039.
- Markandeya Purana, 2019, ISBN 978-0143448259.
- Brahma Purana, 2021; 2 vols. — Vol. 1, ISBN 978-0-14-345489-2; Vol. 2, ISBN 978-0-14-345490-8.
- Vishnu Purana, 2022, ISBN 978-0-14-3456865.
- Shiva Purana, 2023, 3 vols. — Vol. 1, ISBN 978-0-14-3459699; Vol. 2, ISBN 978-0-14-3459705; Vol. 3, ISBN 978-0-14-3459712.
- Brahmanda Purana, 2024, 2 vols. — Vol. 1, ISBN 978-0-14-3465287; Vol.2, ISBN 978-0-14-3465294.
