= S. Venkitaramanan =

Indian civil servant and former Governor of Reserve Bank of India (1931–2023)

18th Governor of the Reserve Bank of India
- In office 22 December 1990 – 21 December 1992
- Preceded by: R. N. Malhotra
- Succeeded by: C. Rangarajan

Personal details
- Born: Sri Venkitaramanan; 28 January 1931 Nagercoil, Tamilnadu, India
- Died: 18 November 2023 (aged 92) Chennai, Tamil Nadu, India
- Education: University College Thiruvananthapuram; Carnegie Mellon University

Sri Venkitaramanan (28 January 1931 – 18 November 2023) was an Indian civil servant and economist who served as the 18th governor of the Reserve Bank of India between 1990 and 1992, where he oversaw India's actions to tide over the balance of payments crisis. His actions were noted to have helped the country out of the crisis when its foreign-exchange reserves had almost depleted and helped usher in the country's economic liberalisation programme in the early 1990s.

He earlier served as the finance secretary in India's Ministry of Finance, from 1985 to 1989.

== Early life ==
Venkitaramanan was born on 28 January 1931 in the town of Nagercoil in Padmanathapuram division of the princely-state of Tamilnadu into a Tamil Iyer family.

Venkitaramanan completed his master's degree in physics from University College Thiruvananthapuram, Kerala, and also obtained a master's degree in Industrial Administration from Carnegie Mellon University, Pittsburgh, US.

== Career ==
Venkitaramanan was a member of the Indian Administrative Service. He was posted with the Government of India and with the state of Tamilnadu at various times. He also served the Government of Karnataka as adviser. In the late 1960s, he served as the private secretary to Indian politician and food minister, Chidambaram Subramaniam, while ushering in India's green revolution.

Venkitaramanan served as Finance Secretary in the Ministry of Finance with the Government of India for four years from 1985 to 1989, under the Rajiv Gandhi government. He briefly served as an advisor to the Government of Karnataka when the state was under President's rule. He later served as the 18th Governor of the Reserve Bank of India for two years between 1990 and 1992. At the time of his appointment as RBI Governor, India was in the midst of a balance of payments crisis, with fast-depleting foreign exchange reserves. It is noted that while he had no economics training, he was selected for this position given his familiarity with the balance of payments situation. His actions as the Governor were noted to have contributed to India's tiding over the crisis. Specifically, during this time, the country adopted the International Monetary Fund's stabilization program and started on its economic liberalization program, including devaluation of the Indian rupee. During this time, he partnered with the then finance minister, Manmohan Singh, in implementing some of the reforms and also engaged with international multilateral agencies and other central banks towards raising foreign exchange for the country.

He was also the RBI Governor during 1992 Indian stock market scam also sometimes referred to as the Harshad Mehta scam, after the principal accused. The incident was called a failure of the country's securities markets.

After retirement, Venkitaramanan served as the Chairman of Ashok Leyland Investment Services Ltd., New Tirupur Area Development Corporation Ltd. and Ashok Leyland Finance Ltd. He also served in the boards of Reliance Industries Limited, SPIC, Piramal Healthcare Ltd, Tamil Nadu Water Investment Co. Ltd and Housing Development Finance Corp. Ltd.

== Personal life ==
Venkitaramanan was married and had two daughters. One of his daughters, Girija Vaidyanathan, was a 1981 Tamil Nadu cadre Indian Administrative Service officer who served as the Chief Secretary of Tamil Nadu between 2016 and 2019.

Venkitaramanan died on 18 November 2023, at the age of 92.

== Published works ==
- S, Venkitaramanan (2005). Indian Economy: Reviews And Commentaries - Vol.III. ICFAI University Press. ISBN 978-81-7881-573-2.
- S, Venkitaramanan (2003). Indian Economy: Reviews And Commentaries - Vol.II. ICFAI University Press. ISBN 978-81-7881-161-1.
- S, Venkitaramanan (2003). Indian Economy: Reviews And Commentaries - Vol.I. ICFAI University Press. ISBN 978-81-7881-146-8.
- S, Venkitaramanan (1998). Dilemmas of Development: The Indian Experience. Gokhale Institute of Politics and Economics.

== In popular culture ==
- Actor Anant Mahadevan portrayed Venkitaramanan in Scam 1992, a Sony Liv's original web series based on the 1992 Indian stock market scam of Harshad Mehta.
- In the film Governor, the RBI Governor was portrayed by Manoj Bajpayee as A. Ramanan, inspired by S. Venkitaramanan, the 18th Governor of the RBI.
