= Deccan (disambiguation) =

Deccan refers to the Deccan Plateau, a peninsular plateau in southern India, and southern India in general.

Deccan may also refer to:

== Places ==
- Deccan Gymkhana, a sports neighborhood in Pune, India
- East Deccan dry evergreen forests, forests in the Indian states of Andhra Pradesh and Tamil Nadu

== Events ==
- Deccan Riots, peasant revolt against moneylenders in colonial India
- Deccan Famine of 1630–32, a in early-modern India where some 2,000,000 people died

== Airlines ==
- Air Deccan, an Indian regional airline that existed from 2017 to 2020
- Deccan Charters, an airline based in Bangalore, India
- Simplifly Deccan, formerly Air Deccan, the first Indian low-cost carrier, headquartered in Bangalore
- Deccan 360, also known as Deccan Cargo & Express Logistics, a cargo airline based in Bangalore
- Deccan Airways, an airline based in Hyderabad from 1945 to 1953
- Deccan Lanka, a low-cost Sri Lankan airline based in Colombo

== Organisations ==
- Deccan Mujahideen, an alleged terrorist group in India
- Deccan States Agency, an administrative unit in British India
- Deccan sultanates, Muslim kingdoms ruling southern India during 15th-17th centuries

== Railways ==
- Deccan Odyssey, a train traveling from Mumbai to several locations in Maharashtra and Goa
- Deccan Queen, a daily train traveling between Mumbai and Pune

== Newspapers ==
- Deccan Chronicle, an Indian English-language newspaper
- Deccan Herald, an Indian English-language newspaper
- The Deccan Times, defunct Indian newspaper

== Other uses ==
- Deccan Traps, the remnants of one of the world's largest volcanic events
- Deccan white carp (Cirrhinus fulungee), a species of freshwater cyprinid fish
- Deccan Chargers, a defunct T20 cricket team in the Indian Premier League, 2008–2012

== See also ==
- Deccan College (disambiguation)
- Deccan Park (disambiguation)
- Deccani (disambiguation)
- Decan (disambiguation)
