= Parasakthi (2026 film) =

Indian film by Sudha Kongara

- Theatrical release poster
- Directed by: Sudha Kongara
- Screenplay by: Sudha Kongara; Arjun Nadesan; Ganeshaa
- Dialogues by: Sudha Kongara; Arjun Nadesan; Madhan Karky; Shan Karuppusamy
- Story by: Mathimaran Pugazhendhi
- Produced by: Aakash Baskaran
- Starring: Sivakarthikeyan; Ravi Mohan; Atharvaa; Sreeleela
- Cinematography: Ravi K. Chandran
- Edited by: Sathish Suriya
- Music by: G. V. Prakash Kumar
- Production company: Dawn Pictures
- Distributed by: Red Giant Movies
- Release date: 10 January 2026
- Running time: 162 minutes
- Country: India
- Language: Tamil
- Budget: ₹140−150 crore
- Box office: ₹85−100 crore (Note: Parasakthi's reported worldwide grosses vary between ₹84 crore (The Economic Times) – ₹100 crore (The Indian Express) – ₹50 crore (Filmfare))

Parasakthi (transl. The Supreme Power) is a 2026 Indian Tamil-language political action drama film directed by Sudha Kongara and produced by Aakash Baskaran of Dawn Pictures. The film stars Sivakarthikeyan, Ravi Mohan, Atharvaa and Sreeleela (in her Tamil debut). Set mainly in 1964, it follows two brothers protesting the promotion of Hindi as India's national language, but face threats from a brutal Intelligence Bureau officer.

Initially, Sudha and Suriya were set to collaborate after Soorarai Pottru (2020). The project, tentatively titled Suriya 43, was announced in October 2023 but was later shelved. Sudha then revived the script with Sivakarthikeyan, and the revived project was announced in December 2024 under the tentative title SK25, (Note: Referring to Sivakarthikeyan's 25th film as a lead actor.) while the official title was announced the following month. Principal photography commenced the same month and wrapped in October 2025, taking place in Chennai, Chidambaram, Karaikudi, Madurai, Colombo and Pollachi. The film has music composed by G. V. Prakash Kumar, cinematography handled by Ravi K. Chandran and editing by Sathish Suriya. It faced numerous controversies before release, including rights issues over the title Parasakthi, funds used in financing the film, and plagiarism allegations.

Parasakthi was released in theatres on 10 January 2026, during the Pongal week. The film received mixed reviews from critics and underperformed at the box office, grossing between ₹85 crore (US$9.1 million) – ₹100 crore (US$11 million) against a production budget of ₹140 crore (US$15 million)-₹150 crore (US$16 million).

== Plot ==
In 1959, the Purananuttru Padai ("Purananuru Army") – a radical student outfit opposed to the promotion of Hindi as India's national language – blocks and burns a train after deboarding its passengers. Among the passengers is Thirunaadan ("Thiru"), a KGB-trained Indian Intelligence Bureau officer. Hoping to capture the group, Thiru fights their leader Chezhiyan but ends up losing part of a finger. As for the outfit, one of Chezhiyan's friends dies in the fire. Heartbroken by the loss, Chezhiyan ceases the group's activities.

Five years later, Chezhiyan becomes a steam locomotive fireman to support the education of his younger brother Chinnadurai ("Chinna"), an engineering student at Annamalai University in Chidambaram. Initially, Chinna is carefree and playful, detached from politics. However, observing the injustices faced by the general public (such as an elderly woman being unable to use the Hindified money order service) makes him a committed member of the Purananuttru Padai, despite Chezhiyan's dissuading.

The brothers' contrasting paths eventually converge as they come to a shared understanding of what they are fighting for: not merely opposition to a policy, but the protection of self-respect, access, and cultural identity for future generations after Chezhiyan is rejected from the fireman steam engine job due to not having the Hindi accent and witnesses a similar person burn to death the way his friend did because he was unable to write UPSC due to not knowing Hindi, the language the question paper was in.

Chinna and his friends then lead a protest in front of the police station only to be shot by the police on Thiru's orders as a helpless Chezhiyan watches and Thiru then personally kills the wounded Chinna by kicking him into the sewage waters after he has Chezhiyan be arrested by the police to be interrogated. Chezhiyan is saved by Thiru's assistant, after revealing he assisted to the death of Chezhiyan's friend and understand his combat. Thiru later kills his assistant.

Meanwhile, Chezhiyan meets the I & B Minister and finds an arrangement on the question of the Hindi imposition, that is a vote by many Indians about it around the country. The solution gets successful countrywide. However, Thiru runs an operation to stop the revolutionary group. Despite that, Chezhiyan and his group, including old members from earlier years, still manage to take the situation on control. In a climatic fight with Chezhiyan in which Thiru dies from his wounds after a train wreck, the votes come to safety and the rules are changed.

== Cast ==
Adapted from the closing credits:

- Sivakarthikeyan as Chezhiyan "Che"
- Ravi Mohan as Thirunaadan "Thiru"
- Atharvaa as Chinnadurai "Chinna"
- Rana Daggubati as Michael Reddy (cameo appearance)
- Dhananjaya as Sharifa (cameo appearance)
- Basil Joseph as Oomen Chakko (cameo appearance)
- Sreeleela as Ratnamala
- Prakash Belawadi as the Chief Minister of Madras State
- Sandhya Mridul as the I & B Minister (Note: Although it is clear that Mridul played Indira Gandhi, her character is only credited as the I & B Minister.)
- Anand as MP Bhaskar Rao
- Kaali Venkat as Thambiraja Mill Owner
- Kulappulli Leela as Muthammal
- Prithvi Rajan as Vaigarai
- Sujata Sehgal as Thiru's mother
- Chetan as C. N. Annadurai
- Guru Somasundaram as M. Karunanidhi
- Dev Ramnath as Ibrahim Kamal IPS
- Papri Ghosh as Bindya Das
- Sandhya Mridul as Indira Gandhi

== Production ==
=== Development ===
In late October 2021, reports claimed that actor Suriya, director Sudha Kongara and music composer G. V. Prakash Kumar would collaborate for the second time after Soorarai Pottru (2020). The following January, Suriya confirmed their reunion. Initially conceived as a biographical film inspired by true events, the project was delayed due to their respective commitments to Kanguva (2024) and Sarfira (2024), the Hindi remake of Soorarai Pottru. Discussions resumed in mid-2023 under the tentative title Suriya 43, as it would be the actor's 43rd film as leading actor. Jointly produced by Suriya's 2D Entertainment and Sudha's Meenakshi Cinemas, the companies made a public announcement on 26 October, confirming the lead cast and revealing a part of the title as Purananooru. Cinematographer Jomon T. John confirmed joining the crew few days after the announcement.

In March 2024, after the project was reported to have been shelved, Sudha denied those claims and stated that she needed more time for the film's pre-production, that resulted in the delay of its shooting. However, the following July, Suriya was reported to have left the film, and Sivakarthikeyan was in consideration as his replacement. Production was reported to commence after the latter completed his commitments, Madharaasi (2025) and SK24. Aakash Baskaran's Dawn Pictures, a recently established production house, announced the project, tentatively titled SK25, on 14 December, confirming the project, and the official title Parasakthi was announced on 29 January 2025. Made on a budget of ₹150–250 crore, Sivakarthikeyan was reported to receive ₹50 crore (US$5.3 million) as his remuneration. However, along with Sudha, he reportedly decided to take the revenue sharing model to benefit the film's production; as per basis, they would receive an advance and a major portion of the profits would be received as their remuneration. Sudha wrote the script, screenplay and dialogues with Arjun Nadesan, with additional dialogues provided by Madhan Karky and Shan Karuppasamy. Professor Dr. A. Ramasamy served as the script consultant.

=== Pre-production ===
Pre-production began in May 2024, and was completed after six months. A muhurat puja was held at Chennai in early November 2024 with the presence of the film's cast and crew. During a test shoot, which was reportedly held in early December in Chennai, Sivakarthikeyan who was requested by Sudha to remove his beard was reported to have denied to do so and left the film. Soon after, however, the team shot the promotional teaser for the film and completed within few days.

In mid-December 2024, Ravi K. Chandran was announced as cinematographer, in his first film with Sudha and Sivakarthikeyan. Prakash Kumar would score the music, in his third consecutive film with the director. Sudha further retained her norm technicians, including editor Sathish Suriya, production designer Bindiya Chhabria, art director Karthick, and stunt choreographer Supreme Sundar. Actor Dev Ramnath, besides appearing in a prominent role, also served as the creative producer of the film.

=== Casting ===
Following the first announcement of the film, Suriya was reported to lose weight for his character in the film as a college student. Dulquer Salmaan was reportedly brought on board the cast in July 2022, while his inclusion was confirmed after a year, in July 2023. The following September, Nazriya Nazim was reported to be a part of the cast, in her first Tamil film after Thirumanam Enum Nikkah (2014). The same month, Vijay Varma, Ajay Devgn and Aditi Shankar were reportedly a part of the cast, with Varma being reported to play the lead antagonist role. Madhavan, who acted with Suriya in Aayutha Ezhuthu (2004), was also reported to reunite with him, playing a primary role. Nazriya and Varma's presence were confirmed in October. Soon after Suriya reportedly left the project, Sivakarthikeyan was reported to sport three different looks for his character.

In November 2024, Ravi Mohan or Vishal were reportedly in consideration for playing the antagonist; Vishal, however, denied the reports. Sreeleela further replaced Nazriya as the female lead, while also making her debut in Tamil. Atharvaa was reported to be cast in the role originally offered to Dulquer. Ravi, Sreeleela and Atharvaa's presence in the film was confirmed by the production house in mid-December 2024. Sreeleela went through a workshop for three months to learn Tamil for her character as she, per the producer, was used to commercial films and not a period film. Sudha later said that Suriya left due to his inability to commit continuously as required. Chetan plays the politician C. N. Annadurai, and took help from S. S. Stanley, who played Annadurai in Periyar (2007). The film features cameo appearances by Malayalam actor Basil Joseph, Telugu actor Rana Daggubati and Kannada actor Dhananjaya; Sudha said their casting was to represent the different linguistic regions of South India. Abhishek Bachchan too had been considered for a cameo but this idea was discarded as Sudha felt too many cameos would dilute the film's narrative. She also said she initially wanted Vijay Deverakonda in Daggubati's role, but Devarakonda could not accept due to scheduling conflicts with Kingdom (2025).

=== Filming ===
Principal photography began with the first schedule on 14 December 2024 at Binny Mills in Chennai. Sequences involving Sivakarthikeyan and Ravi were reportedly shot first during this schedule. Aakash Baskaran stated that filming would be shot extensively in and around Tamil Nadu and would be completed by June or July. He also stated that they had already shot two songs composed by Prakash Kumar, during the first schedule. The second schedule commenced on 6 February at Annamalai University in Chidambaram, in where fans of Sivakarthikeyan gathered and posted pictures of the actor in social media. Atharvaa also joined the sets during this schedule. In late February, production moved to Karaikudi. The third schedule took place at Karaikudi Stores.

Sequences featuring Sivakarthikeyan and Prithivi Rajan were shot on 20 February. Later that month, Sudha stated that they soon after moved to Meenakshi Temple at Madurai and completed the schedule by 26 February. A few days later, during the launch of a restaurant, Ravi stated that they would shoot the following schedule in Sri Lanka. Sivakarthikeyan arrived at Sri Lanka on 11 March for the concurrent schedule, which took place on 12 March at Colombo. During this schedule, the team erected sets which resembled Madurai Junction railway station and Delhi, for major sequences. Guru Somasundaram joined the production in this schedule. In mid-March, Ravi and Basil Joseph began filming their portions of the schedule. Basil Joseph's presence at the sets confirmed his inclusion in the film.

The makers had completed filming the portions and returned to Chennai in early April. However, some of the production workers, who were looking after the works, were reportedly stuck in Sri Lanka. The production company of the film, Dawn Pictures, was reported to have not paid the company that arranged the shooting in Sri Lanka the expenses that incurred. Therefore, the company reportedly took the passports of the workers. Despite this, the fifth schedule commenced on 6 April at East Coast Road, where sequences set in Madurai were reportedly shot. During this schedule, an action sequence, choreographed by Supreme Sundar, was filmed featuring Sivakarthikeyan. The actor shot the sequence without a stunt double, and suffered a sprained right arm, but still finished shooting that day. He was reportedly told by doctors to take bed rest for a week, while Sudha shot other sequences in the meantime. The following month, Sivakarthikeyan began filming for Madharaasi in Colombo. Sudha stated the same month that only 40 days of filming were remaining and would be completed after the actor completed filming for Madharaasi. On 18 July, filming resumed in Pollachi. Sreeleela and Daggubati were present during this schedule. On 21 October, principal photography wrapped.

== Music ==
The soundtrack is composed by G. V. Prakash Kumar, in his 100th film as a music composer. The music rights were acquired by Saregama. Three singles were released from November 2025 to December 2025. The audio launch was held on 3 January 2026.

== Marketing ==
The film's teaser trailer was released on 29 January 2025, revealing the title Parasakthi. The second promotional poster released the following day hinted at it being an anti-Hindi imposition film. On 18 December, the makers opened The World of Parasakthi, a 1960s-themed exhibition in Valluvar Kottam to allow visitors to see what Tamil Nadu was like in that era. The exhibition ran until 28 December. The film's trailer was released on 4 January 2026.

== Release ==
=== Theatrical ===
Parasakthi released theatrically on 10 January 2026, during the week of Pongal. It was also dubbed in Telugu under the same name. The film was distributed by Red Giant Movies in Tamil Nadu. It was also screened at the 55th International Film Festival Rotterdam.

The theatrical release was advanced by four days from its initial date of 14 January 2026 following discussions with exhibitors and distributors. Media coverage noted that the revised release date resulted in a direct box-office clash with actor-politician Vijay's film Jana Nayagan during a politically charged period in Tamil Nadu, though Aakash Baskaran maintained that the decision was purely logistical. The eventual postponement of Jana Nayagan from 9 January gave Parasakthi a possible leeway to succeed. The film received a U/A certificate from the censor board after 25 cuts and modifications, only one day before the scheduled release date. Sivakarthikeyan said that the makers, unwilling to miss the release date, assented to the suggested changes and had they had more time, could have negotiated with the board, though he felt the changes ultimately did not affect the storyline.

=== Home media ===
The film began streaming on ZEE5 from 7 February 2026.

== Reception ==
=== Critical response ===
Parasakthi received mixed reviews from critics.

Roopa Radhakrishnan of The Times of India gave 3.5 out of 5 stars and wrote "Parasakthi is nowhere near flawless. But it's a powerful and ambitious attempt to capture a defining chapter in history. In every sense, the film wears its politics on its sleeve and brings in an emotional heft." Janani K of India Today gave 2 out of 5 stars and wrote "Parasakthi is an emotionally and politically strong film that captures the fight of our ancestors and reminds us of the fight that we need to carry for the next generation. Director Sudha Kongara delivers a relevant period drama that resonates with contemporary India, even if the execution falters in places."

Anandu Suresh of The Indian Express gave 1.5 out of 5 stars and wrote "Parasakthi is, without doubt, an extremely important and pertinent movie in the current sociopolitical environment, offering a reminder that history has a tendency to repeat itself [...] The major shortcoming in the script is its lack of flow, with each scene feeling disjointed from the ones before and after [...] While Parasakthi attempts to present itself as a docu-fiction at times, the efforts to clarify that it is more fiction than documentary have, unfortunately, backfired, weakening its essence moment by moment." Siddarth Muralidharan of Frontline wrote "What distinguishes Parasakthi is its willingness to stage a language agitation not as allegory or background story but as the central dramatic question, forcing viewers to reckon with the politics of Hindi imposition head-on". Raisa Nasreen of Times Now rated the film 1.5 out of 5 stars and noted "For viewers who enjoy period dramas with political undertones, Parasakthi may work—at least in parts".

Anusha Sundar of OTTPlay rated the film 1.5 out of 5 stars and stated "The sentiments are drawn purely out of the themes that the film touches up, and misses on generating efforts that would make it little more personal. Parasakthi feels distanced albeit its decadency and honesty." Saibal Chatterjee of NDTV gave 1.5 out of 5 stars and wrote "The core of Parasakthi is reminiscent of Mani Ratnam's 2004 Suriya-starrer Aayutha Ezhuthu, [...] Parasakthi is a watchable film mainly because the director and the lead actor work well in tandem and the evocative production design and the top- notch cinematography (by Ravi K. Chandran) enhance its texture and visual sheen." Prashanth Vallavan of Cinema Express gave 1.5 out of 5 stars and wrote, "Capturing one of the most important moments in modern Tamil history, Parasakthi struggles to leave an impact with its acute focus on a broader appeal, formulaic storytelling, apologetic tone, and cautious approach." Srinivasa Ramanujam of The Hindu wrote, "Parasakthi is the kind of film that not only raises awareness – the actual anti-Hindi imposition movement and its heroes are chronicled in the end – but also packs in the right elements of cinema to entertain today’s audiences."

=== Box office ===
Parasakthi collected ₹12 crore on its opening day. By early February 2026, the film experienced a heavy decline in box office collections on Day 22 of its theatrical run, reflecting the typical box office trajectory for films in extended release.

The film concluded its run with a worldwide gross estimated to be ₹54–60 crore and ended as flop movie.

== Controversies ==
=== Title disputes ===
Prior to the title's official reveal, it was leaked on social media platforms. K. Chandrasekaran, head of the Nadigar Thilagam Sivaji Samuga Nala Peravai, released a press statement objecting to the use of the title Parasakthi due to it being previously used for the 1952 Sivaji Ganesan-starrer Parasakthi. The statement further explained that the 1952 film created a revolution in Tamil cinema and is still praised for the dialogues written by M. Karunanidhi. The group ended their statement by requesting the makers of this film to change its title, or the fans would protest until it is done. Soon after the title's announcement, AVM Productions, the area distributors of the 1952 film, released a statement that the rights of the title Parasakthi was given by them to Dawn Pictures.

The same day of the title announcement, Vijay Antony released a statement saying he had registered the title Paraashakthi in July 2024 for his Tamil film Shakthi Thirumagan's dubbed Telugu version, as confirmed by the South Indian Film Chamber of Commerce. Dawn Pictures countered by revealing they held the rights to the title Parasakthi in both Tamil and Telugu, verified by the producers councils of the respective industries. On 30 January, both parties reached a mutual decision, wherein this film would keep its title as Parasakthi in Tamil and Telugu, while Shakthi Thirumagan would be titled Parashakthi in the dubbed Hindi, Kannada and Malayalam versions with a new title yet to be decided for the dubbed Telugu version. On 12 March 2025, it was announced that the dubbed Telugu version of Shakthi Thirumagan would be titled Bhadrakali.

A few days after Dawn Pictures and the makers of Shakthi Thirumagan found their mutual decision, National Pictures, producers of the 1952 film, dissuaded anyone from using the title Parasakthi as they still held the full rights to it, and were planning on re-releasing the film remastered for its 75th anniversary. They noted that AVM held the distribution rights of the 1952 film only in select areas.

=== Production dispute ===
Dawn Pictures came under scrutiny for funds used in producing the film. On 16 May 2025, the Enforcement Directorate (ED) conducted a search in the residence of Aakash Baskaran.

=== Plagiarism allegations ===
In December 2025, K. V. Rajendran, previously an assistant director on the film Pen Singam (2010), appealed to the Madras High Court seeking to ban the film, alleging it plagiarised his script Chemmozhi, based on the 1965 anti-Hindi agitation of Tamil Nadu, which he registered with the South Indian Film Writers' Association (SWAN) in 2010. The High Court sought a response from the makers of Parasakthi by 2 January 2026. On that date, the High Court refused to put a stay on the film's release, and instead adjourned the case to 8 January after P. S. Raman, representing Dawn Pictures, revealed that the filmmakers consulted with a surviving participant of the 1965 agitation while researching the subject. Rajendran later accused SWAN of inaction, but K. Bhagyaraj, the president of SWAN, retorted that Rajendran refused to share his script with them for cross-checking for potential similarities with Parasakthi, and instead privately filed a court case. However, Bhagyaraj noted receiving a letter mentioning SWAN as respondents, and that the association had already begun inspecting both scripts for similarities. In early February, Rajendran attempted to stop the streaming premiere, which was scheduled for 7 February, after having watched the film in theatre. His lawyer demanded he be given credit as "writer and original conceptualiser". In response, the lawyer representing the makers of Parasakthi said no one could claim copyright over the 1965 agitation as it was a historical event. The case was adjourned to 9 February.

=== Historical accuracy ===
Post release, the Tamil Nadu Youth Congress called for the film's banning, alleging historical inaccuracies, including the portrayal of the Indian National Congress and Indira Gandhi as slanderous. They demanded removal of the objected scenes and a public apology from the makers. In response, Sivakarthikeyan told ANI that if people actually saw the film fully they would understand its message.

=== Online harassment allegations ===
In January 2026, Sudha Kongara addressed online criticism and harassment faced by the Parasakthi team during the film's production and promotional phase. In an interview, she stated that the team had been subjected to “slandering” and “defamation” from anonymous social media accounts, and emphasised the need to respond to such attacks.
