= Simplifly Deccan =

Indian airline

IATA	ICAO	Call sign
DN	DKN	DECCAN
- Commenced operations: 25 August 2003; 23 years ago
- Ceased operations: 29 August 2008; 18 years ago
- Operating bases: Bangalore; Delhi; Kolkata; Mumbai
- Fleet size: 40 (in September 2007)
- Destinations: 52
- Parent company: United Breweries Group
- Headquarters: Bengaluru, Karnataka, India
- Key people: G. R. Gopinath, founder

Simplifly Deccan, formerly known as Air Deccan, was the first Indian low-cost carrier. Headquartered in Bengaluru, it operated domestic flights from seven base airports using a fleet of Airbus A320, ATR 42 and ATR 72 aircraft. The airline appealed to middle class travellers with low fares and a large route network. It employed several innovative methods to ensure the profitability of its business model. Nevertheless, Simplifly Deccan merged with Kingfisher Airlines in April 2008. Kingfisher replaced the Deccan brand with Kingfisher Red in August 2008.

== History ==
=== Air Deccan (2003–2007) ===
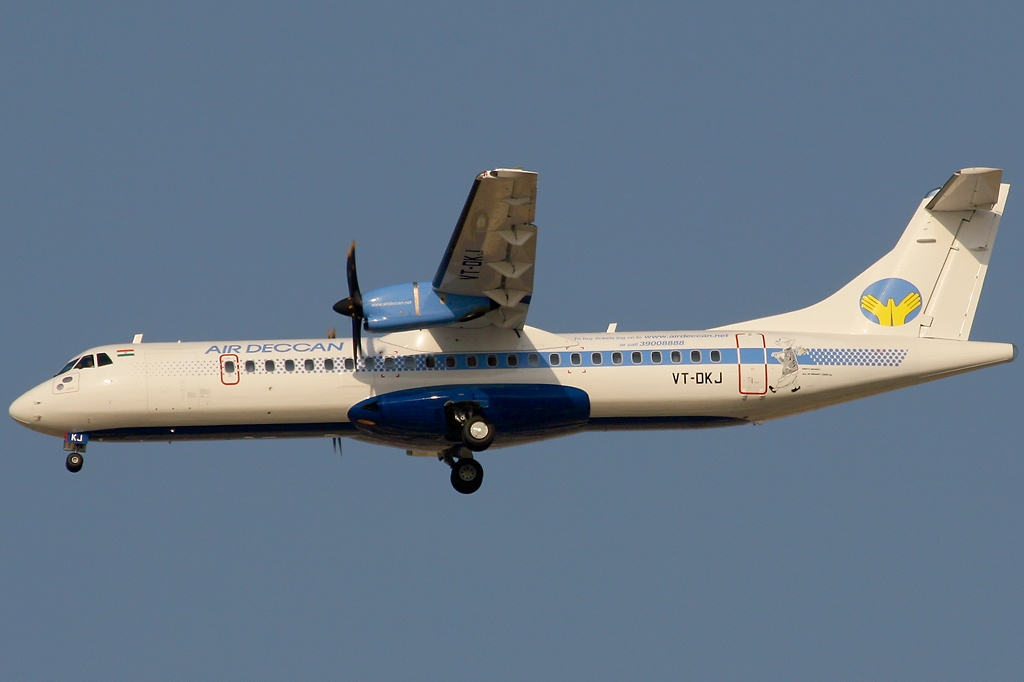
Air Deccan used ATR aircraft for regional destinations.

Simplifly Deccan was founded as Air Deccan by G. R. Gopinath, a retired Indian Army captain who had gained experience in the aviation industry through his Deccan Aviation venture. Air Deccan became a wholly owned subsidiary of Deccan Aviation. The airline launched operations on 25 August 2003 with a flight from Bengaluru to Hubbali. At that time, its fleet consisted of two ATR 42-320 aircraft. In order to increase capacity on its trunk routes, Air Deccan purchased two Airbus A320-200s and leased five in 2004. In December of that year, the airline purchased an additional 30 A320s in a US$1.8 billion order. It ordered 30 ATR 72-500s in February 2005.

The airline underwent rapid growth, witnessing 30% growth in its passenger numbers in 2005–2006. In 2006 it was the third largest airline in India with a 19% market share, flying to 55 destinations with 30 aircraft. It placed an order for 30 more Airbus A320s in December 2006. The airline experienced 42% growth in passenger traffic in 2006–2007, becoming the nation's second largest carrier in 2007. As it grew, other low-cost carriers emerged in the Indian market; SpiceJet, GoAir, IndiGo and JetLite were all launched between 2005 and 2007.

==== Low-cost strategy ====
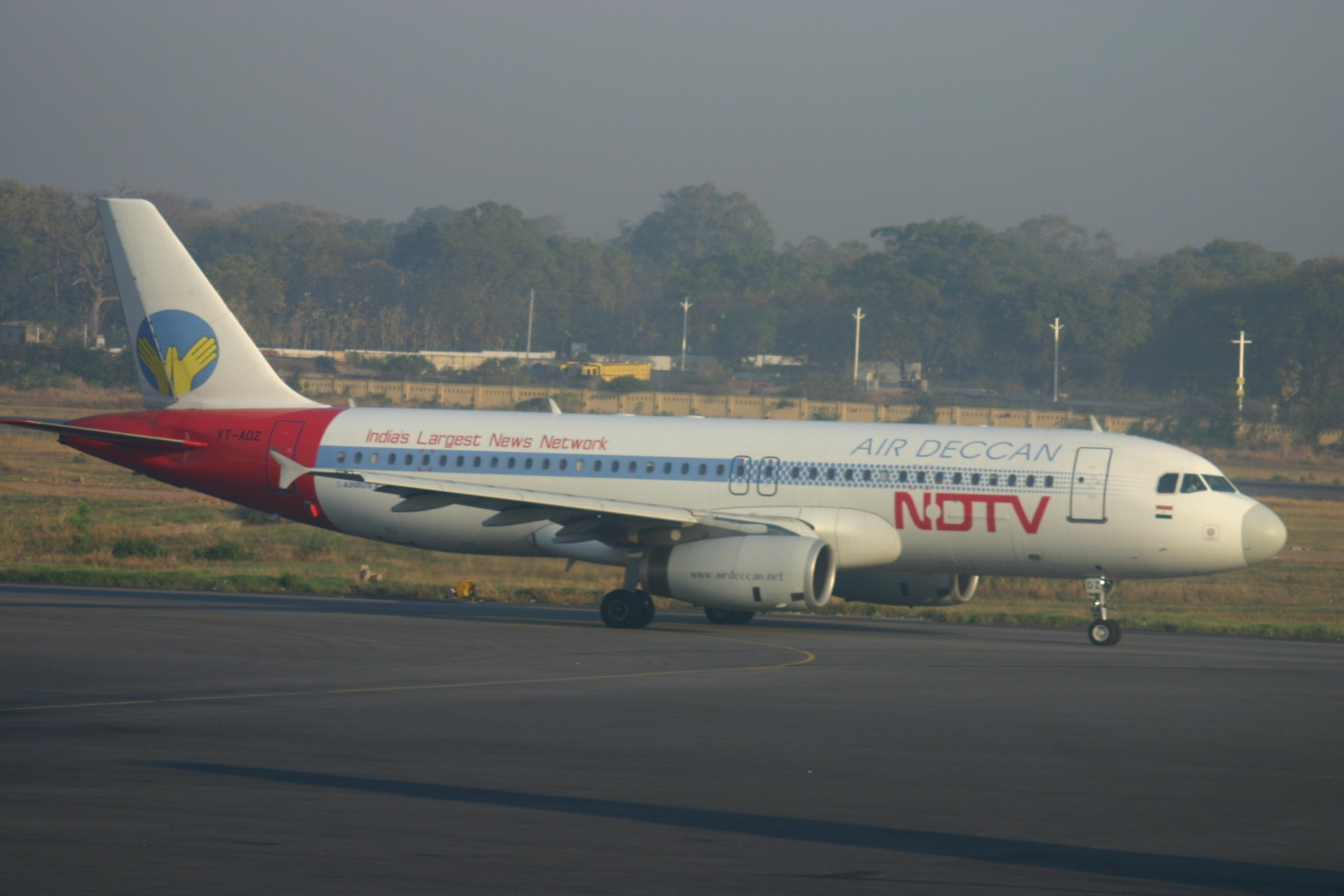
An Air Deccan Airbus A320 with NDTV advertising

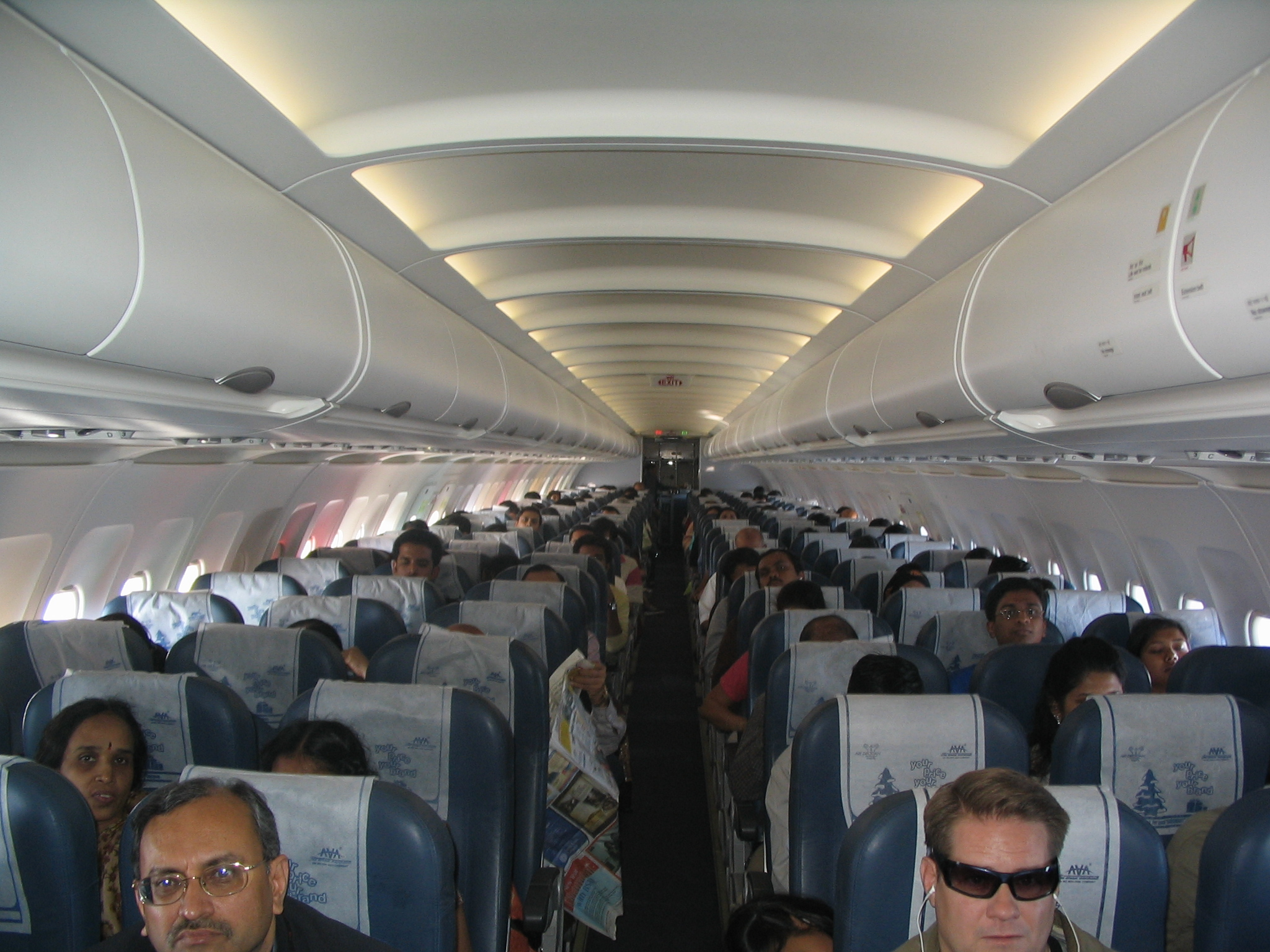
Interior of a Simplifly Deccan Airbus A320

Air Deccan was the first low-cost carrier in India. Launched amid a booming Indian economy and a growing middle class, the airline targeted middle class travellers with its low fares and extensive route network. Tickets cost around 30% less than those of full-service airlines and cost about the same as or less than first class rail tickets. Air Deccan focused on providing air service to underserved airports across the country, where competition was low and the airline could acquire a loyal customer base. G. R. Gopinath claimed he wanted to make air travel accessible to every Indian.

It is not the elite that I consider as my customers. It is the humble cleaning women of my office, the auto-rickshaw driver and other such people that we would like to cater to. We want them to dream that they too can fly, and we want to make that dream happen.

— G. R. Gopinath

The airline operated a single cabin class, economy, allowing it to pack more seats into its aircraft. Following its no-frills approach, it charged for all food and beverages served on board. Payment was also required for cancellations, and no refunds or accommodations were provided to passengers who had missed their flights.

Air Deccan operated a point-to-point route network from seven base airports. It maintained low turnaround times and often outsourced work to local airport employees, especially at airports that saw few Air Deccan flights and did not require dedicated employees throughout the day. Air Deccan also gained advertising revenue by allowing advertisements both inside and outside its aircraft. For reservations, the airline utilised multiple channels. Passengers could book tickets through travel agents, on the Internet or through call centres. Each of these channels was connected to a fully web-enabled reservation system, making Air Deccan the first in India to use such a system. Air Deccan also avoided the cost of printing tickets; passengers or travel agents were required to do so off the Internet.

=== Simplifly Deccan (2007–2008) ===
In early May 2007, rumours began to circulate that Vijay Mallya, founder of Kingfisher Airlines, was interested in buying Air Deccan. Gopinath dispelled the rumours, claiming "[Mallya and I] are from different planets; he is from Venus, I am from Mars". He believed it was impossible to merge the airlines' separate business models as Kingfisher was a full-service carrier. Nevertheless, negotiations began at the end of the month, and Kingfisher parent United Breweries Group purchased a controlling 26% stake in Deccan Aviation on 31 May. Gopinath had changed his mind upon understanding that the two airlines would continue to function independently. In addition, he needed to raise funds; Air Deccan had lost ₹213 crore (US$22 million) during the quarter ending 31 March 2007. Air Deccan was rebranded Simplifly Deccan in October 2007 and adopted Kingfisher's livery and flight attendant uniform.

In December 2007, the airlines announced that they would merge into a single corporate entity while maintaining separate brands. The airline business of Kingfisher Airlines Ltd was merged into Deccan Aviation Ltd on 1 April 2008. (Note: Kingfisher Airlines Ltd also operated a training and ground services business, which did not merge with Deccan Aviation Ltd.) The charter business of Deccan Aviation Ltd was spun off into a separate company known as Deccan Charters Ltd. The combined company utilized Simplifly Deccan's operating permit, allowing it to launch international flights in 2008; Simplifly Deccan would complete five years of operation that year. (Note: At the time, Indian civil aviation policy required an airline to complete five years of operation and maintain a fleet of at least 20 aircraft before beginning international routes.) Mallya introduced major changes to the Simplifly Deccan brand in order to reduce losses and improve the airline's reputation, which had declined because of poor on-time performance. He also wanted to give the airline a premium touch while it remained a low-cost carrier. Simplifly Deccan ended the practice of outsourcing check-in staff, lengthened turnaround times and stopped selling tickets at promotional fares.

Simplifly Deccan and Kingfisher continued to operate domestically with their own airline codes. Unless the airlines consolidated under a single set of codes, the Ministry of Civil Aviation required Kingfisher to use Deccan's codes on international routes; Mallya, on the other hand, wanted to use Kingfisher's codes. On 29 August 2008, both airlines started using Kingfisher's codes. Simplifly Deccan also migrated to Kingfisher's reservation system and was renamed Kingfisher Red.

== Corporate affairs and identity ==
Former logo

Through the merger with Kingfisher Airlines, Simplifly Deccan became a subsidiary of United Breweries Group. Headquarters were located on Cunningham Road in Bengaluru, the capital of Karnataka.

=== Livery ===
Simplifly Deccan adopted the livery of Kingfisher Airlines following the merger. The tail, engines and underside were painted red, and the kingfisher bird logo was applied to the tail. The former livery consisted of a fading blue cheatline and, on the tail, a blue circle with two yellow hands joined at the thumb like the wings of a bird. The airline's mascot, R. K. Laxman's The Common Man, was often incorporated into the old livery. It was chosen in May 2005 to emphasise Simplifly Deccan's goal of making air travel more accessible.

== Destinations ==
At the time it ceased operations, Simplifly Deccan flew to 52 destinations across India. It had bases at seven Indian cities: Ahmedabad, Bengaluru, Chennai, Delhi, Hyderabad, Kolkata, Mumbai. The airline opened a base at Thiruvananthapuram in April 2006; however, it ended flights to the airport in early 2008. (Note: Thiruvananthapuram was listed in Simplifly Deccan's flight schedule effective 28 October 2007 to 29 March 2008, but it was not listed in the final schedule effective 30 March to 25 October 2008.)

== Fleet ==
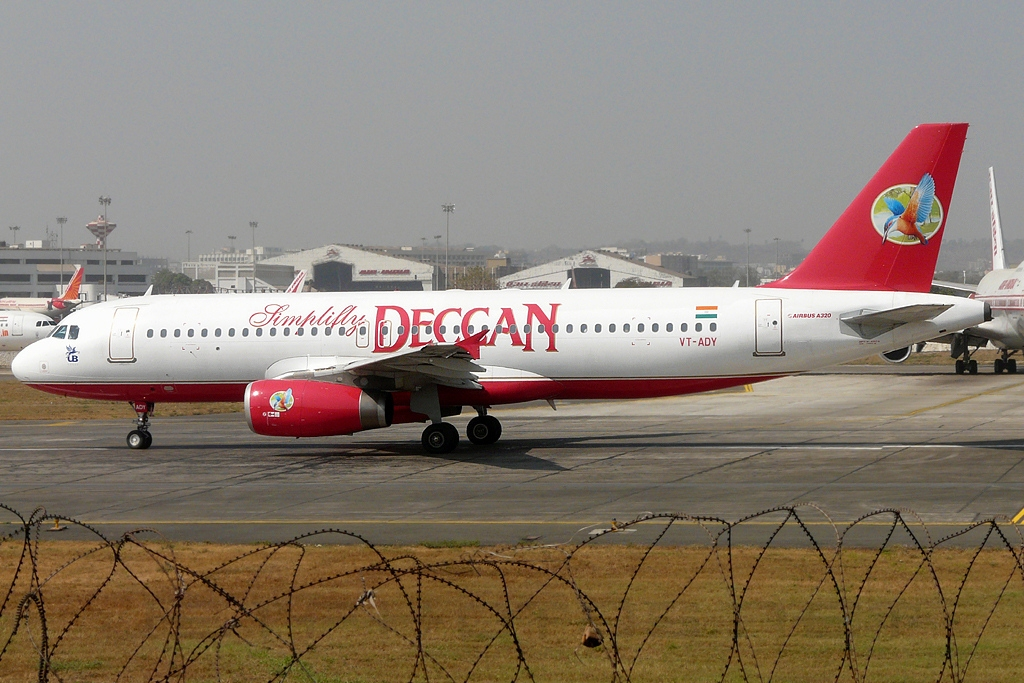
A Simplifly Deccan Airbus A320 taxiing at the Mumbai airport in March 2008

Simplifly Deccan operated a fleet of ATR 42, ATR 72 and Airbus A320 aircraft. For routes of higher demand between major cities, Simplifly Deccan used its larger Airbus A320s.

Simplifly Deccan was operating the following aircraft in September 2007:

Simplifly Deccan fleet
Aircraft	In service	Passengers (Economy)	Notes
Airbus A320	22	180	—
ATR 42	10	48	—
ATR 72	8	72	—
Total	40		

== Incidents ==
In 2003, on the planned launch flight from Begumpet airport, Hyderabad to Vijayawada, having onboard guests including Pratap Reddy, M Venkaiah Naidu, Pankaj Abani and other political leaders, one of the engines caught fire while taxiing for takeoff and the flight was aborted. All passengers survived the incident.

On 11 March 2006, Air Deccan Flight 108 made a hard landing and skidded off runway 27 at HAL Airport in Bengaluru. The aircraft was an ATR 72-500 registered VT-DKC flying between Coimbatore and Bengaluru. Five passengers received minor injuries, and the aircraft suffered major damage to its undercarriage. The airport was closed for almost five hours following the incident. In the end, the aircraft was sold to be used for spares.

== Legal issues ==
Accessibility in Transport

Significant legal challenges have shaped the accessibility of air travel in India. In 2006, activists Subrata Pramanick and Rajiv Ranjan filed a landmark complaint (Case No. 3197/2006) against Deccan Aviation (Air Deccan) before the Court of the Chief Commissioner for Persons with Disabilities. The case challenged the airline's practice of charging a "wheelchair tax" of ₹500 for mobility assistance. This litigation, cited in the company's 2006 SEBI prospectus, contributed to the eventual mandate that all Indian carriers provide wheelchair assistance to passengers with disabilities free of charge under Civil Aviation Requirements (CAR).

== In popular culture ==
Soorarai Pottru, a Tamil-language film starring Suriya, directed by Sudha Kongara was inspired by the initial events of Air Deccan and its founder Cpt. G. R. Gopinath. The film was also remade in Hindi as Sarfira by the same director, starring Akshay Kumar and Radhika Madan in the lead role.

== Bibliography ==
- Balasubramanian, S. (2007). The Art of Business Leadership: Indian Experiences. Delhi: SAGE Publications. ISBN 9788178299747.
- Giriprakash, K. (2014). The Vijay Mallya Story. Penguin Books. ISBN 9789351186229.
- Gross, Sven; Lück, Michael, eds. (2016). The Low Cost Carrier Worldwide. Routledge. ISBN 9781317025054.
- Kazmi, Azhar (2008). Strategic Management and Business Policy (3rd ed.). Delhi: Tata McGraw-Hill. ISBN 9780070263628.
- Mahadevan, B (2007). Operation Management: Theory and Practice. Delhi: Dorling Kindersley (India). ISBN 9788177585643.
- Sampler, Jeffrey (2006). Air Deccan (PDF) (Report). Massachusetts Institute of Technology.
- Swaminathan, Jayashankar (2009). Indian Economic Superpower: Fiction Or Future?. Singapore: World Scientific Publishing. ISBN 9789812814661.
