= Deccan 360 =

Airline

IATA	ICAO	Call sign
3C	DEC	DECCAN CARGO
- Founded: 2009; 17 years ago
- Ceased operations: May 2011; 15 years ago
- Hubs: Bengaluru International Airport, Bangalore
- Fleet size: 2
- Destinations: 15
- Parent company: Deccan Aviation
- Headquarters: Bangalore, Karnataka, India
- Key people: G.R. Gopinath
- Website: www.deccanexpress.in

Deccan 360, also known as Deccan Cargo & Express Logistics, was a cargo airline based in Bangalore, India.

== History ==
Deccan 360 began operations in November 2009. The company was founded by Captain G. R. Gopinath, former owner of Air Deccan, which he sold to Kingfisher Airlines. Deccan 360 began with three Airbus A310 cargo planes and five ATR cargo aircraft, but the Airbuses had maintenance issues and were often grounded. Deccan returned the planes to the lessor in May 2011 and suspended operations in the same month.

The company was renamed Deccan Cargo and Express Logistics Pvt. Ltd.(DCEL) in 2007–2008, and has been ordered to wind up by the Karnataka High Court in a recent order based on petitions – one filed by Dubai-based United Aviation Services (UAS) and another by M/s Patel Integrated Logistics (PIL) Pvt. Ltd. – seeking recovery of amounts due to them by winding up the company.

== Destinations ==
Deccan 360 previously served the following.

- Hong Kong
  - Hong Kong International Airport
- India
  - Ahmedabad - Sardar Vallabhbhai Patel International Airport
  - Bangalore - Bengaluru International Airport (hub)
  - Chennai - Chennai International Airport
  - Cochin - Cochin International Airport
  - Trivandrum - Trivandrum International Airport
  - Coimbatore - Coimbatore International Airport
  - Delhi - Indira Gandhi International Airport
  - Guwahati - Lokpriya Gopinath Bordoloi International Airport
  - Belgaum - Belgaum Airport
  - Hubballi/Dharwad - Hubli Airport
  - Kolkata - Netaji Subhash Chandra Bose International Airport
  - Mumbai - Chhatrapati Shivaji International Airport
  - Nagpur - Dr. Ambedkar International Airport
- United Arab Emirates
  - Dubai - Dubai International Airport

== Fleet ==
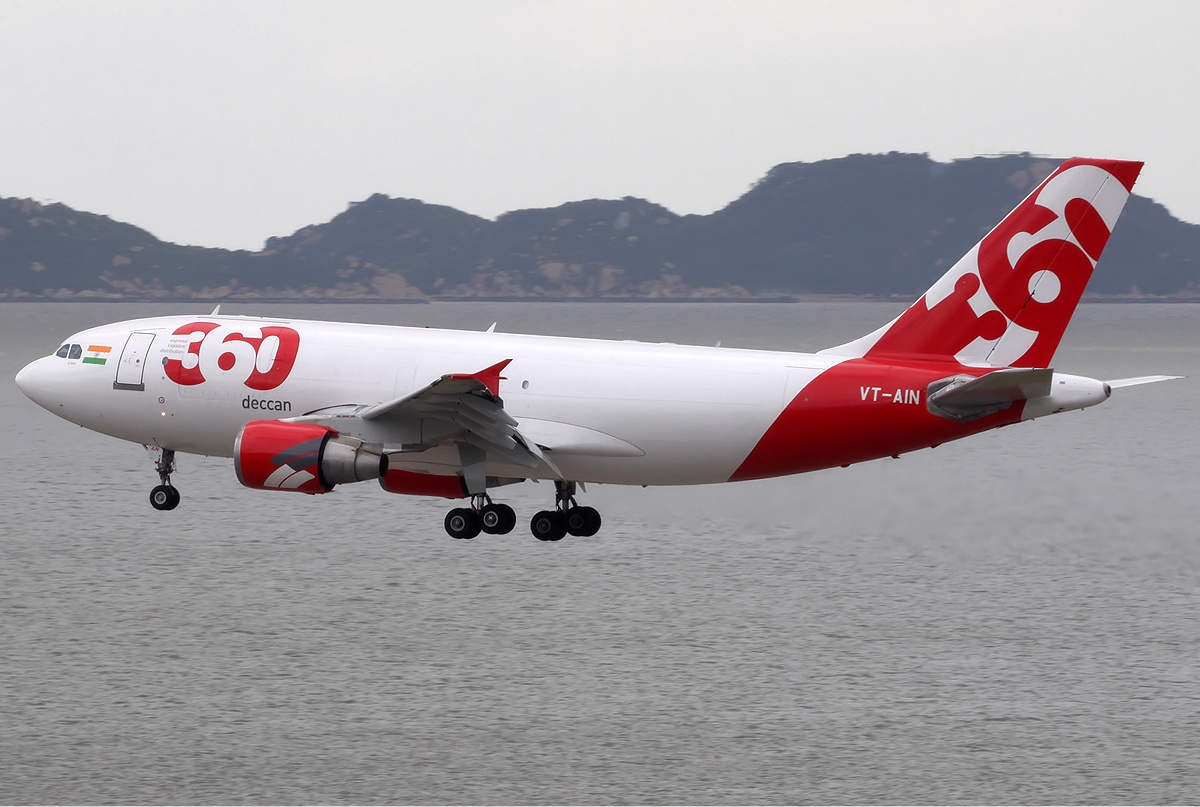
Airbus A310-300F of Deccan 360

Deccan 360 fleet included the following aircraft as of December 2012:

Deccan 360 Fleet
Aircraft	In service	Orders	Capacity	Routes	Registration
ATR 72-202F	2	0		Domestic	VT-DEA, VT-DEB
Total	2	0			

=== Previous types operated ===
- 1 ATR 42-300F
- 3 Airbus A310-300F
