= Deccani =

Deccani (also Dakhini, Dakhni or Dekhani) is anything related to the Deccan region of India. Specifically, it may be:

- Deccani language, an Indo-Aryan language spoken in southern India, closely related to Urdu
  - Deccani Muslims, speakers of Deccani
  - Deccani film industry, Deccani-language film industry based in Hyderabad, India
  - Deccani Masnavi, collection of poetry in Deccani
- Deccani painting, a style of Indian painting
- Deccani Marathi, a dialect of the Marathi language
- Deccani architecture, Indian architectural style

== See also ==
- Deccan (disambiguation)
- Deccan sultanates, sultanates in medieval-India
- Hyderabadi Muslims, Muslims from Hyderabad, India and surrounding regions, of which the Deccani Muslims form a sub-group
