= Drohi (2010 film) =

- Theatrical release poster
- Directed by: Sudha Kongara Prasad
- Written by: Sudha Kongara Prasad
- Produced by: Mano Akkineni
- Starring: Srikanth; Vishnu Vishal
- Cinematography: Alphonse Roy
- Edited by: A. Sreekar Prasad
- Music by: V. Selvaganesh
- Production company: Indira Innovations
- Release date: 10 September 2010
- Country: India
- Language: Tamil

Drohi (transl. Traitor/Cheat) is a 2010 Indian Tamil-language crime action film written and directed by Sudha Kongara Prasad in her Tamil debut. The film stars Srikanth, Vishnu Vishal, Poorna and Poonam Bajwa in lead roles. The music was composed by V. Selvaganesh with cinematography by Alphonse Roy and editing by A. Sreekar Prasad. The film was released on 10 September 2010.

== Plot ==
Sami Srinivasan and his friend Karunakaran grow up in the Royapuram slums and attend the same school. Karuna is rough and tough, while Sami is naïve. They are close buddies. Once, they see their class teacher Roja being brutally murdered before their eyes by a gangster. Dejected at local police not taking any action, Karuna kills the gangster but gets caught by the cops. Sami tells the police that Karuna committed the murder. Though both are bailed out of trouble, enmity brews between them. As years roll by, hatred increases.

As fate would have it, a twist occurs: the two characters switch roles. Sami, who was naïve as a child, becomes a rowdy and the right-hand man of local gangster Narayanan as an adult. In contrast, Karuna, who was very violent and brutal in his childhood, becomes an honest and brave police officer who gets posted in the same locality as an adult. Sami is still against Karuna. Trouble erupts when Sami loves Karuna's sister Malar. In the meantime, Shruthi loves Karuna. What happens between the two forms for the rest of the film.

== Cast ==
- Srikanth as Sami Srinivasan
  - Veyil Vasanth as Young Sami
- Vishnu Vishal as Karunakaran
  - Kishore DS as Young Karuna
- Poorna as Malar
  - Sophia as Young Malar
- Poonam Bajwa as Shruthi and Lochani (Voice Dubbed By Actress Urvashi)
- Thiagarajan as Narayanan
- Tanikella Bharani as Nanaji
- Manobala as HM
- Srinivasa Moorthi as Sami's father
- Meera Krishnan as Sami's mother
- S. N. Lakshmi as Roja's grandmother
- Mime Gopi as Gaana Babu
- Rajeevan as Police
- Cuckoo Parameswaran as Esakiyamma
- Jaya Rao as Elancheziyan
- Thennavan as Police
- Rail Ravi as SI
- Bipin as Councillor
- Maran as Market Rowdy
- Pooja Umashanker as Roja (Guest appearance)
- S. P. B. Charan as Venkat (Guest appearance)
- Rachana Maurya as item number
- Arun Matheswaran

== Soundtrack ==
The music was composed by V. Selvaganesh. The audio launch was held on 11 August 2010.

Track listing
No.	Title	Singer(s)	Length
1.	"Sama Sama Yama Yama"	Silambarasan, Tippu, Karthik, Maya
2.	"Konjam Konjam Vendum"	Ranina Reddy, Srikanth
3.	"Adi Kutti Maa"	Ranjith, KK, Suchithra Karthik, Maya Sricharan
4.	"Sambhavaami Yuge Yuge"	Shankar Mahadevan, Naveen, Faraz
5.	"Vaalaatum Rowdy Kuttam"	Sowmya Rao, Maya Sricharan
6.	"Drohi Theme"	Bigg Nikk, Maya Sricharan, Raam

== Critical reception ==
Malathi Rangarajan of The Hindu wrote, "Intelligent storyline and appealing performances are pluses. It has its share of minuses, but this Drohi doesn't betray". Bhama Devi Ravi of The Times of India wrote, "The simmering enmity and the constant one-upmanship is handled deftly by the debutant director. However, when she introduces child sexual abuse into the melting pot of friendship, rivalry and romance, the story somewhat slackens and the numerous twists and turns lose their edginess. But it picks up towards the end, and as they say, all is well that ends well". Pavithra Srinivasan of Rediff.com wrote, "As a debut film [sic], Drohi has its strengths. If it had managed to move from the shadow of Mani Ratnam, it would have been even better".
