= 2D Entertainment =

Indian film studio

- Type: Private
- Industry: Motion picture
- Founded: 2013
- Founder: Suriya
- Headquarters: Chennai, India
- Key people: Suriya; Jyothika; Karthi; Rajsekar Pandian
- Products: Film production Film distribution Record producer
- Website: 2D Entertainment

2D Entertainment is an Indian film production and distribution company established by Suriya in 2013. Other key people involved are Rajsekar Pandian, Suriya's wife, Jyothika, and Suriya's younger brother, Karthi. The company was named by the starting letter of Suriya's children, Diya and Dev.

== Filmography ==
=== Films produced ===
Year	Title	Director(s)	Cast	Producer(s)	Synopsis	Ref.(s)
2015	36 Vayadhinile	Roshan Andrews	Jyothika, Rahman, Abhirami, Amritha Anil	Suriya	A wife decides to rediscover herself and pursue her creative interests after her husband and daughter leave her to emigrate to Ireland.	
2015	Pasanga 2	Pandiraj	Nishesh, Vaishnavi, Suriya, Amala Paul, Bindu Madhavi, Vidya Pradeep	Suriya, Pandiraj	Two hyperactive, young children and their parents struggle to fit into the norms of school life but a doctor helps change their attitudes.	
2016	24	Vikram Kumar	Suriya, Samantha, Nithya Menen	Suriya	The evil brother of a scientist hopes to steal his brother's time-travel device, in order to make himself immortal.	
2017	Magalir Mattum	Bramma	Jyothika, Urvashi, Bhanupriya, Saranya	Suriya, Christy Siluvappan	Three female school friends reunite after thirty-eight years, despite the pressures put upon them by the men in their lives.	
2018	Kadaikutty Singam	Pandiraj	Karthi, Sayyeshaa, Sathyaraj, Priya Bhavani Shankar, Arthana Binu	Suriya	Gunasingam, in spite of being the son of the landlord, still works as a farmer. His life revolves around his large family and relatives and he loves them ardently. The family is disappointed when they get to know that he has fallen in love with the beauty of the village, Iniya, instead of marrying either of his two nieces which leads to problems in Gunasingam's life and family.	
2019	Uriyadi 2	Vijay Kumar	Vijay Kumar, Sudhakar, Vismaya	Suriya	A young man struggles for justice for the victims who are affected by the chemical plant leakage which lead to many deaths in the village.	
2019	Jackpot	Kalyaan	Jyothika, Revathi	Suriya	Two con women lock horn with a gangster after knowing that a mystic vessel is hidden in his home.	
2020	Ponmagal Vandhal	J. J. Federick	Jyothika, K. Bhagyaraj, R. Parthiban	Suriya, Jyothika	A rookie lawyer leads to the reopening of a notorious 15-year-old case of a dead psycho killer, alleged to have kidnapped and murdered little girls.	
2020	Soorarai Pottru	Sudha Kongara	Suriya, Aparna Balamurali, Urvashi	Suriya, Jyothika, Guneet Monga	Nedumaaran Rajangam, a former air force captain takes on the airline industry with the help of his friends and family.	
2021	Raame Aandalum Raavane Aandalum	Arisil Moorthy	Vani Bhojan, Ramya Pandian	Suriya, Jyothika	A villager's search for his two lost bulls turns into an expose of the corruption in politics and media.	
2021	Udanpirappe	Era. Saravanan	Jyothika, M. Sasikumar Samuthirakani, Soori, Kalaiyarasan, Nivedhithaa Sathish	Suriya, Jyothika	A woman hopes for the reunion of two families caught in the ideological battle between her righteous but hot-headed brother and her law-abiding husband.	
2021	Jai Bhim	T. J. Gnanavel	Suriya, Lijomol Jose, Prakash Raj, K. Manikandan, Rajisha Vijayan	Suriya, Jyothika	A pregnant woman from a primitive tribal community, searches desperately for her husband, who is missing from police custody. A High Court advocate rises in support to find her husband and seek justice for them.	
2022	Oh My Dog	Sarov Shanmugam	Arun Vijay, Vinay Rai, Mahima Nambiar, Arnav Arun Vijay	Suriya, Jyothika	Young Arjun rescues a blind Siberian Husky puppy and decides to train him for a competition with his father and grandfather.	
2022	Viruman	M. Muthaiah	Karthi, Aditi Shankar, Rajkiran, Soori, Prakash Raj, Saranya Ponvannan	Suriya, Jyothika	An intrepid and good-hearted son fights to make his arrogant father pay the price for his sins, which includes his mother's death, and save his brothers from the man's grip.	
2024	Sarfira	Sudha Kongara	Akshay Kumar, Radhika Madan	Suriya, Jyothika, Vikram Malhotra	A former air force captain takes on the airline industry with the help of his friends and family.	
2024	Meiyazhagan	C. Prem Kumar	Karthi, Arvind Swamy	Suriya, Jyothika	Beautiful Bond between two brother in law.	
2025	Retro	Karthik Subbaraj	Suriya, Pooja Hegde	Karthik Subbaraj, Karthekeyan Santhanam, Kalyan Subramaniam, Suriya, Jyothika	Paarivel "Paari" Kannan, an orphan raised by a gangster, faces betrayal and a violent cult as he searches for his true origins, fulfils a prophecy, and tries to reunite with his lost love, Rukmini.	
2026	Scene	Jithu Madhavan	Suriya, Nazriya Nazim, Naslen, Lal	Jyothika, Suriya, Jaishree Damodaran	TBA	

=== Films distributed ===
- Singam 2 (2013)
- Kadugu (2017)
- Sillu Karupatti (2019)
- Gargi (2022)
- My Lord (2026)

=== Film soundtracks produced ===
- Kadugu (2017)
- Magalir Mattum (2017)

== Awards ==
64th National Film Awards

- Best Cinematography at 64th National Film Awards for DOP Tirru for 24 (2016)
- Best Production Design at 64th National Film Awards for Subrata Chakraborthy, Shreyas Khedekar, Amit Ray for 24 (2016)

10th South Indian International Movie Awards

- Best Film-Tamil for Soorarai Pottru (2020)

68th National Film Awards

- Best Actor - Suriya for Soorarai Pottru
- Best Actress - Aparna Balamurali for Soorarai Pottru
- Best Feature Film - Suriya, Jyothika and Guneet Monga for Soorarai Pottru
- Best Music Direction (Background Score) - G. V. Prakash Kumar for Soorarai Pottru
- Best Screenplay - Sudha Kongara for Soorarai Pottru
