= Krishnakumar Balasubramanian =

Indian film and stage actor

- Occupations: Actor; art director
- Years active: 2010-present

Krishnakumar Balasubramanian is an Indian actor and art director who predominantly works in Tamil cinema.

== Career ==
=== Film ===
Krishnakumar made his debut playing the lead role in the film Kadhalagi (2010).

Later in 2020, he played a pivotal role in Soorarai Pottru as a friend of actor Suriya's character.

In 2024, he gained further recognition and critical acclaim after portraying Lord Krishna in Nag Ashwin's science fiction film Kalki 2898 AD.

=== Theater ===
Krishnakumar is the artistic director of The Little Theatre Group. He has scripted and directed many stage plays, namely the Christmas pantomimes Alice in iLand (2011) and The Free Musketeers (2012); and the musicals Atita (2010) and Gapsaa - Fully Loaded (2012) for the Little Festival, an international theater festival for young audiences.

He was also the theater director of Kalakshetra Foundation's dance theater production on the occasion of Mahatma Gandhi's 150th birthday celebration "Shanthi Sutra".

== Personal life ==
Krishnakumar was featured as one of the 37 Indians of tomorrow by India Today’ in its 37th-anniversary issue with Ranbir Kapoor and Virat Kohli in December 2012.

Krishnakumar is a member of the Global Shapers community, an initiative of the World Economic Forum (2012). He was a panelist at the World Economic Forum on India 2012 (South Asia's Children—Are We Thinking about South Asia's Tomorrow) with Sarah Brown (wife of ex Prime Minister, UK) and Ulhas Yargop President, IT Sector, Mahindra & Mahindra, India.

== Filmography ==
Key
†	Denotes films that have not yet been released

Year	Film	Role	Notes
2010	Kadhalagi	Thyagu	
2020	Putham Pudhu Kaalai	Arun Krishnan	Anthology Series Segment; Ilamai Idho Idho
2020	Soorarai Pottru	Chaitanya 'Che' Rao	
2022	Maaran	Inspector Arjun	
2024	Kalki 2898 AD	Krishna	Telugu film
2024	Sarfira	Chaitanya Rao	Hindi Film
TBA	Walking/Talking Strawberry Icecream †	TBA	
