= Kadhalagi =

- Directed by: K. R. Vishwaa
- Written by: K. R. Vishwaa; C. P. Narayan (dialogues)
- Produced by: K. R. Vishwaa
- Starring: Krishnakumar Balasubramanian; Srushti Dange; Amrita Chhabria; Nadhim Khan; Roshan Nawaz; Nakshatra
- Cinematography: Ravi Shankar
- Edited by: B. Manoharan
- Music by: A. R. Reihana; S. Thaman (score)
- Production company: K Creations
- Release date: 28 May 2010
- Running time: 125 minutes
- Country: India
- Language: Tamil

Kadhalagi (transl. Fall in love) is a 2010 Tamil language coming of age film directed and produced by K. R. Vishwaa. The film stars newcomers Krishnakumar Balasubramanian, Srushti Dange, Amrita Chhabria, Nadhim Khan, Roshan Nawaz, and Nakshatra, while Prakash Raj and newcomer Vijay Gopal play supporting roles. The film had musical score by A. R. Reihana, cinematography by Ravi Shankar, and editing by B. Manoharan. The film released on 28 May 2010.

== Plot ==
A group of four youngsters gets on a train. They are then scolded by a quick-tempered stranger named AK (Prakash Raj), who tells them that today's young people are immature and good-for-nothing. The friends are about to prove him wrong.

Nandhini Velu Nachiyar (Srushti Dange), Reshmi Kaur (Amrita Chhabria), Mahesh Muthusamy (Nadhim Khan), Mohammed Aslam (Roshan Nawaz), and Angelina Kristy (Nakshatra) were visual communication students and best friends. After graduation, they had to split up and go in different directions. They then met the magician Thyagu (Krishnakumar Balasubramanian), and everything changed. Thyagu and Nandhini were childhood friends and in love with each other. However, both were from different castes. Nandhini's brother-in-law Raja Rajasekharan (Vijay Gopal) was a despicable caste fanatic and an influential person. He had hatred towards every caste other than his and wanted his community's people to get high posts in society. Thereafter, the six friends formed a group named "Mantra", performing dance, magic, or songs for advertising companies. When Raja was made aware of Nandhini's love, he killed her and swept this issue under the rug. The five friends protested for justice for Nandhini's death, but the police force stopped the protest and beat up the friends. The five then started a TV show in which they exposed the truth behind Nandhini's death.

When the four friends reach their destination, AK is shocked to see Thyagu and Nandhini together. He reveals that he is actually a CBI officer who was in charge of Raja's case and then forces the friends to tell him what happened. The friends reveal that Nandhini's death was a sham, and they used a fake body to make it look like Nandhini. Also, Raja had committed suicide when the police tried to arrest him for Nandini's murder. While AK is initially unhappy, he praises the youngsters for their bravery and hushes up the case, revealing his real name as Ananthakrishnan. He then departs, while the six friends happily rejoice.

== Cast ==
- Krishnakumar Balasubramanian as Thyagu
- Srushti Dange as Nandhini Velu Nachiyar
- Amrita Chhabria as Reshmi Kaur
- Nadhim Khan as Mahesh Muthusamy
- Roshan Nawaz as Mohammed Aslam
- Nakshatra as Angelina Kristy
- Prakash Raj as Ananthakrishnan (AK)
- Vijay Gopal as Raja Rajasekharan
- George Maryan as Sankaran
- Kashish as Kashish Kapoor
- Santhesh as Sivaprabhu
- Jayashree as Mythili
- Payisha

== Soundtrack ==
Kadhalagi

Soundtrack album by A. R. Reihana
- Released: 14 April 2010
- Recorded: 2010
- Genre: Feature film soundtrack
- Length: 28:19
- Label: Star Music
- Producer: A. R. Reihana

A. R. Reihana chronology
Aadatha Aattamellam (2009)	Kadhalagi (2010)	Vasanthathinte Kanal Vazhikalil (2014)

The soundtrack was composed by A. R. Reihana and background score by S. Thaman. The soundtrack was released on 14 April 2010 (Tamil New Year). The audio was launched at the Film chambers in Chennai, alongside politician M. K. Alagiri, Vairamuthu, R. K. Selvamani, V. C. Guhanathan, Sivasakthi Pandian, A. R. Reihana and others.

All tracks are written by Vairamuthu.

Track-List
No.	Title	Singer(s)	Length
1.	"Manadhil Poochedi"	Deepa Miriam, Belly Raj, Bignic, Sravana Bhargavi	5:01
2.	"Vaazhvomay Vaazhvomay"	Suchitra, Kavi Suresh	4:23
3.	"Udal Mozhi Ulagin"	Suzanne D'Mello	4:19
4.	"Kaadhale Kaadhale"	Shankar Mahadevan	4:37
5.	"Kannadasan Kavithaigalai"	Haricharan	5:14
6.	"Roja Thottathil"	Benny Dayal, Karthik, Prashanthini, A. R. Reihana	4:45
Total length:			28:19

=== Reception ===
A critic stated, "the album is youthful and peppy. The singers do justice to the fresh music of A. R. Reihana and the wonderful lyrics of Vairamuthu. Only thing is you must listen to the songs in this album with an open mind".

== Reception ==
A critic said, "Every character has complete importance in this film as the suspenseful factors are unravelled only during the point of climax. For sure, you will appreciate K. R. Vishwa for his extraordinary skill for sharp, elegant screenplay".
