= Sudha Kongara =

Indian film director and screenwriter

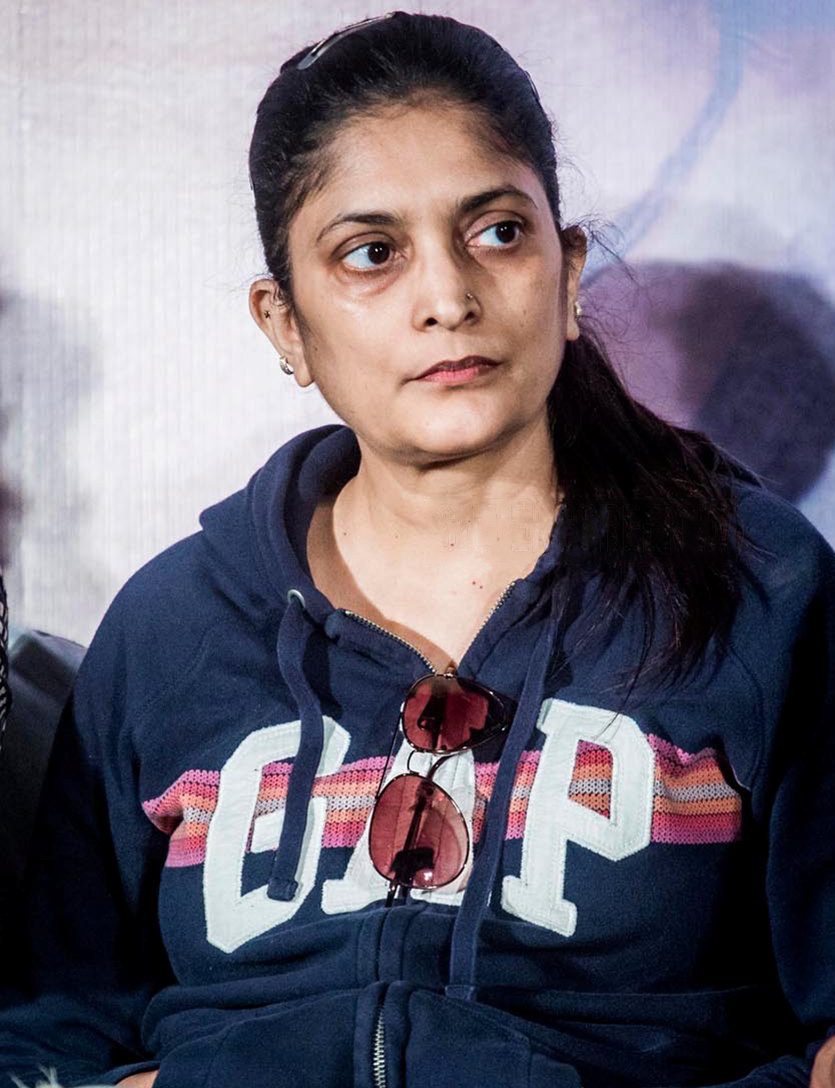
- Kongara at Irudhi Suttru thanksgiving meet in 2016
- Born: Vijayawada, Andhra Pradesh, India
- Other name: Sudha Kongara Prasad
- Education: Women's Christian College, Chennai
- Occupation: Film director Screenwriter
- Years active: 2002–present

Sudha Kongara Prasad, known professionally as Sudha Kongara, is an Indian film director and screenwriter who predominantly works in Tamil. She made her directorial debut with the Telugu film Andhra Andhagadu (2008), and in Tamil with Drohi (2010). In 2016, she directed the bilingual Irudhi Suttru (Saala Khadoos in Hindi) for which she won the Filmfare Award for Best Director – Tamil. She subsequently directed the film's Telugu remake, Guru (2017). In her career, working over 3 languages, she has won two National Film Awards, two Filmfare Awards South, two Tamil Nadu State Film Awards and two SIIMA Awards.

In 2020, she scripted, and directed Soorarai Pottru. It was featured in the Panorama Section of the Shanghai International Film Festival. At the 68th National Film Awards, it won five awards including Best Feature Film, and Best Screenplay for Sudha Kongara.

== Early life ==
Sudha Kongara was born in Vijayawada, Andhra Pradesh, into a Telugu-speaking family. Sudha grew up in Chennai, Tamil Nadu. She obtained a degree in History and Mass Communication from the Women's Christian College, Chennai.

== Career ==
Kongara worked as a screenwriter for the English film Mitr, My Friend (2002). She worked as associate director for seven years with Mani Ratnam.

During the production of her first Tamil directorial venture Drohi (2010), Kongara began writing a sports drama film on boxing which was titled Irudhi Suttru. In mid-2013, she approached Madhavan, who was on a sabbatical from Tamil films, to portray the lead role in the film and his presence in the project, helped take the financial viability of the venture to a higher level. The pair had previously collaborated in Madhavan's films under the direction of Mani Ratnam, where Sudha had been an associate director. Madhavan portrayed a boxing coach who mentors an amateur boxer, played by kick boxer turned actress Ritika Singh. The film was simultaneously shot in Hindi as Saala Khadoos. She also directed the Telugu remake Guru (2017), with Singh reprising her role and Venkatesh playing Madhavan's.

Her next film was Soorarai Pottru (2020), which is based on life of Air Deccan founder Captain GR Gopinath feature and it is produced by Suriya's 2D Entertainment and co-produced by Guneet Monga of Sikhya Entertainment. Due to the COVID-19 pandemic, the film released straight to streaming on Prime Video. It received critical acclaim and won 5 National Film Awards. She also directed the Hindi remake Sarfira (2024), starring Akshay Kumar.

Kongara's next film, Parasakthi, is based on the 1965 anti Hindi protests in Tamil Nadu. Suriya was originally set to collaborate with Kongara again, but now the film stars Ravi Mohan, Sivakarthikeyan, Atharvaa and Sreeleela in the lead roles. Parasakthi was released in theatres on 10 January 2026, during the week of Pongal and received mixed reviews .

== Filmography ==
=== As film director ===
| Year | Title | Language | Notes |
|---|---|---|---|
| 2008 | Andhra Andhagadu | Telugu | Credited as Sudha |
| 2010 | Drohi | Tamil | |
| 2016 | Irudhi Suttru | Tamil; Hindi | Hindi (as Saala Khadoos) |
| 2017 | Guru | Telugu | Remake of Irudhi Suttru |
| 2020 | Putham Pudhu Kaalai | Tamil | Segment: "Ilamai Idho Idho" |
| 2020 | Soorarai Pottru | Tamil | |
| 2020 | Paava Kadhaigal | Tamil | Segment: "Thangam" |
| 2024 | Sarfira | Hindi | Remake of Soorarai Pottru |
| 2026 | Parasakthi | Tamil | |

=== As screenwriter ===
| Year | Title | Language | Notes |
|---|---|---|---|
| 2002 | Mitr, My Friend | English | |
