= Deccan College =

Deccan College may refer to:

- Deccan College Post-Graduate and Research Institute (Pune, India)
- Deccan College of Engineering and Technology (Hyderabad, India)
- Deccan College of Medical Sciences, a medical college in Hyderabad, India.
