= Soorarai Pottru =

2020 Indian film by Sudha Kongara

- Official release poster
- Directed by: Sudha Kongara
- Screenplay by: Shalini Usha Nair; Sudha Kongara
- Based on: Simply Fly: A Deccan Odyssey by G. R. Gopinath
- Produced by: Suriya; Jyothika; Guneet Monga
- Starring: Suriya; Aparna Balamurali; Paresh Rawal
- Cinematography: Niketh Bommi
- Edited by: Sathish Suriya
- Music by: G. V. Prakash Kumar
- Production companies: 2D Entertainment; Sikhya Entertainment
- Distributed by: Amazon Prime Video
- Release date: 12 November 2020
- Running time: 149 minutes
- Country: India
- Language: Tamil

Soorarai Pottru (transl. Praise the Brave) is a 2020 Indian Tamil-language drama film directed by Sudha Kongara, who wrote the screenplay with Shalini Usha Nair. The film, co-produced by Suriya and Jyothika of 2D Entertainment and Guneet Monga of Sikhya Entertainment, stars Suriya, Aparna Balamurali and Paresh Rawal, while Mohan Babu, Urvashi and Karunas appear in supporting roles. The film was inspired by events from the life of G. R. Gopinath, founder of Indian low-cost airline Simplifly Deccan, as described in his memoir Simply Fly: A Deccan Odyssey.

The project was announced in mid-2018 under the working title Suriya 38, and the official title was announced in April 2019. Principal photography began the same month and ended that September, and filming took place in Madurai, Chennai, and Raigarh. G. V. Prakash Kumar composed the film's music, while Niketh Bommireddy was the cinematographer and Sathish Suriya edited the film.

The theatrical release of the film was affected by post-production delays and the COVID-19 pandemic; it was released through Amazon Prime Video on 12 November 2020, the eve of the Diwali festival, and received critical acclaim. It was selected as one of ten Indian films to be screened in the Best Foreign Film category at the 78th Golden Globe Awards. The film also entered the Panorama Section of the Shanghai International Film Festival. Soorarai Pottru won seven awards at the Tamil Nadu State Film Awards, and earned five awards at the 68th National Film Awards: Best Feature Film, Best Actor (Suriya), Best Actress (Aparna), Best Screenplay (Sudha and Nair) and Best Background Score (G. V. Prakash Kumar). A Hindi remake Sarfira, again directed by Sudha, was released in 2024.

== Plot ==
Nedumaaran Rajangam, nicknamed "Maara," is a former Indian Air Force pilot officer who dreams of starting a low-cost carrier airline. He idolises Paresh Goswami, the owner of Jaz Airlines. One day, Maara is visited by Sundari "Bommi," whose family is looking for a groom for her. Bommi is a fiery young woman who wants to open her own bakery. Maara is impressed by Bommi's nature and agrees to marry her. He tells her that he grew up as a rebellious boy and had a difficult and contentious relationship with his father. Maara joined the Indian Air Force, where he excelled but was often reprimanded by his superior, M. Naidu, due to his rebellious nature. When his father was on his deathbed, Maara tried to book a flight home, but he did not have enough money. He asks several people at the airport to help him out financially, but to no avail. When he reaches his house after a long journey by road and train, he discovers that his father has died and his last rites have occurred. This event sparked Maara's ambition to start a low-cost carrier airline. Bommi, however, rejects him, saying that she and Maara are already married to their respective ambitions.

Maara visits Naidu to ask for the ex-serviceman loan so he can start his airline but Naidu refuses. With no other option, Maara travels on the same flight as Paresh. He proposes that they work together to start a low-cost carrier. Paresh, however, believes the poor should not travel with the rich and humiliates Maara. Prakash Babu, the head of a venture capital firm overhears Maara's conversation with Paresh and asks him to explain his business plan to the firm's board. Meanwhile, Maara and Bommi start meeting each other frequently and eventually get married. He plans to lease Boeing aircraft from PlaneAm, who have agreed to lease it to them at low prices. After his funds get sanctioned, Maara tries to meet with Directorate General of Civil Aviation (DGCA) officials to acquire the license, but they disregard him. Maara then meets the President of India and requests his help in getting the license.

Irked by his progress, Paresh uses his power to pass a law that requires Boeing to submit its airline blueprints to fly in Indian airspace. PlaneAm cancels the lease and demands a penalty fee. Maara requests Prakash to loan him money to pay the penalty but he refuses. Prakash reveals he was working with Paresh, with whom he conspired to bring Maara down, and that Jaz Airlines has acquired the aircraft instead. Infuriated, Maara storms into Paresh's office but is tackled by the guards. He becomes short-tempered and often quarrels with Bommi but later apologises. He realises that he can fly smaller aircraft and strikes a deal with a Turboprop aircraft manufacturer. Paresh, fearing Maara may affect his business, decides to take matters into his own hands. Meanwhile, Maara's entire village helps him by donating as much money as they can. He plans to commence flight operations from airstrips that have been abandoned since the major airports came under Paresh's control. He names his airline Deccan Air, and sells tickets at railway stations and petrol pumps. Retired Air Force pilots are hired to fly the aircraft and Bommi wins the bid for in-flight catering.

On the day of the delivery of the aircraft, Paresh uses his influence to restrict the flight's landing at Chennai, forcing the flight to crash-land at Tambaram Air Force Station due to the lack of fuel. Naidu summons Maara to explain the emergency landing and lets him off with a fine. The airline's maiden flight catches fire and is forced to abort its takeoff. It is revealed that Paresh bribed the captain to sabotage the flight. The captain admits his mistakes in front of the inquiry panel. Vimal Balaiyya, a prominent businessman, offers to buy Deccan Air but Maara refuses, citing differences in their vision. Paresh starts a smear campaign against Deccan Air in the hopes of ending Maara's dreams but Maara assures everyone that his flights are safe and cost-effective. On the day of the start of operations, however, no passengers checked in for one of the flights. Maara is about to give up when he is informed that a technical error resulted in no tickets for that particular flight being booked, whereas all other flights are fully booked. With tears of happiness in his eyes, Maara watches the other flights touch down. Paresh later calls Maara and offers to work with him but Maara rejects the offer, saying farmers have flown and will continue to fly, and that Paresh does not own the sky. Paresh accepts defeat as Deccan Air becomes a success.

In a mid-credits scene, the Civil Aviation Minister of India summons Paresh to Delhi, reprimands him for sabotaging Deccan Air's inaugural flight and threatens to shut down Jaz Airlines. In a restroom, Paresh has an anxiety attack and tries to take his pill but it falls to the floor. A janitor picks up the pill for Paresh, inducing in him a sense of respect for lower-income groups.

== Cast ==
Adapted from the closing credits:

- Suriya as Nedumaaran "Maara" Rajangam
- Aparna Balamurali as Sundari "Bommi" Nedumaaran
- Paresh Rawal as Paresh Goswami
- Mohan Babu as M. Bhaktavatsalam Naidu
- Urvashi as Pechi Rajangam
- Poo Ramu as Rajangam
- Karunas as Alapparai
- Krishnakumar as Chaitanya "Che" Rao
- Vivek Prasanna as Sebastian "Seby"
- Kaali Venkat as Kaali
- Vinodhini Vaidyanathan as Chitra Ramaswamy
- Prakash Belawadi as Prakash Babu
- Achyuth Kumar as Anantha Narayanan
- Dan Dhanoa as Vimal Balaiyya
- R. S. Shivaji as Anantha Narayanan's PA
- Ramachandran Durairaj as Arivu
- G. Gnanasambandan as Chinnaswamy
- Vishalini as Muthulakshmi
- Supergood Subramani as a marriage broker
- RJ Anandhi as a stewardess
- Priya Prince as Seby's wife
- Cassendra as Preethi
- Ilan as Seby's son
- Iyal as Seby's daughter
- Udumalai Kalam as the President of India
- Somasekar as an IAF cadet
- Mirchi Senthil as himself (uncredited)

== Production ==
=== Development ===
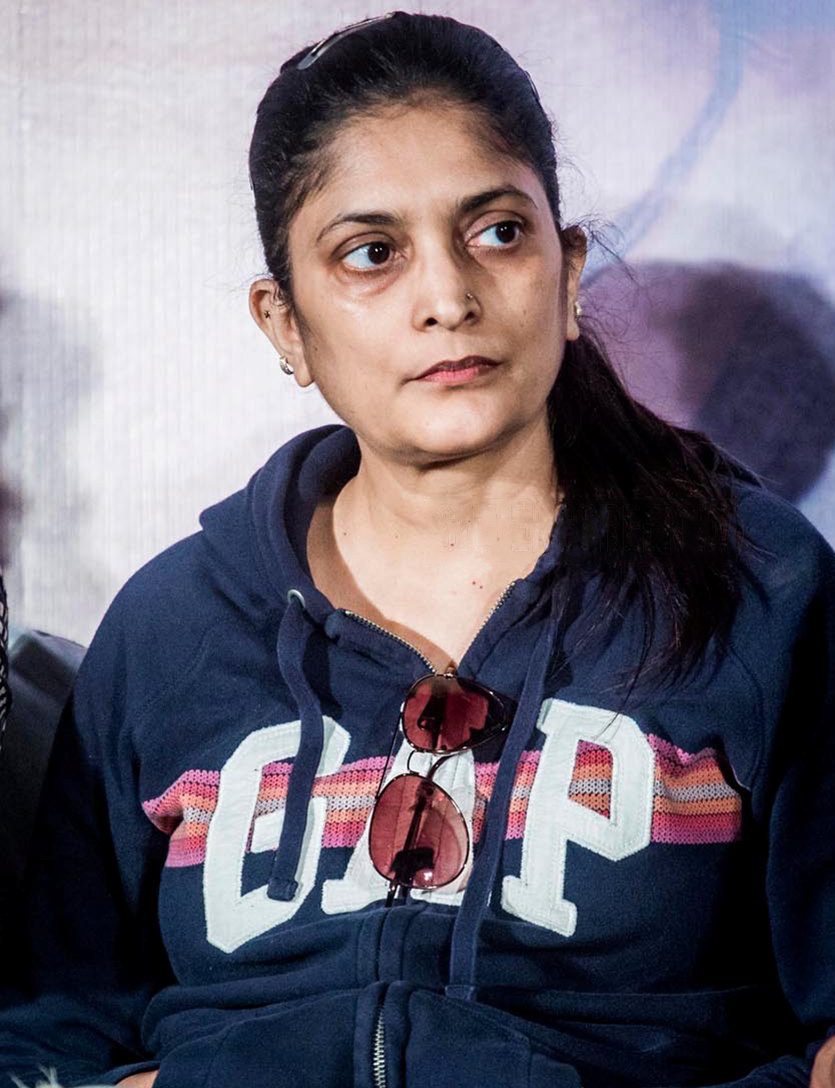
Sudha Kongara, director of Soorarai Pottru in 2016.

In late 2009, Sudha Kongara conceptualised a film based on Simply Fly: A Deccan Odyssey by Simplifly Deccan founder-and-entrepreneur G. R. Gopinath. She did extensive research for the subject for more than ten years. After the release of her Irudhi Suttru (2016), Sudha met Suriya and narrated the half-complete script; Suriya was impressed, and both began work on the project after completing their respective projects. Suriya chose to produce the film as he wanted no-one to interfere in the budget or to change any sequence. Guneet Monga of Sikhya Entertainment also agreed to produce the film, which became the studio's first in Tamil.

The film was officially announced in April 2018 with the tentative title Suriya 38. Pre-production work on the film began in June 2018. The film's technical crew were cinematographer Niketh Bommireddy, editor Sathish Suriya and production designer Jacki. Sudha confirmed the film is not a biopic of Gopinath, but was inspired by events in his life. Sudha made changes to the script and screenplay to suit the film's real-life events. On 13 April 2019, the title was revealed with a poster release as Soorarai Pottru, named after a line from a poem by Subramania Bharati.

=== Casting ===
Sudha wanted to bring out my personal emotions and my personal experiences while we were talking about script, and then talked about it from her point of view [...] Doing certain things out of my comfort zone felt new. For example, when I speak, I pause a lot and speak, thinking through the sentence and then uttering it. But Sudha gave me dialogues that should be uttered continuously. I believe I smile a lot. And she'd ensure I didn't do that. Every sentence had a rhythm that was set. Eventually, I became more like Maara and not Suriya.

— Suriya, in an interview with The Times of India

Suriya played the role of Nedumaaran Rajangam (Maara), an ambitious man from Madurai; the character is loosely based on G. R. Gopinath. He said his character "is prone to anger ... Even in anger, he is able to think of why certain people are coming from a different perspective. He knows how to behave with his wife, his friends and others". Sudha fixed these elements before filming to make the performance look consistent. He also did few physical transformations; For scenes of the character as a young man, Suriya had lost almost 20 kg (44 lb) to gain physique for the role.

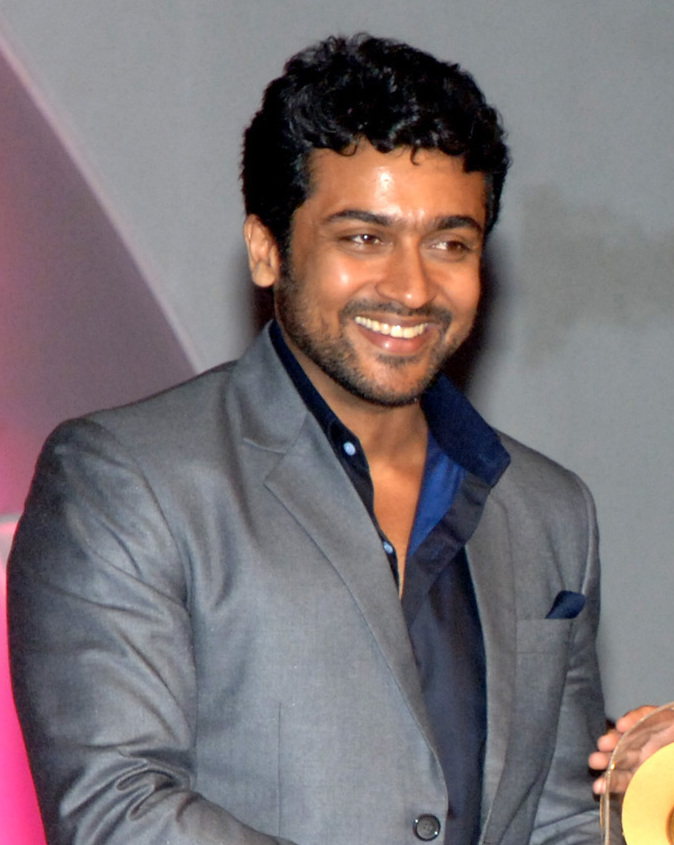
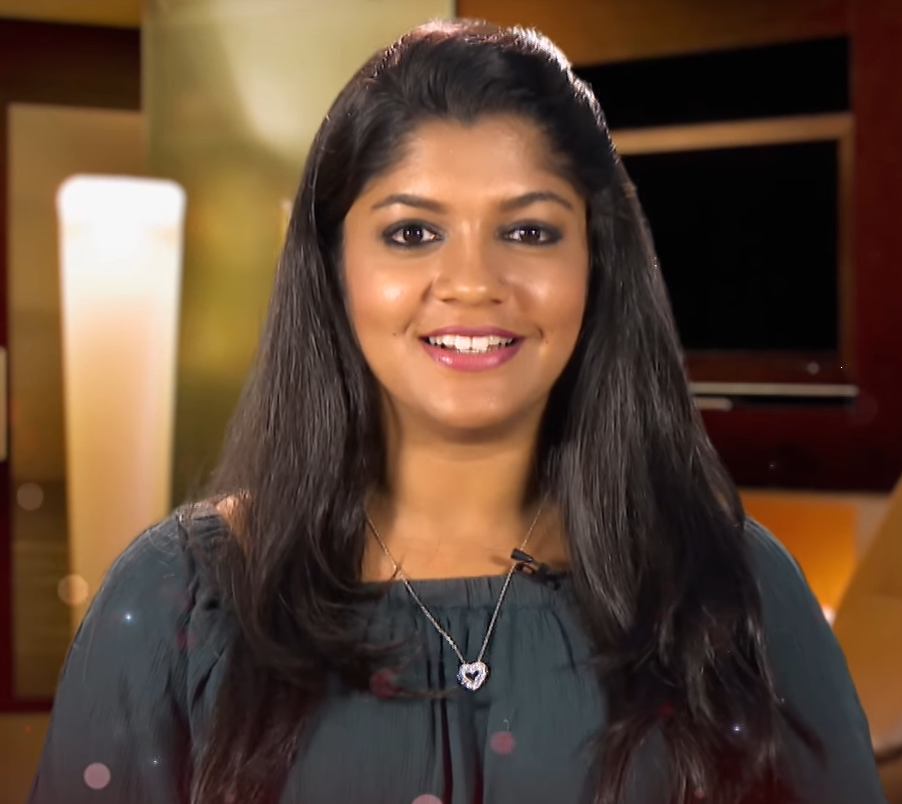
Suriya plays Nedumaaran Rajangam and Aparna Balamurali plays Sundari. Their characters are based on G. R. Gopinath and his wife Bhargavi.

Aparna Balamurali was signed to play the female lead, working with Suriya for the first time. Her character Sundari was modelled on Gopinath's wife Bhargavi. Aparna also learnt the Madurai dialect for the film. In June 2019, Telugu actor Mohan Babu was signed to appear in the film. He immediately accepted the role when approached, and dubbed in his own voice. Soorarai Pottru is also the acting debut of Arjunan's son Ilan and daughter Iyal.

Bollywood actor Paresh Rawal was cast as the antagonist Paresh Goswami, making his Tamil debut. The character is based on Naresh Goyal, CEO of Jet Airways. Dan Dhanoa appeared in a short role as Vimal Balaiyya, which was inspired by Indian businessman Vijay Mallya. Sheik Maideen, who had a close resemblance to former president of India A. P. J. Abdul Kalam and was popularly known as "Udumalai Kalam", played the character inspired by Kalam; Maideen's voice was dubbed by Naveen Muralidhar. R. Madhavan gave the narration for the film.

=== Filming ===
Principal photography on Soorarai Pottru began on 7 April 2019. The first filming schedule was completed on 16 April 2019 and took place in Tamil Nadu. The second schedule began on 23 April 2019 at Chandigarh and finished on 6 June 2019. Scenes were filmed on a specially constructed set resembling the interior and exterior of an aircraft that was designed by art director Jacki. Cinematographer Niketh Bommireddy said the crew used hand-held cameras during the principal shooting session because most of the film was shot in closed interiors.

The third schedule started on 14 June 2019, when scenes featuring Mohan Babu and Paresh Rawal were filmed. Rawal completed his scenes the following month. Also in July, the crew went to Hyderabad to film major sequences. A month-long schedule took place in August, during which some important scenes were filmed in Madurai and surrounding locations. It marked Suriya's return to filming in Madurai after Pithamagan (2003). During the schedule, Suriya organised a meet with fans, around 800 of whom met Suriya during the shoot. The crew later returned to Chennai, where they erected a building at a location near Chennai International Airport to hide the runway from view.

Except for a few minor scenes, filming on the project ended on 27 September 2019. Suriya delivered gold coins to the film's crew members after completing the shoot. During the patchwork schedule, the team had to hire a real aircraft; the producers spent ₹4.7 million (US$49,000) per day to rent an aircraft for filming. The entire film was completed within 60 working days.

=== Post-production ===
Post-production on Soorarai Pottru began shortly after the end of filming, but it was suspended in March following the COVID-19 pandemic. It resumed in May 2020 after the Tamil Nadu government granted permission, provided workers followed COVID-19 guidelines. In early June, the Central Board of Film Certification granted a U certificate for the film without cuts. The censor board report was released in August; the film's final runtime was 153 minutes and offensive words in the film were muted. This was further trimmed to 149 minutes. The film's deleted scenes were released on 19 February 2021, coinciding with the film's 100th-day run, by the production house through YouTube.

== Music ==
G. V. Prakash Kumar worked on the film's score and soundtrack; in April 2019, before filming commenced, he recorded a song in collaboration with the band Thaikkudam Bridge for a rock number in the film. Singers Dhee, Senthil Ganesh and Harish Sivaramakrishnan of the band Agam also contributed to the album. Prakash worked on the film's background score in October 2019. The following month, Prakash announced Suriya will perform the rap versions of the film's theme music, which is titled "Maara Theme". The song was released on 24 January 2020. Sony Music India released the film's soundtrack album on 24 July 2020.

== Release ==
=== Streaming ===
Soorarai Pottru was originally scheduled for a theatrical release in mid-2020, but suffered delays due to pending post-production work and the COVID-19 pandemic. On 1 May that year on social media, Suriya stated the film would be scheduled for a theatrical release. On 22 August 2020, coinciding with Ganesh Chaturthi, however, Suriya announced the film would have a direct-to-streaming release on Amazon Prime Video on 30 October 2020, and the theatrical release was cancelled. Suriya stated this decision was made because his production house 2D Entertainment had been facing financial difficulties due to the pandemic and had 8-10 projects to be produced; he also said he took his decision as a producer, not as an actor, and had to safeguard his projects and the crew working in the films. In an interview with HuffPost, Suriya said: "I am able to maintain all the families of those working in those projects because I took the OTT route. That cheque saved families, and that's all I see right now".

The direct-to-streaming release announcement disappointed many of Suriya's fans, who wanted to watch the film in theatres, and they asked him to reconsider his decision. Suriya faced a similar controversy when he released his film Ponmagal Vandhal (2020) on the same streaming service; it became the first Tamil film to be digitally released during the pandemic, and Suriya received pushback from theatre owners and exhibitors for his decision. Director Hari wrote to Suriya, asking him to reconsider the decision of releasing the film digitally, while Bharathiraja defended him and welcomed his decision, stating it was the correct move for the situation. Rajasekar Pandian, the executive producer of 2D Entertainment, stated the film would be premiered by streaming in 200 countries. Suriya further announced that ₹50 million from the film's profits would be donated to film-industry workers, and frontline workers who made necessary efforts to control the pandemic.

A week prior to the film's release date, 21 October 2020, Suriya announced that the film would again be postponed due to a delay in obtaining the No Objection Certificate (NOC) from the IAF. The makers announced a new release date of 12 November 2020, the eve of Diwali festival. Soorarai Pottru was released in Tamil, Telugu, Malayalam and Kannada languages; the Telugu version was titled Aakasam Nee Haddhu Ra (transl. The sky is the limit), and Satyadev provided dubbing for Suriya's character. A Hindi-dubbed version titled Udaan (transl. Flight) was released on 4 April 2021.

=== Marketing ===
As part of the film's promotional strategy, the production company announced they would partner with Indian budget airline SpiceJet, whose chairman Ajay Singh launched his company's Boeing 737 aircraft with a Soorarai Pottru poster branded on it on 13 February 2020. The same day, the second single of the film's soundtrack was launched on the same aircraft. A making-of Soorarai Pottru documentary was released on 14 April 2020, Tamil New Year's Day.

Prior to the film's release, the makers launched a huge space balloon with a special poster at the highest possible altitude. The poster, which also bore the signatures of over 10,000 fans, was launched at 34,000 ft (10,000 m) above sea level. The first-of-a-kind promotional activity went viral on social media platforms and the Internet. A Twitter emoji for the film was launched before its release.

=== Theatrical re-release ===
Soorarai Pottru was planned for theatrical re-release on 23 August 2021, when theatres were allowed to resume operations after closure due to a surge in COVID-19 cases in Tamil Nadu. This decision was planned after the film was screened at Sathyam Cinemas in Chennai for the Chennai International Film Festival in February 2021. 2D Entertainment had planned to screen the film on a free-distribution basis in which the profits earned would be handed to theatre owners. The plan was abandoned when Tamil Nadu Theatre Owners Association (TNTOA) decided not to screen films that were originally released through streaming services. In December 2021, however, fans of Suriya announced the film would be re-released in theatres across Kerala from mid-December 2021 until January 2022. Owing to the response in Kerala, the production company reinstated the decision to re-release it in a limited number of theatres in Tamil Nadu on 4 February 2022.

== Reception ==
=== Critical response ===
Soorarai Pottru received critical acclaim. Writing for The Hindu, Srinivasa Ramanujam said: "Director Sudha Kongara delivers a well-knit cinematic tale that urges us to follow our dreams ... The intensity of proceedings does soften in the second half, when somehow, things seem to fall too quickly in place, with help pouring in from unexpected quarters for the protagonist. However, Suriya as Maara holds the show together". Ranjani Krishnakumar from Firstpost gave the film a rating of four-and-a-half out of five and said; "Sudha Kongara, Suriya tell a moving, poetic biopic without deifying the leading man". Karthik Keramalu from The Quint gave the film a rating of three-and-a-half out of five, calling it a "comeback" for Suriya after the less-positively received works NGK and Kaappaan", adding: "Soorarai Pottru largely works, as it is about a larger-than-life dream than one particular person. I'm not denying that it is based on GR Gopinath's life, but the dramatic events that have carefully been picked from his tall tale are about a handful and director Sudha Kongara has glued them well with enough grit to sustain the proceedings".

M. Suganth of The Times of India gave a rating of three-and-a-half out of five, stating, "Right from the start, the film shows us how the nexus between capitalists and bureaucrats has been instrumental in crushing anyone who dares to dream big, after a point, the hurdles that Maara has to cross begin to feel repetitive, making the film seem a bit overlong. But the closing visuals of the joy on the faces of the common folk who take the flight on Maara's aircraft ensure a smooth touchdown". According to Sudhir Srinivasan from The New Indian Express; "It's a film with character purpose across the board, incisive dialogues, great performances, and much empathy and sensitivity to boot. Soorarai Pottru is the whole package really. It can be said that in charting the life of this man who wanted millions to soar, the film too has managed to".

Logesh Balachandran of India Today gave three-and-a-half stars out of five, saying; "There is a tautness to the storytelling, especially until the interval, that keeps us gripped. The second half, however, lacked that substance which was built in the first half of the film. Sudha could have done a little more research on other aviation stories and incorporated them into the script. That said, the performance of Suriya is what holds the entire film together". Balachandran said the film "was made for the theatrical experience and would have been an amazing watch on the big screen", and concluded "the OTT release has given the makers of the film a wider reach". Gauthaman Bhaskaran of News18 gave the film two-and-a-half stars out of five and stated; "Soorarai Pottru could have been far more inspiring and even engrossing had director Sudha Kongara done away with unnecessary songs and emotions. Her plane would have had a smoother flight sans the turbulence". According to Sify, which gave the film four stars out of five; "Soorarai Pottru stands out with its fine writing and outstanding performance of Suriya".

Sowmya Rajendran, editor-in-chief of The News Minute gave four out of five and stated; "Suriya is in fine form, switching between angry young man to conflicted son, romantic husband and cussing businessman ... Soorarai Pottru is easily Suriya's best outing in a long time. It's a pleasant flight even if there's some turbulence along the way". Critic Shubhra Gupta of The Indian Express gave two out of five and stated; "Soorarai Pottru is marred by the high-pitched melodrama whistled up every time the script needs to create fan-pleasing moments. Given Suriya's mega popularity, that is an always present temptation, and the film gives in, much too often." Writing for Hindustan Times, Haricharan Pudipeddi said; "Soorarai Pottru, which will go down as one of the best films of the year, is Suriya's return to form (after a few mediocre films) and it's quite gutsy of a mainstream hero to produce and star in a film that doesn't tick all those boxes of a typical commercial entertainer". Baradwaj Rangan wrote for Film Companion; "In terms of sheer professionalism, the film is the best thing that's come on the southern OTT space".

=== Accolades ===
Soorarai Pottru was selected as one of ten Indian films to be screened in the Best Foreign Film category at the 78th Golden Globe Awards. On 26 January 2021, the film's executive producer Rajasekar Pandian announced that Soorarai Pottru had been entered into the 93rd Academy Awards, for Best Actor, Best Actress, Best Director, Best Original Score and other categories. He also stated that it had been made available to members of the Academy of Motion Picture Arts and Sciences for votes and nomination at the Academy Screening Room. Although the film was one of 366 films that were eligible for nomination, it failed to progress further in the voting process. Soorarai Pottru was also screened at the Chennai International Film Festival. The film also entered the Panorama section of the Shanghai International Film Festival. It won two awards at the Indian Film Festival of Melbourne, namely Best Film and Best Actor (Suriya). It was nominated in 14 categories at the 10th South Indian International Movie Awards and won seven awards. At the 68th National Film Awards, Soorarai Pottru won five awards: Best Feature Film, Best Actor (Suriya), Best Actress (Aparna), Best Original Screenplay (Sudha and Nair) and Best Background Score (Prakash Kumar). The film won 7 awards at the Tamil Nadu State Film Awards.

== Impact ==
The film became the second-most-tweeted hashtag of the year in entertainment, according to a survey report by Twitter for India. The film also became the second-most-searched topic in Google Trends in India, becoming the only South Indian film to appear in the list. As of February 2021, Soorarai Pottru is the most-watched regional language film in the history of Amazon Prime Video in India.

== Remake ==
Soorarai Pottru was remade in Hindi as Sarfira by Sudha Kongara. The remake was produced by Suriya and Vikram Malhotra. It stars Akshay Kumar and Radhika Madan, with Paresh Rawal reprising his role. Suriya appears in a cameo role. G. V. Prakash Kumar was retained to compose a new soundtrack. The film was released in theatres on 12 July 2024.

== See also ==
- Film à clef
