= Kolhapur Airport =

Airport in Maharashtra, India

Chhatrapati Rajaram Maharaj Airport
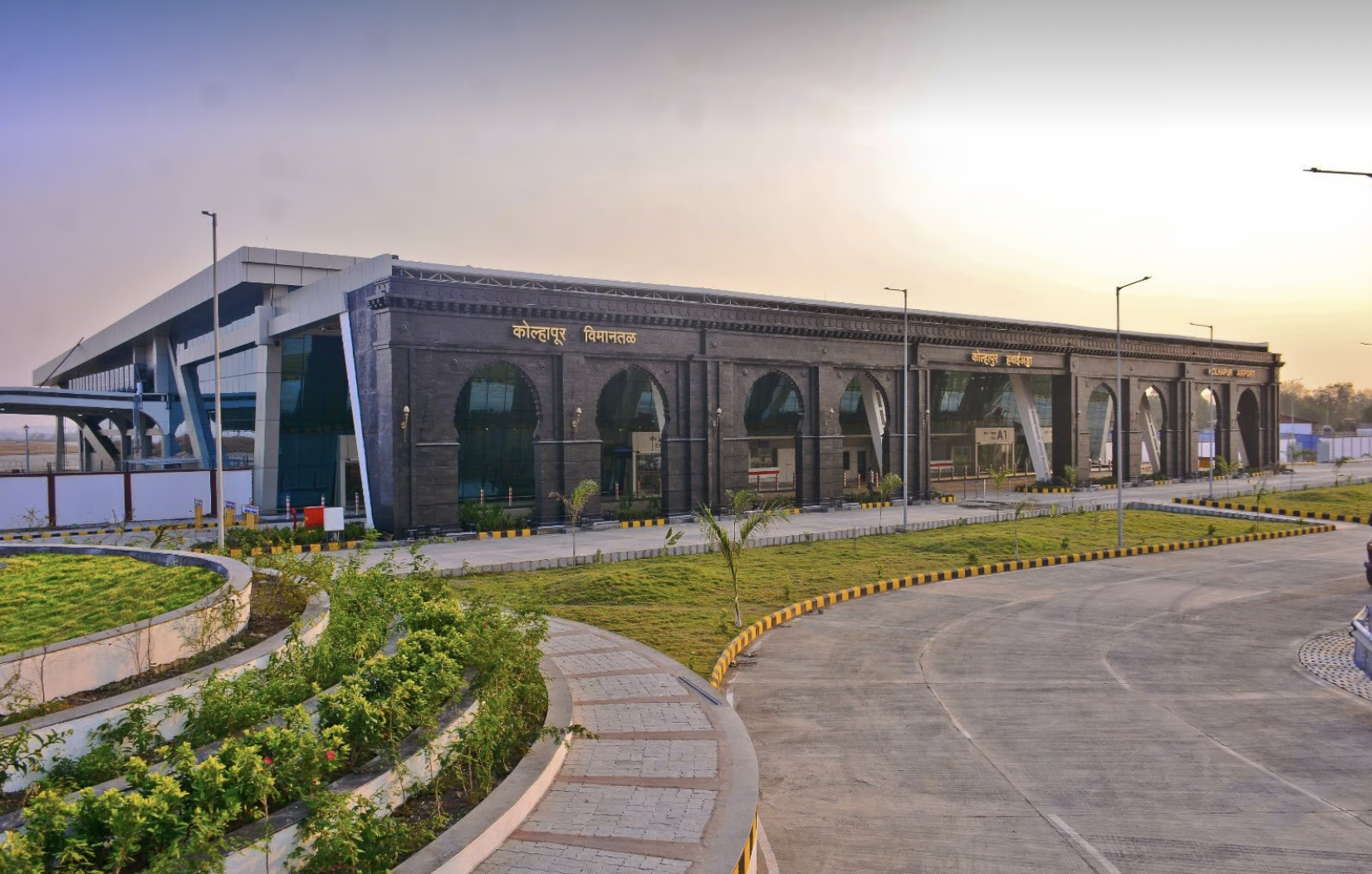
- IATA: KLH; ICAO: VAKP

Summary
- Airport type: Public
- Owner: Airports Authority of India
- Operator: Airports Authority of India
- Serves: Kolhapur, Ichalkaranji, Sangli, Karad
- Location: Ujlaiwadi, Kolhapur, Maharashtra, India
- Opened: 1987; 39 years ago
- Elevation AMSL: 1,988 ft (606 m)
- Coordinates: 16°39′53″N 074°17′22″E
- Website: Kolhapur Airport

Map
- Location in Maharashtra KLH (India)

Runways
Direction	Length		Surface
Direction	ft	m	Surface
07/25	6,332	1,930	Asphalt

Statistics (April 2025 - March 2026)
- Passengers: 172,015 (▲8.2%)
- Aircraft movements: 3,156 (▼8.1%)
- Cargo tonnage: 0 ( 0%)
- Source: AAI

Kolhapur Airport (IATA: KLH, ICAO: VAKP), officially named as Chhatrapati Rajaram Maharaj Airport, is a domestic airport serving the cities of Kolhapur and Ichalkaranji in the state of Maharashtra, India. It is situated at Ujlaiwadi, 9 km (5.6 mi) southeast from the city. It is operated by the Airports Authority of India (AAI).

== History ==
The present Kolhapur Airport began operations in the year 1987 and was leased by the Maharashtra Industrial Development Corporation (MIDC) from Airports Authority of India (AAI) on 16 April 1997. The lease expired in February 2012 and the MIDC requested the state government in May 2012 to be relieved of the responsibility of managing the airport. The Maharashtra Government then handed over the airport to the AAI in August 2013.

The airport was closed for repairs by order of the DGCA on 16 June 2010, after the runway surface was found to be unsafe in the monsoons. Due to the closure, flights into Kolhapur were temporarily suspended. DGCA gave its approval for re-opening of the airport in April 2011 after MIDC repaired the 1,370 metre long and 50 metre wide runway. MIDC also added facilities like closed circuit television system, baggage scanner, door-frame, hand-held metal detectors, and guide lights along the airstrip at a total cost of ₹ 6 crore. Kingfisher Airlines resumed commercial flights on 10 June 2011. The service to Mumbai was suspended in November 2011 when the airline pulled out of several towns citing financial losses. After a closure of six years, scheduled commercial operations at the airport resumed in April 2018 with Air Deccan launching its first flight to Mumbai under the UDAN scheme.

In March 2018, the Maharashtra Legislative Assembly passed a resolution recommending the central government to rename the airport as ‘Chhatrapati Rajaram Maharaj Airport' after the member of the erstwhile royal family of Kolhapur. The First Airport Director (Kamal Kumar Kataria), was appointed on 13 December 2018 by Airports Authority of India, for purposes of the airport's development. Since 14/9/2022 Anil Haribhau Shinde is serving as the Airport Director under whose lead the new Terminal Building has been operational. Other developments include installation of Navigation Aids DVOR/DME and operations from new ATC Tower.

== Expansion ==
The airport is undergoing a massive rebuild, making it capable of handling Boeing 737 and Airbus A320 aircraft. The foundation stone for a new terminal building and an ATC tower was laid by the former Union Civil Aviation Minister, Suresh Prabhu in February 2019. The new terminal complex is built at a cost of ₹ 71 crore and cover an area of 3,900 square metres. It have 10 check-in counters, and a peak hour handling capacity of 300 passengers. Along with this, the runway length is being extended to 2,300 metres, a new combined Air Traffic Control (ATC) tower, a fire and rescue building, and expanding its apron and related equipment are included. The Maharashtra Industrial Development Corporation (MIDC) has acquired 223 hectares of adjoining land in five villages at the cost of ₹ 240 crore for this purpose. The new terminal has been under construction since 2019, and is expected to be completed by early 2024.

As of April 2021, the runway has been lengthened from 1,370 to 1,930 metres to the east of the airport, and an additional 64 acres near to state highway 277 is acquired to further extend to the full 2,300 metres. Installation of night landing facilities at the airport was completed on the runway in late 2021.

The airport has been facilitated with aviation fuel facility, which means that the aircraft landing here will have the facility to refuel while on halt. The facility, according to experts, will help in carrying more passenger load, which eventually will help both the airlines as well as the passengers. The facility was provided by Hindustan Petroleum, and will henceforth remain available on a permanent basis. Earlier, the limited availability of the fuel restricted the number of passengers on board an aircraft to some extent. However, that would not be the case any more. With the availability of aviation fuel, the number of passengers will increase.

The airport is presently connected with Ahmedabad, Bengaluru, Hyderabad, Mumbai, and Navi Mumbai, with daily and weekly flights provided by IndiGo and low-cost airline Star Air. More airlines and routes will join in the coming years once the runway length will be extended to 2,300 meters.

== New terminal ==
A new terminal building was inaugurated on 10 March 2024 by Prime Minister Narendra Modi and began operations on 29 March 2024.

== Airlines and destinations ==
Airlines	Destinations
IndiGo	Bengaluru, Hyderabad, Mumbai–Navi
Star Air	Mumbai, Ahmedabad, Bengaluru

== See also ==
- List of airports in Maharashtra
