= G. R. Gopinath =

Indian entrepreneur

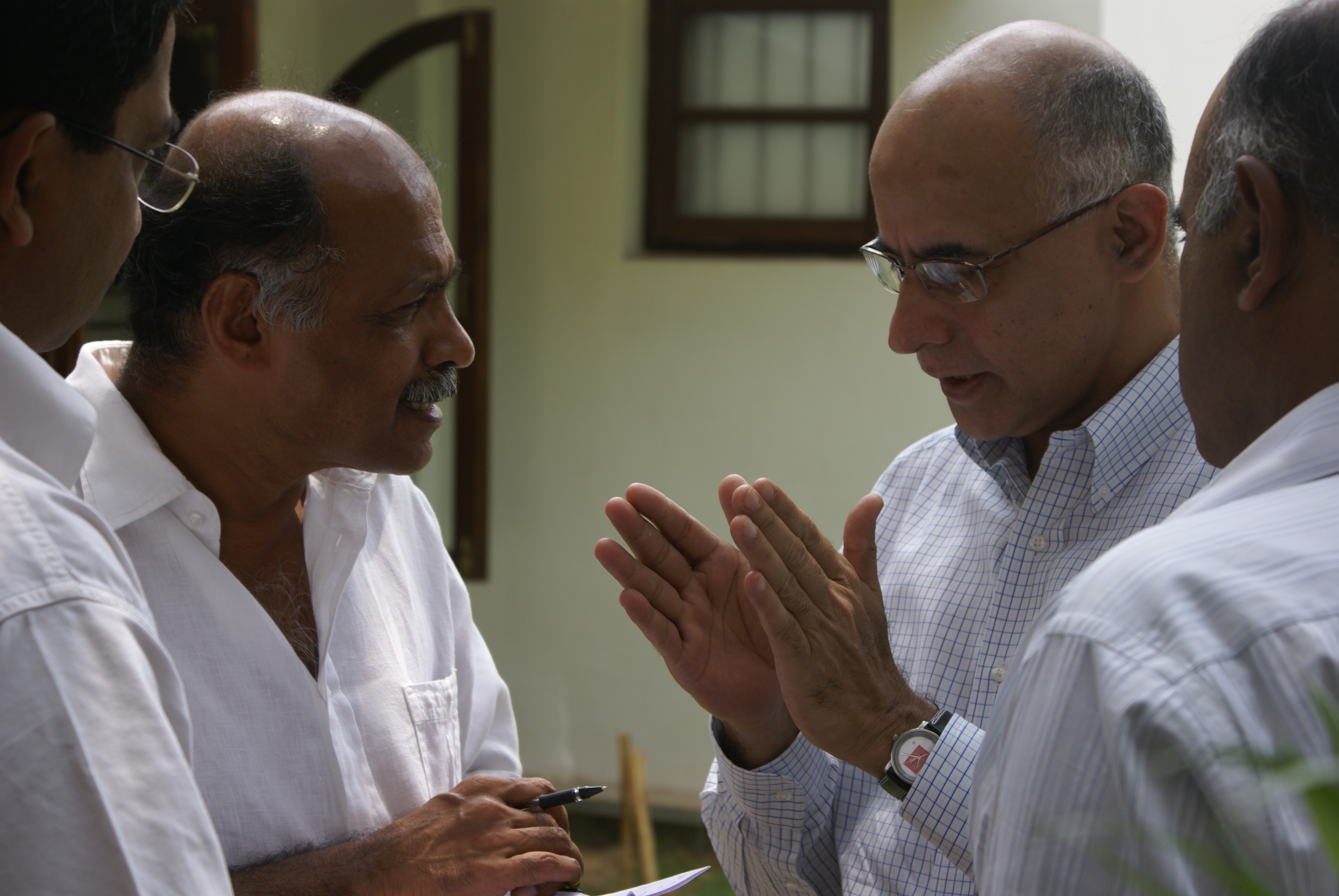
- G. R. Gopinath, left, 2010

Personal details
- Born: 13 November 1951 (age 74) Gorur, Mysore State At present Karnataka State. India
- Education: Sainik School, Bijapur; National Defence Academy, Pune; Indian Military Academy, Dehradun
- Known for: Founder of Simplifly Deccan

Military service
- Allegiance: India
- Rank: Captain

Captain Gorur Ramaswamy Iyengar Gopinath (born 13 November 1951) is an Indian entrepreneur, the founder of Simplifly Deccan, a retired Captain of the Indian Army, an author and a politician.

== Early life ==
Gopinath was born in Gorur, Hassan, in a Tamil family and was brought up in a small village in Gorur in the Hassan district of Karnataka State. Gopinath's father Gorur Ramaswamy Iyengar, a school teacher (not to be confused with Kannada Novelist Gorur Ramaswamy Iyengar who is his mother's uncle), believed that schools were systems of regimentation and was resolved to teach Gopinath at home.

However, Gopinath was admitted to a Kannada medium school quite late and straight away he joined Standard V. Gopinath didn't clear the military school entrance on the first attempt because he wasn't fluent in English. After his headmaster wrote to the defence ministry, Gopinath was allowed to write the exam in Kannada and he cleared the entrance on his second attempt.

In 1962, after Gopinath cleared the admission test, he joined Sainik School, Bijapur. The school helped and prepared Gopinath to clear the NDA entrance exams. After 3 years of vigorous training, Gopinath completed education from the National Defence Academy, Pune. He then went on to graduate from the Indian Military Academy, Dehradun.

== Career ==
After school, he earned a commission in the Indian Army. When he was graduating in 1971, his training was cut short when the 1971 Bangladesh Liberation War broke out. He was 20 when he was first posted to Sikkim. He later rose to the rank of Captain. But he was not happy with waiting for a promotion in the army.

He took early retirement from Indian Army, at the age of 28. Upon retirement from the armed forces, he established an ecologically sustainable sericulture farm; his innovative methods earned him the Rolex Laureate Award in 1996. Next, he started the Malnad Mobikes (Enfield dealership) and opened a hotel in Hassan.

In 1997 he co-founded Deccan Aviation, a charter helicopter service with his two friends, who were also in air force. In 2003, Gopinath founded Air Deccan, a low cost airline; Air Deccan merged with Kingfisher Airlines in 2007. In 2009 he founded Deccan 360, a freight flight business. In July 2013, Deccan 360 was ordered to wind up by the Karnataka High Court order based on petitions filed by Dubai-based United Aviation Services (UAS) and another by M/s Patel Integrated Logistics (PIL) Pvt. Ltd. – seeking recovery of amounts due to them by winding up the company.

In May 2006, he was knighted with "Chevalier de la Legion d’Honneur" the civilian award conferred by the French Government. He has received many awards for Air Deccan.

In 2009, Gopinath contested as an independent candidate in Bangalore South constituency at the Lok Sabha elections but was defeated.

In 2014, he unsuccessfully contested Lok Sabha elections on the ticket of the Aam Aadmi Party. He quit the party citing difference with Arvind Kejriwal for lack of internal democracy within the party.

== Aviation career ==
=== Deccan Aviation ===
Srk moved to Bengaluru in 1992 where he bumped into Captain K.J. Samuel, who was his friend in the army. Samuel was a freelance pilot and was planning to set-up a commercial Helicopter service. In 1995, when the Indian government started a regulatory reforms process to encourage entrepreneurship, Gopinath partnered with Samuel and established Deccan Aviation. Deccan's helicopters were chartered by most politicians and the company also got involved in many rescue missions in Sri Lanka, Nepal, Kabul and South India. The Company grew to become one of the largest private air charter companies in India and Sri Lanka.

Inspired by the success of Southwest Airlines in the United States and Ryanair in Europe, Deccan Aviation launched India's first low-cost airline, Air Deccan in 2003. Deccan Aviation went public in May 2006, however by then the airline was losing money. The following year, the Vijay Mallya lead UB group purchased a strategic 26 per cent stake in Deccan Aviation. At the time of purchase, Air Deccan connected sixty nine cities around India. Mallya merged the two airlines soon after and Capt. Gopinath sold most of his stake in the company in 2009.

=== Deccan Charters ===
During the merger process of Kingfisher with Air Deccan, the Charter services division of Deccan Aviation was transferred into a new company named Deccan Charters Limited after it received its Non-Scheduled Air Operator Permit (NSOP) from the DGCA on 10 October 2008. During that period, the Charter operations continued to perform satisfactorily and increased its presence in off shore flying for the oil sector.

Gopinath used the money from the UB Group deal to start Deccan 360, a cargo airline, in May 2009. But that enterprise too was squeezed by a severe cash crunch and shut shop in 2011. The same year, Gopinath became the 100% owner of Deccan Charters by purchasing the stake Mallya held in the company as part of the 2007 deal. The following year, Gopinath launched daily charter flights in the state of Gujarat under the brand name of Deccan Shuttles. The flights connected Ahmedabad, Surat, Jamnagar, Bhavnagar and Kandla using a nine-seater Cessna Grand Caravan aircraft. The service wound up in 2013.

In April 2017, Deccan charters bid for and won 34 regional Indian routes under the UDAN scheme. Operating under the brand name Air Deccan, it commenced operations in December 2017. Air Deccan operated 19-seater Beechcraft 1900D turboprop aircraft that are suitable for short-haul flights. The airline has planned to connect Delhi, Mumbai, Kolkata and Shillong to regional towns in the vicinity of these cities. However, it could not operate a large number of the RCS routes awarded to it due to the company's weak financials. Scheduled commercial operations were stopped in April 2020 due to the effects of the COVID-19 pandemic and the ensuing lockdown.

== Awards and honors ==
- 1996 – Rolex Awards for Enterprise
- 2005 – Rajyotsava Award (Karnataka)
- 2007 – Chevalier de la Légion d'honneur (France)
- Personality of the Decade Award (K.G. Foundation)
- Sir M Visvesvaraya Memorial Award (Federation of Karnataka Chambers of Commerce & Industry)
- Conferred with honorary doctorate degree from ASBM University, Bhubaneswar by President of India Ram Nath Kovind on 16th September 2023

== In popular culture ==
The 2020 Indian Tamil-language film Soorarai Pottru (or Udaan, in Hindi) was partly inspired by events from the life of Gopinath and is based on his memoir Simply Fly: A Deccan Odyssey.

In 2024, Soorarai Pottru is remade in Hindi as Sarfira starring Akshay Kumar and released.

== Books by Gopinath ==
- Simply Fly: A Deccan Odyssey, Collins Business, 2010, ISBN 978-81-7223-842-1, 978-93-5029-155-9
- "You Cannot Miss This Flight: Essays on Emerging India", HarperCollins, 2017, ISBN 9789352644797
