= Sarfira =

2024 Indian film by Sudha Kongara

- Theatrical release poster
- Directed by: Sudha Kongara
- Screenplay by: Sudha Kongara; Shalini Ushadevi
- Dialogues by: Pooja Tolani
- Story by: G. R. Gopinath
- Based on: Soorarai Pottru (2020) by Sudha Kongara
- Produced by: Aruna Bhatia; Vikram Malhotra; Jyothika; Suriya
- Starring: Akshay Kumar; Paresh Rawal; Radhika Madan
- Cinematography: Niketh Bommireddy
- Edited by: Sathish Suriya
- Music by: G. V. Prakash Kumar
- Production companies: Abundantia Entertainment; 2D Entertainment; Cape of Good Films
- Distributed by: Pen Marudhar Entertainment
- Release date: 12 July 2024
- Running time: 153 minutes
- Country: India
- Language: Hindi
- Budget: ₹80 crore
- Box office: est. ₹30.02 crore

Sarfira (transl. Crazy) is a 2024 Indian Hindi-language drama film directed by Sudha Kongara and produced by 2D Entertainment, Abundantia Entertainment and Cape of Good Films starring Akshay Kumar, Paresh Rawal and Radhika Madan. It is a remake of Kongara's own Tamil film Soorarai Pottru (2020), which itself was an adaptation of G. R. Gopinath's memoir Simply Fly: A Deccan Odyssey. The film follows a man who sets out to make affordable airlines for low income people, which several enemies try to impede.

The remake was officially announced in July 2021 as Project 1, marking the maiden venture of 2D Entertainment in Hindi, and the official title was announced in February 2024. Principal photography commenced in April 2022. The film has music composed by G. V. Prakash Kumar. It marks Akshay Kumar's 150th film in a leading role.

Sarfira was released in theatres worldwide on 12 July 2024. It received mixed reviews from critics who praised Kumar and Rawal's performances which earned them nominations for Best Actor and Best Supporting Actor respectively at the 70th Filmfare Awards.

== Plot ==
Vir Jagannath Mhatre, a young man from a modest village in Maharashtra, dreams of launching a low-cost airline to make air travel accessible to the common people. His ambition stems from his belief that economic and social barriers can be broken through affordable aviation. However, he clashes with his father, a non-violent teacher, who believes in gradual change through education rather than direct action. Their ideological differences create tension between them.

Tragedy strikes when Vir's father falls critically ill, and he is unable to gather the ₹5,200 needed for an emergency flight ticket to see him. As he desperately seeks help, his pleas are ignored, and airport authorities prevent him from boarding. Forced to take a train instead, he arrives home too late—his father has already died. The incident strengthens Vir's resolve to revolutionize air travel in India.

Determined to pursue his dream, Vir joins the Indian Air Force but eventually leaves to focus on his entrepreneurial aspirations. Alongside two fellow trainees, he begins developing his airline concept. He approaches Paresh Goswami, a powerful aviation tycoon, hoping to secure investment. However, Paresh dismisses Vir's vision, mocking his idea of a "flying Udupi hotel." Over time, Paresh emerges as Vir's biggest rival, actively obstructing his efforts through corruption, bureaucratic red tape, and industry manipulation.

Despite numerous setbacks, Vir remains resolute. He finds unwavering support from his wife, Rani, who shares his ambitions and runs a successful bakery. Their relationship is built on mutual respect and defiance of societal norms, as Rani had previously rejected 20 marriage proposals before finding a kindred spirit in Vir.

After years of struggle, Vir successfully launches his airline, Deccan Air, with a fleet of Boeing 737 aircraft. However, just as the airline begins operations, a flight suffers an engine failure on the runway. Investigations reveal that the malfunction was orchestrated by Paresh, further crippling Deccan Air's reputation.

As financial troubles mount, Vir faces another challenge—his airline's ticket prices become three times higher than those of Paresh's competing airline, leading to a decline in passengers. Eventually, a scheduled flight from Mumbai to Pune is cancelled due to low demand, signaling what seems to be the end of Deccan Air. Disheartened, Vir watches as passengers flock to Paresh's airline instead.

However, in a twist of fate, Paresh approaches Vir and confesses to sabotaging Deccan Air's engines. He claims the failure was also due to a software bug in Mumbai's airport system. As Paresh flees the scene, Vir notices that flights from smaller destinations like Pune and Vijayawada are still operational under Deccan Air. Realizing that his vision is still alive, he smiles, determined to rebuild his airline and continue his mission of making air travel accessible to all.

== Cast ==
- Akshay Kumar as Vir Jagannath Mhatre, a pilot-turned-businessman
- Paresh Rawal as Paresh Goswami
- Radhika Madan as Rani Mhatre, Vir’s wife
- Seema Biswas as Vir's mother
- R. Sarathkumar as Nedumaran, Vir's commanding officer in the Air Force
- Saurabh Goyal as Sam, Vir's friend from the Air Force
- Krishnakumar Balasubramanian as Chaitanya Rao, Vir's friend from the Air Force
- Iravati Harshe Mayadev as Chitra
- Anil Charanjeett as Mandar
- Prakash Belawadi as Prakash Babu
- Dan Dhanoa as Walia
- Rahul Vohra as Shashank Deshmukh
- Jay Upadhyay as Rani's uncle
- Raj Jadon as a Flight reporter
- Aman Kanojia as Vir Mhatre Supporter
- Suriya as an unnamed silk businessman who invested money in Deccan Air (cameo appearance)

== Production ==
=== Development ===
On 12 July 2021, Jyothika and Suriya, owners of 2D Entertainment, announced that their production venture Soorarai Pottru (2020), was to be remade in Hindi. Furthermore, they stated that the director of the original film, Sudha Kongara, would direct the remake and they would collaborate with Vikram Malhotra, of Abundantia Entertainment, to fund it. Reportedly, one of the actors Ajay Devgn, John Abraham, Akshay Kumar and Hrithik Roshan were considered to play the role that Suriya played in the original. The actor was reported to be finalised going by their availability. In August, the co-producer of the original film, Sikhya Entertainment, had approached Madras High Court; as initially the production house was to be co-producing the remake along with 2D Entertainment, however, the latter house sold the rights to Abundantia Entertainment, without the former houses' consent. By early September, the case was closed, with Sikhya Entertainment not involved in the production side. Akshay Kumar was announced on 25 April 2022 to reprise the role played by Suriya. A muhurat puja was held the same day in Mumbai with the presence of the film's cast and crew. Radhika Madan was cast, alongside Kumar. Paresh Rawal, who portrayed the antagonist in Tamil, reprises his role. The official title Sarfira was revealed on 13 February 2024, along with a release date of 12 July 2024.

=== Filming ===
Principal photography began with the first schedule on 25 April 2022 in Mumbai. Madan completed filming her portions by 23 October.

== Music ==
Sarfira

Soundtrack album by G. V. Prakash Kumar, Tanishk Bagchi and Suhit Abhyankar
- Released: 3 July 2024
- Recorded: 2022–2023
- Genre: Feature film soundtrack
- Length: 21:30
- Language: Hindi
- Label: Times Music

Official audio
- Sarfira (Audio Jukebox) on YouTube

The music of the film is composed by G. V. Prakash Kumar while Tanishk Bagchi and Suhit Abhyankar serve as guest composers. The lyrics are written by Manoj Muntashir, Shloke Lal and Tanishk Bagchi. In April 2022, Prakash tweeted that he had completed the first song of the soundtrack. The film marks G. V. Prakash Kumar's second collaboration with Sudha after Soorarai Pottru and his second collaboration with Akshay Kumar after Joker. The music rights were obtained by Junglee Music.

The first single titled "Maar Udi" was released on 24 June 2024. And the second song titled "Khudaya" released on 27 June 2024.

Track listing
No.	Title	Lyrics	Music	Singer(s)	Length
1.	"Maar Udi" (The Spirit of Sarfira)	Manoj Muntashir	G. V. Prakash Kumar	Yadu Krishnan, Sugandh Shekar, Haston Rodrigues, Abhijith Rao	1:23
2.	"Khudaya"	Manoj Muntashir	Suhit Abhyankar	Sagar Bhatia, Neeti Mohan, Suhit Abhyankar	3:36
3.	"Saare Ki"	Tanishk Bagchi	Tanishk Bagchi	Tanishk Bagchi	2:23
4.	"De Taali"	Shloke Lal	Tanishk Bagchi	Tanishk Bagchi	2:32
5.	"Chaawat"	Manoj Muntashir	G. V. Prakash Kumar	Shreya Ghoshal	4:12
6.	"Dhokha"	Manoj Muntashir	G. V. Prakash Kumar	Mika Singh	3:29
7.	"Yeh Kahani"	Manoj Muntashir	G. V. Prakash Kumar	Saindhavi	3:55
Total length:					21:30

== Release ==
=== Theatrical ===
Initially the film was planned for release on 1 September 2023 and then later 16 in February 2024. It was finally released in theatres on 12 July 2024.

=== Home media ===
The film was premiered on Disney+ Hotstar from 11 October 2024.

== Reception ==
On the review aggregator website Rotten Tomatoes, 42% of 12 critics' reviews are positive, with an average rating of 5.3/10.

Bollywood Hungama gave 2.5/5 and wrote "On the whole, Sarfira tells an inspiring story in an engaging manner and rests on Akshay Kumar's strong performance." Titas Chowdhury of News18 rated the film 4.5 stars out of 5 and wrote, "Sudha Kongara's retelling of Soorarai Pottru is as sublime as the original. Sarfira is Akshay Kumar's best performance in recent years." Tushar Joshi of India Today rated the film 4 stars out of 5 and wrote, "Akshay Kumar delights you with his earnest performance" Lachmi Deb Roy of Firstpost rated the film 4 stars out of 5 and wrote, "An inspirational film that will make you cry and clap at the same time!"

Sukanya Verma of Rediff.com rated 2/5 stars and observed "Throughout its 155 minutes, every scene is doused in blaring background music and melodrama. Disappointment alone won't do, it must feel like a full blown catastrophe."

Rishil Jogani of Pinkvilla rated the film 4 stars out of 5 and wrote "Sudha Kongara, Akshay Kumar and Radhikka Madan breach 'Sarfira' heights with their deeply moving and delightfully inspiring aviation-drama, that warrants a watch on the big screen. Don't miss it." Sonal Pandya of Times Now rated the film 3.5 stars out of 5 and wrote "Akshay Kumar's Underdog Remake Retains Its Emotional Impact." Pratikshya Mishra of The Quint rated the film 3.5 stars out of 5 and wrote "Akshay Kumar Truly Gets To Explore His Range After a Long Time."

Saibal Chatterjee of NDTV rated the film 2/5, criticizing the chemistry between Akshay Kumar and Radhika Madan as lacking the compelling quality seen in the performances of Suriya and Aparna Balamurali. According to Chatterjee, this shortcoming affects the film's overall effectiveness. Other elements of the film, such as its direction and technical aspects, have been discussed by critics, resulting in a generally mixed reception from audiences and reviewers.

Dhaval Roy of the Times of India rated the film 3.5 stars out of 5.

Shubhra Gupta of Indian Express rated 2.5/5 and wrote, "The film is only interested in fronting its hero. Akshay Kumar, who is in practically every frame of the film, isn't actively terrible, but he doesn't do anything here that he hasn't done before.

== Box office ==
Sarfira performed poorly at the box office, earning ₹2.5 crore (US$260,000) on the opening day. The film has grossed ₹ 26.3 crore domestically and ₹30.02 crore worldwide. Trade analysts attributed the underperformance to poor marketing and viewers already having seen the original film online.
