= Deccan Charters =

Indian aviation company

IATA	ICAO	Call sign
DN	DKN	DECCAN
- Founded: 1997; 29 years ago
- Hubs: Jakkur Airfield (Bangalore)
- Fleet size: 5
- Parent company: Deccan Charters Pvt Ltd
- Headquarters: Bengaluru, India
- Key people: Captain G. R. Gopinath (Managing Director)
- Website: deccanair.com

Deccan Charters is an aviation company based in Bengaluru, India that operates helicopter and fixed-wing charter services. Its main base is at Jakkur Airfield. Deccan Technical Services, the maintenance unit of Deccan Charters, maintains helicopters on behalf of 50 Indian corporates such as Reliance Industries and Essar Group. Their Mumbai centre is the authorised customer service centre to support Sikorsky S-76 helicopters.

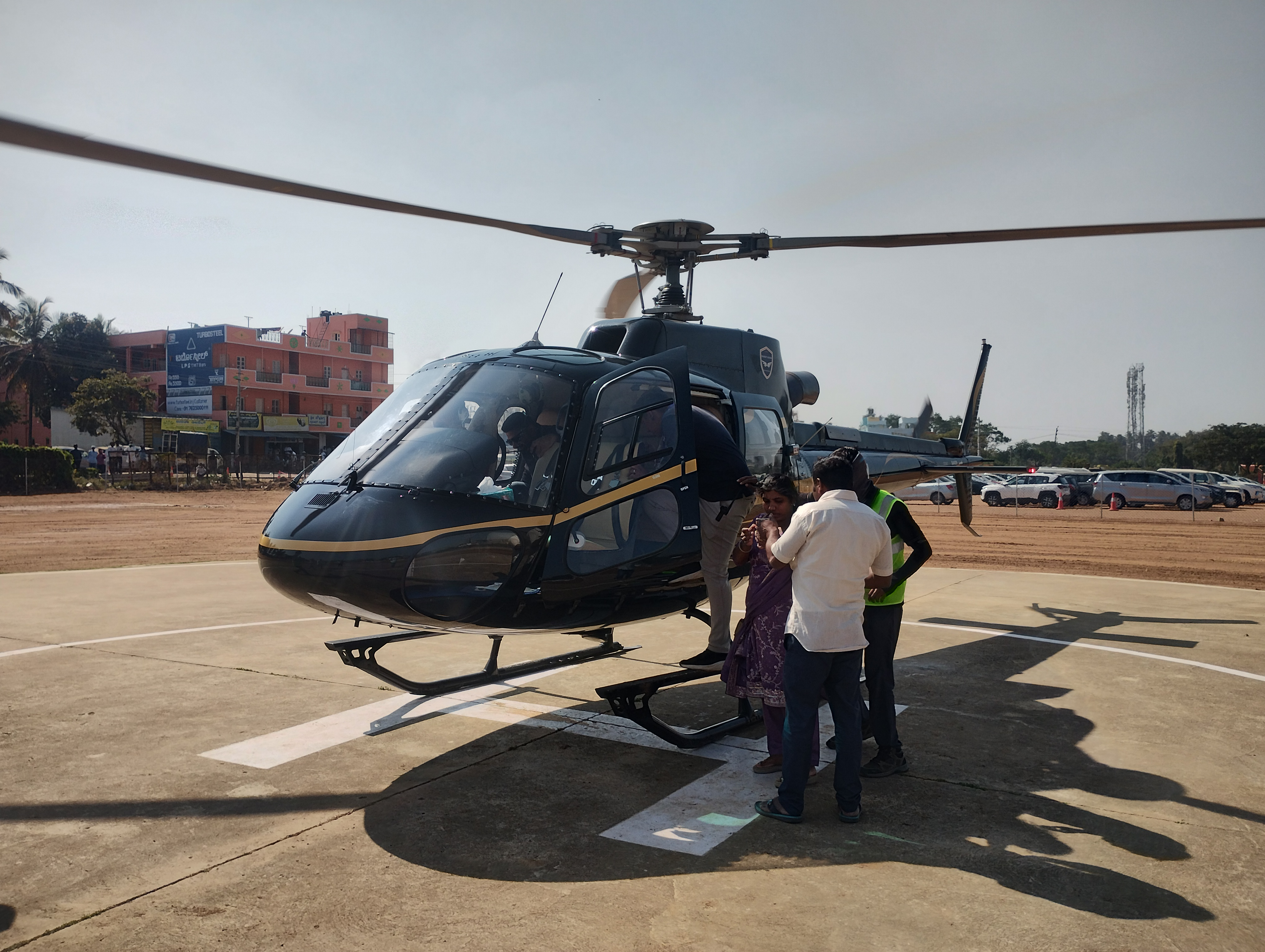
A Deccan Charters helicopter at EXCON 2025 (BIEC)

== History ==
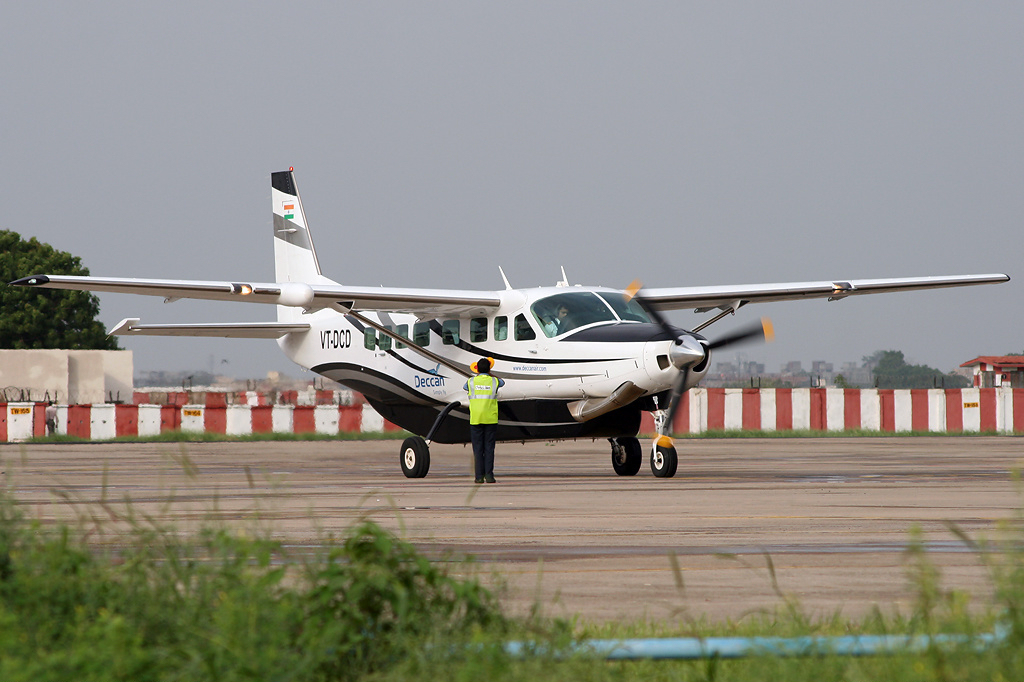
Deccan Shuttles Cessna 208 in August 2012 at Sardar Vallabhbhai Patel International Airport.

The company started operations on 3 December 1997. as Deccan Aviation. It established Simplifly Deccan (formerly named Air Deccan), a low-cost airline in March 2003. In July 2004, Deccan Aviation partnered with the Favourite Group of Sri Lanka to launch a helicopter charter company called Deccan Aviation Lanka. In early 2007, the company started fixed-wing charter operations. Deccan Charters exited from the company in November 2011, after selling their 48% stake to Singapore-based Millennium Aero which renamed the company as Millennium Airlines. In February 2012, Deccan Charters partnered with Taj Air, Bjets and other partners under the Powerfly brand to provide an air charter membership program through which customers can access Jets, Turbo Props and Helicopters. Deccan Charters Ltd. initiated non-scheduled chartered services in Gujarat under the brand name of Deccan Shuttles in August 2012. This service connected Ahmedabad, Surat, Jamnagar, Bhavnagar and Kandla. In April 2013, Deccan announced its decision to suspend all Gujarat operations citing poor patronage. In August 2014, Deccan Charters partnered with Luan Airways for providing medical evacuation services in North-East India.

== Air Deccan ==
In March 2017, the firm was awarded 21 regional air routes under the Indian Government's regional connectivity scheme, UDAN. Deccan Charters decided to use the popular Air Deccan brand to launch these services that will connect emerging towns across Indian states of Meghalaya, Mizoram and Tripura at affordable prices with 19-seater Beechcraft 1900D turboprop aircraft.

Air Deccan received the scheduled commuter operator (SCO) permit from regulator Directorate General of Civil Aviation (DGCA) on 22 December 2017 and the first flight, DN 1320, took off for Jalgaon Airport, from the Chhatrapati Shivaji International Airport (CSIA) the following afternoon. In the first phase of operations, Air Deccan planned to connect to Jalgaon, Nashik and Kolhapur Airport from Mumbai and Pune Airport. However, it could not operate a large number of the RCS routes awarded to it due to the company's weak financials. Scheduled commercial operations were stopped in April 2020 due to the effects of the COVID-19 pandemic and the ensuing lockdown.

== Fleet ==
The Deccan Charters fleet consists of the following fixed-wing aircraft and helicopters:

- Aérospatiale AS-355F Twin Ecureuil
- Bell 206 Jet Ranger
- Bell 206L-3 Long Ranger
- Bell 206L-4 Long Ranger
- Bell 212
- Bell 407
- Schweizer 330
- 2 Pilatus PC-12

Helitourism

Deccan Charters also provides tourism by helicopter.

== Destinations ==
Andhra Pradesh

- Puttaparthi (Helicopter)
- Tirupati (Helicopter)

Delhi

- Delhi

Gujarat

- Surat (Offshore service-Helicopter)

Himachal Pradesh

- Kullu
- Manali (Helicopter)
- Shimla (Helicopter)

Jammu and Kashmir

- Amarnath (Helicopter)
- Katra (Helicopter)
- Vaishno Devi (Helicopter)

Jharkhand

- Jamshedpur

Karnataka

- Bangalore
- Hampi (Helicopter)
- Shravanabelagola (Helicopter)

Kerala

- Cochin
- Trivandrum
- Guruvayur (Helicopter)
- Thekkady (Helicopter)

Madhya Pradesh

- Indore

Odisha

- Bhubaneswar

Tamil Nadu

- Chennai

Telangana

- Hyderabad

Uttrakhand

- Badrinath (Helicopter)
- Kedarnath (Helicopter)

Uttar Pradesh

- Agra (Helicopter)

West Bengal

- Coochbehar
- Kolkata
