= Air Deccan =

Indian regional airline

IATA	ICAO	Call sign
DN	DKN	AIR DECCAN
- Founded: 2017
- Commenced operations: 2017
- Ceased operations: 5 April 2020
- Operating bases: Sardar Vallabhbhai Patel International Airport (Ahmedabad)
- Fleet size: 2
- Destinations: 4
- Parent company: Deccan Charters
- Headquarters: Ahmedabad, Gujarat, India
- Key people: Arun Kumar Singh (CEO)
- Website: https://www.deccanair.com

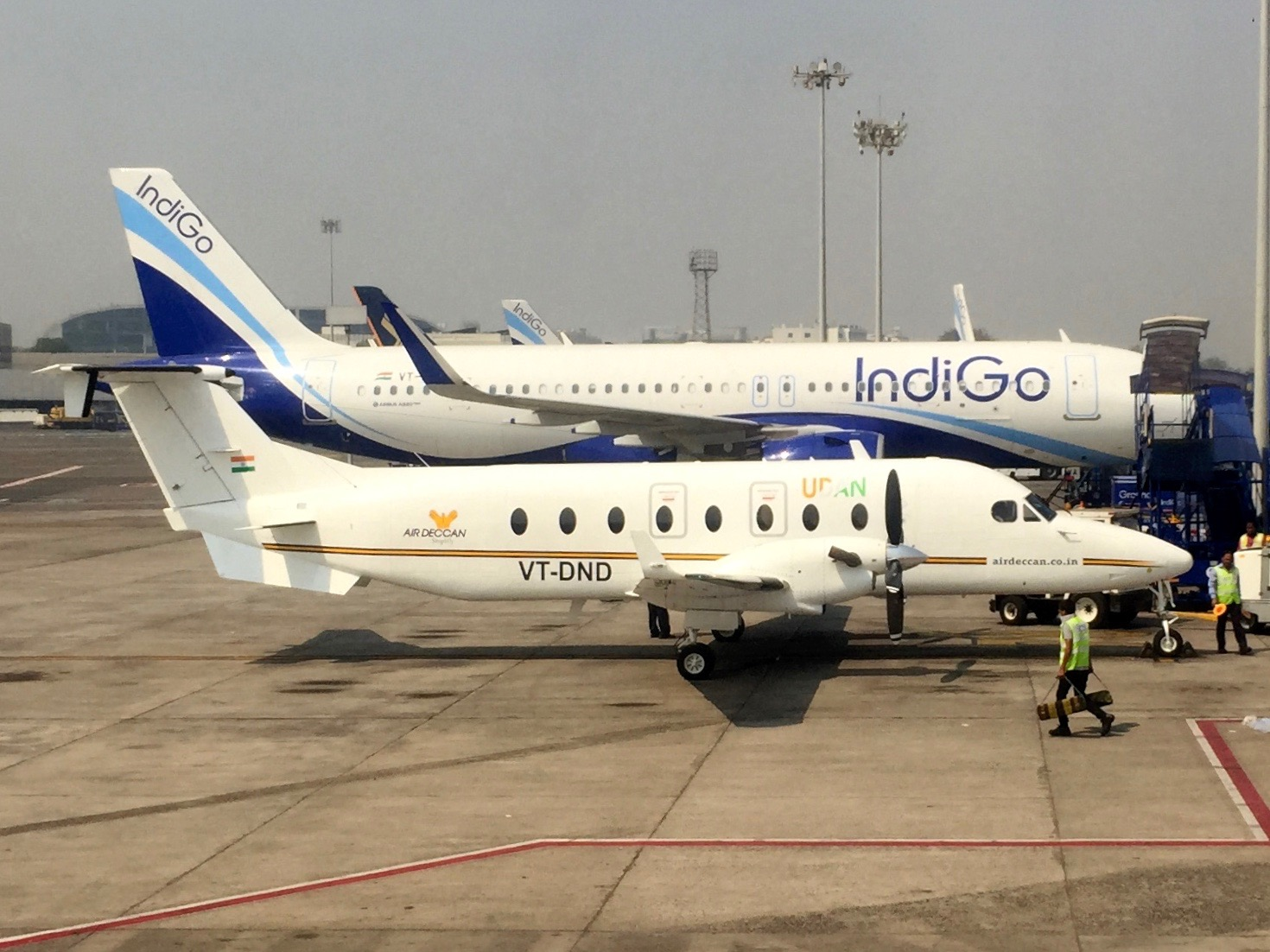
Air Deccan Beechcraft 1900D VT-DND parked at Mumbai airport

Air Deccan was an Indian regional airline operating from Ahmedabad, Gujarat. It flew to a total of four destinations using Beech 1900D aircraft, as of November 2019. On 5 April 2020, the airline ceased operations due to the effects of the COVID-19 pandemic and the ensuing lockdown.

== History ==
Air Deccan was launched by Capt. G.R. Gopinath, the pioneer of low-cost aviation in India, in 2003. In 2007, the airline began incurring losses and was subsequently acquired by Kingfisher Airlines in 2008. The airline was rebranded first as Simplifly Deccan, then as Kingfisher Red. Kingfisher Airlines itself experienced financial difficulties and accumulated significant losses between 2011 and 2012, eventually shutting down due to bankruptcy.

Despite the rebranding, Gopinath retained ownership of the Air Deccan name and registered the trademark shortly after the acquisition. Meanwhile, the Deccan brand continued to be utilized by Gopinath's air-charter and aircraft maintenance company, Deccan Charters, which had been founded in 1997.

In 2017, the new Air Deccan was relaunched with a focus on regional routes around Gujarat and Maharashtra. In March of the same year, the firm was granted permit to conduct flights for 21 regional air routes in the first round of the Indian Government's regional connectivity scheme, UDAN.

On December 22, 2017, Air Deccan received its scheduled commuter operator (SCO) permit from regulator Directorate General of Civil Aviation (DGCA) and its first flight, DN 1320, took off for Jalgaon Airport, from the Chhatrapati Shivaji International Airport (CSIA) the following afternoon. In the first phase of operations, Air Deccan planned to connect to Jalgaon, Nashik and Kolhapur Airport from Mumbai and Pune Airport. However, it could not operate a large number of the RCS routes awarded to it due to the company's weak financials.

Scheduled commercial operations were stopped in April 2020 due to the effects of the COVID-19 pandemic and the ensuing lockdown. As of 2026, the airline remains non-operational.

== Destinations ==
Air Deccan focused on flying to cities with little to no air service where there was minimal competition with major airlines. The airline flew to the following destinations in India:

State	City	Airport	Notes	Refs
Gujarat	Ahmedabad	Sardar Patel International Airport		
Gujarat	Bhavnagar	Bhavnagar Airport		
Gujarat	Diu	Diu Airport		
Gujarat	Mundra	Mundra Airport		

== Legal issues ==
Accessibility in Transport

Significant legal challenges have shaped the accessibility of air travel in India. In 2006, activists Subrata Pramanick and Rajiv Ranjan filed a landmark complaint (Case No. 3197/2006) against Deccan Aviation (Air Deccan) before the Court of the Chief Commissioner for Persons with Disabilities. The case challenged the airline's practice of charging a "wheelchair tax" of ₹500 for mobility assistance. This litigation, cited in the company's 2006 SEBI prospectus, contributed to the eventual mandate that all Indian carriers provide wheelchair assistance to passengers with disabilities free of charge under Civil Aviation Requirements (CAR).

== Fleet ==
The airline utilised two Beech 1900D aircraft as of December 2017, each of which was equipped with 18 seats.

Air Deccan fleet
Aircraft	In service	Passengers
Beechcraft 1900D	2	19
Total	2	
