= Jayantilal Gada =

Indian film producer and distributor (born 1962)

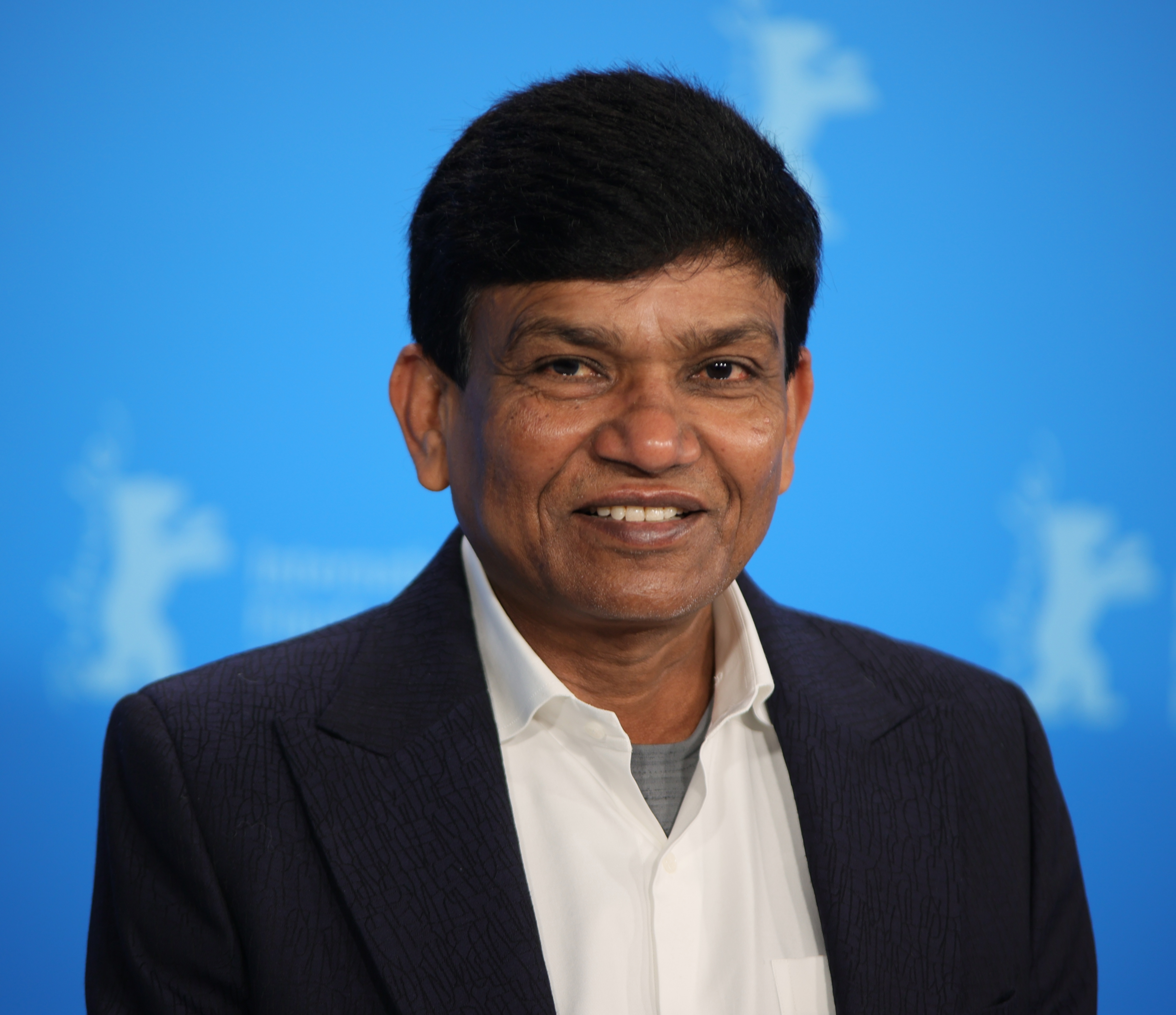
- Born: 31 March 1962 (age 64); Lakadia, Gujarat, India
- Occupation: Producer

Jayantilal Gada is an Indian film producer and distributor. He ventured into film production under his production company, Pen Studios.

He is known for producing the 2013 Hindi-language film Mahabharat, which won Best Animation Film at the 3rd Fiji Film Festival.

He founded the company PEN India (Popular Entertainment Network India, sometimes written as Pen) in 1987; today, the company produces and distributes Bollywood films. Gada retired in 2014 at the age of 52. His son, film and TV producer Dhaval Gada, was announced as his successor at PEN on 3 November 2014. However, Jayantilal Gada resumed office from 1 April 2016.

Gada launched a new television channel named WOW. WOW's content mainly consists of Bollywood songs, classic Bollywood movies, new Hindi and Gujarati movies, Hindi-dubbed South Indian language movies, along with TV series such as Mahabharat.

== Early life and career ==
Jayantilal Gada is a Kutchi Jain Vagad born in Lakadia, Gujarat. He studied till 10th in Gurukul High School, Ghatkopar. He began working in his father's small grocery store, also taking courses in radio repairing and photography.

Gada started a small video library in a section of his father's store, buying video cassettes from producers for distribution. This sideline grew as he first began hiring out video cassette players, then began filming weddings on video. Later, he moved into wholesaling videos. Popular Video Cassette Library was restructured and renamed PEN in 1992. After financial problems, Gada began moving into acquiring the copyright to films – at this stage he was aged 25.

== Move into presentation and production ==
In 2004, Gada acquired the rights to supply Hindi-language feature films to public service broadcaster Doordarshan, beginning with the film Yeh Mera India. He convinced Doordarshan to show the remastered and extended version of the classic action-adventure Sholay, which had record viewing figures despite its long running time. Gada also gained the rights to screen films on Zee.

The Bollywood film Kahaani was produced by Gada and his nephew Kushal Gada. In 2013, he produced the 3D animation film Mahabharat, in which Amitabh Bachchan, Ajay Devgan and Vidya Balan voiced characters. It made the highest box office returns of all animated films produced in India. It was awarded Best Animation Film At the 3rd Fiji Film Festival. PEN also produced the 2014 film Entertainment, starring Akshay Kumar.

Today Pen acquires worldwide rights to Hindi films and supplies them to networks such as Zee, Sony, Sahara One and Star.

== Filmography ==
The following is a list of notable films in which Gada's Pen India Ltd has been involved:

| Year | Film | His Role |
|---|---|---|
| 2008 | Yeh Mera India | |
| 2010 | Kaalo | Presenter |
| 2011 | Chatur Singh Two Star | |
| 2012 | Kahaani | Co-producer |
| 2013 | Issaq | |
| 2013 | Mahabharat | |
| 2013 | Singh Saab The Great | |
| 2014 | Lakshmi | |
| 2014 | Sholay#3D re-release | |
| 2014 | Rang Rasiya | |
| 2014 | Entertainment | |
| 2014 | Ekkees Toppon Ki Salaami | |
| 2015 | P Se PM Tak | |
| 2016 | Mastizaade | |
| 2016 | Do Lafzon Ki Kahani | |
| 2016 | Shivaay | |
| 2018 | Helicopter Eela | |
| 2021 | The Power | |
| 2021 | Bhavai | Presenter |
| 2022 | Khiladi | Presenter |
| 2022 | RRR | Presenter |
| 2022 | Chup: Revenge of the Artist | Co-producer |
| 2022 | Atithi Bhooto Bhava | Presenter |
| TBA | Saharasri | Presenter |
