= Singam (film series) =

Indian film series

Singam Franchise
- Official Logo
- Created by: Hari
- Original work: Singam
- Owners: Sun Pictures; 2D Entertainment; Studio Green

Films and television
- Films: Singam; Singam II; Si3

Singam (transl. Lion) is an Indian Tamil-language action film series centered around the titular character DSP Duraisingam, a short-tempered honest cop with an aim to eliminate corruption from the society. The film series began in 2010 with the release of Singam, directed by Hari and starring Suriya as the titular character. The film received positive reviews and grossed ₹90–100 crore worldwide. The first film also spawned two direct sequels titled Singam II (2013) and Si3 (2017).

== Overview ==
=== Singam ===
Singam, the first installment of the trilogy, tells about DSP Duraisingam, a tempered-but-honest police officer, who tries his best to eliminate an extortionist Mayil Vaaganam. The film was released on 28 May 2010 (worldwide) and received positive reviews from critics. It earned ₹90-100 crore worldwide against a budget of ₹15 crore.

=== Singam 2 ===
Singam 2, the second installment of the trilogy, continues the story, where Duraisingam was sent to Thoothukoodi in order to stop a drug cartel running by a drug lord Bhai and a businessman Thangaraj their international drug cartel leader friend Michael Kong Edwin(aka Danny). The film was released in about 1500 screens worldwide. The film received positive reviews from critics where it grossed approximately ₹1.22 billion (US$13 million) worldwide from Tamil and Telugu versions with a lifetime distributor's share of ₹670 million (US$7.0 million). However, Forbes stated that the film made ₹1.36 billion in its lifetime.

=== Si3 ===
Si3 was the third and final installment of the trilogy, continues the story, where Duraisingam was transferred to Andhra Pradesh as DCP under CBI, to nab an Australian bureaucrat named Vittal Prasad, who illegally exports toxic waste to India. However, unlike the first and second film, the third film mainly received mixed reviews from critics, despite, became a commercial success, thus becoming another profitable addition by grossing ₹110 crore worldwide from a budget of ₹65 crore.

== Films ==
Film	Release date	Director	Screenwriter(s)	Story by	Producer(s)
Singam	28 May 2010	Hari	Hari	Hari	K. E. Gnanavel Raja
Singam II	5 July 2013	Hari	Hari	Hari	S. Lakshman Kumar
Singam 3	9 February 2017	Hari	Hari	Hari	Dhaval Jayantilal Gada, K. E. Gnanavel Raja

Three films of the Singam franchise take place between 2010, 2013 and 2017.

== Remakes ==
The success of the franchise has brought other Indian industries to adapt the films in their languages. Singam (2010) was remade in Kannada as Kempe Gowda, in Hindi as Singham, in Bengali as Shotru, and in Punjabi as Singham. Si3 (2017) was remade in Hindi as Romeo S3.

== Recurring cast and characters ==
This table lists the main characters who appeared multiple times in the franchise.

Actors	Films		
Actors	Singam	Singam II	Si3
Suriya	DCP S. Duraisingam	DCP S. Duraisingam	DCP S. Duraisingam
Anushka Shetty	Kavya Duraisingam	Kavya Duraisingam	Kavya Duraisingam
Prakash Raj	Mayil Vaaganam	Mayil Vaaganam	Mayil Vaaganam
Danny Sapani		Danny (Michael Kong)	Danny (Michael Kong)
Vivek	Erimalai	Erimalai	
Radha Ravi	Soundara Pandi	Soundara Pandi	Soundara Pandi
Sumithra	Kalyani	Kalyani	Kalyani
Vijayakumar	Home Minister Ramanathan	Home Minister Ramanathan	Home Minister Ramanathan
Yuvarani	Dhanalakshmi	Dhanalakshmi	Dhanalakshmi
Nassar	Mahalingam	Mahalingam	Mahalingam
Janaki Sabesh	Bharati Mahalingam	Bharati Mahalingam	Bharati Mahalingam
Manorama	Kavya's Grandmother	Kavya's Grandmother	Kavya's Grandmother
Thyagu	Harbour Shanmugam	Harbour Shanmugam	Harbour Shanmugam
Priya Atlee	Divya Mahalingam	Divya Mahalingam	
Nizhalgal Ravi	ACP Rajendran	ACP Rajendran	
Adithya	Vaikuntam	Vaikuntam	
Item Number		Anjali	Neetu Chandra

== Additional crew and production details ==
Occupation	Film		
Occupation	Singam (2010)	Singam II (2013)	Si3 (2017)
Director	Hari	Hari	Hari
Producer(s)	K. E. Gnanavel Raja; Reliance Big Pictures	S. Lakshman Kumar	K. E. Gnanavel Raja; Dhaval Jayatilal Gada
Executive Producer(s)	S. R. Prabhu; S.R. Prakashbabu; Mahesh Ramanathan	Suriya; Kyle Ambrose; Delon Bakker	S. R. Prabhu; S.R. Prakashbabu
Distributor(s)	Sun Pictures	2D Entertainment	Pen Movies
Story, Screenplay and Dialogue Writer	Hari	Hari	Hari
Music director(s)	Devi Sri Prasad	Devi Sri Prasad	Harris Jayaraj
Cinematography	Priyan	Priyan	Priyan
Editor(s)	V. T. Vijayan	V. T. Vijayan; T. S. Jay	V. T. Vijayan; T. S. Jay
Art Director	K. Kadhir	K. Kadhir	K. Kadhir
Lyricist(s)	Na. Muthukumar; Viveka; Hari; Megha	Viveka	Pa. Vijay; Thamarai; Viveka; Hari; Harris Jayaraj; Ramya NSK; Dinesh Kanagaratnam; Maalavika Manoj; Lady Kash; MC Vickey
Stunt Co-ordinator(s)	Rocky Rajesh; Anal Arasu	Rocky Rajesh; Anal Arasu	Kanal Kannan; Anbariv
Choreographer(s)	Brinda; Shobi; Baba Bhaskar	Raju Sundaram; Robert; Baba Bhaskar	Brinda; Shobi; Baba Bhaskar
Costume Designer(s)	Vivek Karunakaran; Pallavi-Neha; Bharani; Anu	Nikhaar Dhawan; Uma; Chaitanya Rao	Neha Gnanavel Raja; V. Sai

== Release and revenue ==
=== Box office performance ===
The franchise has been notable for its profit, with Singam and its follow-up having earned a combined revenue of ₹336-346 crore, according to IBtimes.

Film	Release date	Budget	Box office revenue	Ref.
Singam	28 May 2010	₹15 crore (US$1.6 million)	₹90-100 crore	
Singam II	5 July 2013	₹45 crore (US$4.7 million)	₹136 crore (US$14 million)	
Si3	9 February 2017	₹65 crore (US$6.7 million)	₹110 crore (US$11 million)	
Total		₹125 crore (US$13 million) (three films)	₹336-346 crore (three films)	

== Reception ==
=== Singam (2010) ===
Sify described the film Singam as a "predictable entertainer that follows the age old formula", while Suriya "carries the film to the winning post. His passion and the way he brings an ordinary regular larger-than-life hero character alive on screen is lesson for other commercial heroes". Rediff felt it was an "unapologetic... entertainer and has Suriya in every frame. Lovers of commercial potpourri will definitely get their money's worth."

=== Singam 2 ===
Rediff felt "the film has a lot of power-packed action sequences and the story races along with a tremendous pace keeping you engaged throughout... The only negative would be the length – the movie runs for almost three hours. A slightly shorter version would have created a greater impact". Deccan Chronicle gave it the verdict: "Even if you are not a Suriya fan, Singam 2 is worth a watch. The film roars rather well." In contrast, Zee News felt, "Suriya is the only character that makes you feel satisfied in the entire movie".

=== Si3 ===
The Times of India lauded Suriya and Hari, writing,"[His] consistency in handling cop stories convincingly and entertainingly needs to be commended as he has been proving his expertise repeatedly". The New Indian Express similarly praised Suriya, but found "as a commercial film director, [Hari's] storytelling methods also suffer from following a set of rules, which include frequent yawn-inducing songs". In contrast, The Hindu felt it was "loud, fast, and without a single memorable moment". Sify called the film "a cocktail of harebrained predictable plot, exhausting action scenes and slapstick comedy".

== In other media ==
In the climax of Karuppu, a 2026 film by RJ Balaji, the deity Kaaval Karuppu, also played by Suriya, arrives in the form of Duraisingam to defeat the antagonist Baby Kannan.
