= House of Lies (disambiguation) =

House of Lies is a 2012 American television series.

House of Lies or The House of Lies may refer to:

== Television ==
- House of Lies (Philippine TV series), a 2026 Philippine television series
- "House of Lies", an episode of Flipping Out
- "House of Lies", an episode of House of Anubis
- "House of Lies", an episode of The Loud House
- "House of Lies", an episode of The Trust: A Game of Greed

== Film ==
- The House of Lies (1916 film), a silent American drama film
- The House of Lies (1926 film), a silent German drama film
- House of Lies (2024 film), an Indian drama-thriller film

== Literature ==
- The House of Lies, a 1960 novel by Mary Howard
