= The Hunt: The Rajiv Gandhi Assassination Case =

- Genre: Crime, Drama
- Based on: Ninety Days: The True Story of the Hunt for Rajiv Gandhi's Assassins by Anirudhya Mitra
- Written by: Rohit G. Banawlikar; Nagesh Kukunoor; Sriram Rajan
- Directed by: Nagesh Kukunoor
- Starring: Amit Sial; Sahil Vaid; Bagavathi Perumal; Girish Sharma
- Music by: Tapas Relia
- Country of origin: India
- Original language: Hindi
- No. of seasons: 1
- No. of episodes: 7

Production
- Executive producer: Moiz Tarwadi
- Producers: Nagesh Kukunoor; Sameer Nair
- Cinematography: Sangram Giri
- Editor: Farooq Hundekar
- Production companies: Applause Entertainment; Kukunoor Movies

Original release
- Network: SonyLIV
- Release: 4 July 2025

The Hunt: The Rajiv Gandhi Assassination Case is a 2025 Indian Hindi-language crime thriller web series streaming on SonyLIV. It was directed by Nagesh Kukunoor and produced by Applause Entertainment and Kukunoor Movies.

It stars Amit Sial, Sahil Vaid, Bagavathi Perumal, and Girish Sharma in major roles. It was released on 4 July 2025. It is based on the book Ninety Days: The True Story of the Hunt for Rajiv Gandhi's Assassins by Anirudhya Mitra.

== Plot ==
The show follows the events surrounding the assassination of former Indian Prime Minister Rajiv Gandhi, who was killed on 21 May 1991 in a suicide bombing carried out by the Liberation Tigers of Tamil Eelam during an election rally at Sriperumbudur in Tamil Nadu. It shows the subsequent high-profile investigation led by a Special Investigation Team of the Central Bureau of Investigation. It delves into the planning of the attack, key members involved, and uncovering of the plot by the investigative team amidst the complex political dynamics at play.

== Cast ==
- Amit Sial as D.R. Karthikeyan
- Sahil Vaid as Amit Verma
- Bagavathi Perumal as K. Ragothaman
- Girish Sharma as Radha Vinod Raju
- Abhishek Shankar as Pakkiriswamy Chandra Sekharan
- Vishwajeet Pradhan as Chandra Shekhar
- Danish Iqbal as Amod Kanth
- Vidyut Gargi as A.K. Raveendran
- Shafeeq Mustafa as Sivarasan
- Anjana Balaji as Nalini
- Vivek Venkatram as Muthusamy
- Gouri Padmakumar as Subha Sundaram
- Sruthy Jayan as Kalaivani Rajaratnam
- Rajiv Kumar as Rajiv Gandhi
- Saurabh Dubey as Vijay Karan
- Akash Sahani as a reporter
- Vishal Saxena as a lab expert
- Rama Rao Jadhav
- Sukanya Nagda
- Ajay Madhok
- Saurabh Dubey
- Apeksha Iyer
- Amol Deshmukh
- Akhil Raj

== Production ==
The series is directed by Nagesh Kukunoor and produced by Applause Entertainment and Kukunoor Movies. It is based on the book Ninety Days: The True Story of the Hunt for Rajiv Gandhi's Assassins by Anirudhya Mitra.

== Release ==
The official trailer was unveiled on 18 June 2025. All the episodes were released on 4 July 2025 on SonyLIV.

== Reception ==
Shubhra Gupta of The Indian Express gave 3.5 stars out of 5 and said that "Amit Sial-Sahil Vaid show is a welcome addition to shows looking back at recent times, which attempt to pin-point historical and political flashpoints in India with archival documentary footage." Dhaval Roy of The Times of India also gave 3.5 stars out of 5 and said that "The series proves that a gripping narrative doesn't require non-stop action to deliver edge-of-the-seat thrills." Anurag Singh Bohra of India Today gave 4 stars out of 5 and commented that "The show is meant for all media professionals, academicians and those inquisitive about politically sensitive events. It also needs to be on the binge-watch list of individuals seeking the truth about India as concerned citizens."

Nandini Ramnath of Scroll.in observed that "The overall feeling is of a job well done, despite the hiccups and the meddling. The motives behind the political double-dealing and Indian links to the storied separatist movement are left to other, more ambitious creators." Vinamra Mathur of Firstpost rated 3/5 stars and writes in his review that "It's also fitting that Kukunoor and his writers Sriram Rajan and Rohit Banawlikar opt for a streaming format to tell this bone-chilling story of a dark chapter in Indian history. But they don't treat the subject as a documentary. It unfolds like a whodunnit. We have been told how it happened." Rahul Desai of The Hollywood Reporter India praise the series and said that "It’s never easy to tell a story that doesn't have the luxury of twists and revelations. Most of us know how it ended, but The Hunt does a solid job of jogging through the timeline with the rigour of a seasoned journalist. The film-making replicates the no-nonsense spirit of its source material: more a true-crime procedural than a fiery op-ed. To understand what the show does right, it’s important to recognise the pitfalls it avoids."

Syes Firdaus Ashraf of rediff.com gave 3.5 stars out of 5 and said that "You are hooked from the first episode." Lakshmi Subramanian of The Week rated 3.5/5 stars and said that "Almost 35 years after the death of former PM Rajiv Gandhi, the seven-episode SonyLiv series based on Anirudhya Mitra’s book and directed by Nagesh Kukunoor makes a gripping watch." Subhash Jha of News 24 gave 4 stars out of 5 and commented that "The Hunt knows which side it is on, but gives us the room to decide where we want to be, not only while watching the series but in the larger picture." Shreyas Pande of Cinema Express rated 3.5/5 stars and said that "The Hunt is at once a textbook investigative thriller and a rarity. It embraces a style that is deeply humbling, returning to the bare necessities of storytelling, and adopts a gaze that is both revelatory and inquisitive."
