= Si3 (film) =

2017 Indian film by Hari

- Theatrical release poster
- Directed by: Hari
- Written by: Hari
- Produced by: K. E. Gnanavel Raja; Dhaval Jayantilal Gada
- Starring: Suriya; Anushka Shetty; Shruti Haasan; Thakur Anoop Singh
- Cinematography: Priyan
- Edited by: V. T. Vijayan
- Music by: Harris Jayaraj
- Production companies: Studio Green; Pen Movies; Aadnah Arts
- Distributed by: Pen India Limited
- Release date: 9 February 2017
- Running time: 154 minutes
- Country: India
- Language: Tamil
- Box office: ₹110 crore

Si3 (short for Singam 3; transl. Lion 3) is a 2017 Indian Tamil-language action thriller film written and directed by Hari. Produced by Studio Green and Aadnah Arts, and distributed by Pen Studios, it is a sequel to Singam II (2013) and the third instalment in the Singam film series. The film stars Suriya reprising his role as S. Duraisingam, alongside Anushka Shetty, Shruti Haasan, Thakur Anoop Singh, Robo Shankar, Soori, Krish, Radikaa Sarathkumar, Sarath Babu and Vijayakumar. In the film, deputy commissioner in Visakhapatnam battles against a criminal operation dealing in deadly toxic waste.

The film was officially announced in October 2014 under the initial official title S3, short for Singam 3; however, it was later changed to Si3 to exploit the Tamil Nadu Government's rule of entertainment tax exemption for films titled in Tamil. Principal photography commenced in January 2016 and ended that October. It was shot primarily in Visakhapatnam. The film's music was composed by Harris Jayaraj, cinematography was handled by Priyan and editing by V. T. Vijayan.

Si3 was released on 9 February 2017 to mixed reviews from critics and grossed ₹110 crore at the box office. The film was remade in Hindi with partial similarities with the screenplay as Romeo S3 (2025).

== Plot ==
Durai Singam, now Deputy Commisioner of Police in Chennai gets transferred to Vishakapatnam in Andhra Pradesh from Tamil Nadu through CBI under request of Andhra Pradesh Home Minister Sathyanarayana to investigate long-pending murder case of Visakhapatnam City Commissioner Ramakrishna. As Singam arrives in Vizag station, he fends off an attack from a thugs of Ravi, who works for Vizag's most influential and powerful don, Madhusudhana Reddy. Singam starts to pretend to be a corrupt cop on a purpose and secretly investigates the murder of the commissioner.

Vidya, a journalist who witnesses Singam's bravery and fending off the thugs, disguised a student to write a story on Singam and follows him. Singam had previously kept his marital status as a secret to protect Kavya who was now his wife, but after curiosity from constable Veeram, he lies and closes it as a divorce, revealing the truth only to Inspector Subba Rao. After briefly confronting Bheemli Selvam one of Reddy's men who was also along with Ravi ordered the attack at the train station, Singam finds that a constable at the station has gotten sick from consuming an expired medicine tablet. With help from a paroled hacker named Murali, Singam tracks Mallaiya, who drove Ramakrishna to Vizag harbour on the night of the murder. A School Headmaster informs Singam that a toxic smoke attack due to burning of wastes from the nearby dump killed his 32 students, including his grandchildren, he complained to Ramakrishna who investigate and learns that, members from Central were involved in illegal dumpings.

Singam realises that Ramakrishna intended to expose illegal dumping of mediwaste and electronic waste, which included recycled expire tablets sold to the public and the smoke attack on the school. The garbage is being imported by Vizag Scraps owner Rajeev Krishna in exchange for free metal scrap delivery to steel companies in Australia. Mallaiya confirms that Reddy, who authorises this business, kills Ramakrishna to prevent him from thwarting his operation and witnessed the murder. Reddy and Rajeev's activities are supervised by a wealthy, powerful and corrupt current Commercial Minister of Australia and business magnate Vittal Prasad, who receives full support from his father, Union Minister Ram Prasad.

Meanwhile, Vidya writes an article on Singam claiming that he extorted Reddy for personal gain and that he is corrupt, putting Singam's reputation on the line. As a result, Singam has Vidya arrested and fined for discrediting him. Singam begins to eliminate and arrest thugs all over the city, including Selvam, whom he guns down, which makes Reddy venegeance on Singam. Later, Singam heads to Vizag harbour to obtain evidence from Reddy's containers, but Reddy's men attack him while Ravi murders the headmaster under Reddy's order. Vittal calls Singam anonymously and threatens to use his influence to kill Singam's family if he doesn't stand down. The next day, Singam chases down Ravi and arrests Reddy. He pays a personal visit to Vittal in Australia as an Industrialist while looking into Reddy's contacts, and confirms that Vittal was the one behind the illegal dumping.

Vittal realises Singam's play and uses his influence which leads Singam being restricted at Airport by Officers and confornting him as Drug dealer framed by Vittal. The airport officers later realise that Singam is one who arrested Danny, the drug dealer who killed several Australian officers before, and the officers apologise to Singam and permit him for returning him back to India. Upon return, Singam he finds that Reddy has been bailed by three criminals under Vittal's plan, who framed the commissioner for supposed assault on one of their wives, and justify the murder as vengeance and defence. Singam is also fired from the CBI for speaking out of turn, but the state Home Minister transfers him as an officer in Vizag to continue pursuing Reddy's men. Left with no choice, Singam exposes the garbage containers to the public, forcing Vittal to arrive at Vizag. When Vittal warns him again to stay out of his way, Singam responds by having Subba Rao kill Reddy, who previously killed his 9-year-old son in a city riot to defend Ram Prasad's position. Singam brings Vittal to his station and gives him another chance to repent. One day, Singam and Kavya visit Thoothukudi to attend the funeral of Kavya's grandmother. Rajeev who follows them later gets arrested. When Vidya who realises Singam and Kavya's marital life attempts to expose Vittal by interviewing him in order to help Singam, but she is assaulted and drugged. Vidya's colleague reaches out to Singam, who contacts Vittal, and the latter demands release of Rajeev in return. With help from Murali, Singam secretly returns to Vizag and rescues Vidya, but is targeted by Vittal's men, who bomb the police station.

Singam decides to finish once and for all and gets an arrest warrant for Vittal to bring him in front of Justice, using computer evidence of agreements signed with medical companies that Murali hacked. The next day, Singam pursues Vittal all the way to Hyderabad Airport in Telangana and has him arrested. While taking Vittal to the police lockup, he escapes police custody and runs into a nearby forest, where Singam catches him and fights with him. After a long fight, Singam chastises Vittal for his greed and lack of remorse. Realizing he will try to escape, Singam shoots and kills Vittal. As the case closes, Singam regains his post in CBI while Ram Prasad is removed from the cabinet position for assisting his son. As Singam returns to Chennai, Kavya is revealed to be 6 months pregnant, and Vidya severs contact with Singam after getting engaged to a good prospect. Singam receives a call from Ramanathan, who may calls him for another mission.

== Cast ==
- Suriya as Durai Singam, Deputy Commissioner of Police in Visakhapatnam
- Anushka Shetty as Kavya Durai Singam, Singam's wife
- Shruti Haasan as Vidya/Agni (Note: Shruti Haasan played a character with two names.)
- Thakur Anoop Singh as Vittal Prasad, an Australian business magnate and bureaucrat (main antagonist)
- Sharat Saxena as Madhusudhana 'M. S.' Reddy (secondary antagonist)
- Soori as Constable Veera Babu
- Robo Shankar as Inspector Subba Rao
- Krish as Inspector V. Sreenivas
- Vijayakumar as Ramanathan, Home Minister of Tamil Nadu
- Suman as Central Aviation Minister Ram Prasad, Vittal's father
- Radhika as Ramakrishna's wife
- Sarath Babu as K. Sathyanarayana Reddy, Home Minister of Andhra Pradesh
- Jayaprakash as Vizag City Police Commissioner Ramakrishna IPS
- Nithin Sathya as Murali
- Radha Ravi as Soundara Pandi, Singam's father
- Nassar as Mahalingam, Kavya's father
- Sumithra as Kalyani, Singam's mother
- Janaki Sabesh as Bharathi, Kavya's mother
- Yuvarani as Dhanalakshmi, Singam's sister
- Manorama as Kavya's grandmother
- Delhi Kumar as Kavya's grandfather
- Imman Annachi as Pushparaj
- Joe Malloori as Government school headmaster
- Prem as Ananda Rao, a customs officer
- Salem Parthiban as Police Officer
- Sarayu as Ananda's wife
- Sandra Amy as Aarthi
- Ilavarasan as ACP Krishnaraj IPS
- Jeeva Ravi as Mallaya, ACP Krishnaraj's driver
- Mohan Raman as Judge
- Chaams as G. Sathyan
- Crane Manohar as Palani, Kavya's houseworker
- Nalini as Thandubazaar Thangam
- Bonda Mani as Thandubazaar Thangam's assistant
- Muthukaalai
- Cool Suresh as Divorcee
- Saran Shakthi as Tea Seller boy
- Boys Rajan as Andhra Today Editor
- Bava Lakshmanan as School Teacher
- Aathma Patrick
- TSR Srinivasan
- M. Kamaraj
- Thyagu as Harbour Shanmugam (cameo appearance)
- Nitu Chandra as a bar dancer, special appearance
- Prakash Raj as Mayil Vaaganam (uncredited, archive footage from Singam)
- Hansika Motwani as Sathya (credited, archive footage from Singam II)
- Danny Sapani as Danny a.k.a. Michael Kong Edwin (uncredited, archive footage from Singam II)

== Production ==
Following the commercial success of Singam II, Hari was keen to collaborate with Suriya for another action film with a fresh script away from the Singam franchise, and agreed terms in principle with the actor in October 2014. Hari revealed that as a result of pressure from those around him, he later developed the one-line story from the film into a script for a third part of Singam. While the first film was primarily shot within Tamil Nadu and the second featured a few scenes in South Africa, Hari stated that the third part would be more "international" and would be set in three countries as the protagonist tackles a global issue.

While most of the cast was from the earlier films were retained, including Anushka Shetty, Shruti Haasan was added to the cast, while Anirudh Ravichander was signed as the music composer replacing Devi Sri Prasad. Anirudh later opted out of the project citing scheduling issues and Harris Jayaraj was brought instead. Vivek, who portrayed the police officer Erimalai in the first two films, declined to reprise his role in this film as he felt he "did not have a meaty role in it". In preparation for his role, Suriya bulked up his physique by spending more hours in the gym and by adopting a strict oil-free diet.

Principal photography, initially scheduled for December 2015, was delayed as a result of the 2015 South India floods. Production eventually began in Visakhapatnam in January 2016, and continued in places including Chennai, Karaikudi and Madurai. In March, the team moved to film song sequences in Romania. After a production break, production resumed in July in Visakhapatnam, before moving to the Talakona Forest region. The team moved to Malaysia in August to film the climax, while filming wrapped in October 2016 with a song shot in Georgia with Suriya and Haasan. In January 2017, the film was re-titled from S3 to Si3 (spelt சி3 in Tamil) to exploit the Tamil Nadu Government's then rule of entertainment tax exemption for films titled in Tamil.

== Soundtrack ==
The soundtrack is scored by Harris Jayaraj, who replaced Devi Sri Prasad as the composer of the film series. The film marks the eighth collaboration between Suriya and Harris after Kaakha Kaakha, Ghajini, Vaaranam Aayiram, Ayan, Aadhavan, 7 Aum Arivu and Maattrraan (2012). The complete album was released on 27 November 2016. While Eros Music is credited as the record label on the audio CDs, Sony Music India is credited on music streaming services.

Reviewing the album, Srivatsan of India Today stated "S3 might not be Harris' best work, but definitely not bad either. Having said that, it's a pucca (transl. Really) commercial album from the composer. Be it the songs or the theme music, the album has enough scope to pander to the B and C centers".

Track listing – Tamil
No.	Title	Lyrics	Singer(s)	Length
1.	"O Sone Sone"	Pa. Vijay, MC Vickey	Javed Ali, Priya Subramaniyan, MC Vickey	5:06
2.	"Mudhal Murai"	Thamarai, Ramya NSK	Harish Raghavendra, Swetha Mohan, Ramya NSK, Karthik	5:05
3.	"Universal Cop"	Viveka, Dinesh Kanagaratnam	Christopher Stanley, Dinesh Kanagaratnam, Krish	4:49
4.	"He's My Hero"	Hari, Maalavika Manoj	Maalavika Manoj	2:31
5.	"Wi Wi Wi WiFi"	Hari, Harris Jayaraj	Karthik, Christopher Stanley, Nikhita Gandhi	4:50
6.	"Mission To Sydney"	Hari, Lady Kash	Lady Kash	2:28
7.	"S3 Vettai Theme"	Hari	MC Vickey	1:32
Total length:				26:21

Track listing – Telugu (Yamudu 3)
No.	Title	Lyrics	Singer(s)	Length
1.	"O Sone Sone"	Vennelakanti, MC Vickey	Javed Ali, Priya Subramaniyan, MC Vickey	5:06
2.	"Musi Musi Navvula"	Sahithi, Ramya NSK	Aalap Raju, Swetha Menon, Ramya NSK, Karthik	5:05
3.	"Universal Cop"	Vennelakanti	Christopher Stanley, Krishna Iyer, Krish	4:49
4.	"He's My Hero"	Rakendu Mouli, Maalavika Manoj	Maalavika Manoj	2:31
5.	"Wi Wi Wi Wi Wifi"	Ramajogayya Sastry	Karthik, Nikhita Gandhi, Christopher Stanley	4:50
6.	"Mission To Sydney"	Hari, Rakendu Mouli, Lady Kash	Lady Kash	2:28
7.	"S3 Vetta (Theme Music)"	Rakendu Mouli	MC Vickey	1:32
Total length:				26:21

== Release ==
Si3 went through several postponments before being released on 9 February 2017. The film was initially scheduled to release on 16 December 2016, but at the request of the makers of the Telugu film Dhruva, the release date was pushed to 23 December. However, it was delayed indefinitely after the team chose to allow the public of Tamil Nadu more time to recuperate from the aftermath of Cyclone Vardah and problems caused by the 2016 Indian banknote demonetisation. Prior to the film's revised release date of 26 January 2017, PETA India alleged that Suriya was trying to garner publicity for Si3 by speaking out against the organisation at the 2017 pro-jallikattu protests. Suriya subsequently filed a legal notice against PETA for the defamatory allegations. The film was pushed back even further following riots in Chennai at the end of the protests, with the producers finalising a worldwide theatrical release date of 9 February. The film had its television premiere on 1 January 2018 via Sun TV.

== Reception ==
=== Critical response ===
Thinkal Menon of The Times of India gave 3/5 stars and wrote "Suriya, who carries the entire film on his shoulders, is in full form. This time, too, his mission ends leaving a hint that the franchise is here to stay." Manoj Kumar. R of The New Indian Express gave 3/5 and wrote "Hari maintains a sense of urgency in his films from the beginning to end, but, as a commercial film director, his storytelling methods also suffer from following a set of rules, which include frequent yawn-inducing songs, but he makes up for that formulaic approach with fast-paced narration in the scenes that follows". Baradwaj Rangan, writing for The Hindu, gave 2/5 and wrote "Loud, fast and without a single memorable moment. The Singam series is the last place to be complaining about the villain." Sify wrote, "Si3 is a cocktail of harebrained predictable plot, exhausting action scenes, slapstick comedy and a bunch of characters that are entirely forgettable, while concluding it as "loud and exhausting."

=== Box office ===
Si3 collected ₹20 crore (US$2.1 million) in domestic box office on its opening day and ₹50 crore (US$5.3 million) in 5 days of release. It collected ₹62 crore (US$6.6 million) at the worldwide box office in its opening four-day weekend. The film achieved the ₹100 crore (US$11 million) benchmark worldwide in 6 days.
