= Pen Studios =

Indian entertainment company

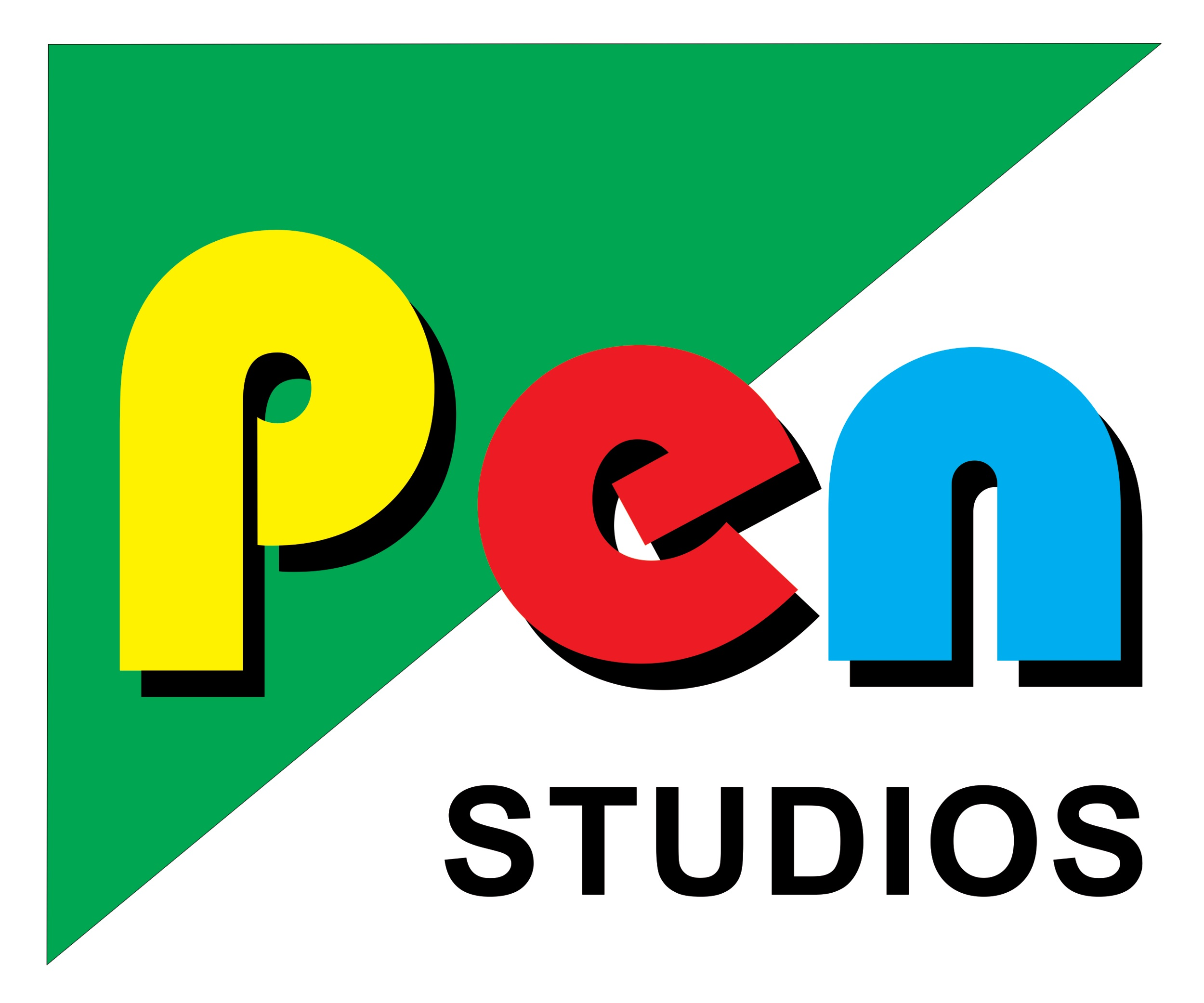
- Type: Private
- Industry: Entertainment
- Founded: 31 March 1983 (43 years ago)
- Founder: Jayantilal Gada
- Headquarters: Mumbai, Maharashtra, India
- Key people: Jayantilal Gada
- Products: Films, music
- Services: Film production Film distribution
- Owner: Jayantilal Gada
- Website: penstudios.in

Pen Studios (formerly Popular Entertainment Network) is an Indian film production and distribution company established by Dr. Jayantilal Gada on 31 March 1983. Based in Mumbai, it mainly produces and distributes Hindi, Tamil, Telugu and Malayalam films. In 1992, the business was restructured under the name Popular Entertainment Network, and began to acquire video rights for movies to be distributed over various media such as video cassettes, satellites, terrestrial platforms, etc. The company subsequently forayed into theatrical and distribution rights of movies.

In the past few years, Pen Studios has produced films such as Kahaani and Shivaay that have met success at the box office. The company is also expanding into producing more regional content.

Pen India Limited launched a new television channel named WOW. WOW's content library consists of Hindi films and music, Gujarati and Hindi-dubbed (Telugu, Tamil, Malayalam and Kannada) films, and TV series such as Mahabharat.

== Initial years ==
Dr. Jayantilal Gada started as a small-time entrepreneur with a video library called Popular Video Cassette Co in 1984. Later, he went into trading of video rights and distribution of VHS tapes across India by establishing Asia's biggest video shop, "Popular Video", at Lamington Road, Mumbai.

== Brief history ==
Restructured and formed Popular Entertainment Network Limited (with brand name 'PEN') in 1992 and started dealing in copyrights of Hindi feature films viz. video, satellite and Doordarshan (DD).

In 1995, PEN created another landmark by telecasting Sholay 20 years after its theatrical release on Doordarshan and creating a record with the highest ever television viewing ratings (76 TRPs) with about 7.5 crore revenues.

Daughter Bhavita Jayantilal Gada also joined PEN in 2006 and started an animation division with mega projects like Mahabharat.

In 2009, son Dhaval Gada, after completing his course at Whistling Woods International Institute, joined PEN to streamline production activities.

== Film history ==
In 2012, PEN's maiden production Kahaani with Sujoy Ghosh proves successful at the box office.

In 2013, PEN released three projects: Issaq, released all over India in 900 theatres. Singh Saab the Great on 1970 screens in India. Mahabharat 3D animation feature film also released in 300 theatres.

In 2014, PEN completed and finally released Sholay 3D in 780 theatres in India. PEN also co-produces and distributes Nagesh Kukunoor's Art House film Lakshmii on 82 screens, Entertainment in 3,200 screens worldwide. PEN also distributed and released Ekkees Toppon Ki Salaami on 490 screens and Ketan Mehta's Rang Rasiya on 890 screens.

PEN has been associated in the past with films such as Sauda (1995), Kohram (1999), Lal Baadshah (1999), Kitne Door Kitne Paas (2002), Shararat (2002), and Yeh Mera India (2009) as rights holders and not as a production.

== TV Channels ==
=== On air channels ===
| Channel | Launched | Language | Category | SD/HD availability | Notes |
|---|---|---|---|---|---|
| All Time Movies | Hindi | Movies | SD | Replaced by Dhinchaak (owned by Goldmines Telefilms) | |

=== Defunct channels ===
| Channel | Launched | Closed | Language | Category | Notes |
|---|---|---|---|---|---|
| MTunes HD | 2011 | 2017 | Hindi | Music | Replaced as WOW Music |
| WOW Music | 2018 | 2019 | Hindi | Music | Replaced as I Love |
| I Love | 2019 | 2021 | Hindi | Music | |
| BFlix Movies | 2016 | 2024 | Hindi | Movies | |

== Filmography ==
Key
| † | Denotes films that have not yet been released |

=== Production ===
| Year | Film | Cast |
|---|---|---|
| 2008 | Yeh Mera India | Anupam Kher, Purab Kohli |
| 2010 | Kaalo | Swini Khara |
| 2011 | Chatur Singh Two Star | Sanjay Dutt, Ameesha Patel |
| 2012 | Kahaani | Vidya Balan, Nawazuddin Siddiqui |
| 2013 | Issaq | Prateik Babbar, Amyra Dastur, Ravi Kishan |
| 2013 | Mahabharat | Ajay Devgan, Anil Kapoor |
| 2013 | Singh Saab The Great | Sunny Deol, Urvashi Rautela, Prakash Raj |
| 2014 | Lakshmi | Nagesh Kukunoor, Monali Thakur |
| 2014 | Sholay 3D | Dharmendra, Amitabh Bachchan |
| 2014 | Rang Rasiya | Randeep Hooda, Nandana Sen |
| 2014 | Entertainment | Akshay Kumar, Tamannaah |
| 2014 | Ekkees Toppon Ki Salaami | Anupam Kher, Neha Dhupia |
| 2015 | P Se PM Tak | Meenakshi Dixit |
| 2015 | Singh Is Bliing | Akshay Kumar, Amy Jackson, Lara Dutta |
| 2016 | Rajini Murugan | Sivakarthikeyan, Keerthy Suresh, Rajkiran, Soori, Samuthirakani |
| 2016 | Mastizaade | Sunny Leone, Tusshar Kapoor |
| 2016 | Do Lafzon Ki Kahani | Randeep Hooda, Kajal Aggarwal |
| 2016 | Wah Taj | Shreyas Talpade, Manjari Phadnis |
| 2016 | Shivaay | Ajay Devgn, Sayyeshaa Saigal |
| 2016 | Kahaani 2: Durga Rani Singh | Vidya Balan, Arjun Rampal |
| 2016 | Nagarahavu | Vishnuvardhan |
| 2017 | Commando 2: The Black Money Trail | Vidyut Jamwal, Adah Sharma Esha Gupta |
| 2017 | Machine | Mustafa Burmawala, Kiara Advani, Ronit Roy |
| 2017 | Si3 | Suriya, Anushka Shetty, Shruti Haasan, Thakur Anoop Singh |
| 2017 | Haseena Parkar | Shraddha Kapoor, Siddhanth Kapoor, Ankur Bhatia, Rajesh Tailang |
| 2018 | Aiyaary | Sidharth Malhotra, Manoj Bajpai, Rakul Preet Singh |
| 2018 | GujjuBhai - Most Wanted | Siddharth Randeria, Jimit Trivedi |
| 2018 | Mercury | Prabhu Deva |
| 2018 | Yamla Pagla Deewana: Phir Se | Dharmendra, Sunny Deol, Bobby Deol, Kriti Kharbanda |
| 2018 | Helicopter Eela | Kajol, Riddhi Sen, Tota Roy Chowdhury, Neha Dhupia |
| 2018 | Namaste England | Arjun Kapoor, Parineeti Chopra, Kishore Bhatt, Aditya Seal |
| 2018 | Sandakozhi 2 | Vishal, Rajkiran, Keerthy Suresh, Varalaxmi Sarathkumar |
| 2019 | The Accidental Prime Minister | Anupam Kher, Akshaye Khanna |
| 2019 | Total Dhamaal | Ajay Devgn, Madhuri Dixit, Anil Kapoor, Riteish Deshmukh, Arshad Warsi, Javed Jaffrey |
| 2019 | Mere Pyare Prime Minister | Anjali Patil, Om Kanojiya, Makrand Deshpande, Rasika Agashe |
| 2019 | Yeh Saali Aashiqui | Vardhan Puri, Shivaleeka Oberoi |
| 2020 | Gul Makai | Reem Shaikh, Atul Kulkarni, Divya Dutta, Mukesh Rishi, Pankaj Tripathi |
| 2021 | The Power | Vidyut Jammwal, Shruti Haasan |
| 2021 | Kya Meri Sonam Gupta Bewafa Hai? | Jassie Gill, Surbhi Jyoti |
| 2021 | Bhavai | Pratik Gandhi, Aindrita Ray |
| 2022 | Khiladi | Ravi Teja, Arjun Sarja, Unni Mukundan, Meenakshi Chaudhary, Dimple Hayathi |
| 2022 | Gangubai Kathiawadi | Alia Bhatt |
| 2022 | Attack: Part 1 | John Abraham, Jacqueline Fernandez, Rakul Preet Singh |
| 2022 | Chup: Revenge of the Artist | Sunny Deol, Dulquer Salmaan, Shreya Dhanwanthary, Pooja Bhatt |
| 2023 | Pathu Thala | Silambarasan, Gautham Karthik |
| 2023 | Chatrapathi | Bellamkonda Sreenivas, Nushrratt Bharuccha |
| 2025 | Romeo S3 | Thakur Anoop Singh, Palak Tiwari |
| 2025 | Controll | Thakur Anoop Singh, Rohit Roy, Priya Anand |
| 2025 | Kumki 2 | Mathi, Arjun Das, Shrita Rao |
| 2026 | Charak: Fair of Faith | Anjali Patil, Subrata Dutta, Sahidur Rahaman, Shashi Bhushan, Nalneesh Neel, Koushik Kar, Sreya Bhattacharya, Sushmita Sur, Debdas Ghosh, Shankhadeep, Shounak Shyamal |
| 2026 | Bharat Bhhagya Viddhaata | Kangana Ranaut, Girija Oak, Smita Tambe, Prasad Oak, Amruta Namdev Patil, Esha Dey, Priya Berde, Asha Shelar, Suhita Thatte, Rasika Agashe |
| 2026 | Daayra | Kareena Kapoor, Prithviraj Sukumaran |
| 2027 | Tumbbad 2 † | Sohum Shah, Nawazuddin Siddiqui, Alia Bhatt |

=== Distribution ===
| Year | Film | Cast |
|---|---|---|
| 2018 | Zero | Shah Rukh Khan, Anushka Sharma, Katrina Kaif |
| 2019 | Badla | Taapsee Pannu, Amitabh Bachchan |
| 2019 | Annabelle Comes Home | Mckenna Grace, Madison Iseman, Katie Sarife, Vera Farmiga, Patrick Wilson |
| 2019 | Knives Out | Daniel Craig, Chris Evans, Ana de Armas, Jamie Lee Curtis, Michael Shannon, Don Johnson, Toni Collette, LaKeith Stanfield, Katherine Langford, Jaeden Martell, Christopher Plummer |
| 2019 | Judgementall Hai Kya | Kangana Ranaut, Rajkummar Rao |
| 2019 | Jabariya Jodi | Sidharth Malhotra, Parineeti Chopra |
| 2019 | Dream Girl | Ayushmann Khurana, Nushrat Bharucha |
| 2019 | Satellite Shankar | Sooraj Pancholi |
| 2019 | Marjaavaan | Sidharth Malhotra, Tara Sutaria, Riteish Deshmukh |
| 2019 | Bombshell | Charlize Theron, Nicole Kidman, Margot Robbie |
| 2020 | Jawaani Jaaneman | Saif Ali Khan, Alaya F |
| 2020 | Love Aaj Kal | Kartik Aaryan, Sara Ali Khan, Randeep Hooda, Aarushi Sharma |
| 2020 | Kaamyaab | Sanjay Mishra |
| 2020 | Angrezi Medium | Irrfan Khan, Deepak Dobriyal, Radhika Madan, Kareena Kapoor Khan |
| 2021 | Chehre | Amitabh Bachchan, Emraan Hashmi |
| 2022 | RRR | NTR Jr., Ram Charan, Alia Bhatt, Olivia Morris, Ajay Devgn |
| 2022 | Vikram | Kamal Haasan, Vijay Sethupathi, Fahadh Faasil, Suriya |
| 2022 | Vikram Vedha | Saif Ali Khan, Hrithik Roshan |
| 2022 | Bhediya | Varun Dhawan, Kriti Sanon, Abhishek Banerjee, Paalin Kabak, Deepak Dobriyal |
| 2022 | Cirkus | Ranveer Singh, Varun Sharma, Pooja Hegde, Jacqueline Fernandez |
| 2023 | Zara Hatke Zara Bachke | Vicky Kaushal, Sara Ali Khan |
| 2023 | Satyaprem Ki Katha | Kartik Aaryan, Kiara Advani |
| 2023 | Ghoomer | Abhishek Bachchan, Saiyami Kher, Shabana Azmi |
| 2023 | Dream Girl 2 | Ayushman Khurana, Ananya Panday, Paresh Rawal, Annu Kapoor, Vijay Raaz |
| 2023 | Jawan | Shah Rukh Khan, Vijay Sethupathi, Nayanthara |
| 2023 | Sukhee | Shilpa Shetty |
| 2023 | The Vaccine War | Nana Patekar, Pallavi Joshi |
| 2023 | Ghost | Shiva Rajkumar, Jayaraj, Anupam Kher |
| 2023 | Sajini Shinde Ka Viral Video | Nimrat Kaur, Radhika Madan, Bhagyashree, Subodh Bhave |
| 2023 | Jigarthanda DoubleX | Raghava Lawrence, S. J. Suryah |
| 2023 | Dunki | Shah Rukh Khan, Taapsee Pannu, Vikram Kochhar, Anil Grover, Boman Irani, Vicky Kaushal |
| 2024 | Main Atal Hoon | Pankaj Tripathi |
| 2024 | Merry Christmas | Katrina Kaif, Vijay Sethupathi |
| 2024 | Teri Baaton Mein Aisa Uljha Jiya | Shahid Kapoor, Kriti Sanon |
| 2024 | Kaagaz 2 | Anupam Kher, Satish Kaushik, Darshan Kumar |
| 2024 | Crew | Tabu, Kareena Kapoor Khan, Kriti Sanon |
| 2024 | The Three Musketeers: Milady | François Civil, Vincent Cassel, Pio Marmaï, Romain Duris, Eva Green |
| 2024 | Chandu Champion | Kartik Aaryan, Vijay Raaz |
| 2024 | Munjya | Sharvari, Abhay Verma |
| 2024 | Ishq Vishk Rebound | Rohit Saraf, Pashmina Roshan, Jibraan Khan, Naila Grrewal |
| 2024 | Hindustani 2 | Kamal Haasan |
| 2024 | Sarfira | Akshay Kumar, Paresh Rawal, Radhika Madan |
| 2024 | Ulajh | Janhvi Kapoor, Roshan Mathew, Gulshan Devaiah, Adil Hussain |
| 2024 | Auron Mein Kahan Dum Tha | Ajay Devgn, Tabu, Jimmy Sheirgill |
| 2024 | Stree 2 | Rajkummar Rao, Shraddha Kapoor, Pankaj Tripathi, Abhishek Banerjee, Aparshakti Khurana |
| 2024 | The Buckingham Murders | Kareena Kapoor Khan |
| 2024 | Bhaiyya Ji | Manoj Bajpayee |
| 2024 | Kahan Shuru Kahan Khatam | Dhvani Bhanushali, Aashim Gulati |
| 2024 | Amaran | Sivakarthikeyan, Sai Pallavi |
| 2024 | Kanguva | Suriya, Bobby Deol, Disha Patani |
| 2025 | Chhaava | Vicky Kaushal, Rashmika Mandanna, Akshaye Khanna |
| 2025 | Sikandar | Salman Khan, Sathyaraj, Rashmika Mandana |
| 2025 | Retro | Suriya, Pooja Hegde |
| 2025 | Thug Life | Kamal Haasan, Silambarasan TR, Trisha Krishnan, Aishwarya Lekshmi, Abhirami |
| 2025 | Bhool Chuk Maaf | Rajkummar Rao, Wamiqa Gabbi, Seema Pahwa, Sanjay Mishra, Raghubir Yadav, Zakir Hussain |
| 2025 | Housefull 5 | Akshay Kumar, Riteish Deshmukh, Abhishek Bachchan, Jacqueline Fernandez, Sonam Bajwa, Nargis Fakhri, Dino Morea, Sanjay Dutt, Jackie Shroff, Nana Patekar, Chitrangda Singh, Fardeen Khan, Chunky Panday, Johnny Lever, Shreyas Talpade, Ranjeet, Soundarya Sharma, Nikitin Dheer |
| 2025 | Coolie | Rajinikanth, Nagarjuna, Upendra, Shruti Haasan, Soubin Shahir, Aamir Khan |
| 2025 | Lokah Chapter 1: Chandra | Kalyani Priyadarshan, Naslen, Sandy, Arun Kurian, Chandu Salim Kumar |
| 2026 | Vadh 2 | Sanjay Mishra, Neena Gupta, Kumud Mishra, Amitt K. Singh, Akshay Dogra, Shilpa Shukla, Yogita Bihani |
| 2026 | O'Romeo | Shahid Kapoor, Nana Patekar, Triptii Dimri, Tamannaah Bhatia, Vikrant Massey, Avinash Tiwary, Disha Patani, Farida Jalal, Aruna Irani, Hussain Dalal, Rahul Deshpande |
| 2026 | Do Deewane Seher Mein | Siddhant Chaturvedi, Mrunal Thakur, Ila Arun, Joy Sengupta, Ayesha Raza, Viraj Gehlani, Sandeepa Dhar, Deepraj Rana, Mona Ambegaonkar, Achint Kaur, Naveen Kaushik, Inesh Kotian |
| 2026 | Bhooth Bangla | Akshay Kumar, Paresh Rawal, Rajpal Yadav, Tabu, Wamiqa Gabbi, Asrani, Manoj Joshi, Jisshu Sengupta, Mithila Palkar, Rajesh Sharma |
| 2026 | Dhabkaaro | Deven Bhojani, Aarjav Trivedi, Tejal Panchasara, Kumud Mishra, Ami Trivedi, Sanjay Goradia |
| 2026 | Patriot | Mammootty, Mohanlal, Fahadh Faasil, Kunchacko Boban, Nayanthara, Revathi |
| 2026 | Karuppu | Suriya, RJ Balaji, Trisha Krishnan |
| 2026 | Drishyam 3 | Mohanlal, Meena, Asha Sharath, Ansiba Hassan, Esther Anil, Murali Gopy, Siddique |
| 2026 | Balan: The Boy | Adhisheshan K R., Farzana Palathingal, Muhammed Zinaan, Dolly June, Jean Paul Lal, Girish A. D., Beena Antony |
| 2026 | Awarapan 2 | Emraan Hashmi, Disha Patani, Shabana Azmi, Suvinder Vicky, Vijayant Kohli, Atul Kumar, Aniruddh Rawal, Puran Gabbi |
| 2026 | I'm Game | Dulquer Salmaan, Kayadu Lohar, Mysskin, Antony Varghese, Samyuktha Viswanathan, Vinay Forrt, Kathir |
| 2026 | Haiwaan | Akshay Kumar, Saif Ali Khan, Shriya Pilgaonkar, Saiyami Kher, Boman Irani, Sharib Hashmi, Rajpal Yadav, Rajesh Sharma, Manoj Joshi, Pahal Chaudhary |
| 2026 | The Vvaan: Force of the Forrest | Sidharth Malhotra, Tamannaah Bhatia, Maniesh Paul, Sunil Grover, Shweta Tiwari, Anup Soni |
| 2026 | Jailer 2 | Rajinikanth, S. J. Suryah, Suraj Venjaramoodu, Vidya Balan, Mithun Chakraborty, Ramya Krishnan |
| 2026 | Pehla Pyaar Doosri Baar | Alisha Chopra, Sparsh Walia, Sakshi Vaidya, Kunal Vaid, Sargun Kaur Luthra, Thushar Chhibber |
| 2026 | Tu Hai Meri Kiran | Sonakshi Sinha, Zaheer Iqbal, Ankit Gupta, Sherlin Seth, Zarina Wahab, Purnendu Bhattacharya |
| 2026 | Party Animals | Viraj Ghelani, Arjun Tanwar, Pragati Nagpal, Jaanyaa Joshi, Naqiyah Haji, Soundous Moufakir, Simona J, Anil Charanjeett, Alam Khan, Saqib Ayub, Vijay Patkar, Kamlesh Sawant, Moses Koul, Aaron Arjun Koul, Rohan Khurana, Suresh Menon, Brijendra Kala, Pradeep Kabra, Aryan Prajapati, Visshesh Tiwari, Anang Desai, Chhaya Vora, Manoj Joshi, Samir Soni |
| 2026 | O.M: Operation Mole | Dhanush, Mammootty, Sai Pallavi, Sreeleela |
| 2026 | Gunmaaster G9 † | Emraan Hashmi, Genelia D'Souza, Aparshakti Khurana, Abhishek Singh, Avneet Kaur, Snehil Dixit Mehra, Inayat Verma |
| 2026 | King † | Shah Rukh Khan, Suhana Khan, Deepika Padukone, Abhishek Bachchan, Anil Kapoor, Jackie Shroff, Arshad Warsi, Rani Mukerji, Raghav Juyal, Abhay Verma, Saurabh Shukla, Jaideep Ahlawat, Akshay Oberoi, Karanvir Malhotra |
| 2027 | Love & War † | Ranbir Kapoor, Alia Bhatt, Vicky Kaushal |
| 2027 | Hero Ki Horrorine † | Yashvardhan Ahuja, Nitanshi Goel, Sunita Ahuja, Jamie Lever, Chunky Panday, Brijendra Kala, Simrat Kaur |
| 2027 | Aisi Deewangi Dekhi Nahi Kahin † | Subhaan Nadiadwala, Airah Bose Roy |
