= Smilie Suri =

Actress

- Born: Mumbai, India
- Occupation: Actress
- Years active: 2005–2024
- Relatives: Bhatt family

Smilie Suri or Smiley Suri is an Indian actress who appeared in Hindi films. Suri made her debut with the 2005 film, Kalyug, which was directed by her brother, Mohit Suri. The film turned out to be a certified box office huge success.

== Career ==
Smiley worked with the director during the making of the 2005 film, Zeher, which turned out to be a moderate success. She debuted in Yeh Mera India and joined Crook for a cameo.

== Personal life ==
Smiley's maternal uncles are Mahesh Bhatt and Mukesh Bhatt while her first cousins are actors Emraan Hashmi, Pooja Bhatt, Alia Bhatt and Rahul Bhatt. Suri is very close to her elder brother Mohit and to her nephew, Ayaan Hashmi, the son of her cousin, Emraan Hashmi, and his wife, Parveen. She is a trained dancer and was training for the Olympics, before she was offered Kalyug in 2005 and became an actress. Suri was with Hindi choreographer Shiamak Davar's group for five years and has also been trained by Sandeep Soparrkar. She has also learnt Kathak from Kathak guru, Vijayshree Choudhary.

Smilie married Vineet Bangera in July 2014, however, both of them divorced later on.

== Filmography ==
=== Films ===
Year	Film	Role	Other notes
2005	Kalyug	Renuka	credited as Smilie
2006	Teesri Aankh: The Hidden Camera	Victim	Friendly appearance
2008	Yeh Mera India	Asha Ambedkar	
2010	Crook	Sheena	Special appearance, credited as Smilee Suri
2011	Crackers	Kate	Voice
2015	Downtown	Anushka	
2024	House of Lies	Ragini Pinto	Zee5

=== Television ===
Year	TV Show	Role
2013	Jodha Akbar	Ruqaiya Sultan Begum
2015	Nach Baliye 7	With husband Vineet Bangera
