= House of Lies (2024 film) =

- Directed by: Saumitra Singh
- Written by: Abhi Raj Sharma
- Starring: Sanjay Kapoor; Ajitesh Gupta; Hiten Paintal; Mir Sarwar; Girish Sharma; Simran Suri; Smilie Suri
- Release date: 31 May 2024
- Country: India
- Language: Hindi

House of Lies is a 2024 Bollywood drama-thriller film directed by Saumitra Singh. It stars Sanjay Kapoor, Ajitesh Gupta, Hiten Paintal and Girish Sharma in the lead roles. Sanjay Kapoor plays as a special investigation officer Rajveer Singh Chaudhary in the film.

== Cast ==
- Sanjay Kapoor as Rajveer Singh Chaudhary
- Ajitesh Gupta as Zaid Ali
- Hiten Paintal as Abhay Mathur
- Girish Sharma as Anthony
- Simran Suri as Shashi
- Smilie Suri as Ragini Pinto
- Simran Suri as Ed Officer

== Plot ==
Rajveer Choudhary, played by Sanjay Kapoor, shows up at the Pinto residence to check out the case. He finds out that Albert's friends and family all have reasons to want him gone. Apparently, Albert left behind a hefty sum of 35 crore in cryptocurrency, catching the eye of the Enforcement Directorate (ED), with Officer Shashi, played by Simran Kaur Suri, getting involved too. But as they question the suspects, the story behind Albert's death becomes more confusing.

== Reception ==
Archika Khurana from The Times of India rated 2/5 stars and shared her review "House of Lies offers nothing new. If anything, it bores you and makes you smirk at places where it tries, and fails, to keep you glued to the whodunnit thriller. The film's premise isn't unfamiliar, but its execution and predictable plot ruin the entire experience."

Pushpangi Raina from Outlook Magazine rated the film 2/5 stars.

Troy Ribeiro of Free Press Journal said that "Despite its ambitious plot and potential for a gripping mystery, the film ultimately delivers a pedestrian experience. The investigation splits into two conflicting approaches—Sashi's pursuit of the financial trail versus Rajveer's focus on the murder—lacks the punch and ingenuity needed to sustain a thriller. Instead, it feels formulaic, uninspired, and forced- especially in the final twist.Overall, fans of murder mysteries may find themselves disappointed by this missed opportunity."

== Release ==
The film was officially released on 31 May 2024.
