= Singam II =

2013 Indian film by Hari

- Theatrical release poster
- Directed by: Hari
- Written by: Hari
- Produced by: S. Lakshman Kumar
- Starring: Suriya; Anushka Shetty; Hansika Motwani; Danny Sapani
- Cinematography: Priyan
- Edited by: V. T. Vijayan
- Music by: Devi Sri Prasad
- Production company: Prince Pictures
- Distributed by: 2D Entertainment
- Release date: 5 July 2013
- Running time: 165 minutes
- Country: India
- Language: Tamil
- Budget: ₹45 crore
- Box office: ₹136 crore

Singam II is a 2013 Indian Tamil-language action thriller film written and directed by Hari. Produced by Prince Pictures, and distributed by 2D Entertainment, it is a sequel to Singam (2010) and the second installment in the Singam trilogy. The film stars Suriya in the main lead role, alongside Anushka Shetty, Hansika Motwani, Danny Sapani, Mukesh Rishi, Rahman, Vivek and Santhanam. The music was composed by Devi Sri Prasad, while cinematography and editing were handled by Priyan and V. T. Vijayan.

Singam II was released on 5 July 2013 and became a commercial success. A sequel titled Si3 was released on 9 February 2017.

== Plot ==
Eight months after killing the extortionist Mayil Vaaganam, (Note: As depicted in Singam.) Durai Singam as resigned ACP goes on an undercover mission working as an NCC master in a school at Thoothukudi and studies the illegal activities happening in the city. The only people who know about the operation are the Chief Minister Kumaravel and Home Minister Ramanathan. Sathya is a 12th-grade student who falls in love with Singam, though Singam is waiting to marry Kavya. Soundarapandi who was enraged by his leaving the police force and forbids the marriage between Singam and Kavya, fearing Mahalingam(kavya's father) might take Singam away to manage his business empire leads Singam to lose respect among his relatives.

Susai, a local who works as a peon at Singam's school, shows the parts of Thoothukudi and tells about the rogue happenings in those places to Singam. Singam requests Ramanathan to transfer his collegues Erimalai and Damodaran who were promoted as SI to assist him. Singam later learns that Sathya is the niece of Thoothukudi-based weathy influential Businessman called Thangaraj who involved in financial and seaway scams along with Central Minister.Thangaraj is in long time alliance with Bhai a notorious Drug lord and illegal salt smuggler who controls the southeast coastline of Tamil Nadu. Bhai and Thangaraj have connections with Danny who was also known as Michael Kong Edwin, a powerful Drug lord and wanted international criminal. Singam does not know about their connection and keeps Bhai under his off-duty surveillance after learning about Bhai's involvement in Illegal Drug Trafficking. Bhai's ally Saghayam, a Drug importer kidnaps a girl from another caste after her brother insults him during a verbal fight in a bar, which causes riots between both communities in the city, Singam takes charge as the new DSP with Ramanathan's help, saves the girl and arrests Saghayam, where he was praised by people and also forgiven by his father. Sathya learns that Singam and Kavya are strongly in love and distances herself from them. Singam finds out about Thangaraj and Bhai's alliance also Thangaraj's involvement in drug trafficking, he decides to indirectly arrest Saghayam who earlier bailed by Bhai at his harbour in order to know about drug trade, also brought Danny with him to attend Thangaraj's new hotel party. Saghayam is arrested again, along with Danny and his men for Illegal Entry. Thangaraj uses his political influence to make Singam release the duo, but to no avail. Bhai sends an army of his goons to bust Danny and Saghayam out of prison during Thangaraj's diversion on Singam with help of district SP. Singam finds Danny's truth and rushes to Station, but his efforts are spoiled and he was suspended for unruly behaviour. Singam confronts Bhai and warned him that he learned about Danny and will return soon by bringing him to Justice. Singam meets Ramanathan at Chennai and proposes plans for an operation to arrest Danny and his associates, also all drug dealers in Thoothukudi for eleminating drug trafficking in South India. Singam is re-appointed and gets his superior suspended for helping Thangaraj. He gets authorisation to arrest and encountering drug dealers to death on sight without evidence.

Since the next load of drugs is ready to be delivered by Danny, Bhai orders Saghayam to deliver the drugs to him through his friend Nair in Kerala and will bring it back to Thoothukudi, Singam arrests him during long chase, also orders his subordinates to encounter Saghayam to death. Soundarapandi approves Singam and Kavya's marriage, during their engagement function, "Harbour" Shanmugam, Mayil's former ally informs Singam that Thangaraj has hired goons to attack his family that night. Singam fights the goons himself, where he places a drug bag inside Thangaraj's house and imprisons him. The next day, Singam learns that Sathya is dead after consuming poison, despite previously being told by Singam about her uncle's illegal activities. He realises that, Thangaraj had killed her with help of his elder brother who was Sathya's father as she knew the truth and to save Danny. Enraged, Singam confronts Thangaraj and pledges to impose death sentence on him for killing his niece, while Thangaraj using his influence to prevent operation, Singam seeks accessories from Ramanathan to travel Durban in South Africa to find Danny, as his marriage with Kavya will take place in three days.

Singam arrives at Durban and joins Police Major Kyle Ambrose from Durban Police to confront Danny, who has taken sanctuary with a Durban-based local don Alex. Singam and the Durban police chase them, where he defeats Alex's men, and during the chase Alex gets killed. After a long fight, Singam defeats Danny and his men at their ship and arrests him. Singam drags Danny to Thoothukudi and puts him back in the same cell from which he escaped and makes him realise the power of Indian Police. Along with Danny, Singam brings Bhai and Thangaraj to justice and avenging Sathya's death, latter he reunites with Kavya before their marriage.

== Cast ==
- Suriya as Durai Singam
- Anushka Shetty as Kavya
- Hansika Motwani as Sathya
- Danny Sapani as Danny (Michael Kong), an international drug cartel leader
- Mukesh Rishi as Bhai
- Rahman as Thangaraj
- Vivek as Sub-Inspector Erimalai, Singam's associate
- Santhanam as Susai
- Sumithra as Kalyani, Singam's mother
- Radha Ravi as Soundara Pandi, Singam's father
- Rajendran as Saghayam, Bhai's henchman
- Yuvarani as Dhanalakshmi, Singam's sister
- Crane Manohar as Palani, Kavya's brother
- Priya Atlee as Divya Mahalingam, Kavya’s sister
- Janaki Sabesh as Bharathi, Kavya's mother
- Nassar as Mahalingam, Kavya's father
- Manorama as Pattamma, Kavya's grandmother
- Delhi Kumar as Ganesan, Kavya's grandfather
- Vijayakumar as Home Minister Ramanathan
- Isaac Varghese as Thangaraj's PA
- Mansoor Ali Khan as Sub-Inspector Karim Bhai
- Sriranjani as Sathya's mother
- Thalaivasal Vijay as Sathya's father and Thangaraj's elder brother
- Kitty as Central Minister
- Madhan Bob as School Principal
- Swaminathan as Peon
- Thyagu as Harbour Shanmugam
- Citizen Mani as Mani
- Scissor Manohar as Anthony, Saghayam's henchman
- Robo Chandru as Police Inspector
- Lakshmi Vasudevan as Thangaraj's wife
- L. Raja as Thoothukudi SP
- Thyagu as Harbour Shanmugam
- Nizhalgal Ravi as ACP Rajendran IPS (cameo appearance)
- K. Vishwanath as Chief Minister (cameo appearance)
- Prakash Raj as Mayil Vaaganam (uncredited, archive footage from Singam)
- Anjali in an item number (cameo appearance in the song "Vaale Vaale")
- Robert (cameo appearance in the song "Singam Dance")

== Production ==
Hari said he initially did not plan a sequel to Singam once he completed that film, but always had the interest to do a sequel to a police film since Saamy (2013). Reprising their roles from the original film are Anushka Shetty, Vivek, Vijayakumar, Nassar, and Radha Ravi, while Hansika Motwani was signed on in a supporting role. British actor Danny Sapani plays the main antagonist and dubbed in his own voice. The actress Anjali is also featured in an item number.

Principal photography began in September 2012, and wrapped on 30 April 2013. The film was shot mainly in Thiruvananthapuram in Kerala, Tuticorin, Chennai, Tirunelveli and Karaikudi in Tamil Nadu, while some songs, stunts and talkie portions were filmed in Durban, Cape Town and Johannesburg in South Africa, as well as Malaysia and Kenya.

== Soundtrack ==
Singam II

Soundtrack album by Devi Sri Prasad
- Released: 2 June 2013
- Genre: Feature film soundtrack
- Language: Tamil
- Label: Gemini Audio
- Producer: Devi Sri Prasad

Devi Sri Prasad chronology
Iddarammayilatho (2013)	Singam II (2013)	Attarintiki Daredi (2013)

=== Development ===
Devi Sri Prasad, who had also worked on the score of Singam, returned for Singam II. Bollywood singer Baba Sehgal had recorded a song in the film following the success of his "Kadhal Vandhale" number from the original. The soundtrack was released on 2 June 2013, a day after its originally scheduled launch.

All lyrics are written by Viveka.

Track-List - Tamil
No.	Title	Singer(s)	Length
1.	"Puriyavillai"	Shweta Mohan	4:28
2.	"Vaale Vaale"	Shankar Mahadevan, Nakash Aziz	4:32
3.	"Achchamillai"	Devi Sri Prasad, Benny Dayal	3:11
4.	"Singam Dance"	Devi Sri Prasad, Baba Sehgal, Sharmila, Geetha Madhuri	4:19
5.	"Vidhai Pola"	Hariharan	4:48
6.	"Kannukkulle"	Javed Ali, Priya Himesh, Kunal Ganjawala	4:19
Total length:			25:37

=== Reception ===
Times of India gave the album 3/5 stars and stated that "DSP gets a foot-tapping album in Singam 2, though it sounds uncomfortably very similar to Singam."

Track listing - Telugu (Yamudu 2)
No.	Title	Lyrics	Singer(s)	Length
1.	"Teliyadule"	Ananth Sriram	Swetha Mohan	4:28
2.	"Waale Waale"	Sahithi	Tippu	4:32
3.	"Simham Simham"	Sahithi	Devi Sri Prasad	4:48
4.	"Singam Dance"	Ananth Sriram	Suchith Suresan, Sharmila	3:11
5.	"Sooridu Sooridu"	Sahithi	M. L. R. Karthikeyan	4:20
6.	"Nee Kanne Gunnai"	Ramajogayya Sastry	Sagar, Priya, David Simon	4:20
Total length:				25:37

== Release ==
Singam II was released worldwide on 5 July 2013. It was released in about 1500 screens worldwide, one of the largest releases for a Tamil film. The film released in a record 151 screens in Kerala.

== Reception ==
=== Critical response ===
S. Saraswathi of Rediff gave 3/5 stars and wrote "The Hari-Suriya combination seemed to have worked its magic once again. The screen presence and charisma of Suriya coupled with brilliance of Hari’s screenplay and direction makes Singam 2 a joyful experience." Deccan Chronicle wrote "Even if you are not a Suriya fan, Singam 2 is worth a watch. The film roars rather well." Zee News wrote "‘Singam 2’ is definitely bigger, but it never gets better in the process of entertaining its viewers. It has a storyline that could keep you hooked but what doesn't work in the favour of the film is the presence of too many characters and a weak screenplay." The Times of India gave 3.5/5 stars and wrote "If Singam was mass masala, then Singam-2 is doubly so. Hari is clear about what entertainment he wants to dole out to his audiences and goes about delivering it unapologetically." Baradwaj Rangan of The Hindu wrote "Hari keeps his scenes extremely short, and if this prevents us from forming any sort of lingering attachment with the characters, at least we aren't allowed to dwell on anything long enough to get bored." News18 gave 2/5 stars and wrote "'Singam 2' is definitely bigger, but it never gets better in the process of entertaining its viewers."

== Other versions ==
The Telugu dubbed version simply titled Singam, also known as Yamudu II, was also released along with the original version on 5 July 2013. The film's Telugu version was distributed by K. E. Gnanavel Raja's Studio Green. A Hindi dubbed version entitled Main Hoon Surya: Singham II was released later on 2 August.

== Box office ==
Singam II had a sold-out opening with as much as 95–100% occupancy. The film collected ₹9.25 crore (US$960,000) on its opening day in Tamil Nadu, Kerala and Karnataka, while the Telugu dubbed version Yamudu II collected ₹3.75 crore (US$390,000). The film grossed ₹50 crore (US$5.2 million) on its first weekend worldwide.

In the UK and USA, it earned ₹59.6 lakh (US$62,000) and ₹1.47 crore (US$150,000) respectively on its opening weekend. The film earned ₹13 crore (US$1.3 million) in Chennai after seven weeks. According to Sify.com, the film stayed inside the top five positions at Chennai box office continuously for eight weeks after its release and was declared a 'Superhit'. The film completed a 50 days theatrical run on 23 August 2013.

The film's Telugu version Yamudu II was an unusual success and earned ₹14 crore (US$1.5 million) in ten days from Andhra Pradesh. The film was successful in Karnataka and Kerala as well, collecting about ₹6.9 crore (US$720,000) and ₹4.6 crore (US$480,000) in its first ten days, respectively.

It performed exceptionally well in the Malaysian market, earning around ₹9.98 crore (US$1.0 million) within four weeks. The film was the third highest Tamil grosser in Malaysia after Enthiran and Sivaji at that point. The film's total business in UK after a one-month run was pegged at ₹1.79 crore (US$190,000). Singam II completed 100 days in several screens across Tamil Nadu, Kerala and Andhra Pradesh on 12 October 2013. The film was the second highest-grossing Tamil film of the year 2013 after Vishwaroopam.

The film grossed approximately ₹136 crore worldwide in its lifetime.

== Sequel ==
The third and final part of the Singam film series was initially scheduled to enter production in December 2015. Suriya and Anushka reprised their roles. Production on the film was, however, postponed due to climatic conditions in Chennai. Principal photography eventually began on 17 December with the filming of a song sequence, while regular shooting was scheduled to happen later in the month, though it was later moved to January 2016. Regular shooting commenced on 7 January 2016, with the film's title being revealed as S3. After a long gap, during which the release of the film was postponed several times, the title was changed from S3 to Si 3. This was in order to exploit the Tamil Nadu Government's rule of entertainment tax exemption for films titled in Tamil.
