= Singam =

2010 Indian film by Hari

- Theatrical release poster
- Directed by: Hari
- Written by: Hari
- Produced by: K. E. Gnanavel Raja
- Starring: Suriya; Anushka Shetty; Prakash Raj
- Cinematography: Priyan
- Edited by: V. T. Vijayan
- Music by: Devi Sri Prasad
- Production companies: Reliance BIG Pictures; Studio Green
- Distributed by: Sun Pictures
- Release date: 28 May 2010
- Running time: 159 minutes
- Country: India
- Language: Tamil
- Budget: ₹15 crore
- Box office: est. ₹90 crore

Singam (transl. Lion) is a 2010 Indian Tamil-language action thriller film written and directed by Hari. Produced by K. E. Gnanavel Raja's Studio Green and Reliance BIG Entertainment, and distributed by Sun Pictures, it is the first instalment in the Singam film series. The film stars Suriya in the lead role, alongside Anushka Shetty, Prakash Raj, and Vivek. It was Suriya's 25th film as the lead actor.

Singam was released on 28 May 2010 and grossed around ₹90 crore (equivalent to ₹220 crore or US$23 million in 2026) worldwide. It was remade in Kannada as Kempe Gowda, in Hindi as Singham, in Bengali as Shotru, and in Punjabi as Singham. The film was followed by two sequels titled Singam II (2013) and Si3 (2017).

== Plot ==
Sub-Inspector Duraisingam "Singam", an honest police officer, lives in Nallur, a small village in Thoothukudi district in southern Tamil Nadu, and is assisted by his bumbling colleague Erimalai. Singam belongs to Nallur with his father, Soundarapandi, having a respectable status in the village. His family runs a large provision stores in Tuticorin and though Singam wants to join that business, he had to join the police force due to Soundarapandi's wishes. In exchange for Durai Singam respecting his father's wish, Soundarapandi had gotten him posted in home village by requesting the Local MLA. Over three years, Durai Singam resolves most of the problems in his village with non-violence and mutual counselling as the Station House Officer of the Police Station. He uses force only when the situation demands it, thereby earning great respect and affection from the villagers.

Mahalingam, an industrialist in Chennai and a friend of Soundarapandi, arrives at the village with his daughters Kavya and Divya. Singam initially assumes Kavya is a prankster when she is about to prank her cousin by wearing a tiger costume. While roaming around the village, Singam accidentally slaps Kavya, but later apologises to her. Kavya gets moved by this and slowly falls in love with him. After some hilarious incidents, Kavya professes her love to Singam. Initially taken aback, Singam reciprocates Kavya's love.

Mayil Vaaganam, a Chennai-based thug infamous for extortion and kidnapping, who often earns money by blackmailing rich people about their black money to the income tax and by harassing upcoming corporates by threating to block their ongoing construction. One day, Mayil threatens an old NRI man with payment of extortion money, otherwise trapping him in a fake rape case. The old man commits suicide and for that, and him sending a Death-Confession by Email to authorities puts Mayil in a tough situation where is required to travel to Nallur to sign a conditional bail. Mayil instead sends one of his allies to do the formalities and that guy gets caught by Singam in the 10th day of the 15-day period, enraging Singam. Singam demands that Mayil sign the bail in person, failing which he will create no-show record and get him arrested. A humiliated Mayil reaches Nallur in a rush and threatens Singam, but is unable to take any revenge on Singam, fearing the immense love and devotion of the entire village towards Singam. Using his political contacts, Mayil gets Singam transferred to Chennai along with a promotion to teach him a lesson. Unaware of Mayil's hand behind his transfer, Singam joins the Thiruvanmiyur police station. His co-worker, SI Ravi, hates Mayil for his crimes, but is unable to take any action because of Mayil's political powers. Singam's senior Rajendran is on Mayil's payroll and takes care in concealing and eliminating evidence of Mayil's crimes.

The police commissioner does not help Singam because there is a lack of evidence against Mayil. Rajendran warns Singam to stay away from Mayil's case. Unable to take on Mayil in his stronghold, Singam wants to return to his village, but is stopped by Kavya, who encourages him to fight against Mayil and end his crime network. Being mentally tortured by Mayil, Singam decides to quit the job but is motivated by Kavya and as a result, Singam arrests Mayil's brother, Vaikuntam, in a fake case of illegally smuggling alcohol. He thwarts Rajendran in full view of the public when Rajendran, bound by his duties to Mayil, tries to protect the henchmen. Mayil kidnaps Divya for ransom from Mahalingam. Singam rescues her and arrested some hooligans of Mayil. Mahalingam, who was hostile to Singam following an altercation with Soundarapandi back at Nallur, softens up and agrees to give him Kavya's hand in marriage.

Singam successfully traces the origins of the kidnapping racket to Mayil and also gets promoted to ACP of the specially-formed Anti-Kidnapping Task Force by the Home Minister Ramanathan.

The entire police force, including the police commissioner and Rajendran, is now on Singam's side and helps him to fight Mayil.They manage to kill Mayil's henchmen in an encounter at a hospital and begin to target everyone and everything related to Mayil. In retribution, Mayil starts targeting everyone close to Singam, including Kavya, but is saved by Singam and Ravi, who is hacked to death by Mayil. To escape from getting arrested, Mayil kidnaps the daughter of the Karnataka Home Minister.

Mayil falsely tells Singam that he is going to Pondicherry with her, but he is going to Nellore in Andhra Pradesh to put the police off the track. However, Singam manages to pursue them till Gudur near Nellore, where he rescues her and kills Mayil in an encounter. Singam resigns from his job publicly in a felicitation function organised for him, where he heads back to Nallur with Kavya. Singam is stopped briefly by Ramanathan, who offers an undercover mission, to which he willingly agrees.

== Cast ==
- Suriya as Durai Singam
- Anushka Shetty as Kavya Mahalingam, Singam's love interest
- Prakash Raj as Mayil Vaaganam
- Vivek as Erimalai, Head Constable and Singam's colleague
- Adithya as Vaikuntam, Mayilvaganam's brother
- Vijayakumar as Home Minister Ramanathan
- Nizhalgal Ravi as Rajendran, Assistant Commissioner of Police
- Radha Ravi as Soundarapandi, Singam's father
- Nassar as Mahalingam, Kavya's father
- Sumithra as Kalyani Soundarapandi, Singam's mother
- Janaki Sabesh as Bharathi Mahalingam, Kavya's mother
- Priya Atlee as Divya Mahalingam, Kavya's younger sister
- Yuvarani as Dhanalakshmi, Singam's sister
- Manorama as Pattamma, Kavya's grandmother
- Delhi Kumar as Ganesan, Kavya's grandfather
- Ajay Ratnam as K.Sekar IPS, Commissioner of Chennai
- Bose Venkat as Sub-Inspector Ravi
- Manobala as Mayil's lawyer
- Kaajal Pasupathi as Police Officer
- Pandu as Maarichaamy
- Thyagu as Harbour Shanmugam
- Crane Manohar as Palani
- Besant Ravi as goon in theatre
- Bharathi Kannan
- Subash Chander as Vengai Swami
- Vanaja as Sumathi
- Cell Murugan as Mumbai Rowdy
- Soundhar
- Suryakanth
- Nandha Saravanan as Mayil Vaaganam's henchman
- Jayamani
- Jayakanthan
- Karnaa Radha
- Vengaiya Balan
- Sakthivel
- Bobby
- Minor Yogi
- Rathan Mouli as Jaishankar
- Vishwanth as Lover
- Kadhal Saravanan as Farmer
- Pei Krishnan

== Production ==
Singam, the 25th film for Suriya as lead actor, was announced in April 2009. It is his third collaboration with director Hari after Aaru (2005) and Vel (2007), as well as Suriya's second film as a police officer after Kaakha Kaakha (2003) and the second police film directed by Hari after Saamy (2003). Suriya revealed that he and Hari initially did not want to do another police film as they felt the previous two were "still fresh in the minds of the audience" but decided to proceed after Suriya liked the pitch provided by Hari. The actor sported a handlebar moustache for his role. The film was shot in locations including Valasaravakkam in Chennai and parts of Andhra Pradesh, while the song "En Idhayam" was shot at Qantab Beach in Muscat and Nizwa. Within Tamil Nadu, the film was also shot in Courtallam, Karaikudi, Tenkasi and Tirunelveli.

== Soundtrack ==
The soundtrack was composed by Devi Sri Prasad, marking his third collaboration with Suriya after Maayavi (2005) and Aaru and with Hari for the second time after Aaru. The audio rights were bought by Sony Music South.

Singam
| No. | Title | Lyrics | Singer(s) | Length |
|---|---|---|---|---|
| 1. | "Naane Indhiran" | Viveka | Benny Dayal, Manicka Vinayagam | 5:33 |
| 2. | "En Idhayam" | Na. Muthukumar | Suchitra & Tippu | 4:34 |
| 3. | "Stole My Heart" (Unplugged) | Hari | Shaan | 2:19 |
| 4. | "Stole My Heart" | Viveka | Shaan, Megha | 3:37 |
| 5. | "Singam" | Na. Muthukumar, Megha | Devi Sri Prasad | 4:21 |
| 6. | "Kadhal Vandhale" | Viveka | Baba Sehgal, Priyadarshini | 4:22 |

All lyrics are written by Sahithi.

Yamudu
| No. | Title | Singer(s) | Length |
|---|---|---|---|
| 1. | "Nene Indrudai" | Benny Dayal & Manicka Vinayagam | 5:33 |
| 2. | "Naa Hrudayam" | Suchitra & Tippu | 4:34 |
| 3. | "Stole My Heart (Unplugged)" | Shaan | 2:19 |
| 4. | "Stole My Heart" | Shaan, Megha | 3:37 |
| 5. | "Simham" | Devi Sri Prasad | 4:21 |
| 6. | "Oole Oolele" | Baba Sehgal & Priyadarshini | 4:22 |

== Release ==
Singam was released on 28 May 2010 in theatres worldwide. It was distributed by Sun Pictures.

== Reception ==
=== Critical reception ===
Sify gave 3/5 stars and wrote "Singam is a predictable entertainer that follows the age old formula, which might appeal to viewers who finds comfort in mass masala entertainers." Pavithra Srinivasan of Rediff.com gave 2.5/5 stars and wrote "Singam is an unapologetic entertainer and has Suriya in every frame. Lovers of commercial potpourri will definitely get their money's worth." Bhama Devi Ravi of The Times of India gave 3.5/5 stars and wrote "Even with a sleepy narration in the first 30 minutes or so, Singam is worth a watch."

=== Box office ===
In Malaysia and the United Kingdom, Singam collected $1,471,508 and $12,956 respectively. According to The Times of India, it grossed around ₹90 crore (equivalent to ₹220 crore or US$23 million in 2026) worldwide and was the second highest-grossing Tamil film of the year behind Enthiran.

== Awards ==
At the 58th Filmfare Awards South, Suriya was nominated for Best Actor – Tamil.

== Remakes and dubbed versions ==
Singam was remade in multiple different languages; in Hindi as Singham (2011), in Kannada as Kempe Gowda (2011), in Bengali as Shotru, and in Punjabi as Singham (2019). It was dubbed in Telugu under the title Yamudu, and was released on 2 July 2010.

== Sequels ==
The film's success led to two sequels: Singam II (2013) and Si3 (2017), both also directed by Hari and starring Suriya in the title role.

== In other media ==
Vivek, Santhanam and Soori parodied Suriya's character in the Malayalam film Oru Nunakkadha (2011), Vellore Maavattam (2011), and Varuthapadatha Valibar Sangam (2013), respectively. The famous line in the film, "Ongi Adicha Ondra Tonne Weight da!" (My hit is of one and half tonnes in force!) was used in "The Punch Song", a song from the film, Aaha Kalyanam (2014), which compiles popular phrases from earlier Tamil films. The character Durai Singam made a cameo in the climax of Karuppu (2026).
