= Controll =

2025 Indian film

- Promotional poster
- Directed by: Safdar Abbas
- Written by: P. S. Mithran
- Produced by: Dhaval Gada; Abhay Sinha
- Starring: Thakur Anoop Singh; Priya Anand; Rohit Roy; Rajesh Sharma; Denzil Smith
- Cinematography: Arun Prasad
- Edited by: Bunty Nagi
- Music by: Bharat-Hitarth
- Production companies: Pen Studios; Yashi Studios
- Distributed by: Pen Studios
- Release date: 10 October 2025
- Country: India
- Language: Hindi

Controll is a 2025 Indian Hindi-language crime thriller film directed by Safdar Abbas and produced by Pen Studios and Yashi Studios. It stars an ensemble cast of Thakur Anoop Singh, Priya Anand, Rohit Roy alongside Rajesh Sharma and Denzil Smith in supporting roles. The film was theatrically released on 10 October 2025. It is the official remake of the 2018 blockbuster Irumbu Thirai, starring Vishal, Arjun, and Samantha in the lead roles.

== Plot ==
Abhimanyu, a brilliant IMA cadet's seemingly perfect life is shattered when his friend cum brother-in-law commits suicide. Abhimanyu wants to find out who or what drove Dev to suicide, but the more he tries to find out, the more he gets trapped in the intricate web. He learns that Dev was scammed by an organised network. He vows to unmask the organisation that had trapped and scammed Dev. How Abhimanyu and his IMA friends dismantle the scammer's network and bring justice to thousands of people forms the rest of this stylish, action-packed, thrilling adventure.

== Cast ==
- Thakur Anoop Singh as Major Abhimanyu Shastri
- Rohit Roy as Spydro / Shekhar Sisodiya
- Priya Anand as Kashish
- Rajesh Sharma as Mr. Shastri
- Denzil Smith as Colonel Khan

== Marketing ==
The official trailer for Controll was released on the YouTube channel of Pen Studios in September 2025.

== Release ==
Controll was released theatrically across India on 10 October 2025.

== Reception ==
Ganesh Aaglave of Firstpost rated it 3/5 stars and said that "In conclusion, Controll is a well-meaning film with a socially relevant message, but it doesn’t always rise to the potential of its premise. It’s a decent watch — especially for viewers interested in tech-driven narratives — but it stops just short of being truly gripping." Simran Singh of DNA rated it 3/5 stars and stated that "The basic premise of Controll isn't novel, but it's still relevant. Also, the performances of Rohit Roy and Thakur Anoop Singh make this crime thriller an engaging watch."
