= Romeo S3 =

Indian Hindi-language action thriller film

- Theatrical release poster
- Directed by: Guddu Dhanoa
- Written by: Shailesh Verma
- Based on: Si3 by Hari
- Produced by: Jayantilal Gada
- Starring: Thakur Anoop Singh; Palak Tiwari
- Cinematography: Raju Kaygee
- Edited by: Rahul Gupta
- Music by: Songs: Harshit Saxena; Dilip Sen–Sameer Sen; Score: Harris Jayaraj (unc.)
- Production companies: Pen Studios; Wild River Pictures
- Release date: 15 May 2025
- Running time: 147 minutes
- Country: India
- Language: Hindi

Romeo S3 is a 2025 Indian Hindi-language action thriller film directed by Guddu Dhanoa and produced by Jayantilal Gada. A partial remake of the 2017 Tamil-language film Si3 (2017), where Thakur Anoop Singh played the antagonist, here he plays the protagonist. The film also stars Palak Tiwari.

== Cast ==
- Thakur Anoop Singh as DCP Sangram Singh Shekhawat
- Palak Tiwari as Tanu
- Shivani Jadhav as Anushka
- Aman Dhaliwal as Jayant Makhija
- Sachin Khedekar as Praful Mankhija
- Rajesh Khattar as D'Mello
- Anant Jog as Leeladhar Sawant
- Zakir Hussain as Zakir
- Shaji Choudhary as Yusuf
- Susheel Parashar as Prime Minister
- Dinesh Kaushik as Home Minister
- Smita Jaykar as Goa CM
- Subhash Sehgal as Sabharwal (Home Secretary)
- Javed Haider as Gustaad
- Ganesh Yadav as Vijay Kalshekar
- Gireesh Sahdev as Bala
- Ashish Warang as Francis
- Amit Bahl as Shiv Chaudary
- Jeniffer Christine Piccinato as Monica, Makhija's Personal Secretary

== Production ==
The film began production in early 2021. The film's title was announced in mid-2022. The film was shot in 43 days.

== Soundtrack ==
The songs were composed by Harshit Saxena and the duo Dilip Sen–Sameer Sen.

All lyrics are written by Sameer. (Note: The lyricist for "Sangram" is uncredited.)

Track listing
No.	Title	Music	Singer(s)	Length
1.	"Pyar Hai Pyar Hai"	Dilip Sen–Sameer Sen	Hashmat Sultana	4:00
2.	"Dhoka Dhoka"	Harshit Saxena	Bhoomi Trivedi	3:54
3.	"Elaan - E - Ishq"	Harshit Saxena	Palak Muchchal	4:23
4.	"Sangram" (based on "S3 Vettai Theme" from Si3)	Harris Jayaraj (unc.)	—	—
Total length:				12:00

== Reception ==
Dhaval Roy of The Times of India rated the film 2 stars out of 5 and wrote, "While a few action sequences manage to grab your attention, they aren't enough to salvage the overall experience. Romeo S3 tries to deliver a massy action thriller but ends up as an over-the-top masala fare with little payoff". Sushmita Dey of Times Now gave the film the same rating and wrote, "In a nutshell, Romeo S3 is a beginner's entry in the action-thriller genre despite all its flaws. While it doesn’t break new ground, it delivers what it promises: a gripping ride full of grit, guns, and a crusade for justice".
