= Mahabharat (2013 film) =

2013 Indian animated film by Amaan Khan

- Theatrical release poster
- Directed by: Amaan Khan
- Produced by: Kushal Kantilal Gada; Dhaval Gada
- Starring: Amitabh Bachchan; Sunny Deol; Anil Kapoor; Ajay Devgn; Vidya Balan; Shatrughan Sinha; Manoj Bajpayee; Jackie Shroff; Anupam Kher; Deepti Naval; Vrajesh Hirjee
- Cinematography: Satyajit Pande (Setu)
- Music by: Rajendra Shiv
- Production company: Pen Studios
- Distributed by: Pen Studios
- Release date: 27 December 2013
- Running time: 125 minutes
- Country: India
- Language: Hindi
- Budget: ₹50 crore (US$5.2 million)
- Box office: est. ₹1.5 crore (US$160,000)

Mahabharat is a 2013 Indian Hindi-language animated film, directed by Amaan Khan and based on the Hindu epic Mahabharata by Veda Vyasa. The film is produced by Kushal Kantilal Gada and Dhaval Jayantilal Gada. The film was a Christmas release on 27 December 2013. Several actors like Amitabh Bachchan, Sunny Deol, Anil Kapoor, Ajay Devgn, Vidya Balan, Shatrughan Sinha, Manoj Bajpayee, Jackie Shroff, Anupam Kher, Deepti Naval, and Vrajesh Hirjee were signed up for the characters in the film. It is touted as the most expensive animated film in Bollywood.

== Plot ==
Two brothers come across a magic coin and fight for it. A bird appears from the coin and begins reciting the Mahabharata as a message for all of mankind.

She sings the summary of the war's origins. Sage Durvasa visits Princess Kunti's palace and blesses her that she will obtain sons from the gods. Kunti asks for a son from the sun god but becomes ridiculed for being an unwed mother, so she leaves him in a basket to float away in River Ganga. She marries Pāndu and has 3 sons: Yudhiṣṭhira, Bhīma and Arjuna. Pandu's second wife, Madri, gives birth to Nakula and Sahadeva. Pandu's sons are known as the Pandavas. Pandu's blind brother, Dhṛtarāṣṭra, has 100 sons, the Kauravas, with his wife Gāndhari. The eldest Kaurava is Duryodhana. The Pandavas and Kauravas learn under Sage Dronācharya and develop animosity between one another, which sparks the Mahabharata.

In Hastinapur, grandsire Bhīṣma arrives at the exhibition of the Pāndavas' and Kauravas' weapon skills. Karṇa, Kunti's first son that she gave away, arrives to challenge Arjuna as the best archer. He is originally not allowed to participate in the challenge because he is not royalty, but Duryodhana declares him the King of Aṅga, eager to see Karṇa defeat Arjuna. Seeing them duel each other, Dronacharya declares Karṇa and Arjuna as equally skillful warriors. Yudhiṣthira is declared the King of Hastināpura, which makes Duryodhana jealous. His uncle, Shakuni, helps him devise a plan that will burn the Pāndavas to ashes. They plan to burn their palace, but Vidura, another uncle, tells Bhīma of the plan beforehand. Everyone believes that the Pāndavas and Kunti have been burned alive, but with the help of Vidura, they use an underground escape route to flee the burning palace. Vidura advises them to live undercover in the forest for some time to build their strength and supporters, telling them that Krishna will guide them.

King Drupada holds a competition to find a husband for his daughter, Draupadī. The Pandavas arrive in the disguise of Brahmaṇas to partake, and Arjuna wins the competition. When Arjuna comes to tell Kunti the news, without hearing what happened, Kunti orders Arjuna to share whatever he has won amongst all five brothers. Krishna arrives and explains how in her past life, Draupadī had asked for a husband five times, and Shiva had granted this request.

The Pāndavas create a palace of illusions and invite Duryodhana, where Draupadī insults him out of vengeance. Duryodhana leaves feeling humiliated and angry. Duryodhana sets up a gambling match, where Yudhiṣṭhira loses his kingdom and all of his possessions. He gambles away Draupadī, who Duṣṣāsana publicly disrobes. Draupadī prays to Krishna, who uses his divine power to protect her dignity. To atone for their sins of gambling and not protecting Draupadī, the Pāndavas go into exile again.

Krishna warns the Kauravas against starting war, but they do not pay heed. Arjuna tells Krishna he cannot fight against his family, but Krishna tells him this is a war of right and wrong, and he must fight for the truth. Krishna reminds him that souls are immortal, so he should not worry about killing his family members' bodies. The Pāndavas realize that they can't win until Bhīṣma is on the battlefield because he has a boon that he cannot die. Arjuna reluctantly shoots him with many arrows to incapacitate him. The Pāndavas send Arjuna's son Abhimanyu to the battlefield to break Dronācharya's labyrinth. Duryodhana and Shakuni trap Abhimanyu in the labyrinth formation and stab him from the back.

Kunti visits Karṇa and tells her that she is his mother, begging him to spare the Pāndavas. He promises not to kill any of the Pāndava brothers except for Arjuna. On the battlefield, Duryodhana gets angry with Karan for not shooting the Pāndavas when they are easy targets. Instead, while Karṇa is fixing his stuck wheel, Krishna tells Arjuna to shoot him, and Karṇa sacrifices himself for the sake of his mother. Seeing his army being defeated, Duryodhan sits in the ocean to meditate and Bhīma follows him. They engage in a duel until Bhīma hits him in the thigh and kills him, ending the war. Kunti reveals to everyone that Karṇa was her eldest son and that he sacrificed himself for her to remove the stigma against him. Yudhiṣṭhira is crowned king and the Pāndavas rule Hastināpura.

The storytelling bird tells the boys that they should never forget the lessons from the Mahabhārata, such as respecting elders and living in unity.

== Voice cast ==
- Amitabh Bachchan as Bhishma
- Sunny Deol as Bheema
- Anil Kapoor as Karna
- Ajay Devgn as Arjuna
- Vidya Balan as Draupadi
- Shatrughan Sinha as Krishna
- Manoj Bajpayee as Yudhishthira
- Jackie Shroff as Duryodhana
- Anupam Kher as Shakuni
- Deepti Naval as Kunti
- Vrajesh Hirjee as Dushasana
- Rohini Hattangadi as the old bird
- Ajay Chaddha as Dhritarashtra
- Meena Ramraj Nahta as Gāndhari
- Dharmesh Tiwari as Dronacharya
- Shiva Banerjee as Abhimanyu

== Production ==
=== Filming ===
Amitabh Bachchan lent his baritone voice and sombre expressions to Bheeshma Pitamah, which coincidentally is the first time he dubbed for an animated character in his 51-year+ film career since 1969. Sunny Deol lent his voice and mannerism for Bheem. Anil Kapoor dubbed for Karna while he was given an option to dub for any one of the characters of Karna and Arjuna. He took 15 days to complete his work while Manoj Bajpayee finished the dubbing for his character in just four days in Future Works Studio in Andheri, Mumbai. The trailer of the film was unveiled on 16 November 2013. Besides the launch of the trailer there were three audiovisuals that introduced the animated characters of Balan, Kapoor and Devgn. Jackie Shroff lent his voice for Duryodhan. Lord Krishna's voice is dubbed by Shatrughan Sinha. None of the A-listers charged any remuneration for lending their voices to the characters in the film. Film producers gave Shatrughan Sinha an option to choose any of the roles to lend his voice to. Sinha selected the role of Krishna. Mahabharat has an insurance cover of ₹50 crore, thus becoming the highest insured Bollywood production film, beating My Name Is Khan (2010), which was insured for ₹46 crore.

== Soundtrack ==
1. "Dharamkshetra" – Kailash Kher
2. "Kaal Kyon" – Zubin Garg
3. "Koi Na Jaane" – Shankar Mahadevan, Rajendra Shiv,
4. Naar Naveli" – Alka Yagnik, Raja Hassan
5. "Suno Sunao" – Sadhana Sargam, Anupam Amod, Vijayaa Shanker

== Critical reception ==
The film received mixed reviews. Subhash K. Jha said, "If you were hoping that animation films would come of age with this purported epic, you are in for a disappointment. Though the characters from the Mahabharat have faces and voices of the biggest stars, the images do not add up to a compelling canvas. Not by a wide margin." India TV said, "The presentation is epic in intent, yes. Alas, the execution, packaging and projection leave the epic undernourished and over-emphasized." and rated it 2 out of 5 stars.

Meena Iyer of The Times of India rated it three and half out of five, saying "Amitabh Bachchan's bartitone is used for the stellar Bheeshma Pitamah. Although the Big B doesn't have muscular arms like his animated counterpart, their faces match. A superlative list of actors like Sunny Deol (Bhīma), Ajay Devgn (Arjuna), Anil Kapoor (Karṇa), Jackie Shroff (Duryodhana), Manoj Bajpayee (Yudhiṣṭhira), Anupam Kher (Shakuni) and Vidya Balan (Draupadī) have also infused life into the computer generated characters with their inimitable voices." and concluded, "On the flip side, the animation effort itself is immature and several notches below those of Hollywood films. Yet the dub effort by the Bollywood superstars uplifts this epic, making it enjoyable."

Deepanjana Pal of Firstpost said, "The artwork in Mahabharat is appalling and the animation is worse. From the movements of the characters to the visual effects – like two arrows going at each other – it looks like a pirated and outdated version of MS Paint was used to create the film." and added, "The movements of the characters are awkward and jerky, making it look like the mythical heroes learned how to walk from Godzilla. The battle scenes are not only badly drawn and animated, they're also boring." and concluded, "This new Mahabharata isn't so much a kid-friendly version as one made for dummies, by dummies."

Taran Adarsh of Bollywood Hungama rated the film 3 out of 5 stars, saying "The USP of Mahabharat is that the characters in the film bear a strong resemblance to the actors lending them their voices. The film should work for two more reasons: the riveting story and the superior quality animation [a handful of scenes notwithstanding]. Besides, minute detailing has gone into the costumes, effects and the overall look." and concluded, "The one flaw that stands out is the lip sync of the characters with the voiceovers, which seems to go out of place in a few sequences.".

== Box office ==
Mahabharat grossed Rs 1.5 crore from 185 screens in domestic circuit in the first weekend.

== See also ==
- List of Bollywood films of 2013
- Kochadaiiyaan
- Delhi Safari
