= Yeh Mera India =

- YMI Theatrical Poster
- Directed by: N. Chandra
- Produced by: N. Chandra; Dhaval Gada
- Starring: Anupam Kher; Perizaad Zorabian; Purab Kohli; Rajpal Yadav; Sarika; Seema Biswas
- Cinematography: Matthew Boyd
- Edited by: N. Chandra
- Music by: Adnan Sami; Kavita Seth; Ranjit Barot (background score)
- Distributed by: N Chandra Global Infotainment Ltd; Pen India Pvt. Ltd.
- Release dates: 13 August 2008 (Filmi South Asian Film Festival); 28 August 2009 (Indian)
- Running time: 134 minutes
- Country: India
- Language: Hindi

Yeh Mera India (also known as Y.M.I. Yeh Mera India) is a 2009 Indian Hindi-language drama film written and directed by N. Chandra. The film stars Anupam Kher, Perizaad Zorabian, Sayaji Shinde Purab Kohli, Rajpal Yadav, Sarika, and Seema Biswas.

== Synopsis ==
Yeh Mera India focuses on the comprehensive lifestyle of Mumbai, with a special focus on the biases that permeate the corner of its society. Whether it is communal, social, economic, religious, or educational biases, the "bias" factor dominates the entire depiction of the film, merging different characters into one story.

The different biases that are incorporated into the film are as follows:

1. Religious bias: A devout Muslim listens to the radical sermons of a religious leader that aim to instigate his followers to take revenge for the wrongdoings occurring within the Islamic community. This leads his followers to collaborate to create havoc in the city, but plans fail. However, when the plan is about to succeed, the follower decides to abort it, seeing a Hindu boy walk towards it. This child had previously helped a lost Muslim girl find her mother.
2. Communal bias: Rajpal Yadav is a Bihari who has just arrived in Mumbai looking for work. In his quest for some money and food, Yadav encounters incredible bias against his community, with Marathis blaming his creed for taking away jobs and others ridiculing his sub-par technical skills. On the other side, Shrivallabh Vyas, a Brahmin politician, opposes his son's courtship of Smilie Suri, a Dalit girl; however, he decides to exploit the relationship for political gain.
3. Social bias: Sarika is the administrator of a large hospital, running it with zeal and fervour. Seema Biswas is a poor woman who is trying to gather funds for her husband's bail money, as he has been framed in a fraudulent case. Biswas works at Sarika's house, cooking meals and cleaning the house. Despite Seema's honest work, Sarika continues to doubt her when things go missing, checking her purse and doubting her character. In the end, it is Biswas who comes to the aid of Sarika at a crucial moment.
4. Gender bias: Sarika's husband is a successful builder and owner of several call centres across Mumbai. Intoxicated with money and power, he finds himself unable to resist deflowering women, using every moment to lure women by showering expensive gifts on them. However, a moment arrives where he finds himself at a crossroads, unable to face reality but understanding its repercussions.
5. Economic bias: Perizaad Zorabian is the successful creative head of a channel. However, work and life have tensed her. She is unable to bear the hectic pressure of Mumbai and asks her husband to find work in either the United States or the United Kingdom. Perizaad looks for opportunities to insult people and finds her financial power too strong to succumb to emotion.

== Cast ==
- Anupam Kher as Judge Ayyar
- Atul Kulkarni as Raja Shetty
- Milind Gunaji as Ashfaq
- Aakash Pandey as TV Director
- Parvin Dabas as Sameer Ali
- Perizaad Zorabian
- Rajit Kapur as Arun Talreja
- Purab Kohli as Nachiket S. Joshi
- Rajpal Yadav as Bhola Paswan
- Sarika as Sushma A. Talreja
- Sayaji Shinde as Inspector Chandrakant Shinde
- Seema Biswas as Sharda Bai
- Smilie Suri as Asha Atmaram Ambedkar
- Vijay Raaz as Noor Ahmed Khan
- Veerendra Saxena as Dr. Mandadhi
- Shrivallabh Vyas as Shripad Joshi
- Ashwin Mushran as Amarjit Singh
- Siddhant Karnick as Jatin Gunguly
- Bharat Ganeshpure as Altaf Chowgule
- Rajesh Jais as Kaul's son-in-law
- Neelu Kohli as Jatin's mother

== Reception ==
Yeh Mera India received mixed reviews from critics. Rajeev Masand said in his review that "the acting's embarrassingly weak and the scenarios all exaggerated", but Taran Adarsh wrote, "Here's a film that pricks your conscience and makes you think".

== Soundtrack ==
1. "Aap Roothe Rahe" (Kavita Seth)
2. "Bansuri" (Zubeen Garg)
3. "Dil Mandir" (Kavita Seth)
4. "More Naina" (Kavita Seth)
