= Thakur Anoop Singh =

Indian actor (born 1983)

- Born: Pune, Maharashtra, India
- Occupations: Actor; athlete; bodybuilder; playback singer
- Years active: 2011–present

Thakur Anoop Singh is an Indian actor and bodybuilder who primarily appears in Telugu films and some Marathi, Tamil and Kannada films. He played Dhritarashtra in the 2013 TV series Mahabharat. In 2015 he won a gold medal in a bodybuilding contest in Bangkok, Thailand.

== Personal life ==
His ancestral roots lie in Udaipur, Rajasthan, and he belongs to a Rajput family.

== Bodybuilding career ==
=== National and international titles ===
| Year | Wins | Event | Category |
|---|---|---|---|
| 2015 | Gold | 7th WBPF World Bodybuilding Championship - Thailand | Men's Fitness Physique |
| 2015 | Bronze | 49th Asian Championship - Uzbekistan | Men's Fitness Physique |
| 2015 | Silver | Fit Factor - Mr India 2015 | Men's Fitness Physique |

== Filmography ==
| Year | Film | Role | Language | Notes |
|---|---|---|---|---|
| 2017 | Si3 | Vittal Prasad | Tamil | |
| 2017 | Winner | Aadi | Telugu | |
| 2017 | Commando 2 | K.P | Hindi | |
| 2017 | Rogue | Psycho | Telugu; Kannada | |
| 2018 | Achari America Yatra | Vijay (Vicky) | Telugu | |
| 2018 | Naa Peru Surya | Challa's Son | Telugu | |
| 2019 | Yajamana | Devi Shetty | Kannada | |
| 2019 | Udgharsha | Adhitya | Kannada | |
| 2022 | Khiladi | David | Telugu | |
| 2022 | Tees Maar Khan | Jija | Telugu | |
| 2022 | Bebhan | Uday Patwardhan | Marathi | |
| 2024 | Dharmarakshak Mahaveer Chhatrapati Sambhaji Maharaj | Chhatrapati Sambhaji Maharaj | Marathi | |
| 2025 | Romeo S3 | DCP Sangram Singh Shekawat | Hindi | |
| 2025 | Controll | Major Abhimanyu Shastri | Hindi | |
| 2026 | Raakaasa | Maharaja Prataparudra | Telugu | |

=== Television ===
| Year | Title | Role |
|---|---|---|
| 2011 | Dwarkadheesh Bhagwaan Shree Krishn | Dushasana |
| 2011 | Kahani Chandrakanta Ki | Special appearance |
| 2011 | Chandragupta Maurya | Prince Malayketu |
| 2011 | Jai Bajrangbali | Prince |
| 2011 | Ramayan | Hanuman |
| 2013–2014 | Mahabharat | Dhritarashtra |
| 2014 | Akbar Birbal | Mullah Do Piyaza |
| 2014 | CID | Special appearance |
