= Ekkees Toppon Ki Salaami =

2014 film by Ravindra Gautam

- Directed by: Ravindra Gautam
- Written by: Rahil Qaazi
- Produced by: Saurabh Tewari, Anurradha Prasad Shukla; Abhinav Shukla
- Starring: Anupam Kher; Divyendu Sharma; Manu Rishi; Aditi Sharma; Rajesh Sharma; Neha Dhupia
- Cinematography: Sanjay Memane
- Edited by: Amitabh Shukla; Sanjay Sharma
- Music by: Ram Sampath
- Production company: Nautanki Films
- Distributed by: Jayantilal Gada
- Release date: 10 October 2014
- Running time: 140 minutes
- Country: India
- Language: Hindi
- Box office: ₹1.58 crore

Ekkees Toppon Ki Salaami (transl. Salute of 21 canons) is a 2014 Indian Hindi satire film directed by Ravindra Gautam and produced by Saurabh Tewari and Abhinav Shukla under the banner of Nautanki Films. The film stars Anupam Kher, Divyendu Sharma, Manu Rishi, Aditi Sharma, Rajesh Sharma and Neha Dhupia in the leading roles and was released in India on 10 October 2014.

== Cast ==
- Anupam Kher as Purushottam Narayan Joshi
  - Aditya Kapadia as young Purushottam (cameo appearance)
- Neha Dhupia as Jayaprabha
- Divyendu Sharma as Subhash Joshi
- Manu Rishi as Shekhar Joshi
- Aditi Sharma as Taanya Srivastav
- Rajesh Sharma as Daya Shankar Pandey
- Achyut Potdar
- Uttara Baokar as Kalawati
- Supriya Kumari as Sushma Joshi
- Bhagwan Tiwari as Abhinav Shivhare
- Sudhir Pandey as Patwardhan
- Aasif Sheikh as Arnab Sharma
- Harshad Kumar as inspector

== Plot ==
Two sons set out to get their father what he had dreamed of all through his life – the ultimate sign of respect. High on thrill and laughter, this film takes the audience through the unbelievable attempts of Shekhar and Subhash Joshi to provide their father, Purushottam, with a 21 gun salute. Purushotam Joshi is a common man who fails to earn his bit of appreciation despite being completely honest during his lifelong service as a government employee. Joshi's sons are, however, willing to go the extra mile to get their father's only wish. But will they succeed in their endeavour?

== Promotion ==
SRK launched the trailer of the Ekkees Toppon Ki Salaami. The song Tod De Kataar was launched in a special event next to the iconic The Common Man statue of RK Laxman, where common people were felicitated for their service to the society.

== Soundtrack ==
Ekkees Toppon Ki Salaami

Soundtrack album by Ram Sampath
- Released: 23 September 2014
- Genre: Feature film soundtrack
- Length: 18:20
- Language: Hindi
- Label: T-Series
External audio
- Audio Jukebox on YouTube

The soundtrack of Ekkees Toppon Ki Salaami consists of 5 songs composed by Ram Sampath the lyrics of which were written by Sandeep Nath.

Tracklist
No.	Title	Singer(s)	Length
1.	"Ghoor Ghoor Ke"	Sona Mohapatra	03:43
2.	"Tod De Kataar"	Labh Janjua, Divya Kumar & Ram Sampath	02:58
3.	"Hum Tumhe Kaise Bataye" (Ghazal)	Aman Trikha & Tarannum Mallik	04:33
4.	"Bitua"	Mohit Chauhan	04:20
5.	"Ekkees Toppon Ki Salaami"	Ram Sampath & Earl Edgar D	02:44
Total length:			18:20

== Critical reception ==
Renuka Vyavahare of The Times of India gave the film a rating of 3.5 out of 5 and said that, "In times where materialistic things have taken precedence over people and good old values, ETKS is one of the most socially relevant films to have come out this year. It's not just a film but a philosophy." Bollywood Hungama gave the film a rating of 3 out of 5 saying that, "Director Ravindra Gautam really needs to be applauded from the bottom of the heart for having come up with such a unique film. The way he has treated the subject and extracted performances from his actors, makes him a director to look forward to in the future." Rachit Gupta of Filmfare reviewed the film saying that, "Ekkees Toppon Ki Salaami isn’t the worst film ever made. It’s got its moments. But when it comes to cinematic quality it has no leg to stand on. It’s just too erratic to merit any credibility." Rajeev Masand of News18 gave the film a rating of 2 out of 5 saying that, "Buried beneath the farcical humor, melodramatic performances and manipulative tear-jerking in Ekkees Toppon Ki Salaami is a well-intentioned message movie about the value of honesty." Prateek Sur of DNA India praised the acting performances of the actors but criticized the length of the film and gave the film a rating of 3 out of 5. Kaushani Banerjee of Deccan Chronicle gave the film a rating of 1.5 out of 5 saying that the movie "falters much like the system it aims to satirize." Paloma Sharma of Rediff gave the film a rating of 3.5 out of 5 and said that, "Ekkees Toppon Ki Salaami could have been flawless but for slightly substandard dialogues and cinematography." Sanjukta Sharma of Live Mint reviewed the film saying that, "Kher leads a cast that drums up the melodrama quite effortlessly, as the film requires. But despite the best of intentions, Ekkees Toppon Ki Salaami is a tiresome film and at least half an hour longer than it should have been."
