= Danny Sapani =

British actor (born 1970)

- Born: 15 November 1970 (age 55); London, England
- Occupation: Actor
- Years active: 1992–present

Danny Sapani (born 15 November 1970) is an English actor. On television, he is known for his roles in the ITV series Ultimate Force (2002–2003) and Harlots (2017–2019), the E4 series Misfits (2009–2010), the Sky Atlantic series Penny Dreadful (2014–2015), the BBC series Black Earth Rising (2018) and Killing Eve (2020), and the Paramount+ series Halo (2022–2024). His films include Singam II (2013), The Siege of Jadotville (2016), Star Wars: The Last Jedi (2017), Black Panther (2018) and Sumotherhood (2023).

== Early life ==
Sapani was born in London, England, one of six children of immigrant Ghanaian parents. He was raised in Hackney, and first pursued his interest in acting at the Weekend Arts College in Kentish Town. He trained at the Central School of Speech and Drama.

== Career ==
Sapani appeared in Danny Boyle's film Trance. His stage credits include August Wilson's Joe Turner's Come and Gone and Radio Golf, Errol John's Caribbean classic Moon on a Rainbow Shawl and The National Theatre production of Euripides' Medea. He has also acted in the 2013 Indian action film, Singam II as drug lord Michael Kong.

In 2021, Sapani played alongside Adrian Lester in the streamed version of Lolita Chakrabarti's Hymn from the Almeida theatre in London. Their performances were described as "captivating, delicately picking out the nuances of two men who are simultaneously complete and broken".

Sapani's TV roles include appearances on Misfits, Ultimate Force and Blackout, while his television guest appearances include Judge John Deed and the Doctor Who episode "A Good Man Goes to War." as Colonel Manton. For the first two seasons, Sapani played the role of Sembene in Showtime's Penny Dreadful.

On 19 August 2019, Deadline reported that Sapani would be joining the cast of the BBC America and AMC series Killing Eve.

Sapani also stars in the 2025 American espionage thriller, The Amateur.

== Filmography ==
=== Film ===
Year	Title	Role	Notes
2001	Tip of My Tongue	Dave's mate	Short film
2001	Hotel	AJ	
2002	Pissboy	Carl	Short film
2002	Anansi	Adolph	
2003	Song for a Raggy Boy	Preston	
2008	The Oxford Murders	Scott	
2009	Perfect	Ike	Short film
2009	Bucco Blanco	Zak	Short film
2010	The Last Jazz Musician	Van Hellier	Short film
2011	Mercenaries	Ambassador	
2012	Hard Boiled Sweets	Leroy	
2012	Tezz	David	Indian Hindi film
2012	Parking Wars	Imam	Short film
2013	Trance	Nate	
2013	Singam II	Danny / Michael Kong	Indian Tamil film
2016	The Siege of Jadotville	Moise Tshombe	
2017	Star Wars: The Last Jedi	Medical Frigate Captain	
2018	Black Panther	M'Kathu	
2018	Tharakaasura	Kalinga	Indian Kannada film; Nominated – Filmibeat Award for Best Villain – Kannada
2021	Ear for Eye	US Adult	
2022	Black Panther: Wakanda Forever	M'Kathu	
2023	Sumotherhood	Leo DeMarco	
2024	The Ministry of Ungentlemanly Warfare	Kambili Kalu	
2025	The Amateur	Caleb Horowitz	

=== Television ===
Year	Title	Role	Notes
1992	The Bill	Leon Davies	Episode: "Getting Through"
1993	Between the Lines	Steve Coogan	Episode: "Crack Up"
1997	Casualty	Walker Bennett	Episode: "Treasure"
1997	Richard II	Bagot	Television movie
1998	Trial & Retribution	Nicky Burton	2 episodes
2000	Fish	Peter Cookson	6 episodes
2001	Holby City	Craig Sefton	Episode: "Family Ties"
2001	Judge John Deed	Johnny Latymer	Episode: "Appropriate Response"
2002–03	Ultimate Force	Cpl. Ricky Mann	12 episodes
2003	Serious and Organized	D.I. Dennis Clifton	6 episodes
2003	In Deep	Davies	2 episodes
2005	Holby City	Kumi Griffin	Episode: "Tuesday's Child"
2005	Little Britain	Derek	Episode: "#3.2"
2006	Blue Murder	Gavin Busby	Episode: "In Deep"
2007	The Bill	Oscar Daniels	7 episodes
2008	Place of Execution	Keith Slocombe	3 episodes
2009–11	Misfits	Tony Morecombe	3 episodes
2010	Garrow's Law	Gustavus Vassa	Episode: "#2.1"
2011	Doctor Who	Colonel Manton	Episode: "A Good Man Goes to War"
2011	Casualty	Paul Caffrey	Episode: "Mea Culpa"
2011	The Jury	DI Scott	Episode: "#2.2"
2011	Shirley	Bobo	Television movie
2011	Documental	Buzzy	Television movie
2012	Blackout	Detective Griffin	2 episodes
2012	The Fear	Wes	4 episodes
2014–15	Penny Dreadful	Sembene	18 episodes
2015	The Bastard Executioner	Berber the Moor	10 episodes
2017	Chewing Gum	Marlon	Episode: "Road Trip"
2017	Broken	Daniel Martin	2 episodes
2017	The Crown	Dr. Kwame Nkrumah	Episode: "Dear Mrs. Kennedy"
2017–19	Harlots	William North	22 episodes
2018	Black Earth Rising	Simon Nyamoya	8 episodes
2019	MotherFatherSon	Jahan Zakari	6 episodes
2019	Traitors	Richard	2 episodes
2020	Killing Eve	Jamie	7 episodes
2022–24	Halo	Captain Jacob Keyes	10 episodes
2023	The Diplomat	Colin Sutherland	6 episodes
2026	Marble Hall Murders	DI Ian Blakeney	3 episodes
TBA	First Day on Earth †	Anya	Filming

=== Video game ===
Year	Title	Role	Notes
2026	Directive 8020	Nolan Stafford	Voice
