= Khiladi (2022 film) =

2022 film by Ramesh Varma

- Theatrical release poster
- Directed by: Ramesh Varma
- Written by: Ramesh Varma
- Produced by: Satyanarayana Koneru; Ramesh Varma
- Starring: Ravi Teja; Unni Mukundan; Arjun; Meenakshi Chaudhary; Dimple Hayathi
- Cinematography: Sujith Vaassudev; G. K. Vishnu
- Edited by: Amar Reddy Kudumula
- Music by: Devi Sri Prasad
- Production companies: Pen Studios; A Studios
- Distributed by: Pen Studios
- Release date: 11 February 2022
- Running time: 154 minutes
- Country: India
- Language: Telugu
- Budget: ₹30 crore

Khiladi (transl. Player) is a 2022 Indian Telugu-language action thriller film written and directed by Ramesh Varma who co-produced it with Satyanarayana Koneru under A Studios. The film stars Ravi Teja, Unni Mukundan, Arjun Sarja, Meenakshi Chaudhary, Dimple Hayathi, Thakur Anoop Singh, Sachin Khedekar and Nikitin Dheer in pivotal roles.

Initially scheduled to be released on 28 May 2021, it was indefinitely postponed due to the COVID-19 pandemic in India. Soundtrack and score of the film are composed by Devi Sri Prasad. Released theatrically along with a Hindi dubbed version on 11 February 2022, the film received mixed to negative reviews from critics and underperformed at the box office.

== Plot ==
Bala Singham is a crime boss who sends a container of ₹10,000 crore (US$1.0 billion) to India to bribe the MLAs to back his father, Guru Singham as the next CM. Pooja is a criminologist who learns about Mohan Gandhi as a part of her research, who was convicted of killing his whole family, except for his daughter. She meets him in prison, but he refuses to talk to her. While seeing him and his daughter's bond, she promises to help him get bail if he narrates his story, to which Gandhi agrees.

Past: Gandhi is an orphan, who is raised by a successful businessman, Rajashekhar and became the General Manager of the company. He lives a happy life with his wife Chitra and their daughter. CBI officer Arjun arrests Rajashekhar in a money laundering case linked with the same ₹10,000 crore (US$1.0 billion) orchestrated by Bala Singam. Guru Singham places two choices for Gandhi: finding the money or letting his family get killed. Gandhi confronts Rajashekhar and learns that Rajashekhar did this to return the favour to Guru Singam, who helped him during his days. Gandhi secretly meets Rajasekhar and decodes the location of the money.

After confirming the same, Gandhi first informs the Home Minister, who informs the same to David (who also wants a share of the money). The Home Minister orders to kill Rajashekhar inside the custody and transports the money. David robs the money, replaces it with fake currency midway, and burns down the container. Arjun finds a note and is proven fake after forensic analysis. David, who was constantly instructed over the phone via an unknown person, kills Gandhi's family except his daughter, but the latter takes the blame to save his daughter.

Present: Pooja arranges a bail using her father's name, DGP Jayaram, to perform final rites to his father-in-law. After learning this, Arjun and Jayaram try to stop him, but Gandhi escapes. Pooja, to her shock, finds that Gandhi's supposedly dead family members are alive and are a part of his crew, where it is revealed that Gandhi is a Dubai-based con artist whose sole aim is to fool everyone and rob the money. Arjun was sent to arrest him in Dubai.

Past: One day, Gandhi learns about the ₹10,000 crore (US$1.0 billion) and planned to steal them, where he hires a club dancer named Aditi (Chitra), whom Bala Singham intends to date and with the help of his gang and Aditi, Gandhi hacks Bala Singham's phone where the location of the money is stored. When Gandhi is about to acquire the money, Arjun arrests him, but he was shot. Arjun passes the information to the government and is posted to the CBI. Suddenly, Gandhi arrives and surrenders himself where he takes the blame for the crimes he did not committed and was given 14 years of rigorous imprisonment. In the prison, he befriended Ramakrishna, whose story was the one which Gandhi narrated to Pooja and used her to get himself released from prison. He also planned to forge the documents so that Pooja would believe what he was telling was true.

Present: Arjun deduces a plan where they could catch David and Gandhi. Outside the court, Gandhi captures David after a shootout, while Singham's men captured Ramakrishna. While confronted, a badly heated David reveals that he did all this based on the instructions of an unknown person who is actually Jayaram. Pooja doesn't believe this, but she finds that all the cash is cryptocurrency. Meanwhile, Singham was about to kill Ramakrishna after denying having any knowledge of the money. However, in the nick of time, Pooja calls Singham and strikes a deal to tell him about the location and lets Ramakrishna leave. During a shootout, Aditi betrays Gandhi and shoots him for the money. While hospitalized, Pooja learns from Gandhi's henchmen that Gandhi was after the money to make a charitable trust for needy people. Pooja tells that she lied to them and her father had all the money in the hard cash. Singham and his men arrives at the location and kills Jayaram's men, but Gandhi arrives and kills all of Singham's henchmen and Singham.

When Gandhi is about to take the money, he suddenly has a change of heart and frees Ramakrishna, who finally meets his daughter. After a showdown with Arjun, he sees Gandhi as a changed person and lets him scott free. Later, Guru Singham is stripped of his ministerial post as the money he used to bribe the MLAs were bogus. It is revealed that Gandhi stole the real money and fooled Singham and everyone all along. At the same time, Gandhi was conversing with Arjun on the phone. Gandhi reveals that he is neither against him nor Singham and Jayaram, but was fighting against the corrupted system's responsibility towards people and wishes good luck to Arjun, who vows to arrest him again.

== Cast ==
- Ravi Teja as Mohan Gandhi/Khiladi/Rama Krishna (Fake)
- Unni Mukundan as Rama Krishna (Real) (extended cameo)
- Arjun Sarja as Arjun Bharadwaj
- Meenakshi Chaudhary as Pooja Jayaram
- Dimple Hayathi as Chitra / Aditi
- Anasuya Bharadwaj as Chandrakala/Chandini
- Rao Ramesh as Raja Shekhar
- Vennela Kishore as Bobby
- Murali Sharma as Puttaparthi
- Mukesh Rishi as Home Minister Guru Singham
- Nikitin Dheer as Bala Singham
- Thakur Anoop Singh as David
- Sachin Khedekar as Jayaram
- Vinodhini Vaidyanathan as Mahalakshmi
- Bharath Reddy as David's Henchmen
- Keshav Deepak
- Baby Sanvitha as Chinnu

== Production ==
Ravi Teja was reported to play dual roles in the film. Meenakshi Chaudhary and Dimple Hayathi are cast as the leads. Principal photography of the film began in November 2020. Few action scenes were shot in Italy in April–May 2021. The second schedule of the film began in June 2021, after a break due to the second wave of COVID-19 pandemic in India.

The filming was completed in September 2021. Arjun Sarja joined the production in December 2020. Unni Mukundan was cast in a pivotal guest role in January 2021. The music of the film is being composed by Devi Sri Prasad.

== Music ==
Khiladi

Soundtrack album by Devi Sri Prasad
- Released: 2022
- Recorded: 2021
- Genre: Soundtrack
- Length: 16:50
- Language: Telugu
- Label: Aditya Music
- Producer: Devi Sri Prasad

Devi Sri Prasad chronology
Good Luck Sakhi (2022)	Khiladi (2022)	Aadavaallu Meeku Joharlu (2022)

Singles from Khiladi
- 1. "Istam" Released: 10 September 2021; 2. "Khiladi" Released: 4 November 2021; 3. "Atta Sudake" Released: 1 January 2022; 4. "Full Kick" Released: 26 January 2022; 5. "Catch Me" Released: 5 February 2022

The soundtrack and score of the film is composed by Devi Sri Prasad. The audio rights were acquired by Aditya Music.

All lyrics are written by Sri Mani.

No.	Title	Singer(s)	Length
1.	"Istam"	Hari Priya	2:46
2.	"Khiladi"	Ram Miriyala	3:28
3.	"Atta Sudake"	Devi Sri Prasad, Sameera Bharadwaj	3:06
4.	"Full Kick"	Mamta Sharma, Sagar	3:53
5.	"Catch Me"	Neha Bhasin, Jaspreet Jasz	3:37
Total length:			16:50

== Release ==
The film's release was originally scheduled for 28 May 2021. Owing to the COVID-19 pandemic in India, the film's release was then postponed indefinitely. The makers soon announced that the film would be released in theatres only. The film was released on 11 February 2022 along with its Hindi dubbed version.

== Reception ==
Khiladi received mixed to negative reviews from critics and audience, who praised Ravi Teja's performance but criticised the direction and screenplay.

Neeshitha Nyayapati of The Times of India gave the film a rating of 2/5 and criticized the screenplay, CGI, and songs, writing, "Khiladi is an absurd, sometimes stylish and oddly wacky, disengaging crime thriller." Pinkvilla gave the film a rating of 2/5 and wrote "'Khiladi' is a template-driven film if you care to scratch the surface. It's just that the writing department seeks to fortify the formulaic story by structuring the film in a less-than-routine manner in the first half".

Reviewing the for The Indian Express, Gabetta Ranjith Kumar appreciated Ravi Teja's performance but felt that the unnecessary songs and inane subplots had put film at a disadvantage.The Hindu critic Y. Sunita Chowdhary called it an "average film," and added "The story lacks logic, tests patience but cannot be written off completely." In an other negative review, The News Minute's Balakrishna Ganeshan gave the film a rating of 1.5/5 and termed it "an unappealing mish-mash, with Ravi Teja playing a predictable role." Ganesh wrote that "The director attempts to deceive the audience with a story similar to Shock. But then he completely changes the trajectory by making it a story of a con artist, who is just invincible, or let's say any average Telugu hero who seems to possess superpowers."

== Remake ==
In early June 2021, actor Salman Khan acquired the remake rights for the film's Hindi version.
