= Lakadiya =

Coordinates: 23.346895°N 70.581091°E

Lakadiya or Lakadia is a village in Bhachau Taluka of Kutch district in Gujarat, India.
