= Girish Sharma =

Indian television presenter and event host

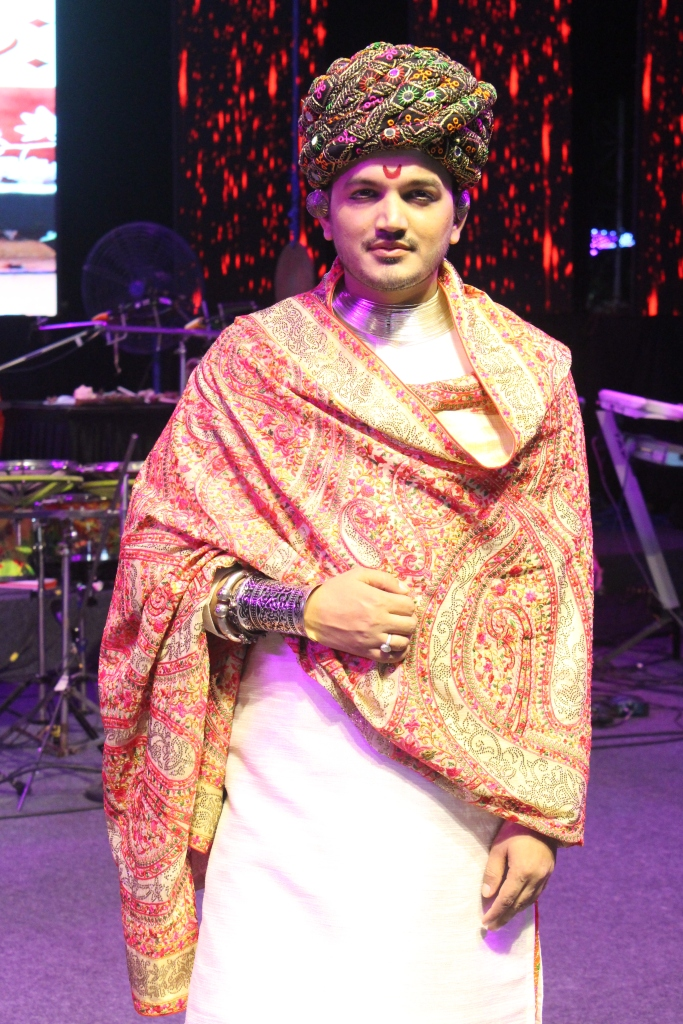
- Sharma in 2019
- Born: 27 August 1985 (age 40); Yamunanagar, Haryana, India
- Occupation: Comedian
- Years active: 2011–present
- Website: www.anchorgirish.com

Girish Sharma (born 27 August 1985) is an Indian television presenter, event host, comedian and entertainer. Girish Sharma also known for his anchor training videos on YouTube. Sharma additionally won the Best Anchor in India Gold Award at the WeddingSutra Influencer Awards 2021.

== Personal life ==
Girish Sharma was born in Yamunanagar,Haryana. His family hails from Biron Dewal Uttrakhand. His father died when he was in 10th class. He did schooling from B D Senior Secondary School Ambala Cantt.

== Career ==
Girish Sharma worked with zoOm TV as a Producer where he also appeared as zoom ki Guthhi in promotional video of Comedy nights with Kapil for zoOm TV. He started his YouTube channel of Anchoring Training Videos.

== Characters By Girish Sharma ==
Title	Role
Events	Guthhi
Events	Gulati
Events	Al Habibi
Events	Rinku Bhabhi
Events	PK
Anniversary of Amitabh Bachchan and Jaya Bachchan	Amitabh Bachchan
Events	Rajpal Yadav
