= 3BHK (soundtrack) =

Soundtrack album by Amrit Ramnath
- Released: 26 June 2025
- Recorded: 2024–2025
- Venues: Chennai; Mumbai; Goa
- Studios: The Mystic’s Room; Atrium; 20dB; The Sanctuary; Ra
- Genre: Feature film soundtrack
- Length: 32:48
- Language: Tamil
- Label: Think Music
- Producer: Amrit Ramnath

Amrit Ramnath chronology
Varshangalkku Shesham (2024)	3BHK (2025)
External audio
- 3BHK (Tamil) - Jukebox on YouTube

Singles from 3BHK
- 1. "Kanavellam" Released: 21 May 2025; 2. "Idi Mazhai" Released: 21 June 2025

3BHK is the soundtrack album to the 2025 film of the same name directed by Sri Ganesh and produced by Arun Viswa of Shanthi Talkies, starring Siddharth, R. Sarathkumar, Devayani, Meetha Raghunath, Chaithra J Achar and Yogi Babu. The film's soundtrack and background score are composed by Amrit Ramnath in his sophomore outing after Varshangalkku Shesham (2024). The album featured nine songs with lyrics written by Karthik Netha, Vivek, Paal Dabba and Ganesh himself. Preceded by two singles—"Kanavellam" and "Idi Mazhai"—the soundtrack was released on 26 June 2025, under the Think Music label.

== Background ==
Amrit Ramnath, who debuted in cinema with the Malayalam film Varshangalkku Shesham (2024), made his Tamil film debut with 3BHK. He felt he was chosen as the film's composer after director Sri Ganesh liked his work in non-film music. Sri Ganesh said that when the album was being conceptualised, he wanted to do soulful music like that of '96 (2018), thinking purely about the music instead of garnering traction through short-form social media contents.

== Release ==
The first single from the album "Kanavellam" was released on 21 May 2025. The second "Idi Mazhai" was released on 21 June. The soundtrack was released by Think Music on 26 June.

== Track listing ==
Tamil
No.	Title	Lyrics	Singer(s)	Length
1.	"Kanavellam"	Sri Ganesh	Ananthu, Kalyani Nair, Uthara Unnikrishnan, Amrit Ramnath	3:29
2.	"Thullum Nenjam"	Karthik Netha	Shreya Ghoshal, Amrit Ramnath	3:53
3.	"Idi Mazhai"	Paal Dabba	Paal Dabba, Amrit Ramnath	3:31
4.	"Oru Kana"	Sri Ganesh	Haricharan	3:41
5.	"Oru Kana" (Reprise)	Sri Ganesh	Siddharth, Frizzell D'souza	3:38
6.	"Kaanalin Mele"	Vivek	Chinmayi Sripaada, Sooraj Santhosh	3:43
7.	"Veezhvena"	Sri Ganesh	Pradeep Kumar	3:36
8.	"Veezhvena" (Reprise)	Sri Ganesh	Amrit Ramnath	3:36
9.	"Veezhvena" (Karaoke)	—	—	3:36
Total length:				32:48

Telugu
No.	Title	Lyrics	Singer(s)	Length
1.	"Kalalanni"	Rakendu Mouli	Hemachandra, Gopika Poornima, Sahithi, P V N S Rohit	3:17
2.	"Bhoome Swargam"	Rakendu Mouli	Sanjana Kalmanje, Sarthak Kalyani	3:53
3.	"Aagiponu Nenu"	Deva	Deva	3:31
4.	"Oka Kala"	Rakendu Mouli	Haricharan	3:41
5.	"Oka Kala" (Reprise)	Rakendu Mouli	Sreekanth Hariharan, Frizzell D'souza	3:38
6.	"Kaanala Daari"	Rakendu Mouli	Sahithi, Sreekanth Hariharan	3:43
7.	"Emundhi"	Chandrabose	Siddharth	3:36
8.	"Emundhi" (Reprise)	—	—	3:36
Total length:				25:22

== Reception ==
Srinivasa Ramanujam of The Hindu stated "Music composer Amrit Ramnath, who dished out a terrific soundtrack in Malayalam filmVarshangalukku Shesham, debuts in Tamil cinema with this and brings along a fresh musical perspective, thus servicing the needs of such a film to the fullest. Peppering the catchy stock musical phrase — ‘Kanavellam Nijamaga...’ — throughout the many phases in the film adds value." Swaroop Kodur of The Indian Express felt that Amrit being over-employed as a result, "the background score is present throughout to nudge us emotionally and the constant coaxing becomes too much to handle after a point, particularly in the second half." A reviewer based at Ananda Vikatan wrote "Music director Amrit Ramnath weaves melancholy through background scores, while songs as montages flow seamlessly." Janani K. of India Today also complimented Amrit's music as one of the positive aspects. S. Viswanath of Deccan Herald wrote "The film is also aided by a soulful background score by debutant Amrit Ramnath, the son of well-known playback singer Bombay Jayashri."

== Personnel ==
Credits adapted from Think Music:

- Music composer, arranger, producer – Amrit Ramnath
- Additional music production – Nitin Muralikrishna, Ashwin Iyer
- Vocal edits – Ashish Kujur, Sindhu Rajaramji, Kishore Atiium, Allan Varghese
- Recording studios – The Mystic's Room (Chennai), Atrium Studios (Chennai), 20db Studios (Chennai), The Sanctuary (Mumbai), Ra Studios (Goa)
- Recording engineers – K. S. Maniratnam, Vishnu M. Namboodhri, Anish Mohan, Hariharan, Vedant Uttarkar, Sunai
- Mixed by – Nitin Muralikrishna
- Mastered by – Ronak Runwal
- Choir – The Indian Choral Ensemble
- Choir members – Kalyani Nair, Aparna Harikumar, Sivaranjini Chandramouli, Nayansee Sharma, Rajeevi Ganesh, Bavathayini Nagarajan, Fathima Henna, Megha Salila, Shibi T S D, Vivin Richards
- Choir conductor – Karthik Manickavasakam
- Children's vocals – Sargam Choir
- Guitar – Keba Jeremiah, Chris Jason, Anurag Rajeev Nayan
- Charango, mandolin – Keba Jeremiah
- Synth bass – Nitin Muralikrishna
- Rebab, banjo, sarod – Anurag Rajeev Nayan
- Flute – Ashish, Navin
- Piano – Allan Varghese
- Percussions – Krishna Kishor
- Violin – Rithu Vysakh, Sayee Rakshith
- Violin, viola, cello – Rithu Vysakh
