= O.M: Operation Mole =

2026 Indian film by Rajkumar Periasamy

- Theatrical release poster
- Directed by: Rajkumar Periasamy
- Written by: Rajkumar Periasamy
- Produced by: Dhanush; Shraddha Agrawal; Azmat Jagmag
- Starring: Dhanush; Mammootty; Sai Pallavi; Sreeleela; Naseeruddin Shah; Indrans
- Cinematography: K. Ezhil Arasu
- Edited by: R. Kalaivanan
- Music by: Sai Abhyankkar
- Production companies: Wunderbar Films; RTake Studios
- Distributed by: see below
- Release date: 20 November 2026
- Running time: 178 minutes
- Country: India
- Language: Tamil

O.M: Operation Mole is a 2026 Indian Tamil-language spy action thriller film written and directed by Rajkumar Periasamy. Produced by Wunderbar Films and RTake Studios, the film features an ensemble cast of Dhanush, Mammootty, Sai Pallavi, Sreeleela, Naseeruddin Shah and Indrans. It follows the efforts of a Special Task Force agent (Pallavi) and her undercover agent (Dhanush) to crack down on the red sandalwood smuggling network in Andhra Pradesh.

The film was officially announced in November 2024 under the tentative title D55, denoting Dhanush's 55th film as a lead actor. Originally backed by Gopuram Films, the project was later moved to Wunderbar Films, with RTake Studios joining as co-producer. Principal photography commenced in February 2026 and continued till August, with the official title OM Chapter 1: Udhiram – The Blood Wood announced in June. The film has music composed by Sai Abhyankkar, cinematography handled by Ezhil Arasu K and editing by R. Kalaivanan. It was retitled a week before release.

O.M: Operation Mole was released worldwide on 20 November 2026 in theatres and received mixed reviews from critics with praise towards the cast performances, production values, soundtrack and action sequences while criticism was directed towards the excessive runtime, editing, screenplay, pacing and background score.

== Plot ==
CBI officer Nithya Reddy starts Operation Mole (O.M) to crack down a red sandalwood smuggling network in Andhra Pradesh. Pazhanivel "Pazhani" gains the trust of Burma Karthikeyan aka Siya, a powerful smuggler as part of O.M. However, Pazhani struggles to balance his loyalty towards Siya and his mission, leading to events affecting his life, family, purpose, and path.

== Cast ==
- Dhanush as S. Pazhanivel "Pazhani" / Thirukumaran (Agent D-402)
- Mammootty as Burma Karthikeyan "Siya" / Red Hills Karthikeyan
- Sai Pallavi as ASP Nithya Reddy IPS
- Sreeleela as Roja, Pazhani's wife
- Naseeruddin Shah as Abdul Hameed
- Indrans as M. Shanmugam, Pazhani's father
- Renu Desai as Amala, Karthikeyan's wife
- Kalairani
- Lallu as Karuppu
- Sanjay Swaroop as Krishnaiah
- TSK as Thandiyappan
- Dheena

== Production ==
=== Development ===
In March 2024, it was reported that actor Dhanush could be teaming up with director Rajkumar Periasamy, who was then completing Amaran (2024). That December, Rajkumar discussed the story he had chosen for Dhanush. He explained that the film would focus on "unsung heroes" who live within society without being widely known. The protagonist, played by Dhanush, would represent one of the figures.

Later, in March 2025, Rajkumar said that the film was not originally written specifically for Dhanush. When he first met the actor, Dhanush gave him freedom to choose whichever of his ideas he wanted to develop. Rajkumar eventually presented two different story ideas, from which Dhanush selected the one based on a real-life incident. Rajkumar stated that the film is "based on real life incidents converged into a fictional story".

On 8 November 2024, the collaboration was officially announced. Rajkumar announced that he would direct Dhanush in his 55th film as a leading actor, provisionally titled D55. The announcement came only about a week after Amaran's theatrical release. The initial producers were G. N. Anbu Chezhiyan and Sushmita Anbu Chezhiyan of Gopuram Films, reuniting with Dhanush after Thanga Magan (2015). The project was launched with a muhurat puja ceremony attended by the film's cast and crew, along with filmmaker Vetrimaaran.

=== Pre-production ===
Pre-productions works were underway by December 2024. In March 2025, Rajkumar said that filming was expected to begin around June 2025, because Dhanush had several other projects occupying his schedule. The following November, reports emerged that Gopuram Films had stepped away from the project because of an alleged increase in production costs. There was also speculation that Dhanush's Wunderbar Films would take over, and Kamal Haasan's Raaj Kamal Films International might join producing the project.

On 22 January 2026, the production change became official. Wunderbar Films joined with RTake Studios, which last produced Salaam Venky (2022), to produce the film. On 29 January, Sai Abhyankkar was officially announced as composer. By February 2026, the technical crew, consisting of cinematographer Ezhil Arasu K, editor R. Kalaivanan, publicity designer Kabilan Chelliah and art director Rajeevan, had been announced. On 18 June, the official title OM Chapter 1: Udhiram – The Blood Wood was announced. The title references Om, and Rajkumar said it was chosen because the story takes place "between two temple towns, Tirupati and Thiruvannamalai", and because it is the name of a police operation in the film. With the launch of the trailer in November 2026, just one week before the film's theatrical release, it was retitled O.M: Operation Mole.

=== Casting ===
Before the final female cast was announced, Pooja Hegde was reported as being considered for the project. In November 2025, Sai Pallavi's possible casting began circulating in reports. By February 2026, her participation became official. Her casting reunites her with Dhanush after Maari 2 (2018) and Rajkumar after Amaran. Sreeleela was officially announced as the part of the cast on 31 January 2026. The project marked her first collaboration with Dhanush and second Tamil film after Parasakthi (2026). Mammootty's casting was officially announced on 4 February 2026, making his return to Tamil cinema after seven years since Peranbu (2018), as well as reunion with Dhanush after Proprietors: Kammath & Kammath (2013) in which Dhanush made a cameo appearance.

In his 2026 interview, Rajkumar revealed that Mammootty had been his first choice for the character even before principal photography. He subsequently explained that he spent approximately seven months trying to get Mammootty to accept the role. The actor reportedly received ₹24 crore (US$2.6 million) as remuneration. In late May, it was reported that Indrans was in talks to join the film. He was subsequently confirmed as part of the cast, during the June title announcement.

Hindi actor Naseeruddin Shah joined the project later than the principal cast members. His casting was announced in July 2026. Shah's participation marks his return to Tamil cinema approximately 26 years after Hey Ram (2000). Rajkumar stated that he cast Indrans after being impressed with his performance in the Malayalam film Home (2021), that Mammootty's character was inspired by the gangster characters in Martin Scorsese's films, and although Shah was in the United States when Rajkumar sent him the script, he still agreed to act. Pallavi's looks were inspired by Merin Joseph, a police officer.

=== Filming ===
Filming did not begin in June 2025 as initially expected. It began in early February 2026, following the producer change and the finalisation of the principal cast. Reports indicate that filming began in Chennai and subsequently moved to locations including Chengalpattu and other areas around Tamil Nadu. One reported schedule involved a large purpose-built temple/festival set constructed outside Chennai. The sequence reportedly involved Dhanush and Mammootty, while a later schedule was planned to include a song featuring Dhanush and Sreeleela. In May, choreographer Sandy revealed that they had shot a major song choreographed by him, featuring Dhanush. He said Dhanush would be dancing throughout the song, rather than appearing only briefly, and described the performance as particularly energetic.

At the title launch on 18 June, Rajkumar stated that approximately 60–65% of filming had been completed. In July, the production moved to Malaysia for what was described as the final shooting schedule. Dhanush, Mammootty and Naseeruddin Shah were reported to be involved in this schedule. On 31 July, Mammootty completed his portions. Mammootty Kampany, his production company, confirmed that he had returned to Kochi after completing his work. By early August, filming was also taking place around the Tiruvannamalai district. Dhanush was reported to be filming near the Annamalaiyar Temple, with reports identifying this as part of the final phase of production. Principal photography wrapped the same month.

== Music ==
The soundtrack is composed by Sai Abhyankkar, in his first collaboration with Dhanush and Rajkumar. An instrumental number, "The Wild Theme" was released in late June 2026. The first single "Alaakaa Loova" was released on 28 July, Dhanush's birthday. "Siya Entry", an instrumental accompanying the teaser introducing Mammootty's character, was released on 7 September. The second single "Veezha Veera" was released on 19 October. The instrumental "OM Special Duty" was released on 26 October 2026. The third single "Senjudare" was released on 4 November 2026. The audio launch was held on 6 November at Sri Sairam College of Engineering, Chennai. The fourth single "Fa Fa Fa" was released on 8 November 2026, coinciding with Diwali.

No.	Title	Lyrics	Singer(s)	Length
1.	"The Wild Theme"	Dhanush	Sai Abhyankkar	1:45
2.	"Alaakaa Loova"	Rokesh	Sai Abhyankkar	3:29
3.	"Siya Entry"	Vettori	Daniel	1:52
4.	"Veezha Veera"	Arun Srinivasan	Tippu, Sai Abhyankkar, Daniel	3:56
5.	"OM Special Duty"	–	Sai Smriti, Shreya Sreerag	1:48
6.	"Senjudare"	Adesh Krishna	Sai Abhyankkar, Harini	3:01
7.	"Fa Fa Fa"	Thamizh Aadhavan	Sai Abhyankkar, Thamizh Aadhavan	2:56
Total length:				18:47

== Release ==
=== Theatrical ===
O.M: Operation Mole was released theatrically on 20 November 2026 worldwide, in standard and Dolby Cinema formats. Earlier it was scheduled to release on 16 October, but was delayed to avoid clashing with Jailer 2, which secured a 15 October release. The team also decided against releasing it in the week of Diwali to avoid clashing with Scene which was released on 6 November.

=== Distribution ===
The film was distributed by AGS Cinemas in Tamil Nadu, by Binu George Alexander Productions in Kerala, by Sithara Entertainment in Andhra Pradesh and Telangana, and by Mythri Movie Makers in Nizam. Pen Marudhar acquired the theatrical distribution rights for North India. In North America, the distribution rights went to Prime Media, with York Cinemas handling the Canadian release of the film.

=== Home media ===
The digital streaming rights were acquired by Netflix.

== Reception ==
Janani K of India Today rated the film 3/5 and wrote, "While Dhanush and Mammootty deliver committed performances, Sai Pallavi emerges as the film's biggest strength. Despite its narrative blocks and missed opportunities, the film has moments that leave an impression". Latha Srinivasan of NDTV rated the film 3.5/5 and wrote, "Dhanush and Mammootty make this spy thriller an engaging cinematic experience, while director Rajkumar Periasamy brings his distinctive storytelling to the murky world of red sandalwood smugglers". M Suganth of The Times of India rated the film 3/5 and wrote, "O.M: Operation Mole stays true to its title. It's a faithful narration of a police operation to plant a mole in a redwood smuggling gang and nab its kingpin. As with his previous films, Rangoon and Amaran, the filmmaker gives us a richly detailed world and its many players, with a clear peek into the modus operandi of both the cops and the criminals".

Avinash Ramachandran of Cinema Express wrote, "A compelling spy drama about deception, duty, and deliverance shouldn't have been dragged down by a sense of dreariness". Vishal Menon of The Hollywood Reporter India said the film "may not give you closure, but it deserves a lot of love for creating three incredible characters and the endless number of films that could be built around them". Rajagopalan Venkataraman of Khaleej Times rated the film 4/5, praising the "well-written characters, tight editing" and "engaging music score", concluding, "O.M Chapter 1 grips you from the first scene and keeps you invested throughout, despite the odd bump or two."
