= 3BHK =

2025 Indian film by Sri Ganesh

- Theatrical release poster
- Directed by: Sri Ganesh
- Screenplay by: Sri Ganesh
- Based on: 3BHK Veedu by Aravindh Sachidanandam
- Produced by: Arun Viswa
- Starring: Siddharth; R. Sarathkumar; Devayani; Meetha Raghunath; Chaithra
- Cinematography: Dinesh B. Krishnan; Jithin Stanislaus
- Edited by: Ganesh Siva
- Music by: Amrit Ramnath
- Production company: Shanthi Talkies
- Release date: 4 July 2025
- Running time: 141 minutes
- Country: India
- Language: Tamil

3BHK (Note: Refers to an Indian apartment with three bedrooms, one hall and one kitchen.) is a 2025 Indian Tamil-language coming-of-age drama film written and directed by Sri Ganesh and produced by Arun Viswa under Shanthi Talkies. Based on the short story 3BHK Veedu (transl. 3BHK house) by Aravindh Sachidanandam, the film stars Siddharth, R. Sarathkumar, Devayani, Meetha Raghunath and Chaithra J Achar (in her Tamil debut) with Yogi Babu, Subbu Panchu, Vivek Prasanna and Thalaivasal Vijay in supporting roles. It follows the prolonged struggles of a family to purchase a three-bedroom house while dealing with their personal problems.

The film was officially announced in May 2024 under the tentative title Siddharth 40 as it marked the actor's 40th film in the lead role, with the official title being revealed during February 2025. Principal photography commenced in July 2024 and continued till March 2025, with the film being predominantly shot in Chennai. The music was composed by Amrit Ramnath, with cinematography handled by Dinesh B. Krishnan and Jithin Stanislaus, and edited by Ganesh Siva.

3BHK was released in theatres on 4 July 2025. The film opened to positive reviews from critics and audiences.

== Plot ==
In 2006, Vasudevan, his wife Shanthi, and their teenage children, Prabhu and Aarthi, move into a rented house near St. Thomas Mount, Chennai. Prabhu is unhappy with the small house, especially as rents continue to rise in Chennai. Vasudevan urges him to adjust despite the discomfort. The family's main goal is to save money and buy their own home. Vasudevan has saved around ₹7.5 lakh (equivalent to ₹24 lakh or US$28,000 in 2023) and is looking for a house in the outskirts that fits their budget. However, he prefers a house in the city, which costs around ₹15 lakh (equivalent to ₹48 lakh or US$57,000 in 2023). Aarthi calculates that they need to save ₹25,000 (equivalent to ₹80,000 or US$950 in 2023) per month, along with selling Shanthi's jewels, to reach their goal. To increase their income, Vasudevan's boss, Mehta, gives him a raise with additional overtime pay. Shanthi starts preparing snacks to sell to local stores. Prabhu struggles in his studies, so Vasudevan enrolls him in a tuition centre for ₹1,000 (equivalent to ₹3,200 or US$38 in 2023) per month. With the help of tuition and his crush, Aishwarya "Aishu," Prabhu's grades improve.

During the public exams, Prabhu becomes anxious about his family's expectations and loses focus. He scores averagely, and to his dismay, Aishu fails and leaves town without informing Prabhu. Vasudevan is disappointed in Prabhu's performance and vents his frustration on the house owner. To secure a seat for Prabhu in an engineering college, the family uses up their savings for the management quota. In 2007, Vasudevan's outburst leads to their eviction, and they move to a smaller house in Pallavaram. During college admissions, the principal convinces Prabhu to pursue IT despite his interest in mechanical engineering. Prabhu struggles in college and fails an exam.

In 2008, Aarthi excels in her SSLC exams, and the family considers shifting her to a private school for better opportunities. However, she chooses to stay in the government school to help the family save for their dream of owning a house. Vasudevan has saved ₹15 lakh for a house, but when he approaches a builder, he discovers that prices have increased due to higher guideline values. The house now costs ₹25 lakh (equivalent to ₹82 lakh or US$88,000 in 2026), crushing Vasudevan's dream. Prabhu feels like a failure in education and considers quitting. However, after hearing his father's encouraging words, he decides to persevere for his family's sake. Secretly, Prabhu and his friend Kalai take up part-time work at a lathe shop to fund their education.

After Mehta falls ill, his son takes over the business and tasks Vasudevan with learning Tally software within a month. Aarthi joins him at a computer coaching centre, and Vasudevan passes the Tally exam. When Vasudevan discovers Prabhu's part-time job, he advises him to focus on his studies, promising to cover all expenses. Vasudevan suffers a heart attack due to work stress and is diagnosed with two blocked arteries. The surgery is successful but depletes the family's savings. For the first time, Vasudevan seeks help from his brother, Murali, who agrees but demands Prabhu's job offer letter as security. Prabhu, who has done well in his placement rounds, fails the final interview due to engaging in rote learning over meaningful learning. Instead, his friend Kalai is selected at Zenithcode, where Prabhu was rejected. The family is devastated by his failure, and their situation worsens when floods damage their home, forcing them to relocate to Perungalathur.

In 2011, following Mehta's death, Vasudevan loses his job. To support the family, Prabhu takes up odd jobs despite his lack of interest. Vasudevan, seeing his son struggle, encourages him to prepare for competitive exams. However, Prabhu fails again, leading to frustration. Just when things seem bleak, Kalai invites him to a job interview. Motivated by his father, Prabhu attends the interview with confidence and secures the job, becoming a permanent employee.

Five years later, Prabhu and Aarthi's financial situation improves, and they arrange a home loan to buy a flat in Guduvancheri. However, when Murali proposes a marriage alliance for Aarthi, Vasudevan decides to prioritise her marriage, delaying their dream of homeownership. Prabhu convinces Aarthi to accept the proposal. After Aarthi's marriage, the family incurs expenses of ₹35 lakh (equivalent to ₹55 lakh or US$59,000 in 2026), which Prabhu has to repay. To manage the financial burden, Prabhu's marriage is arranged with Madhu, the daughter of a wealthy businessman, Sundar. Despite his reservations, Prabhu agrees. During the wedding preparations, he unexpectedly encounters Aishu, now a salesgirl. They go for a walk, and Aishu reveals that during their public exams, her mother had been hospitalised due to her father's abusive behaviour, prompting her to distance herself from Prabhu without explanation. Realising his enduring love for her, Prabhu proposes, and they decide to marry, cancelling his engagement to Madhu, much to Vasudevan's dismay.

Five years later, in 2021, Prabhu is happily married to Aishu, but Vasudevan has stopped speaking to them. Meanwhile, Prabhu's housing loan is approved, and Aarthi is facing abuse at her in-laws' home. After a violent incident, she returns to Vasudevan's house with her baby daughter. Aarthi confesses that she hid her suffering, feeling guilty for having derailed the family's dream of owning a house due to her costly wedding. Vasudevan eventually begins speaking to Aishu, and Aarthi helps rebuild the bond between Prabhu and Vasudevan.

At work, Prabhu's vindictive manager denies him an appraisal. Prabhu feels unfulfilled in his job and becomes hesitant to sign the housing loan, fearing it will trap him in a job he dislikes. He shares his desire for a simple, peaceful life with his family, rather than constantly chasing wealth. Vasudevan understands and supports his decision to leave IT. Inspired by Aishu, Prabhu decides to study mechanical engineering. Aarthi also starts anew, applying for divorce and beginning her own career. Prabhu returns to the lathe shop to fund his education. Aarthi starts working and preparing for banking exams, eventually securing a job at a bank as an associate. Prabhu earns his degree.

By 2027, Prabhu has become a successful mechanical engineer and a well-renowned technician. He takes his family to their new home, fulfilling the dream Vasudevan had long cherished. The film ends with Vasudevan unpacking the nameplate "Vasudevan & Family," and Aarthi assigning rooms in the new flat.

== Cast ==
- Siddharth as Prabhu Vasudevan
- R. Sarathkumar as Vasudevan
- Devayani as Shanthi Vasudevan
- Meetha Raghunath as Aarthi Vasudevan
- Chaithra J Achar as Aishwarya "Aishu"
- Subbu Panchu as Murali
- Sa. Sathish Kumar as Kalai
- Durai Ramesh as Mehta
- Vivek Prasanna as the manager of Vortex
- Thalaivasal Vijay as Sundar
- Saraswathi Menon as Madhu
- Avudaiyappan as an interviewer from Zenithcode
- Ramesh Vaidya as the house owner
- Seema as the house owner's wife
- Priya Rajkumar as the house owner's daughter
- Selvam as the Perungalathur broker
- Kovai Babu Khan as MRT Nagar broker
- Mahadev Payyakkal as the factory owner
- K. Dileepan as a builder
- Vijay Balaji as the grocery shop owner
- Anand CR as the doctor
- Aarti Desai as Prabhu's school principal
- Yogi Babu as Broker Babu
- Karthi as the house (narrator; voice-over)
- Rana Daggubati as the house (narrator, voice-over; Telugu version)

== Production ==
=== Development ===
On 17 May 2024, actor Siddharth announced his next project to be directed by Sri Ganesh in his third directorial venture after 8 Thottakkal (2017) and Kuruthi Aattam (2022). Tentatively titled Siddharth 40 as it marked the 40th film of Siddharth as a lead actor, the project was funded by Arun Viswa's Shanthi Talkies in their third production after Prince (2022) and Maaveeran (2023). The film's title 3BHK was announced on 5 February 2025.

The film is based on the short story 3BHK Veedu written by Aravindh Sachidanandam. Ganesh added that "[The story] was beautiful and real. It centered around a family wishing to buy a home... the end was poignant. Plotwise, that story has nothing to do with my 3BHK, but the emotion in it stuck a chord with me. I wanted to flesh out an entire life journey from that emotion." The technical crew consists of music composer Amrit Ramnath, cinematographers Dinesh B. Krishnan and Jithin Stanislaus, editor Ganesh Siva and art director Vinoth Rajkumar.

=== Casting ===
Siddharth said he had to be a specific person throughout the film without catering to commercial requirements, while opining on his exciting performances were playing a flesh-and-blood hero with the character staying throughout, citing Eswaran from Chithha (2023). He added that his character Prabhu travels through different time periods from his teens to adulthood. In July 2024, it was announced that R. Sarathkumar and Devayani were cast in important roles; their casting gained attention due to their earlier pairing Surya Vamsam (1997). In the same week, Meetha Raghunath and Kannada actress Chaithra J Achar were also cast; the latter in her Tamil debut. Chaithra, a non-Tamil speaker, had to learn the language, memorising the dialogues as well as acting, which she found somewhat challenging. She dubbed her own voice in both the original Tamil and dubbed Telugu versions. Karthi has a voiceover role as the narrator, while Rana Daggubati took that role in Telugu.

=== Filming ===
A formal puja ceremony was held at Chennai on 15 July 2024, with the presence of the cast and crew, and principal photography commenced the same day. The film was predominantly shot in Chennai before wrapping on 5 March 2025.

== Music ==
The film score and soundtrack were composed by Amrit Ramnath, the son of veteran singer Bombay Jayashri, in his sophomore composition after Varshangalkku Shesham (2024) and also in his Tamil debut. The album was preceded by two singles—"Kanavellam" and "Idi Mazhai"—which were released on 21 May and 21 June 2025, respectively. The soundtrack was released on 26 June 2025 under the Think Music label.

== Marketing and release ==
The film's title teaser was released on 5 February 2025, showcasing a glimpse of the plot and the characters. The trailer was launched at the film's pre-release event which was held in Chennai on 26 June. Shanthi Talkies released a promotional video on 27 June, the same date as the release of Surya Vamsam and the team enacted the family photograph scene from the film. A promotional billboard of the film featured an advertising that mentioned "3BHK ~~₹75 lakhs~~ at just ₹150". It garnered attention and praise for its unorthodox marketing. 3BHK was released theatrically on 4 July 2025 in Tamil and Telugu languages. It began streaming on Amazon Prime Video from 1 August.

== Reception ==
Janani K of India Today gave 3.5/5 stars and wrote "3BHK is a layered, emotional documentation of a middle-class family's dream and the work and sacrifices it demands. With strong performances and realistic yet thought-provoking moments, this feel-good entertainer will linger long after the end credits roll." Abhinav Subramanian of The Times of India gave 3/5 stars and wrote "3 BHK constructs its narrative like its titular apartment: functional, predictable, and standard." Srinivasa Ramanujam of The Hindu wrote "The most refreshing part of 3BHK is the absence of a singular hero. When you walk out of the cinema hall, it is the image of the four-member family that sticks with you. In a year that gave us Kudumbasthan and Tourist Family, 3BHK is a worthy addition to the list of feel-good entertainers. It shines light on the family, without veering into any unnecessary commercial elements such as fights or songs. 3BHK feels like a tight hug of reassurance." Raisa Nasreen of Times Now wrote "Over all, 3BHK strikes the right chord and conveys the perfect emotions of many middle class families, leaving you teary eyed, a few times." Swathi P Ajith of Onmanorama wrote "'3BHK' may not break new ground in storytelling, but it finds its footing in performances and the emotional truth of its characters. It's a film that understands the quiet weight of middle-class dreams and reminds us that sometimes, even the most familiar stories can resonate when told with honesty."

Vishal Menon of The Hollywood Reporter India wrote "The performances of the family members add to our heartbreak just as much as the writing does. Despite Sarathkumar's towering physique and body language, he's able to express the helplessness of a meek man who forgot to live for himself [...] the same can be said about Siddharth and Meetha, who perform their roles with such understated softness that we almost do not notice two bright-eyed, optimistic teenagers growing up to become defeated as adults. Through this journey, Amrit Ramnath's music celebrates their life's rare victories to give it the scale of a triumph, just as Sri Ganesh's writing never allows for his film to enter melodramatic territory. In that effort, we're left with a film with so full of emotions that we feel right at home with Vasudevan and family. Instead of counting the number of storeys, it reminds you to look up at the apartment next door and recount the stories people live through to make their homes." Swaroop Kodur of The Indian Express gave 3/5 and wrote "The contrived nature of 3BHK ultimately becomes a hard-to-ignore flaw and consequently, the film doesn't entirely manage to fulfill its potential. Both the writing and the execution feel overstated at times, and the resolution, too, comes off a tad sticky-sweet. And yet, it has the ambition to tread a lesser-walked path and in doing so, it produces some memorable moments that are sure to linger and make up for the missteps. Heartfelt yet heavy, this is a film that should be given a chance just for the resonance it strikes with us."

In a negative review, Prashanth Vallavan of Cinema Express wrote "3BHK should have either committed to being an out-and-out feel-good drama about a family of lovable characters striving towards a common goal, or it should have gone deeper into the systemic struggles faced by a middle-class family and critiqued the system, which it clearly had immense potential for [...] the film doesn't sugarcoat these dreams as rosy fantasies but as very real struggles, which makes it truthful. But these obstacles and struggles are often borne of Prabhu and his family's own shortcomings and not because of an unfair system. If only the film stopped blaming its own characters and understood the multi-layered structural issues in our society, it could have been a consummate social drama, instead of a synthetic heart warmer." Similarly, Kirubakar Purushothaman of News18 wrote "[3BHK] could have been a statement about the paradox of the middle-class dream of buying a home that, in essence, robs one of every other joy: a thesis that Balumahendra's gut-wrenching 1988 film Veedu delivered. But [it] ends up as a romantic advertisement of such dreams."
