= Kanna Ravi =

Indian actor

- Born: 6 May 1995 (age 31); Chennai, Tamil Nadu, India
- Education: Bharath Institute of Higher Education and Research
- Occupation: Producer
- Years active: 2018–present

Kanna Ravi is an Indian actor who has appeared in Tamil language films. After making his film debut in the Tamil film Veera (2018), he has been in films such as Kaithi (2019), Rathasaatchi (2022) and Lover (2024).

== Career ==
Kanna Ravi began his acting career in 2012, training under the guidance of Balu Mahendra, and initially worked on a number of short films. Notably, he played the lead role in Dheeraj Vaidy's original pilot sort film Jil Jung Juk, as well as a pivotal role in the web series Livin. He made his film debut through Veera (2018), working alongside actor Kreshna. He was later seen in films including Lokesh Kanagaraj's Kaithi (2019) and Sri Ganesh's Kuruthi Aattam (2022), where he worked alongside Atharvaa.

He played his first role as the main protagonist in Rafiq Ismail's Rathasaatchi (2022), an action drama based on Jeyamohan's short story Kaithigal.

== Filmography ==
=== Films ===
Year	Film	Role	Notes
2018	Veera	Sura Murugan	
2019	Kaithi	Ajas Ahmed (Sampath)	
2021	Mandela	Mathi	
2022	Saani Kaayidham	Maari	
2022	Kuruthi Aattam	Muthu	
2022	Rathasaatchi	Appu	
2024	Lover	Madhan	
2025	Coolie	Arjun	

=== Streaming television ===
Year	Title	Role	Platform	Notes
2017	Livin		YouTube	
2021	I Hate You I Love You: Chapter-1 : Alarm	Rahul	YouTube	
2022	Fingertip		Zee5	
2024	Inspector Rishi	Ayyanar	Amazon Prime Video	
2025	Madurai Paiyanum Chennai Ponnum	Subash	Aha Tamil	
2025	Veduvan	Sooraj	ZEE5	
