= Corona Papers =

2023 Indian Malayalam by Priyadarshan

- Theatrical release poster
- Directed by: Priyadarshan
- Screenplay by: Priyadarshan
- Story by: Sri Ganesh
- Based on: 8 Thottakkal by Sri Ganesh
- Produced by: Priyadarshan
- Starring: Shane Nigam; Shine Tom Chacko; Siddique; Jean Lal; Gayathrie
- Cinematography: Divakarmani
- Edited by: M. S. Aiyappan Nair
- Music by: KP
- Production company: Four Frames Sound Company
- Distributed by: Four Frames Release
- Release date: 6 April 2023
- Running time: 153 minutes
- Country: India
- Language: Malayalam

Corona Papers is a 2023 Indian Malayalam-language action thriller film directed and produced by Priyadarshan. The film is a remake of Tamil film 8 Thottakkal which itself is inspired from Akira Kurosawa's 1949 film Stray Dog. The film is produced by Four Frames Sound Company, with cinematography by Divakarmani and music by KP. The film received mixed reviews from critics.

== Plot ==
A rookie cop named Rahul loses his service revolver. As the story progresses, it becomes clear that the missing revolver is not just a minor hiccup, but rather the focal point of the entire plot. It is intricately connected to many other significant events, including a significant bank robbery and a series of murders.

As the central piece of the script, the missing weapon plays a vital role in moving the story forward. Its disappearance creates a sense of urgency and mystery, driving Rahul and his team to investigate and uncover the truth behind its disappearance. As they delve deeper into the investigation, they begin to unravel a web of interconnected crimes, all of which lead back to the missing revolver.

As the investigation progresses, it becomes clear that the missing revolver is connected to the murders of several people. With each new development in the case, the missing revolver becomes more and more important, eventually leading to a thrilling conclusion.

== Cast ==
- Shane Nigam as SI Rahul Nambiar
- Siddique as SI Shankararaman / Govindan Nambiar (Fake)
- Sandhya Shetty as SP Gracy IPS
- Shine Tom Chacko as Kaakka Pappi
- Hannah Reji Koshy as Rani
- Jean Paul Lal as Tony
- Gayathrie as Veena, a reporter and Rahul's girlfriend
- Vineeth Sreenivasan as Musthafa
- Maniyanpilla Raju as CI Ayyappan Pillai
- Nibin Navas as News Reporter
- Vijilesh Karayad
- Sreedhanya as Shankararaman's daughter-in-law
- Geethi Sangeetha

== Production ==
The pooja ceremony of the film was held on 27 October 2022. The first look of the film was released on 5 March 2023. The trailer was released 26 March.

== Release ==
The film was theatrically released on 6 April 2023. The film was made available for digital streaming on 5 May 2023 on Disney+ Hotstar.

== Reception ==
=== Box office ===
The film collected Rs 750,000 at the Kerala box office on its opening day.

=== Critical response ===
The film was released 6 April 2023 in theatres and received lukewarm reviews. Sajin Shrijith, critic of Cinema Express, gave 2.5 out of 5 stars and stated that "Oddly enough, despite Priyadarshan's interesting modifications to the original story, the film's failure to make one emotionally invested and its inability to find a fittingly logical resolution to all its threads work heavily against it". Anjana George, critic from The Times of India, gave 2.5 out 5 stars and wrote that "Nevertheless, the film fails to engage as the characters lack depth." S. R. Praveen, critic of The Hindu, noted that "Priyadarshan's latest tryst with the thriller genre is an average affair". Swathi P Ajith, critic of Onmanorama, noted that "Corona Papers' is a must-watch for those who are interested in mazy suspense thrillers. Sanjith Sidhardhan, critic for OTTplay, stated that "For a crime thriller, Corona Papers ends up as a rather tedious watch due to its intent-less characters and meandering storytelling" and gave 2 out of 5 stars.

== See also ==
- Remakes of films by Akira Kurosawa
