= Lallu =

Indian actor and lyricist

- Born: Lallu Prasath
- Other name: Rangoon Lallu
- Occupations: Actor; lyricist
- Years active: 2014–present

Lallu is an Indian actor and lyricist, who works in Tamil-language films. He is known for his collaborations with Rajkumar Periasamy in Rangoon (2017), Amaran (2024), and O.M: Operation Mole (2026).

== Career ==
Lallu started his career as an actor by acting in several short films. He debuted as a lyricist for Inga Enna Solluthu (2014) and wrote a song for Virattu (2014). In a soundtrack album review of Inga Enna Solluthu, the reviewer wrote that "‘Cute-ana’ sung by Naresh Iyer and written by Lallu, is enjoyable". That same year, he received a role in R. Parthiban's Kathai Thiraikathai Vasanam Iyakkam (2014) after Keerthana, Parthiban's daughter, watched one of his short films and suggested him for a role. He played supporting roles in Chennai 600028 II (2016) and 8 Thottakkal (2017) before he starred in Rangoon (2017). He garnered acclaim for playing one of Gautham Karthik's friends in the film. Lallu had also written a song titled "Foreign Return" for the film that contained Burmese lyrics. He has since played supporting roles in several films including Sarkar (2018), Kaithi (2019), Master (2021) and Amaran (2024).

== Filmography ==
- All films are in Tamil, unless otherwise noted.

Key
†	Denotes films that have not yet been released

=== As actor ===
Films

Year	Title	Role	Notes
2014	Kathai Thiraikathai Vasanam Iyakkam	Murthy	
2016	Chennai 600028 II	Cricket player	
2017	8 Thottakkal	Kathir	
2017	Rangoon	Kumaran (Atho Kumar)	
2018	Sarkar	IIT student	
2018	Kalavani Mappillai	Deva's friend	
2019	Kaithi	Chittu	
2019	Sangathamizhan	Sangathamizhan's friend	
2020	Naan Sirithal	Rohith	
2020	Dharala Prabhu	Satish	
2020	Mushroom Manithargal	Actor	Short film
2021	Master	Prisoner	
2022	Naai Sekar	Delivery boy	
2022	D Block	Lallu	
2024	Siren	Manikandan	
2024	Amaran	Sepoy Ravi Shankar	
2025	Madraskaaran	Sathya's friend	
2026	Con City	Karthi	
2026	O.M: Operation Mole	Karuppu	

Web series

Year	Title	Role	Platform	Notes
2018	Vella Raja	Aadira's assistant	Amazon Prime Video	
2019	Mitta	Lallu	ZEE5	
2019	Dhunki		ZEE5	
2026	Resort	Rajan	Hotstar Specials	

=== As lyricist ===
Year	Title	Song	Ref.
2014	Inga Enna Solluthu	"Cute Aana"	
2014	Virattu	"Meeta Paanu"	
2017	Rangoon	"Foreign Return"	
