= Shiv Aroor =

Indian defence anchor and writer

- Born: 25 September 1980 (age 46); Chennai, Tamilnadu, India
- Education: Cardiff University; St. Stephen's College, Delhi; Vidya Mandir Senior Secondary School
- Organization: NDTV

Shiv Aroor is an Indian journalist, writer, and television anchor. He currently serves as the managing editor at NDTV, having previously held the position of senior executive editor at India Today. He is an expert in defence and security affairs, has covered conflicts as a defense correspondent, reporting from regions like Kashmir, Sri Lanka, and Libya. He also runs a defence website called livefistdefence.com, which he founded in 2007 and which was a winner in the 2012 and 2013 DefenceIQ Blogging Awards in the category Regional Defence Blog.

Aroor is a post-graduate in international journalism from Cardiff University in the UK and a graduate from St. Stephen's College, Delhi. He wrote the book, Operation Jinnah, in 2017. In 2018, he co-authored India's Most Fearless and then its sequels in 2019 and 2022, respectively. The 2024 Tamil blockbuster Amaran was based on one of the segments of his book, which is related to Major Mukund Varadarajan.

India's Most Fearless 3, co-authored with Rahul Singh, was released in August 2022. This book was launched by the three service chiefs—Air Chief Marshal VR Chaudhari, Admiral R Hari Kumar, and General Manoj Pande at an event in New Delhi on 17 January 2023. One of the chapters from the book about the Battle of Galwan has been acquired to be made into a film by Apoorva Lakhia.

Aroor is the great-grandson of the Chitrapur Saraswat poet and scholar, Sri Panje Mangesh Rao, who wrote in Konkani and Kannada.

== 2023 opposition boycott ==
On 14 September 2023, the media working group of the opposition Indian National Developmental Inclusive Alliance (INDIA) released a formal list of 14 television news anchors whose shows and debates their party representatives would boycott. Aroor, along with colleagues from India Today, was included on this list. The opposition coalition defended its decision by accusing the selected anchors of functioning as "WhatsApp group of the BJP Media cell" and conducting biased, and "hate-filled" debates including polarizing segments against minorities that distracted from core public issues. The ruling BJP condemned the opposition's boycott.

== Transition to NDTV ==
On February 28, 2025, Shiv Aroor bid farewell to India Today after an 18-year tenure. Following a brief sabbatical, he joined NDTV as managing editor on April 2, 2025.

== Books ==
Author

- Operation Jinnah (2017). Juggernaut. ISBN 9789386228260

Co-Author

- India's Most Fearless: True Stories of Modern Military Heroes (2018), Penguin. Co-authored with Rahul Singh. ISBN 9780143440444
- India's Most Fearless 2: More Military Stories of Unimaginable Courage and Sacrifice (2019), Penguin. Co-authored with Rahul Singh. ISBN 9780143443155
- India's Most Fearless 3: New Military Stories of Unimaginable Courage and Sacrifice (2022), Penguin, Co-authored with Rahul Singh. ISBN 9780143451112
