= Rajkumar Periasamy =

Indian film director

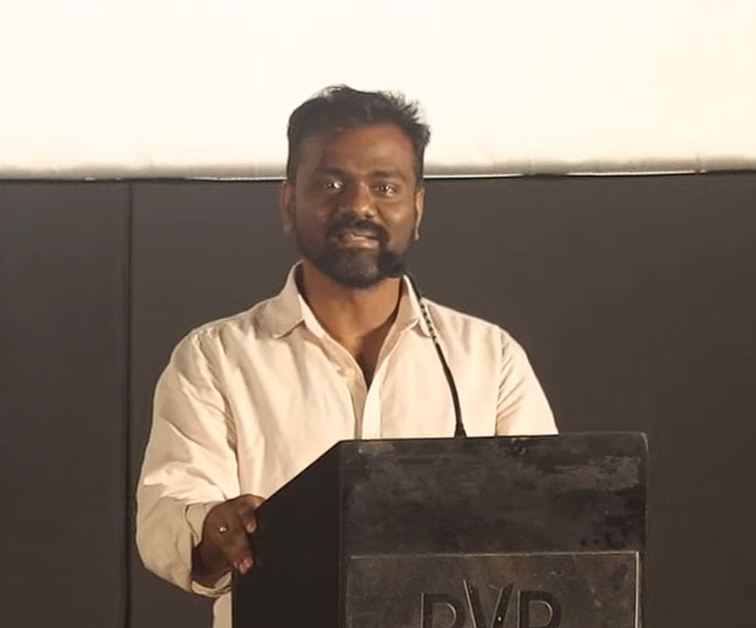
- Born: 22 October 1988 (age 38); Madras, Tamil Nadu, India
- Occupations: Film director, screenwriter
- Years active: 2017–present

Rajkumar Periasamy is an Indian film director known for his work in Tamil cinema. He won the National Film Award for best direction at the 72nd National Film Awards.

== Career ==
Rajkumar made his directorial debut with the film Rangoon (2017), which was produced by AR Murugadoss, after working as an associate director for Thuppakki (2012). In 2024, he wrote and directed Amaran, which was produced by Kamal Haasan under Raaj Kamal Films International. The movie features Sivakarthikeyan in the role of a soldier and is based on the book India’s Most Fearless by Shiv Aroor and Rahul Singh. Rajkumar's inspiration for the story began in 2014, after seeing a video of Major Mukund teaching his young daughter the patriotic song "Achamillai Achamillai" (transl. There is no fear) by Bharatiyar.

Following Amaran, Rajkumar announced his third directorial, Om, the 55th film of Dhanush, to be produced by Dhanush himself under Wunderbar Films, along with RTake Studios.

== Filmography ==
Year	Title	Notes	Ref.
2012	Thuppakki	Assistant Director	
2017	Rangoon		
2024	Amaran		
2026	O.M: Operation Mole		

== Awards ==
Year	Award	Category	Film	Result	Ref.
2025	South Indian International Movie Awards	Best Director – Tamil	Amaran	Won	
2025	Filmfare Awards South	Best Director – Tamil	Amaran	Won	
2026	National Film Awards	Best Direction	Amaran	Won	
