= Rathasaatchi =

2022 action drama film

- Promotional poster
- Directed by: Rafiq Ismail
- Screenplay by: Rafiq Ismail
- Story by: B. Jeyamohan
- Produced by: Anitha Mahendran
- Starring: Kanna Ravi; Elango Kumaravel; Harish Kumar
- Cinematography: Jagadeesh Ravi
- Music by: Javed Riaz
- Production company: Turmeric Media
- Release date: 9 December 2022
- Country: India
- Language: Tamil

Rathasaatchi (transl. Martyr) is a 2022 Indian Tamil-language action drama film directed by Rafiq Ismail and starring Kanna Ravi, Elango Kumaravel, and Harish Kumar. It was released on 9 December 2022 in Aha Tamil.

== Cast ==
- Kanna Ravi as Appu
- Elango Kumaravel as Murugesan
- Kalyan as SP Devasagayam
- Arjun Ram as Lingam
- Charles Vinoth as Narayanan
- Praveen as Perumal
- Vinoth Munna as Karuppaiah
- O. A. K. Sundar as Tamil Nadu Chief Minister
- Harish Kumar as Iqbal
- Monisha as Roslyn
- Harris Moosa as Vijay Rao
- Gopi Kannadasan as SKN
- Rudra as Appu's mother

== Production ==
The film, based on B. Jeyamohan's short story Kathaigal from the novel Venkadal, was shot in 2022.

== Soundtrack ==
The soundtrack was composed by Javed Riaz.

Rathasaatchi

Soundtrack album by Javed Riaz
- Released: 2022
- Language: Tamil
- Label: Think Music; Turmeric Media
- Producer: Javed Riaz

Javed Riaz chronology
| Anbirkiniyal (2021) | Rathasaatchi (2022) | Oh My Ghost (2022) |

Track listing
| No. | Title | Lyrics | Singer(s) | Length |
|---|---|---|---|---|
| 1. | "Yaanaiyodu Modhum" | Vishnu Edavan | Javed Riaz, Aravind Annest | 1:58 |
| 2. | "Kolai Manam" | Karthik Netha | Prasanna Adhisesha |
| 3. | "Kolai Manam" | Vishnu Edavan | Prasanna Adhisesha |

== Reception ==
The film was released on 9 December 2022 on the OTT platform, aha. A reviewer from Times of India noted "Rathasaatchi is definitely worth a watch for the story it tries to tell, but the makers could have concentrated a little more on its screenplay and conflicts to make it more interesting as a movie". A critic from Cinema Express wrote "despite sticking to the hero-rise-and-fall template, good writing choices and terrific performances keep us hooked". OTTPlay noted it was "an intense and hard-hitting drama about a rebellious leader backed by some terrific performances".
