= Amaran (2024 film) =

2024 Indian film by Rajkumar Periasamy

- Theatrical release poster
- Directed by: Rajkumar Periasamy
- Screenplay by: Rajkumar Periasamy
- Based on: India's Most Fearless: True Stories of Modern Military Heroes by: Shiv Aroor; Rahul Singh
- Produced by: Kamal Haasan; R. Mahendran; Vivek Krishnani
- Starring: Sivakarthikeyan; Sai Pallavi
- Narrated by: Sai Pallavi
- Cinematography: CH Sai
- Edited by: R. Kalaivanan
- Music by: G. V. Prakash Kumar
- Production companies: Raaj Kamal Films International; Turmeric Media; Sony Pictures International Productions
- Distributed by: see below
- Release date: 31 October 2024
- Running time: 169 minutes
- Country: India
- Language: Tamil
- Budget: ₹120 crore
- Box office: est. ₹320–335 crore (Note: Amaran's reported worldwide grosses vary between ₹320 crore (India Today, Hindustan Times, Mint, and News18) – ₹335 crore (The Hans India))

Amaran (transl. The Immortal) is a 2024 Indian Tamil language biographical action war film written and directed by Rajkumar Periasamy and produced by Raaj Kamal Films International, together with Turmeric Media and Sony Pictures Films India. The film stars Sivakarthikeyan as Major Mukund Varadarajan and Sai Pallavi as Mukund's wife Indhu Rebecca Varghese. It is an adaptation of the book India's Most Fearless: True Stories of Modern Military Heroes by Shiv Aroor and Rahul Singh, which consists of a chapter on Mukund. The film follows Indhu, who is on her way to receive the Ashoka Chakra award on behalf of her late husband, remembering his life and career.

The film was officially announced in January 2022 under the tentative title Sivakarthikeyan 21, as it was Sivakarthikeyan's 21st film as a lead actor. The official title was announced in February 2024. Principal photography commenced in May 2023 with the first schedule at Jammu and Kashmir, which continued for 75 days over the next three months. The subsequent portions of the movie were shot in Chennai and Pondicherry, and the shooting was wrapped after a year in May 2024. The music for the film was composed by G. V. Prakash Kumar, cinematography was handled by CH Sai and editing was done by R. Kalaivanan.

The film was released in theatres worldwide on 31 October 2024 coinciding with Diwali and received widespread acclaim from critics, who praised the cast performances, direction, screenplay, production values and G.V. Prakash's music. It set several box office records, emerging as the second highest-grossing Tamil film of 2024, seventh highest-grossing Indian film of 2024, eight highest-grossing Tamil film of all time and the fourth highest-grossing film in Tamil Nadu. Amaran achieved the highest online tickets ever sold for a Tamil film in the year 2024.

The film won 3 awards at the 72nd National Film Awards, including Rajkumar Periasamy as Best Director, GV Prakash as Best Music Director and R Kalaivannan as Best Editor

== Plot ==
Indhu Rebecca Varghese, the widow of Major Mukund Varadarajan, travels by plane to New Delhi to receive the Ashoka Chakra award on behalf of her husband. During the journey, she reminisces about her life with Mukund, and Mukund's military career.

A young Mukund is deeply influenced by the Indian Armed Forces. During his college years in Chennai, he meets Indhu, and their connection grows gradually. They eventually love each other despite Indhu's initial reservations about Mukund's aspiration to become a soldier, and the religious differences between their families. After finishing college, Mukund enlists in the Indian Army, and is trained at the Officers Training Academy in Chennai. He is commissioned as a lieutenant in the Rajput Regiment. Despite their geographical separation and Indhu's family's reluctance to marry her off to a soldier, they eventually get married. Soon after, they get pregnant and have a daughter.

The narrative shifts to Mukund's posting as a major to the Rashtriya Rifles in Jammu and Kashmir, where the Indian army is engaged against Insurgency in Jammu and Kashmir. Mukund fights his emotions and the desire to return to his wife and young daughter. He establishes a bond with the locals, tries to bridge the divide between the military and the civilians, and gains access to information on militants from the social circles. Mukund's convoy is attacked by militants led by Altaf Baba. While several Indian army men are hurt in the attack, Mukund kills Baba with the help of his army colleague Sepoy Vikram Singh. With his command and bravery, he earns a respect among his fellow soldiers, and his commanding officer Colonel Amit Singh Dabas.

The second part of the story revolves around a counter militancy operation at Qazipathri village in Shopian district. Mukund leads a team of soldiers, who are tasked with neutralizing a group of armed terrorists hiding in a safe house, amongst civilians. Mukund commands his men to ensure the safety of civilians. With the approaching darkness, Mukund paired with Vikram, enter the safe house, and engage in gun fire with the militants. All the three militants are killed in the operation, in which Mukund sustains bullet injuries. Despite attempts to transport him to a medical center, he succumbs to his injuries. His death leaves the regiment and his commanding officer devastated, while they salute him.

The film ends with Mukund's distraught family performing his last rites, and Indhu later receiving the Ashoka Chakra award from the President of India. Fighting her tears, she finds strength in knowing Mukund lived and died as a true soldier. Actual footage from the life of Mukund and his family is shown during the credits.

== Cast ==
- Sivakarthikeyan as Major Mukund Varadarajan
- Sai Pallavi as Indhu Rebecca Varghese, Mukund's wife
- Rahul Bose as Colonel Amit Singh Dabas, Mukund's Commanding officer
- Bhuvan Arora as Sepoy Vikram Singh
- Haethakshi V. as Arsheya Mukund, Mukund and Indhu's daughter
- Lallu as Sepoy Ravi Shankar, Second-In-Charge officer of Mukund's team
- Anbu Thasan as a sepoy who tracked the location of Altaf Baba
- Shreekumar as Sepoy Michael
- Shyamaprasad as George Varghese, Indhu's father
- Shyam Mohan as Deepak Varghese, Indhu's elder brother
- Paul T. Baby as Andrews Varghese, Indhu's second brother
- Geetha Kailasam as Geetha Varadarajan, Mukund's mother
- Raju Rajappan as Varadarajan, Mukund's father
- Shyla Das as Mrs. Varghese, Indhu's mother
- Umair Lateef as Sepoy Waheed Ahamed
- Sugamya Sankar as Nithya, Mukund's elder sister
- Navya Sujji as Swetha, Mukund's second sister
- Shyrush Zutshi as Altaf Baba (voiceover by Harish Uthaman)
- Rohman Shawl as Asif Wani (voiceover by Gautham Ram Karthik)
- Mir Salman as Sepoy Saifudeen
- Ajaey Naga Raaman as Sepoy Rajesh Shukla
- Gaurav Venkatesh as Sepoy Venkanna
- Prayas Mann as Sepoy Joginder
- Abhinav Raj as Major Srinath
- John Kaipallil as Major Mithun Mohan
- Rohan Surya Kanuma Reddy as Sepoy Narasimha Rao
- Vaibhav Murugesan as Mukund's friend
- Hanan Baba as Abbas Nangroo
- Vikas Bangar as Sepoy Jyoti Sharma
- Vijay Karthik as Nithya's husband
- Surya as Swetha's husband

== Production ==
=== Development ===
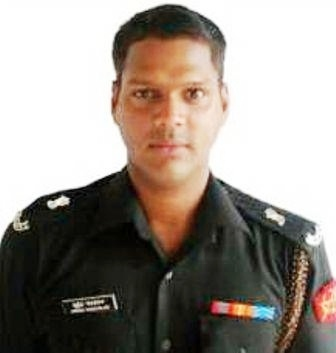
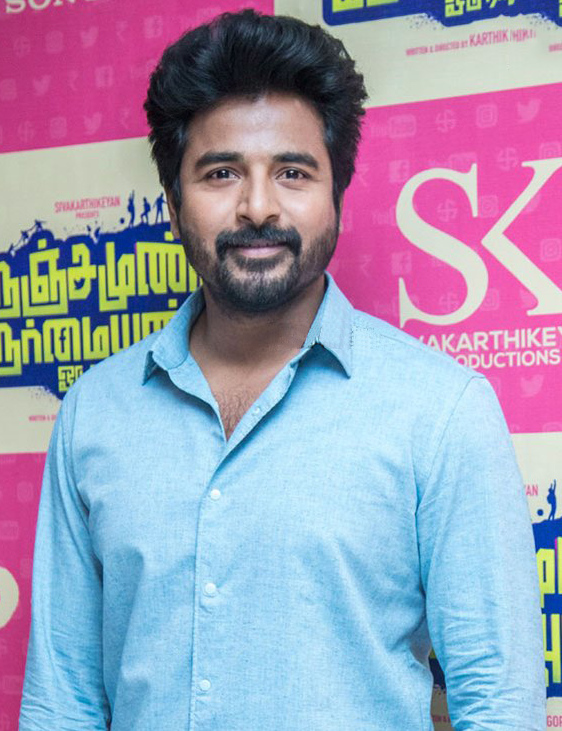
Amaran is a biography of Major Mukund Varadarajan (left), who is portrayed by Sivakarthikeyan in the film.

After the release of Rangoon in 2017, Rajkumar Periyasamy began working on a new project, which was set to be his second directorial. It was set to be produced by Kamal Haasan, in his second collaboration with the director after the latter previously worked on a reality show hosted by Haasan. Vakil Khan suggested Rajkumar to make a biographical film about Major Mukund Varadarajan, based on the book India's Most Fearless by Shiv Aroor and Rahul Singh, which included a chapter about Mukund. Khan said that he would secure the filming rights of the book from Sony Pictures, which later gave the rights and funded the venture. Haasan agreed to Rajkumar's request and agreed to jointly fund the film with Sony Pictures.

Previously, Sivakarthikeyan had collaborated with Rajkumar before they both entered in the film industry, where they had worked for private Tamil television channels on several projects and shows. In January 2022, during the finale of Bigg Boss: season 5, Haasan announced the project without revealing any information on the story line. On 15 January, the actor's production company, Raaj Kamal Films International, along with Sony Pictures, made a public announcement on making of the film, tentatively titled #Sivakarthikeyan21 (actor's 21st film) and Production #51 (51st production for Raaj Kamal Films). The film's official title Amaran was revealed on 16 February 2024, on the eve of Sivakarthikeyan's birthday after Rajkumar gained permission from the makers of the 1992 film of the same name.

=== Pre-production ===
In an interview with Ananda Vikatan, Rajkumar stated that he visited Mukund's family to gather information about the latter's life earlier that helped him write the screenplay for the film. A muhurat puja was held on 5 May 2023 at the headquarters of Raaj Kamal Films in Chennai with the film's cast and crew along with Mukund's family. However, the participation of Mukund's family was not made public so as to not reveal the film being a biopic about Mukund. G. V. Prakash Kumar was chosen to score the background music for the film, in his first collaboration with Periyasamy. Production designer Rajeevan, cinematographer CH Sai, editor R. Kalaivanan, stunt choreographers Anbariv, dance choreographer Sherif, costume designers Amritha Ram, Sameera Saneesh and V. Sai joined the film as a part of the technical crew.

=== Casting ===
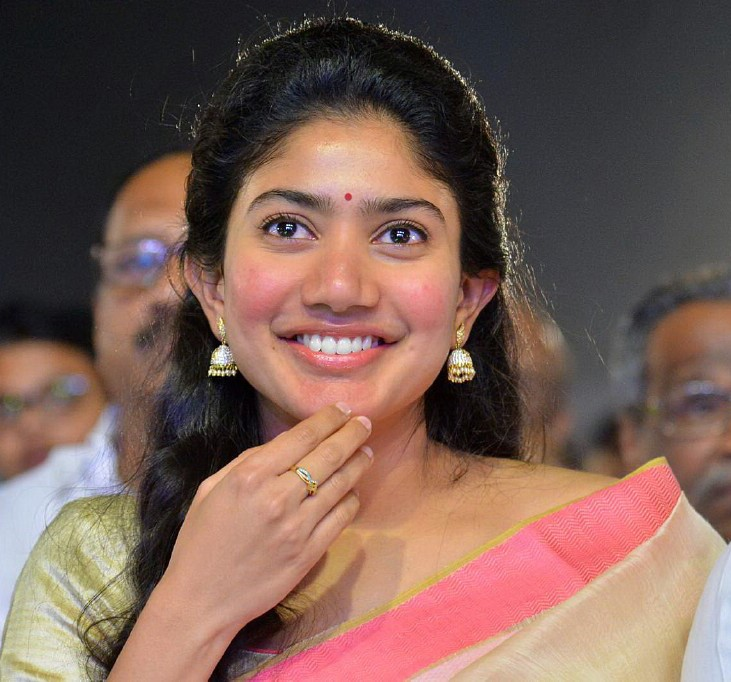
Sai Pallavi was cast as the lead actress, portraying the role of Mukund's wife Indu

Initially, Rajkumar and Haasan scouted for a debutant to portray the role of Mukund. Based on the suggestion of Mahendran, co-head of Raaj Kamal Films, Sivakarthikeyan was roped to portray the role in the film. Sivakarthikeyan underwent a training regimen for almost a year during the pre-production process for the role. He also covered his head with a beanie in public, so as to not reveal his hairstyle until the film's first look poster was released. Rajkumar stated that the actor also went through a workshop at Mumbai to change his body-language from a soft-spoken to an army officer. Sai Pallavi was paired opposite Sivakarthikeyan, in her first pairing with the actor. She played the role of Mukund's wife Indhu, and received a remuneration of ₹30 million (US$320,000). Bollywood actor Bhuvan Arora was revealed to portray the role of sepoy Vikram Singh, in his debut Tamil film. He stated that he dedicated the role to his father, who served in the army. Later, Rahul Bose, Ajaey Naga Raaman, Mir Salman, and Gaurav Venkatesh were also confirmed to be part of the cast.

=== Filming and post-production ===
Principal photography began with the first schedule on 5 May 2023 at Srinagar in Jammu and Kashmir. The filming was halted for security reason during the 2023 G20 New Delhi summit, before resuming by 22 May. Sivakarthikeyan returned to Chennai in late May after finishing the first part of the schedule. After a short break, filming resumed on 7 June, before being paused briefly from 15 July. The filming of the first schedule concluded on 27 August, and had lasted for 75 working days. The second schedule began on 21 October at a film city in Chennai, for filming a song sequence featuring Sivakarthikeyan and Sai Pallavi. On 9 November, the film shooting moved to Puducherry. Sivakarthikeyan sported a clean-shaven look in mid-December, for filming Mukund's younger portions. In an interview with Ananda Vikatan in February 2024, Rajkumar stated that only minor portions of film were yet to be completed. The unit started the final schedule on 26 April 2024, and shot the climax scenes involving Sivakarthikeyan and Bhuvan. The filming was wrapped by 25 May 2024. The visual effects for the film were handled by Unifi Media.

== Music ==
The soundtrack for the film was composed by G. V. Prakash Kumar, his first collaboration with Rajkumar and Sivakarthikeyan. The audio rights were acquired by Saregama. In February 2024, Rajkumar revealed that there would be some songs with fast-paced dance movements in the film. In mid-June, Prakash revealed the musical works of the film were almost completed. The first song "Hey Minnale" was released on 4 October. The second song "Vennilavu Saaral" was released on 17 October. The audio launch for the film was held on 18 October 2024 at Sri Sai Ram Engineering College in Chennai. The third single "Uyirey" was released on 30 October 2024, whilst the fourth song "Vaane Vaane" and fifth song "Amara" were released on 9 and 11 November 2024 respectively.

== Release ==
=== Theatrical ===
The film received a U/A certification by the Central Board of Film Certification after recommended modifications to gory images, muting language and modifying a wrong map shown during the film were made. Initially, the film was reportedly scheduled to release on 15 August, coinciding with Independence Day. It was later postponed to 27 September, and the date was subsequently revised to 31 October. A special screening was held on 24 October 2024 at New Delhi for the army officials and their family members.

The film was released in theatres worldwide on 31 October 2024, coinciding with Diwali, along with Brother and Bloody Beggar. Apart from Tamil, it was dubbed and released in the Telugu, Hindi, Malayalam and Kannada languages. In the United Kingdom, the British Board of Film Classification (BBFC) classified the film as above 15 for its depiction strong violences, injury details and language, and suggested 20 seconds of cuts.

=== Distribution ===
Red Giant Movies acquired the distribution rights for Tamil Nadu while Pen Marudhar Entertainment bought the rights to distribute the Hindi version along with the North Indian release of the Tamil version. Sreshth Movies brought the distribution rights of the film for Andhra Pradesh and Telangana for ₹50 million (US$530,000). Home Screen Entertainment bought the overseas distribution rights of the film.

=== Home media ===
The digital streaming rights were acquired by Netflix. Initially, the film was reported to be available for streaming in November, which was later postponed to early December. The film began streaming on Netflix from 5 December 2024 in Tamil and other dubbed languages of Telugu, Malayalam, Kannada and Hindi.

== Reception ==
=== Critical response ===
Amaran received widespread acclaim from critics, who praised the cast performances, direction, screenplay, production values and G.V. Prakash's music.

Mukund's Commanding officer, Amit Dabbas, expressed his gratitude to the film crew and requested the viewers to appreciate the strength of the people who serve the country. Jagadish Angadi of Deccan Herald gave 4/5 stars and wrote "Sharp editing, gripping pace, engaging narrative and impressive production design make this soul-stirring military drama a perfect family watch." Kirubhakar Purushothaman of News18 gave 4/5 stars and wrote "Rajkumar Periasamy needs a huge salute for making a subtle but incredibly touching ode to a soldier. [...] Amaran doesn't rely on easy gimmicks; instead, it builds genuine heroic moments, with Sivakarthikeyan delivering a restrained yet powerful performance." Avinash Ramachandran of The Indian Express gave 3.5/5 stars and wrote "With wonderful performances by Sivakarthikeyan and Sai Pallavi, Amaran is a poignant yet powerful tale about Major Mukund Varadarajan's love for India, and his wife Indhu."

Roopa Radhakrishnan of The Times of India gave 3.5/5 stars and wrote "Amaran is a worthy tribute to the legacy of Major Mukund Varadarajan. Even with all the glitches in between, the film makes us cherish and celebrate Mukund and the courageous officer he was." Janani K of India Today gave 3.5/5 stars and wrote "Amaran is a beautiful, emotional and intriguing ode to Major Mukund Varadarajan and army men like him. Watch out for the emotional sequences throughout the film." Kusumika Das of Times Now gave 3/5 stars and wrote, "Rajkumar Periasamy's direction, combined with strong performances by Sivakarthikeyan and Sai Pallavi, make Amaran a must-watch for those interested in stories of patriotism, love, and sacrifice."

Gopinath Rajendran of The Hindu wrote "A pacy screenplay, marvellous performances and excellent technical prowess make Amaran a brilliant ode to the resilient families who love their bravehearts." Goutham S of Pinkvilla wrote "Amaran is truly an immortal tale of a soldier whose legacy will pass on as an inspiration for many leaders and soldiers. With strong performances and characterizations, this biographical war film is worth a watch on the big screens." Latha Srinivasan of The Hindustan Times wrote "Amaran is a wonderful tribute to those serving in the army and their families and is a stark reminder that our freedom exists because of their sacrifices. One walks away from Amaran with a heavy heart for those who lost loved ones on the battlefield and yet, happy that their legacy will never go unknown and be immortalized on the silver screen thanks to directors like Rajkumar." Arjun Menon from Rediff rated the film 3 out of 5, stating that while the film captured glimpses of Mukund's emotional journey, it fell short due to clichéd storytelling and inconsistent tone.

=== Box office ===
Amaran grossed ₹35 crore (US$3.7 million) worldwide on its opening day, which was the fourth highest first day gross for a Tamil film of 2024 and the highest of Sivakarthikeyan. The film surpassed Raayan to become the third biggest opening for a Tamil film in 2024, behind The Greatest of All Time and Vettaiyan. The film crossed ₹100 crore (US$11 million) in three days, earning over ₹48.25 crore (US$5.2 million) from Tamil Nadu becoming the fastest film of Sivakarthikeyan to reach the ₹100 crore mark.

It grossed an estimated ₹135 crore (US$14 million) worldwide from its opening weekend of four days, becoming the highest opening weekend gross for the actor. It also became the highest-grossing film of Sivakarthikeyan, beating Don (2022). The film crossed the ₹100 crore (US$11 million) mark in India on its sixth day of release, and the $1 million mark in North America on its fifth day, becoming the first film of the actor to do both. On its tenth day of release, it crossed the ₹100 crore (US$11 million) mark in Tamil Nadu, beating Vettaiyan, and the ₹200 crore (US$21 million) crore mark worldwide, becoming the first film of Sivakarthikeyan to do so. It concluded its run with a worldwide gross estimated to be around 300–335 crore.

== Festival screenings ==
Festival	Section	Screening Dates	Notes	Ref
BIFFeS	Indian Cinema Competition	March 1–8, 2025	—	
CIFF	—	December 12–19, 2024	For awards won, see awards section	
Indian Film Festival of Alberta (IFFA)	Special Screening	September 7, 2025	Closing film	
Indian Film Festival South Africa (IFFSA)	Cinema	March 9, 2025	Organised by High Commission of India, Pretoria, and the Consulate General of India, Johannesburg	
IFFI	Indian Panorama	November 20–28, 2025	For awards won, see awards section	

== Awards and nominations ==
Name of the award ceremony, year presented, award category, nominee(s) of the award, and the result of the nomination
Year	Award	Ceremony	Category	Recipient	Result	Ref.
2024	CIFF		Best Actor (Female)	Sai Pallavi	Won	
2024	CIFF		Best Cinematographer	CH Sai	Won	
2024	CIFF		Best Feature Film	"Amaran"	Won	
2025	IFFI	56th International Film Festival of India	International Competition - Best Feature Film	"Amaran"	Nominated	
2025	KFCA Awards	Kerala Film Critics Association Awards 2024	Best Other Language Movie	"Amaran"	Won	
2025	SIIMA	13th South Indian International Movie Awards	Best Film - Tamil	"Amaran"	Won	
2025	SIIMA	13th South Indian International Movie Awards	Best Actor (Female) - Tamil	Sai Pallavi	Won	
2025	SIIMA	13th South Indian International Movie Awards	Best Actor (Male) - Tamil	Sivakarthikeyan	Won	
2025	SIIMA	13th South Indian International Movie Awards	Best Director - Tamil	Rajkumar Periasamy	Won	
2025	SIIMA	13th South Indian International Movie Awards	Best Cinematographer - Tamil	CH Sai	Won	
2025	World Culture Film Festival		International Film Awards	"Amaran"	Nominated	
2026	National Film Awards	72nd National Film Awards	Best Direction	Rajkumar Periasamy	Won	
2026	National Film Awards	72nd National Film Awards	Best Editing	R. Kalaivannan	Won	
2026	National Film Awards	72nd National Film Awards	Best Music Direction (Background Music)	G. V. Prakash Kumar	Won	

== Controversies ==
Members of a fringe political outfit, Tamilaga Makkal Jananayaga Katchi, protested in several cities across Tamil Nadu on 21 February 2024, alleging that the promotional teaser of the film portrayed Muslims in a "bad light", and demanded a stall on the film's release. A section of people criticised the film makers for not revealing Mukund's caste as Brahmin in the film. Rajkumar later stated that it was not shown deliberately as per the request of Mukund's parents.

In the film, a sequence featured a mobile number that belonged to a student named Vaaseegan. Receiving many calls from the film's viewers, he flagged the issue to the makers of the film and the service provider Airtel India. Later, Vaaseegan sent a legal notice to the makers, demanding ₹1.1 crore (US$120,000) in compensation. The makers of the film later apologised to him and masked the mobile number in the film. Kamal Haasan's decision to not invite media to the 100 day success meet was met with criticism from some netizens, who alleged that the media played an important role in the film's promotion and success.
