= Veduvan =

- Official release poster
- Genre: Crime thriller
- Written by: Pavan
- Screenplay by: Pavan
- Directed by: Pavan
- Starring: Kanna Ravi; Sanjeev Venkat; Sravnitha Srikanth; Vinusha Devi; Rekha Nair; Lavanya
- Music by: Vibin Baskar
- Country of origin: India
- Original language: Tamil
- No. of seasons: 1

Production
- Producer: Sagar Pentela
- Cinematography: Srinivaasan Devaraj
- Editor: S. Surajkavee
- Production company: Rise East

Original release
- Network: ZEE5
- Release: October 10, 2025

Veduvan is an Indian Tamil-language action thriller streaming web series directed by Pavan and produced by Srinidhi Sagar under the banner of Rise East. The series stars Kanna Ravi in a lead role, with Sanjeev Venkat, Sravnitha Srikanth, Vinusha Devi, Rekha Nair, and Lavanya in supporting roles. It premiered on ZEE5 on 10 October 2025. Set in a coastal town, Veduvan follows a chain of events triggered by a mysterious incident that unearths old grievances and buried secrets.

== Premise ==
The story follows Sooraj, an aspiring actor who secures the role of Arun, an encounter specialist, in a film. As he immerses himself in the character, Sooraj begins to understand the moral dilemmas and hidden truths that define the role. The lines between his reel and real lives begin to blur, drawing him into a tense web of love, betrayal, and corruption. The series examines how an actor's pursuit of authenticity leads him to confront questions that go beyond the story he set out to tell.

== Cast and characters ==
- Kanna Ravi as Sooraj
- Sanjeev Venkat
- Sravnitha Srikanth
- Vinusha Devi
- Rekha Nair
- Lavanya

== episodes ==
No.	Title	Directed by	Original release date
1	"The Role of a Lifetime"	Pavan Kumar	10 October 2025
A washed-up actor, Sooraj, finds hope in a daring new script about encounter specialist Arun and becomes drawn into the cop’s violent past after Arun kills gangster Guna.
2	"The Man in the Shadows"	Pavan Kumar	10 October 2025
Guna’s public execution shocks Chennai. His widow, Yashoda, vows revenge while the police brand the killing self-defence, and Arun struggles to keep his identity secret.
3	"The Calm Before the Storm"	Pavan Kumar	10 October 2025
Continuing his undercover mission in Sivagangai, Arun targets feared gangster Aadhi at a hotel, even as Yashoda intensifies her hunt for her husband’s killer.
4	"The Predator"	Pavan Kumar	10 October 2025
Arun discovers that Aadhi has married his former love, Shanthi. Suspecting Arun’s motives, Aadhi warns him to leave; Arun instead makes a bold, risky move.
5	"The Kill"	Pavan Kumar	10 October 2025
During a village-festival fireworks display, Arun secretly shoots Aadhi. At the funeral he comforts a grief-stricken Shanthi and her children while hiding his guilt.
6	"The Weight of the Bullet"	Pavan Kumar	10 October 2025
Though feted as a hero, Arun is rattled by Aadhi’s death. Back in Chennai he questions the justice system and faces a life-altering decision.
7	"The Truth, As We Know It"	Pavan Kumar	10 October 2025
While portraying Arun on film, Sooraj uncovers disturbing facts about the officer’s demise. The movie is a hit, but Sooraj is haunted by the truth he has learned.

== Production ==
Veduvan is directed by Pavan and produced by Srinidhi Sagar of Rise East. The technical crew includes Vipin Bhaskar as composer, Srinivaasan Devaraj as cinematographer, and S. Surajkavee as editor.

Filming took place in and around Sivagangai, with several scenes shot in suburban and rural settings such as local villages and bus stations. The production was completed within an 18-day schedule. Actor Kanna Ravi described the experience as one of the most demanding projects of his career due to the tight filming timeline and the psychological depth of his role.

== Release ==
The official trailer for Veduvan was released on 27 September 2025. The series premiered on ZEE5 on 10 October 2025.

== Reception ==
The Scroll.in review commended Kanna Ravi's performance but observed that the show's moral commentary was tentative and the narrative lacked urgency. Anusha Sundar of OTTPlay rated the series 2 out of 5 stars, writing that "Veduvan, which dances with concepts of morality and responsibility, ends up dilly-dallying with overly simplistic choices of writing. Even as the cast puts up a decent show, the efforts that have gone on paper are starkly visible and somewhat disjointed." Jonson of Puthiya Thalaimurai rated the series 1 out of 5 stars, stating that "the only consolation of this series is that it is spread over seven episodes and runs for a total of two hours. Overall, if they had added new and interesting things, this Veduvan would have kept me interested." Cinema Inbox wrote that "being an actor, Kanna Ravi has got the opportunity to play various roles in this series. Kanna Ravi, who perfectly carries himself in all the varied characters including a police officer, beggar, and cook, delivers an impressive performance."
