= Alamat ng 7 kilabot =

1967 action film by Armando A. Herrera

- Directed by: Armando A. Herrera
- Written by: Teodorico C. Santos; Fred Navarro
- Based on: Seven Samurai by Akira Kurosawa
- Produced by: Fernando Poe Jr.
- Starring: Fernando Poe Jr.; Joseph Estrada; Jess Lapid; Bob Soler; Zaldy Zshornack; Dan Moreno; Robert Talabis; Van De Leon; Eddie Garcia; Johnny Monteiro; Ramon d'Salva; Lito Anzures; Victor Bravo; Bert Olivar; Paquito Diaz; Manolo Robles; Dencio Padilla; Rebecca; Romy Diaz; Andy Poe
- Music by: Tony Maiquez
- Production company: FPJ Productions
- Release date: 13 September 1967
- Running time: 120 minutes
- Country: Philippines
- Language: Filipino

Alamat ng 7 kilabot (Legend of the Seven Monsters) is a 1967 Filipino action film starring Fernando Poe Jr., Joseph Estrada, Jess Lapid, Bob Soler and Zaldy Zshornack. Set in the fictional town of San Diego, it follows seven treasure hunters battling a team of bandits to retake a town whose population has mistaken them for military forces, in a loose remake of the 1954 Akira Kurosawa film Seven Samurai.

== Production ==
The film was directed by Armando A. Herrera from a screenplay by Teodorico C. Santos and Fred Navarro, and was produced by Fernando Poe Jr. through his company FPJ Productions. It was released in 1967.

The film was the debut of Andy Poe, Fernando’s brother.

== Reception ==
Jio de Leon wrote that the film was "an all-star Expendables-type film before Stallone even made that a thing. It's a Filipino version of a Western, where seven cowboy-type dudes work together to find a treasure" admitting that "it tread[ed] the same water as Akira Kurosawa's Seven Samurai or more specifically The Magnificent Seven (a remake of the Kurosawa film in itself)."

== See also ==
- Remakes of films by Akira Kurosawa
