= Mukund Varadarajan =

Indian Army Ashok Chakra recipient (1983–2014)

Major Mukund Varadarajan AC
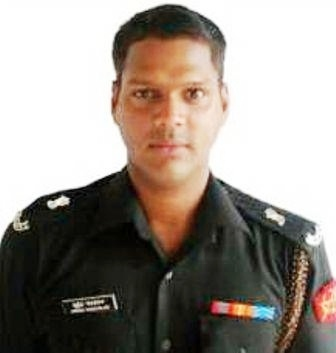
- Born: 12 April 1983; Kozhikode district, Kerala, India
- Died: 25 April 2014 (aged 31); Shopian district, Jammu and Kashmir, India
- Burial place: Cremated in Chennai
- Education: Sri Chandrasekharendra Saraswathi Viswa Mahavidyalaya (BCom); Madras Christian College (DJMC); Officers Training Academy
- Spouse: Indhu Rebecca Varghese
- Children: 1
- Military career
- Allegiance: India
- Branch: Indian Army
- Service years: 2006–2014
- Rank: Major
- Units: 22 Rajput Regiment; 44 Rashtriya Rifles
- Conflicts: United Nations Lebanon Mission; Insurgency in Jammu and Kashmir †
- Awards: Ashoka Chakra

Mukund Varadarajan, AC (Tamil pronunciation: [mukund̪ vaɾad̪aɾaːdʑan]; 12 April 1983 – 25 April 2014) was a commissioned officer in the Indian Army's Rajput Regiment. He was killed in action during a counter-terrorism operation while on deputation to the 44th Rashtriya Rifles battalion in Jammu and Kashmir. He was posthumously awarded the Ashoka Chakra, India's highest peacetime decoration, for his actions.

Born in 1983 in a Tamil family in the Kozhikode district, Mukund completed his college education in 2004 before joining the Officers Training Academy in Chennai. He was commissioned as a lieutenant in the Indian army in 2006. He served at the infantry school in Mhow and was part of a United Nations mission in Lebanon. He was promoted to the rank of captain in 2011. He became a major in 2012 and was deputed to the 44th Battalion of the Rashtriya Rifles.

In June 2013, Mukund killed Altaf Baba, then commander of Jaish-e-Mohammed in South Kashmir, when a group of terrorists attacked Mukund's army convoy. On 25 April 2014, Mukund led his team to Qazipathri in Southern Kashmir, to engage with Altaf Wani, who had replaced Altaf Baba as the local commander of the terrorists in the region. Wani and two terrorists had killed electoral officers during the 2014 Indian general election. Mukund and sepoy Vikram Singh killed all the three terrorists in the ensuing gunfight. However, both the army men were also killed in the battle.

On 1 June 2015, a statue of Mukund was unveiled at the premises of the Officers Training Academy in Chennai. In 2024, a Tamil biographical film Amaran, which was based on his life, was released.

== Early and personal life ==
Mukund Varadarajan was born on 12 April 1983 in a Tamil Iyengar family to R. Varadarajan and Geetha Varadarajan in Kozhikode district, Kerala, India. His family hailed from Paruthipattu in Avadi near Chennai. He was the youngest of the three siblings. His father worked in a public sector bank in Kerala, and the family shifted to Tambaram in Chennai during Mukund's childhood. Mukund received his Bachelor of Commerce from Sri Chandrasekharendra Saraswathi Viswa Mahavidyalaya at Kanchipuram and a diploma in journalism from the Madras Christian College.

Mukund worked at a Business Process Outsourcing center for sometime before he decided to join the Indian Armed Forces. He married Indhu Rebecca Varghese in 2009, and the couple have a daughter.

== Military career ==
=== Early career ===
Mukund joined the Officers Training Academy in Chennai in 2004. After graduating, he was commissioned as a lieutenant in the 22 Rajput Regiment of the Indian army on 18 March 2006. He served at the Infantry school in Mhow, Madhya Pradesh and was part of a United Nations Mission in Lebanon. He received permanent commission back in the Indian army effective 18 March 2011. He was promoted to the rank of captain on 28 July 2011. He was later promoted to major on 18 October 2012, and was deputed to the 44th Battalion of the Rashtriya Rifles in Shopian district of Jammu and Kashmir in December 2012.

In June 2013, Mukund's convoy was attacked by armed terrorists near an apple orchard in Shopian district. The group was led by Altaf Baba, the South Kashmir commander of Jaish-e-Mohammed, a Pakistan-based Islamic terrorist organization. While several Indian army men were hurt in the attack, Mukund killed Baba with the help of his army colleague Sepoy Vikram Singh. As per Mukund's commanding officer Amit Singh Dabas, Mukund worked with the electronic warfare unit at Srinagar on cracking the communication codes used by the terrorists. Based on the cracked codes, the Indian army found a safe house in Qazipathri village, which was used by the terrorists while transiting between Shopian and Yarwan forests.

=== Qazipathri operation ===
On 25 April 2014, at around 14:30 IST, Indian army intelligence reports indicated the presence of three armed men in the safe house at Qazipathri in Southern Kashmir. One of them was Altaf Wani, who had replaced Altaf Baba as the local commander of the terrorists in the region. The other two belonged to Lashkar-e-Taiba, another Pakistan-based Islamic militant organization. The terrorists had earlier attacked the electoral officers during the polling for the 2014 Indian general election, and killed one of the officers. The safe house compound consisted of a two storey brick house and two outhouses, surrounded by an orchard. Mukund led his team for a cordon and search operation, and reached the location at 15:00 hrs. The twelve member team was split into six pairs of two men each and were assigned specific roles. Mukund was paired with sepoy Vikram Singh. The army team initially evacuated the civilians from the area.

At about 17:00 hrs, Mukund's team came under heavy gunfire from the terrorists holed inside the house. At 17:30 hrs, Mukund lobbed an improvised explosive device into the terrorists' hiding, and one of the terrorists was killed in the return gunfire by the armed soldiers. The other two terrorists which included Wani, returned fire, which injured Mukund in his forearm. They moved to one of the outhouses in the compound, before one of them was killed using a grenade by Mukund. Wani hid behind a stack of wooden logs, and returned fire, which killed Vikram Singh. Mukund and Wani engaged in a firefight, which resulted in both the men being shot. Wani was killed and the bodies of the three dead men were recovered later from the site.

=== Ranks ===
Symbol	Rank	Service	Rank dates
	Lieutenant	Indian Army	18 March 2006
	Captain	Indian Army	28 July 2011
	Major	Indian Army	18 October 2012

== Death and aftermath ==
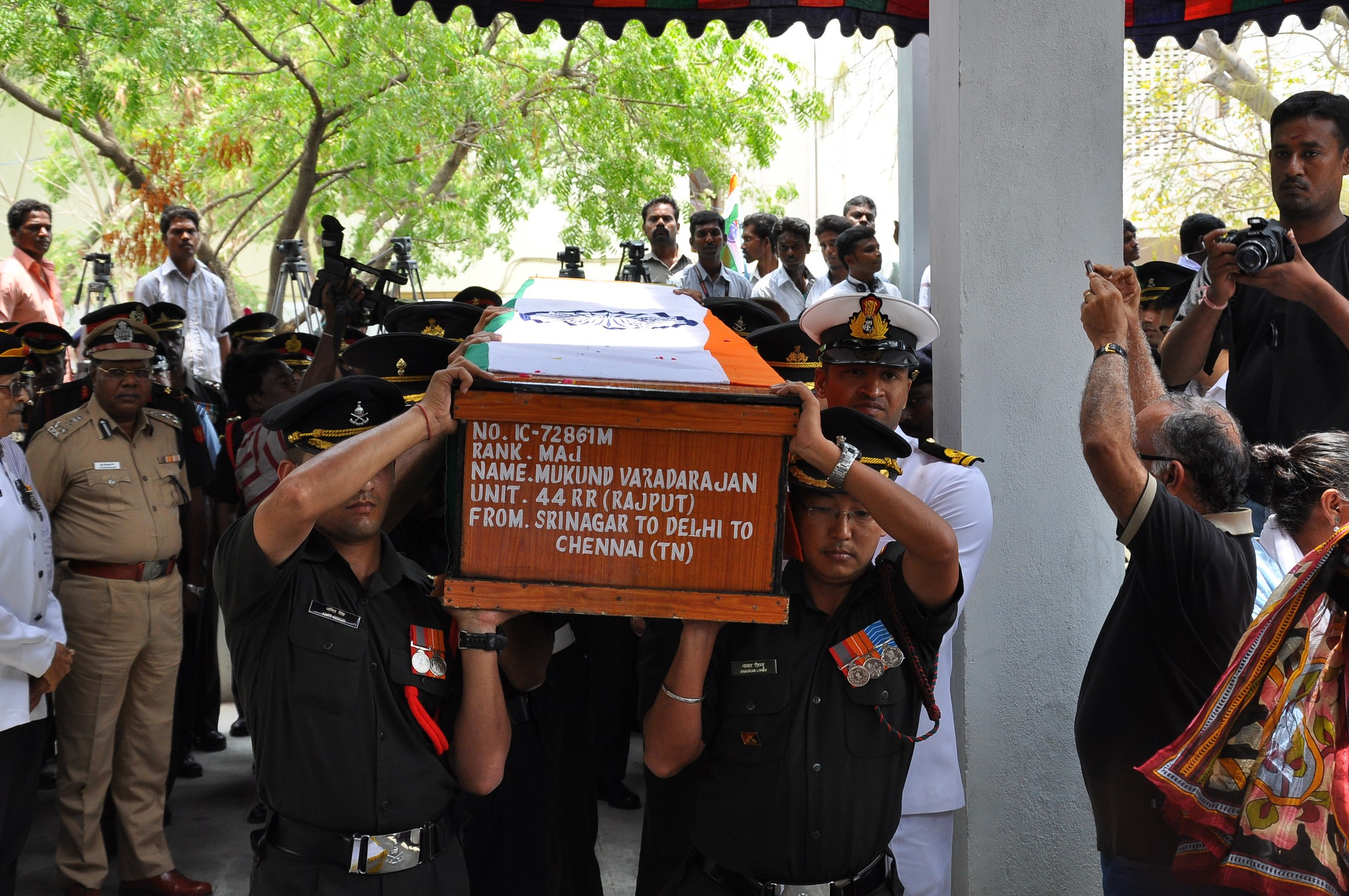
Mukund's body carried in a casket

Mukund had sustained three bullet injuries during the Qazipatri operation, and was bleeding profusely. He told one of his team members that he and Vikram managed to kill Wani, but Vikram was killed in the process. He also remarked that, "And I got hit too. I can't believe it." As per Dabas' instructions, Mukund was to be moved to the government hospital in Pulwama for initial treatment, and was to be moved to Srinagar later for further treatment. However, Mukund succumbed to his injuries en route to the hospital. His body was moved to Chennai on 27 April, and was kept at the Officers Training Academy for public viewing. His body was cremated with full state honours on 28 April.

== Legacy ==
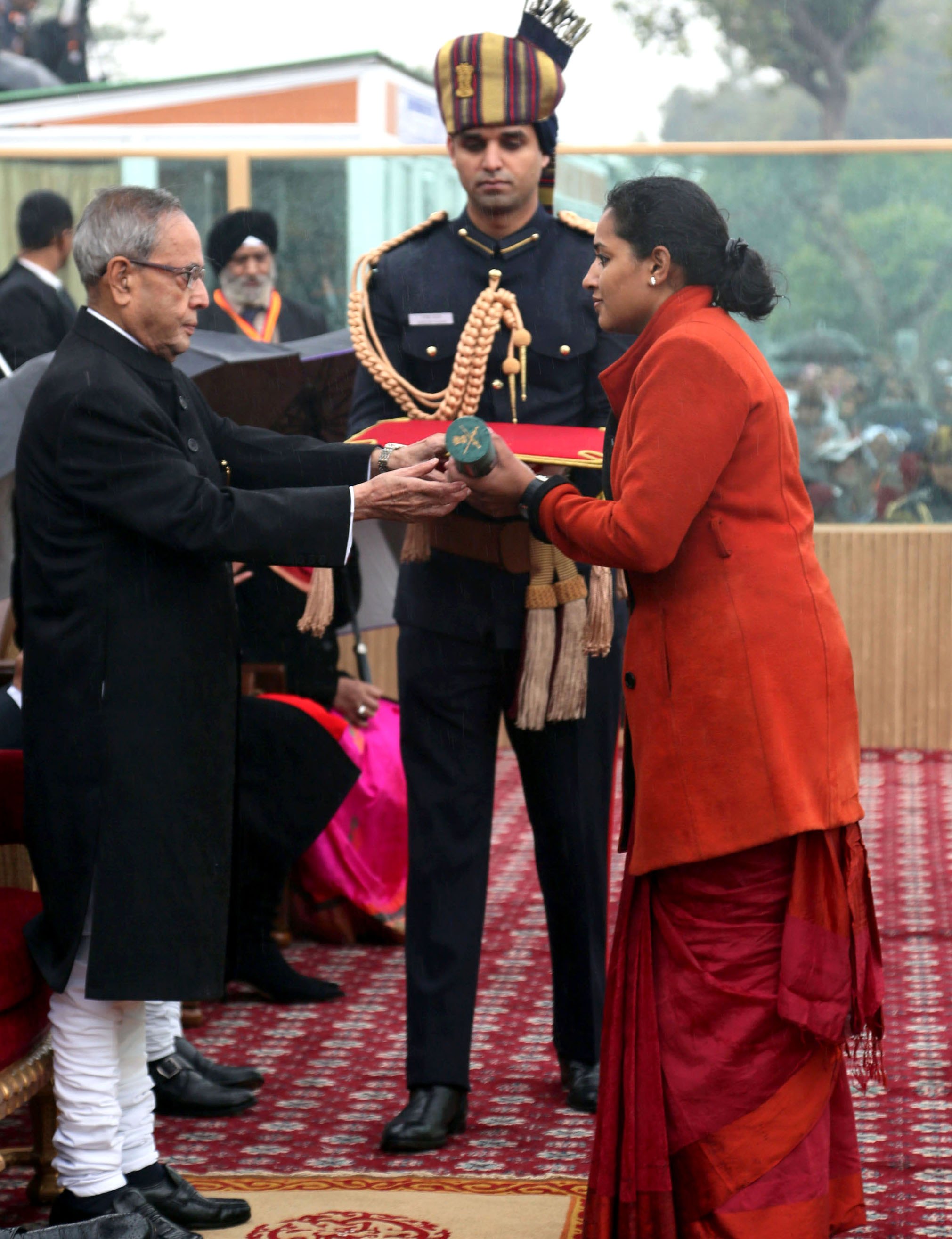
Mukund's wife receives the Ashoka Chakra from the Indian president in January 2015

After Mukund's funeral, Dabas wrote a letter to Mukund's wife, in which he remarked:

Each one of us who knew him will find our own way to overcome the loss. Grief will fade away and when it's gone, only one thing will remain—pride.

— Amit Singh Dabas, Commanding officer, 44 Rashtriya Rifles

On 15 August 2014, Mukund was posthumously awarded the Ashoka Chakra, India's highest peacetime gallantry award. It was presented to his wife Indhu by then-Indian president Pranab Mukherjee on 26 January 2015. His award commendation read as "(for showing) exemplary leadership skills, raw courage and swift action." It was further cited that:

[Major] Mukund Varadarajan exhibited most conspicuous bravery and exemplary leadership and made the supreme sacrifice while fighting with the terrorists

— Ashoka Chakra citation

On 1 June 2015, a statue of Mukund was unveiled at the premises of the Officers Training Academy in Chennai. The 2015 Malayalam film Picket 43 was dedicated to Mukund, who had been assisting the film crew during production. In 2024, a Tamil film, Amaran, a biopic based on Mukund's life, was released, with Sivakarthikeyan portraying Mukund in the film.

Following a request from the Indian Army in June 2026, the Government of Tamil Nadu named the Velachery–Tambaram Road in Chennai as Major Mukund Varadarajan Road after Mukund, who spent the early years of his life in Tambaram.
