= Panje Mangesh Rao =

Indian writer and poet (1874–1937)

- Born: 22 February 1874; Bantwal
- Died: 1937 (aged 62–63)
- Occupations: Headmaster, Author
- Writing career
- Period: 1874–1937
- Genres: Folklore, Poetry, Translation
- Movement: Navodaya

Panje Mangesh Rao (1874–1937) was an Indian writer and poet who wrote short stories, essays, poems and children's rhymes in Kannada. He is known as 'kavishishya'. He wrote Huthariya haadu, Naagara haave, Koti chennaya, Gudugudu Gummata Devaru, Maathaado raamappa.

== Life ==
Mangesh Rao's ancestors hailed from Panje, now in Dakshina Kannada. He was born on 22 February 1874 to Ramappayya and Seethamma, Chitrapur Saraswat Konkani Brahmins, and had six siblings. After finishing primary schooling, in Bantwal, he had to go to Mangalore to study in high school. His proficiency in Kannada brought him a Kannada translator's job, on a monthly salary of twenty rupees, even before he completed graduation. He married Girijabai and had six children. They took active interest in his literary pursuits and his love of music. Later he completed his B.A. degree and got a teacher's diploma as well. He was also appointed Inspector of schools. In 1934, he was elected President of All India Kannada Conference held at Raichur, then under the Nizam of Hyderabad's rule. At the age of sixty-three, he died of pneumonia in 1937. Distinguished littérateurs such as Masti Venkatesh Iyengar, Shivaram Karanth and Kuvempu had paid rich tribute in moving terms. His Great Grandson is journalist Shiv Aroor.

== Works ==
Mangesh Rao is credited with the creation of Navodaya literature in Kannada. He wrote in both Konkani and Kannada. He had worked on drama, poetry, translations and other branches of literature. Among his most famous compositions are Nagarahave! (Snake) a popular children's rhyme taught in primary schools like Mina Mina minuguva nakshatra(Kannada version of twinke twinkle little star. Huttari Hadu (Harvest Song), another famous composition, praises the Kodava people and their land Kodagu. He also helped popularise the Tulu legend, Koti and Chennayya. Tenkanagaliyata (Ode to southern Wind) is yet another popular composition of Mangesh Rao's.
