= Kuruthi Aattam =

2022 film directed by Sri Ganesh

- Poster
- Directed by: Sri Ganesh
- Written by: Sri Ganesh
- Starring: Atharvaa; Priya Bhavani Shankar
- Cinematography: Dinesh Purushothaman
- Edited by: Anil Krish
- Music by: Yuvan Shankar Raja
- Production company: Rock Fort Entertainment
- Release date: 5 August 2022
- Country: India
- Language: Tamil

Kuruthi Aattam (transl. Game of Blood) is a 2022 Indian Tamil-language action drama film written and directed by Sri Ganesh. It features Atharvaa, Kanna Ravi, Priya Bhavani Shankar, Radhika Sarathkumar, Radha Ravi, Vatsan Chakravarthy, Vinod Sagar and Prakash Raghavan.

The film was first announced in April 2017 and production began in August 2018. It was anticipated to release in June 2020, but was postponed amid the COVID-19 pandemic. The film was then scheduled to release on 24 December 2021, but got postponed due to legal issues.

Eventually, Kuruthi Aattam was released theatrically on 5 August 2022 and received mixed reviews from critics.

== Plot ==
Shakthivel is a government hospital attender and a Kabaddi player, who lives in Madurai which is ruled by two political bigwigs Gandhimathi and Durai. During a Kabaddi match, Shakthi meets Gandhimathi's son Muthu and soon they become friends. However, Muthu's friend and Durai's son Arivu is jealous of Shakthi due to a dispute, where he wants to settle score with him and Muthu and take over Gandhimathi's position. Arivu plans Muthu and Gandhimati's attack simultaneously in different places, where Muthu gets killed in a gang-war, while Gandhimathi survives and recognizes one of her attackers.

Shakthi finds that one of Gandhimathi's attackers is actually his little friend Kanmani's father Karnan. With Gandhimathi sending her men to avenge Muthu's death by hunting the attackers including Karnan, Shakthi sets on a crusade to avenge Muthu's death and bring Kanmani to the hospital in time for her treatment as she is suffering from viral infection. Shakthi eventually finds Karnan and escapes, where he arrives at the attacker's hideout. At the hideout, Durai learns about Arivu's misdeeds and tries to shoot him and Kanmani's parents, but Shakthi arrives to stop him. During the scuffle, Kanmani is kidnapped by Arivu, while her parents and Durai are killed.

Shakthi manages to escape with the help of his friends and love interest Vennila despite being stabbed by Arivu's henchman Sethu. Arivu learns that Shakthi's parents were killed by Gandhimathi's men in a riot and makes Gandhimathi assume that Shakthi planned the attack to seek revenge. Shakhi and Kanmani are brought to Gandhimathi, but Shakthi manages to prove his innocence and exposes Arivu in front of Gandhimathi. A fight ensues where Shakthi and Gandhimathi manages to kill Arivu, Sethu and his henchmen, thus avenging Muthu's death and protecting Kanmani. Shakthi and Gandhimathi brings Kanmani to the hospital in time and finally saves her.

== Cast ==
- Atharvaa as Shakthivel "Shakthi"
- Kanna Ravi as Muthu
- Priya Bhavani Shankar as Vennila
- Radha Ravi as Durai
- Radhika Sarathkumar as Gandhimathi
- Vatsan Chakravarthy as Sethu
- Baby Divyadarshini as Kanmani
- Vinod Sagar as Karnan, Kanmani's father
- Prakash Raghavan as Arivu
- Bala Hasan

== Production ==
In April 2017 after the release of his directorial debut 8 Thottakkal, Sri Ganesh announced that his next film would star Atharvaa in the lead role. As a result of the actor's busy schedule, the film was kept on hold for a year with Ganesh using the break to develop the script of the film. Produced by Rock Fort Entertainment, the film was officially launched in August 2018 with Ganesh stating that the film would tell the tale of gangsters based in Madurai.

Radhika Sarathkumar and Radharavi joined the cast to play siblings during the first schedule, while Priya Bhavani Shankar was confirmed as the film's lead actress during the following month. Before signing on, Priya requested the director to rework the script to add to the value of her character in the film. Yuvan Shankar Raja agreed to compose the soundtrack and background score. The film began its shoot in September 2018.

== Soundtrack ==
The music and background score were composed by Yuvan Shankar Raja.

Track listing
No.	Title	Lyrics	Singer(s)	Length
1.	"Thaalatum Mounam"	Karthik Netha	Swetha Mohan	3:47
2.	"Kuruthi Aattam - Title Song"	M. C. Sanna	M. C. Sanna	2:30
3.	"Ranga Rattinam"	Yugabharathi	Anthony Daasan	4:16
4.	"Hope Song"	Karthik Netha	Sriram Parthasarathy	4:56
Total length:				14:29

== Release ==
=== Theatrical ===
The film was released theatrically on 5 August 2022.

=== Home media ===
The satellite and streaming rights of the film were acquired by Aha and Colors Tamil.

== Reception ==
Kuruthi Aattam received mixed reviews from critics.

=== Critical response ===
Logesh Balachandran of The Times of India gave 3/5 stars and wrote "Kuruthi Aattam is a decent action entertainer which could have done really well with better writing in the second half." Thinkal Menon of OTTplay gave 3/5 stars and wrote "As the title suggests, Kuruthi Aattam involves numerous murders, complicated assassination plans, aggressive rivalry and revenge-seeking men and women. The director manages to hold the attention of the viewers to a decent extent despite a few flaws."

Kirubakar Purushothaman of The Indian Express gave 2.5/5 stars and stated "Apart from the overwritten emotional portions, this Sri Ganesh-Atharavaa film is let down by shoddy editing." Sudhir Srinivasan of Cinema Express gave 2.5/5 stars and wrote "Kuruthi Attam is a bunch of angry, yelling men, running at each other brandishing aruvaas.

Srinivasa Ramanujam of The Hindu wrote "With Kuruthi Aattam, Sri Ganesh shows another glimpse into that promise, but packs in too many elements to keep us glued to the screen." Priyanka Sundar of Firstpost wrote "Kuruthi Aattam is a fragmented tale about betrayal and revenge that suffers from inconsistent writing and haphazard execution."
