= Sri Chandrasekharendra Saraswathi Viswa Mahavidyalaya =

Deemed university at Kancheepuram in Tamil Nadu, India

- Motto: Vande Sadgurum Chandrasekharam
- Type: Deemed
- Established: 1993
- Affiliations: UGC, AICTE, AIU, NAAC, CSI, CII, British Council
- Chancellor: Prof.Dr.Vempaty.Kutumba Sastry
- Vice-Chancellor: Prof.Dr.G.Srinivasu
- Location: Kanchipuram, Tamil Nadu, India; 12°51′39″N 79°44′1″E
- Campus: Enathur, 50 acres (200,000 m^{2})
- Website: www.kanchiuniv.ac.in

Sri Chandrasekarendra Saraswathi Viswa Maha Vidyalaya (SCSVMV) is deemed university at Kancheepuram in Tamil Nadu, India. The university was established in 1993 with the blessing of Their Holiness Pujyasri Jayendra Saraswathi Swamigal and Pujyasri Sankara Vijayendra Saraswati Swamigal. It attained the status of Deemed University in 1993.

The Ministry of Human Resources Development declared the institution a 'Deemed University' under Section 3 of the UGC Act, on 26.05.1993.

== Location ==
The university is on a campus of 50 acres (200,000 m^{2}) at Enathur, four kilometres from Kancheepuram and 80 kilometres from Chennai.

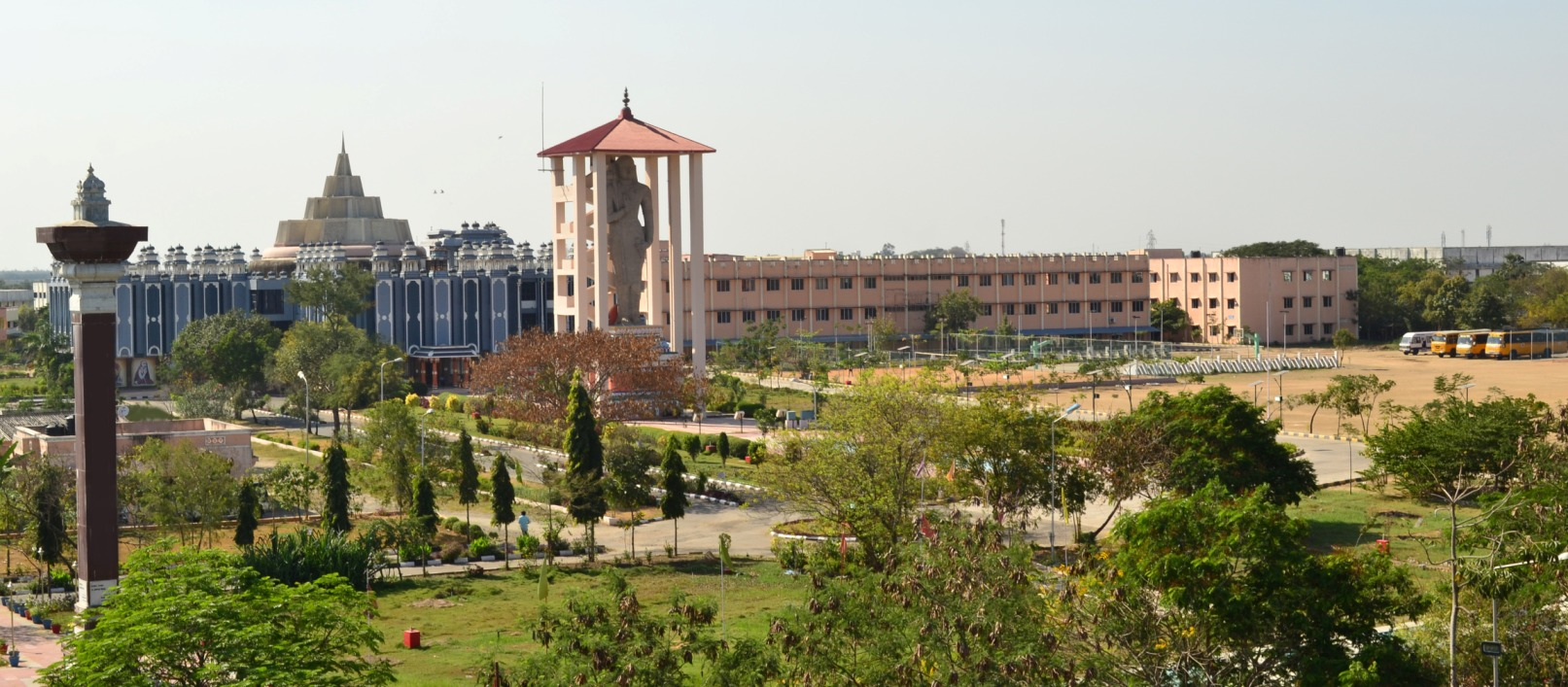

== Memoranda of understanding ==
The university has MOUs with the following institutions:

- Birla Institute of Technology and Science
- French Institute of Pondicherry
- Great Lakes Institute of Management
- Indira Gandhi Centre for Atomic Research
- Indian Institute of Technology Madras, Chennai
- Kellogg Graduate School of Management
- National Stock Exchange of India Ltd, Mumbai
- Universitas Hindu Indonesia, Bali, Indonesia
- Yogi Ramsurtkumar Research Foundation for Asian Culture, Tiruvannamalai

== Research ==
The university promotes research and development in all its departments, under the dean of research and development.

Ph.D. programmes are offered in all departments. The Department of Sanskrit and Indian Culture has produced more than 25 doctoral degrees. A large number of researchers are pursuing their doctoral research programmes. Admissions are offered twice a year into the doctoral programmes.

== Academic departments ==
The university consists of the following schools:

- School of Management
- School of Education
- School of Engineering and Technology
- School of Science
- School of Social Science and Humanity
- School of Health and Life Science
- School of Languages
- School of Sanskrit and Indian Culture

== Facilities ==
=== Transport ===
The institution has buses for students and staff members commuting from Kancheepuram, Chennai, Walajabad and Ranipet.

=== Accommodation ===
Separate, well-furnished, decent boys hostels and girls hostels have been constructed for the boys and girls studying on campus. Drinking water is supplied through the Modren RO systems. Both North and South Indian food will be available, including Andra vegetarian meals. Hot water facilities for bathing, washing machines for washing clothes, a gym, play grounds, WiFi, medical facilities, and 24×7 security monitoring are also available. Bank, post office, and ATM facilities are available next to the university entrance. Auto, bus, and train facilities are available to visit Kancheepuram, Chennai, and surrounding areas. A separate canteen facility is available for day scholars coming from outside the campus. Lunch, tea, coffee, tiffin, and snacks are available in the canteen for students, outside visitors, and parents.

=== Library ===
The university has the Sri Chandrasekharendra Saraswathi International Library, established in 1995, housed in Sri Jayendra Saraswathi Diamond Jubilee Mahal. It is spread across an area of 7,500 square feet (700 m^{2}) with three floors. There are around 200,000 books, periodicals and electronic services including over 1,000 tapes and CD-ROMs. The library has a collection of books relating to Engineering and Technology, Management, Science, Humanities, Sanskrit Literature, Tamil Literature, Arts, Indian Culture, Life Sciences, Education, and subscribes to over 200 national and international journals and also all Leading Magazines and Newspapers.

=== Medical centre ===
A medical centre in the campus provides medical care to students and staff.
