= 8 Thottakkal =

2017 film by Sri Ganesh

- Poster
- Directed by: Sri Ganesh
- Written by: Sri Ganesh
- Produced by: M. Vellapandian
- Starring: Vetri; Aparna Balamurali; M. S. Bhaskar; Nassar; Manikandan
- Cinematography: Dinesh K. Babu
- Edited by: Nagooran Ramachandran
- Music by: K. S. Sundaramurthy
- Production companies: Vetrivel Saravana Cinemas; Big Print Pictures Production
- Distributed by: Sakthi Film Factory
- Release date: 7 April 2017
- Running time: 145 minutes
- Country: India
- Language: Tamil

8 Thottakkal (transl. 8 Bullets) is a 2017 Indian Tamil-language crime thriller film written and directed by Sri Ganesh in his directoral debut. Produced by Vellapandian, the film stars his son Vetri, alongside an ensemble cast including Aparna Balamurali, Nassar, M. S. Bhaskar and Meera Mithun. Principal photography commenced in August 2016 at Chennai and was completed in November 2016. The film released on 7 April 2017.

The film, which was loosely inspired by the 1949 Japanese movie Stray Dog, was remade in Kannada as 8MM Bullet (2018), Telugu as Senapathi (2021), and Malayalam as Corona Papers (2023).

== Plot ==
The film starts with an orphaned boy, Sathya, getting framed by the employer for the murder of his wife and is sent to juvenile. He befriends the warden, who helps him secure a sub-inspector job.

Sathya follows his warden's advice and works honestly. Unlike his stationmates, he refuses bribes and is shunned. Sathya assists a writer after Gunasekaran, his dishonest inspector, beats him. Guna wants to disgrace Sathya because he thinks he's seeking hero status by making him appear horrible. Guna then assigns Sathya to track a violent thug. While following the mobster, he drops his 8-shot revolver. Sathya has one day to find his gun or be disciplined by Guna.

A reporter friend, Meera, helps Sathya find the boy who took his rifle and sold it. A bank robbery goes wrong when the gun buyer and two others fire and kill a female. Meera worries about her job and informs her supervisors, which becomes viral and suspends Sathya. Pandian, the new case handler, finds Sathya hiding from police before he's arrested. Sathya joins Pandian after he says he should search like a cop.

The boss objects, but one robber steals all the new notes to buy his girlfriend a necklace for her birthday. He's nabbed at the jewelry shop because police monitored fresh note serial numbers. Escapes arrest and earns his share. He is shot and dies, trying to steal the money after a disagreement with the boss. Left two buries body. The second robber phones the police, fearing the boss would shoot him. The boss kills the second robber to prevent authorities from linking him to him when they try to capture him.

Sathya encounters Krishnamurthy, an old policeman suspended for letting a terrorist escape as a constable. Guna released the terrorist after accepting a bribe, ruining Murthy's career. Sathya tells Murthy about life's changes. Murthy leaves after seeing the gun seller. Murthy murders him with the same revolver when he follows him to a restroom. Murthy leads the robbery and kills the officer who didn't approve his Provident Fund. Now seeking for murder clues, Sathya finds Murthy's application approved and gives it to him at his house. He discovers that Murthy is the robber and boss by connecting the murder of the gun seller to his son's allegation that the application was approved and that Murthy donated the money to the family.

Murthy kills Guna in a bank and throws away the money. Murthy returns home to police encirclement. SATHYA flees with his gun when Pandian kidnaps Murthy's grandchild. Murthy shot Pandian and Sathya killed him in self-defense, the investigating board learns. Job restored for Sathya.

Meera tells Sathya not to feel guilty about Murthy because he was horrible while driving. See what occurs in that room. Pandian slips and shoots Murthy's grandson's head. Pandian missed his grandchild when Murthy shot and killed him in terror. Sathya grabs Murthy and fights him but cannot hurt him because he cares. Murthy stands, grabs the gun, and commands Sathya to shoot him. Since he heard his family discussing why God didn't take him instead of his wife, he didn't tell them about his illness. He says he robbed the bank for them and wanted to die kingly. Murthy cries and swears he didn't mean to shoot the child. Murthy grabs Sathya's hands, holds the gun to his forehead, and vows he won't shame the family in prison. He kills himself with the last gunshot when Sathya hesitates. The film ends with Sathya meeting his framer at a stoplight.

== Cast ==
- Vetri as Sub Inspector Sathya
- Aparna Balamurali as Meera Vasudevan
- M. S. Bhaskar as Krishnamurthy
- Nassar as Pandian
- Manikandan as Jai
- Lallu as Kathir
- Mime Gopi as Inspector Gunasekaran (Guna)
- T. Siva as Das, Police Officer
- Charles Vinoth as Bhaskar
- Ranjith as Pickpocket
- R. S. Shivaji as Complainant
- Robo Chandru as a police officer
- Meera Mithun as Maha, Bhaskar's Wife

== Production ==
After working under director Mysskin as an assistant director in Onaayum Aattukkuttiyum (2013), Sri Ganesh started working on his script, which he revealed to be a cop thriller. Talking about the film, Sri Ganesh said that since it is a film about criminals trying to take advantage of a specific situation, it allowed him to understand the mindset of police officers. Ganesh attributed parts of the film to real-life incidents and literature, citing he was interested by the mystery series of Inspector Martin Beck. For the film, he also spent time speaking to the cop who was part of the 2012 Velachery encounters, where five men suspected of robbing banks in the city were shot dead, with Nassar's character in his story being partly based on this policeman. The production began in August 2016 and ended in November 2016, with the film shot almost entirely in Chennai, over a period of 47 days.

Newcomer Vetri was selected to play the lead role of a sub-inspector in the film, with his family producing the film. Actress Aparna Balamurali was signed on as the lead actress soon after the release of her debut Malayalam film Maheshinte Prathikaaram (2016), and revealed that she would play the character of a scribe. Actress Meera Mithun also worked on the film, which became the first film release. Other members of the cast included Nassar and M. S. Bhaskar, while Ranjith, the brother of Kaaka Muttai actor Ramesh, also made his debut as a petty thief.

== Soundtrack ==
8 Thottakkal

Soundtrack album by KS Sundaramurthy
- Released: 18 March 2017
- Recorded: 2016
- Language: Tamil
- Label: U1 Records
- Producer: KS Sundaramurthy

KS Sundaramurthy chronology
Avam (2015)	8 Thottakkal (2017)	Echcharikkai (2018)

KS Sundaramurthy composed the songs and background score for the film. Yuvan Shankar Raja bought the audio rights of 8 Thottakkal under his banner, U1 Records.

No.	Title	Lyrics	Singer(s)	Length
1.	"Nee Illai Endraal"	Kutti Revathy	Haricharan, Vandana Srinivasan	4:20
2.	"Andhi Sayura Neram"	GKB	Yogi Sekar & Padmalatha	3:20
3.	"Ithu Pol"	Kutti Revathy	Sathya Prakash	4:00
4.	"Mannipaya Ena Kekathe"	Sri Ganesh	Udhay Kannan, Aparna Balamurali	4:10
Total length:				15:17

== Release ==
The film had a theatrical release on 7 April 2017, alongside Mani Ratnam's Kaatru Veliyidai (2017). In their review of the film, Sify.com wrote, "To conclude, 8 Thottakkal definitely has minor flaws including the impassive hero and lengthy second half, but still, the film is a satisfying watch". The reviewer added that "8 Thottakkal has plenty of positive aspects to discuss but two things have certainly reduced the quality of the film, one is the wooden hero who just can't act and the other one is unnecessary song sequences, which comes as speed-breakers", while stating "another issue is the length of the film is a bit of a downer as the long drawn out scene composition tests your patience — but despite these flaws, the film is worth a look and hits the target with the heart touching performance of MS Baskar, who has given his career best". A reviewer from The Times of India noted "Taking the set-up of Akira Kurosawa's Stray Dog, Sri Ganesh gives us a slow-burning cop thriller which changes track halfway and becomes a contemplation on life. It is a risky move because the film starts to empathise more with its antagonist and wants us to do the same as well, but surprisingly, Sri Ganesh manages this feat". The critic added "the director gives us songs that break the mood and momentum of the film" and that "you really are baffled that a director who displays such confidence in letting his film unfurl at a meditative pace would settle for such compromises".

== See also ==
- Remakes of films by Akira Kurosawa
