= Remakes of films by Akira Kurosawa =

A number of Akira Kurosawa's films have been remade.

Note: This list includes full remakes only; it does not include films whose narratives have been loosely inspired by the basic plot of one or more of the director's films – as A Bug's Life (1998) references both Seven Samurai (1954) and its Hollywood remake The Magnificent Seven (1960) – nor movies that adopt, adapt, or parody individual plot elements or characters from a Kurosawa film without adapting the entire film, as Star Wars (1977) did with The Hidden Fortress (1958).

The 1999 movie Inferno (Desert Heat) with Jean Claude Van Damme is also a remake of Yojimbo. It was directed by John G. Avildsen who asked his name to be changed from the credits to Danny Mulroon because of creative differences.

The information below is derived from the Akira Kurosawa's IMDb page and the director's filmography by Galbraith (2002).

== Table ==
Year	Original title of remake	English title	Remake of	Director	Country of origin	Kurosawa credited?
1955	Sugata Sanshiro	Sanshiro Sugata	Sanshiro Sugata	Shigeo Tanaka	Japan	Yes
1960	The Magnificent Seven	—	Seven Samurai	John Sturges	USA	No (Note: Although the film credits Seven Samurai as its basis, neither Kurosawa himself nor Shinobu Hashimoto and Hideo Oguni receive such recognition.)
1960	Rashomon (Television) (Note: This television version of the Fay and Michael Kanin stage adaptation of the Kurosawa film appeared on the syndicated program The Play of the Week on 12 December 1960.)	—	Rashomon	Sidney Lumet	USA	Yes
1964	Per un pugno di dollari	A Fistful of Dollars	Yojimbo (unauthorized) (Note: Sergio Leone took the plot and characters for his classic Western directly from Kurosawa's Yojimbo without authorization. According to one source, during the filming, Leone was "slaving over a moviola machine and copying Yojimbo, changing only the setting and details of the dialogue." Kurosawa himself wrote a letter to Leone, saying "[A Fistful of Dollars] is a very fine film, but it is my film" and demanding payment. The case was eventually settled out of court, with Kurosawa receiving 15 percent of the Italian film's worldwide box office. See Galbraith (2002).)	Sergio Leone	Italy-Spain-West Germany	No
1964	The Outrage	—	Rashomon	Martin Ritt	USA	Yes
1965	Sugata Sanshiro	Sanshiro Sugata	Sanshiro Sugata and Sanshiro Sugata II	Seiichiro Uchikawa	Japan	Yes (Note: Kurosawa produced, adapted (from his own scripts) and, according to one source, edited this remake. Future remakes of the Sanshiro Sugata story were based directly upon Tsuneo Tomita's novel, rather than Kurosawa's 1943 film.)
1966	Django	—	Yojimbo	Sergio Corbucci	Italy-Spain	No
1967	Alamat ng 7 kilabot	Legend of the 7 Monsters	Seven Samurai	Armando A. Herrera	Philippines	No
1968	Xue cheng	The Last Day of Hsianyang, a.k.a. The Last Days of Hsin Yang, a.k.a. They Died For Their Princess	The Hidden Fortress	Fu Di Lin	Taiwan – Hong Kong	Yes
1973	Nora Inu	Stray Dog	Stray Dog	Azuma Morisaki	Japan	Yes
1976	Il conto è chiuso	The Last Round	Yojimbo	Stelvio Massi	Italy	No
1980	Battle Beyond the Stars	—	Seven Samurai (unauthorized)	Jimmy T. Murakami; Roger Corman (uncredited)	USA	No
1984	The Warrior and the Sorceress	—	Yojimbo	John C. Broderick	USA	No
1989	Zhong yi qun ying	Seven Warriors	Seven Samurai	Terry Tong	Hong Kong	Yes, at least on the DVD cover.
1996	Omega Doom	—	Yojimbo	Albert Pyun	USA	No
1996	Last Man Standing	—	Yojimbo	Walter Hill	USA	Yes
1998	China Gate	—	Seven Samurai	Rajkumar Santoshi	India	Yes
2001	Kaze no Yojimbo (anime television series)	—	Yojimbo	Hayato Date	Japan	Yes
2004	Seven Samurai 20XX (video game)	—	Seven Samurai	Atsushi Ii	Japan	Yes
2004	Samurai 7 (anime television series)	—	Seven Samurai	Toshifumi Takizawa (and others)	Japan—USA	Yes
2007	Tsubaki Sanjurō	Sanjurō Tsubaki	Sanjuro	Yoshimitsu Morita	Japan	Yes
2007	Tengoku to Jigoku	Heaven and Hell	High and Low	Yasuo Tsuruhashi	Japan (TV)	No
2008	Kakushi Toride no San-Akunin: The Last Princess	Hidden Fortress: The Last Princess	The Hidden Fortress	Shinji Higuchi	Japan	Yes
1983	I sette magnifici gladiatori	The Seven Magnificent Gladiators	Seven Samurai	Bruno Mattei	Italy	No
2010	Star Wars: The Clone Wars Season 2 Episode 17: "Bounty Hunters"	—	Seven Samurai	Steward Lee	USA	The episode is dedicated to him
2011	U-Mong Pa Meung	At the Gate of the Ghost	Rashomon	M.L. Phundevanop Devakula	Thailand	Yes
2012	Gwanghae, Wangyidoen namja	Masquerade	Kagemusha	Chang-min Choo	South Korea	No
2016	The Magnificent Seven	—	Seven Samurai	Antoine Fuqua	USA	Yes
2019	The Mandalorian Season 1 Episode 4: "Chapter 4: Sanctuary"	—	Seven Samurai	Bryce Dallas Howard	USA	No
2020	Living	—	Ikiru	Oliver Hermanos	UK	Yes
2025	Highest 2 Lowest	—	High and Low	Spike Lee	USA	Yes
