= Sri Ganesh =

Indian film director and screenwriter

- Born: 1990 (age 35–36); Thiruvaikavur, Tamil Nadu, India
- Education: BCom, Jain College
- Occupations: Film Maker and Screenwriter
- Years active: 2017–present
- Notable work: 8 Thottakkal
- Spouse: Suhasini Sanjeev (m. 2022)

Sri Ganesh (born 1990) is an Indian film director who predominantly works in the Tamil film industry. He made his directorial debut with the film 8 Thottakkal in 2017.

== Early life ==
Ganesh's interest in cinema began in high school when he assisted Crazy Mohan's theatre troupe. He was inspired by Mysskin's films, particularly Nandalala, which made him join Mysskin's crew for Onaayum Aatukuttiyum (2013). Ganesh is also inspired by Rahul Dravid's resilience and patience.

== Career ==
Ganesh entered the film industry as an assistant director to Mysskin, from whom he learned the importance of discipline and was introduced to world cinema. He assisted Mysskin for two years. In 2013, Mysskin encouraged Ganesh to leave his position as an assistant director and focus on writing his own stories. His experience on the talent-hunt show, Naalaiya Iyakkunar, helped him connect with other emerging filmmakers.

Ganesh's debut film, 8 Thottakkal (2017) was shot in 48 days. The film was later remaked in Malayalam, titled Corona Papers, directed by Priyadarshan. The filming of Ganesh's second film, Kuruthi Aattam, started around 2018. Due to financial reasons and COVID-19 pandemic, it took 5 years for the film to release.

Ganesh collaborated with Siddharth in the movie 3BHK, slated to release in July 2025.

== Personal life ==
Ganesh was born in Thiruvaikavur near Kumbakonam. His mother, Alamelu, was based in Chennai due to his father Sankaran's work. Ganesh spent his early childhood in Kumbakonam with his grandparents until fourth grade before moving to Chennai to join his mother. He attended St. Paul's School in Chrompet until tenth grade and later joined the Chromepet Government School due to financial reasons. He graduated with a B.Com from Jain College, Chennai. Ganesh has a younger brother.

Ganesh married actress Suhasini Sanjeev on 7 September 2022. The couple had kept their relationship private from the media until the day of their wedding. Suhasini is known for her roles in films Nenjuku Needhi, Sarpatta Parambarai and Seethakaathi.

== Filmography ==
As director
Year	Title	Notes
2017	8 Thottakkal	Also lyricist
2022	Kuruthi Aattam	
2025	3BHK	Also lyricist
