= Rangoon (2017 Tamil film) =

2017 Indian film by Rajkumar Periasamy

- Theatrical release poster
- Directed by: Rajkumar Periasamy
- Written by: Rajkumar Periasamy; Sai Prasad Pochampally
- Produced by: A. R. Murugadoss; Fox Star Studios
- Starring: Gautham Ram Karthik; Sana Makbul
- Cinematography: Anish Tharun Kumar
- Edited by: Prasanna GK; Vijay Venkataramanan
- Music by: Original songs: Vikram RH; Vishal Chandrasekhar; Background score: Vishal Chandrasekhar
- Production companies: Fox Star Studios; AR Murugadoss Productions
- Distributed by: Fox Star Studios
- Release date: 8 June 2017
- Running time: 126 minutes
- Country: India
- Language: Tamil
- Box office: ₹40 crore

Rangoon is a 2017 Indian Tamil-language action crime film written and directed by Rajkumar Periasamy in his directoral debut and produced by A. R. Murugadoss. The film stars Gautham Ram Karthik and Sana Makbul. It was the fifth joint venture of AR Murugadoss Productions and Fox Star Studios.

Rangoon was released in 8 June 2017. The film received positive reviews from critics and became a commercial success at the box office. The film turned out to be the first hit film for Gautham Karthik.

== Plot ==
Venkat hails from the Burmese city of Rangoon, which has now been renamed Yangon by the regime. He lives as a Tamil Burma repatriation in a neighbourhood called Annai Sivagami Nagar also known as Burma Nagar in Ennore, Chennai. His family, in search of a better livelihood, has migrated from his birthplace to a neighbourhood of Chennai, where many other Tamil-Burma repatriates live.

Venkat grows up as an irresponsible youth and now is a college dropout who is looking for a job. Through his childhood friend Atho Kumar a.k.a. Kumaran, he gets an employment under Gunaseelan a.k.a. Siya, a respected businessman in the neighbourhood. His job is to attract passersby to the small secondhand gold shop. Venkat grows as a trustworthy aide to Siya, who is a secondhand gold dealer of Chennai's wholesale gold market, Sowcarpet. At one instance, Venkat saves the life of Siya from a murder attempt. This garners a promotion for Venkat. Venkat is promoted as the sole manager for Gunaseelan's import-export gold shop. The shop, only on the outlook, is an import-export shop, but underneath a back gate for the city's gold smuggling wing. Meanwhile, Venkat meets a club singer named Natasha and falls in love with her. She speaks sense into Venkat and tries to pull him out of smuggling and illegal trading.

Venkat decides to do one last job. He, with his closest friends of life, Kumaran and Tiptop a.k.a. Sasi, he indulges in gold smuggling to clear Siya's debts with the profits earned. In the same motive, he, along with his friends travels to Myanmar on a smuggling deal in an illegal route via a road crossing the borders, for Siya. Venkat's fancy-looking, street-smart goes awfully wrong as his money that he earned mysteriously goes missing in Yangon, Myanmar. This brings a disgrace to him and Siya amidst traders in the Chennai market. Venkat, in order to clear further debts, indulges in kidnap and ransom demanding. In a mishap, the three friends accidentally shoot the kidnapped kid. Things go awry. Furthermore, the plot unfolds the mystery, and the blatant truth is shown to Venkat. His learning from the experiences of a unique childhood, friendship, betrayal, and prison sentence makes him a learned man.

After four years, Venkat gets released from jail and starts his own small jewelry shop in the name of his father. Now, Venkat faces life with hope and faith, as a reformed man of his mid-20s.

== Cast ==
- Gautham Ram Karthik as Venkat
- Sana Makbul as Natasha
- Daniel Annie Pope as Tiptop a.k.a. Sasi
- Lallu as Atho Kumar a.k.a. Kumaran
- Siddique as Gunaseelan a.k.a. Siya
- Anand as DRI officer Syed Nawazuddin
- Shreekumar as Kesavan
- Sripriya as Indirani, Venkat's mother
- Upasana as Renu, Venkat's sister
- Prashanth Nair as Nirmal Thomas
- Supergood Subramani as Manohar
- Pillayar Ruthru as Pillaiyar Manivannan
- Sathyajith as Natasha's father
- Sindhu Shyam Ganesh as Esther Thomas
- Raneesh as Shanmugham
- Aroul D. Shankar

== Production ==
Rangoon is the directorial debut of Rajkumar Periasamy, previously an assistant director under A. R. Murugadoss. Production began on 20 November 2014. The film was shot primarily in Chennai and to a lesser extent in Myanmar.

== Release and reception ==
Baradwaj Rangan of Film Companion wrote "Rajkumar Periasamy gives us just a visual. He may not have made the most perfect film, but he leaves us with the thought that maybe he's a genuine filmmaker." Sreedhar Pillai from Firstpost described Rangoon as "a well made, engrossing and realistic film".

== Soundtrack ==
The soundtrack consists of six songs; 4 tracks composed by composer RH Vikram and 2 tracks composed by Vishal Chandrasekhar.

Rangoon

Soundtrack album by RH Vikram and Vishal Chandrasekhar
- Released: 2017
- Recorded: 2017
- Genre: Feature film soundtrack
- Length: 19:05
- Language: Tamil
- Label: Sony Music

RH Vikram chronology
Rangoon (2017)	Pandigai (2017)

Vishal Chandrasekhar chronology
7 Naatkal (2017)	Rangoon (2017)	Kathalo Rajakumari (2017)

No.	Title	Lyrics	Singers	Length
1.	"Yaathreega (The Journey Begins)"	Na. Muthukumar	Navin Iyer	4:08
2.	"Enai Marakirene (Natasha's Spirit)"	Gkb, Manoj Kumar	Kavita Thomas	2:53
3.	"Nee Illaa Aagayam (The Love Spark)"	Kabilan	Yazin Nizar	3:59
4.	"Ey Jajabor (The Trip of the Trio)"	Kraven Stratfile	Kraven Stratfile	2:38
5.	"Thottil Madiyil (Love's Lullaby)"	Vivek	Chinmayi	1:30
6.	"Foreign Returns (celebration in hood)"	Lallu	Anirudh Ravichander	3:57
Total length:				19:05
