= List of accolades received by Soorarai Pottru =

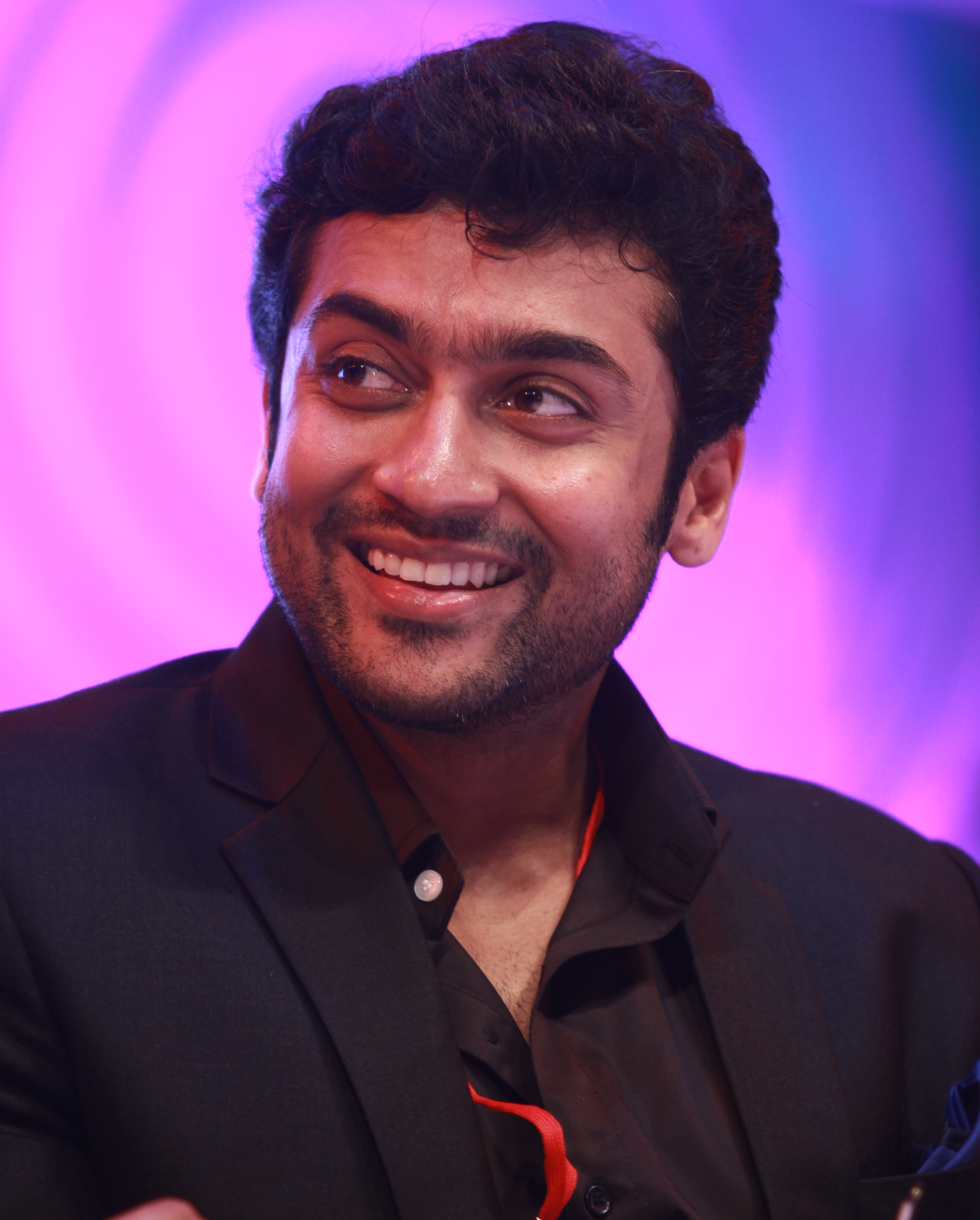
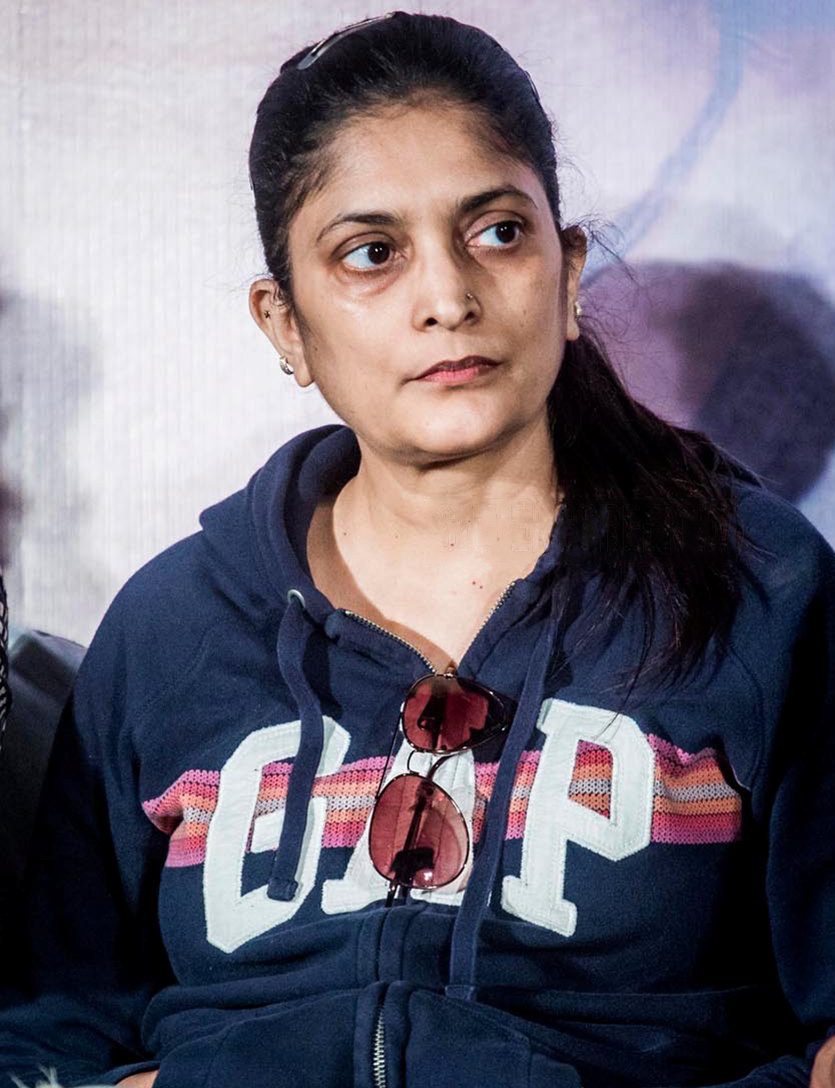
- Suriya (left) and Sudha Kongara (right) received several awards and nominations for the performances, scripting and direction, respectively
Awards and nominations
Award	Wins	Nominations
Ananda Vikatan Cinema Awards	2	-
Behindwoods Digital Awards	2	2
Blacksheep Digital Awards	3	3
Cinema At Its Best Awards	5	11
Critics Choice Film Awards	0	4
Edison Awards	2	10
Hit List OTT Awards	1	1
Indian Film Festival of Melbourne	2	3
JFW Movie Awards	3	3
Mirchi Music Awards South	2	8
Oxygen Play Awards	1	3
South Indian International Movie Awards	7	14
National Film Awards	5	5
Filmfare Awards South	8	10
Tamil Nadu State Film Awards	7	7

Totals (Note: Certain award groups do not simply award one winner. They acknowledge several different recipients, have runners-up, and have third place. Since this is a specific recognition and is different from losing an award, runner-up mentions are considered wins in this award tally. For simplification and to avoid errors, each award in this list has been presumed to have had a prior nomination.)
- Wins: 55
- Nominations: 84

Soorarai Pottru (transl. Hail the brave) is a 2020 Indian Tamil-language Drama Film directed by Sudha Kongara and produced by Suriya and Guneet Monga, under their respective banners 2D Entertainment and Sikhya Entertainment. Kongara conceptualised the script and screenplay along with Shalini Ushadevi, Aalif Surti and Ganeshaa, with dialogues written by Vijay Kumar. Suriya also starred in the film in leading roles with Paresh Rawal and Aparna Balamurali, while Urvashi, Mohan Babu, and Karunas amongst others in supporting roles. The film features music composed by G. V. Prakash Kumar, while cinematography and editing were handled by Niketh Bommireddy and Sathish Suriya respectively. Partially inspired by events from the life of Simplifly Deccan founder G. R. Gopinath, Soorarai Pottru revolves around Nedumaaran Rajangam (Suriya), who dreams to build a low-cost airline and the challenges he faces, in order to be successful in his quest.

The film which was originally scheduled for theatrical release was delayed multiple times due to post-production difficulties, which was followed by the COVID-19 pandemic in India. Soorarai Pottru was later released direct-to-streaming worldwide through the platform Amazon Prime Video on 12 November 2020. The film opened to positive critical response from critics and audiences. Critics praised Suriya's performance and Kongara's direction, scripting and screenplay, along with the performances of the cast and major technical aspects of the film, including cinematography, editing, music. The film is currently the third highest rated film on IMDb (a rating of 8.7), only behind The Shawshank Redemption (1994) and The Godfather (1972).

Soorarai Pottru was selected as one among ten Indian films to be screened under the Best Foreign Film category at the 78th Golden Globe Awards. The film made an official entry to the 93rd Academy Awards, for Best Actor, Best Actress, Best Director, Best Original Score and other categories, and was also made available to the members of the Academy of Motion Picture Arts and Sciences for votes and nomination at the Academy Screening Room. The film also emerged as the only Indian film amongst 366 films eligible for Best Picture in the award ceremony, but was eventually not nominated. Soorarai Pottru was screened at the Chennai International Film Festival and also at the Panorama Section of the Shanghai International Film Festival. The film was screened and won two awards at the Indian Film Festival of Melbourne – including Best Film and Best Actor (Surya). It was nominated at 14 categories at the 10th South Indian International Movie Awards, held for South Indian films released during 2020 and won seven awards.

== Awards and nominations ==
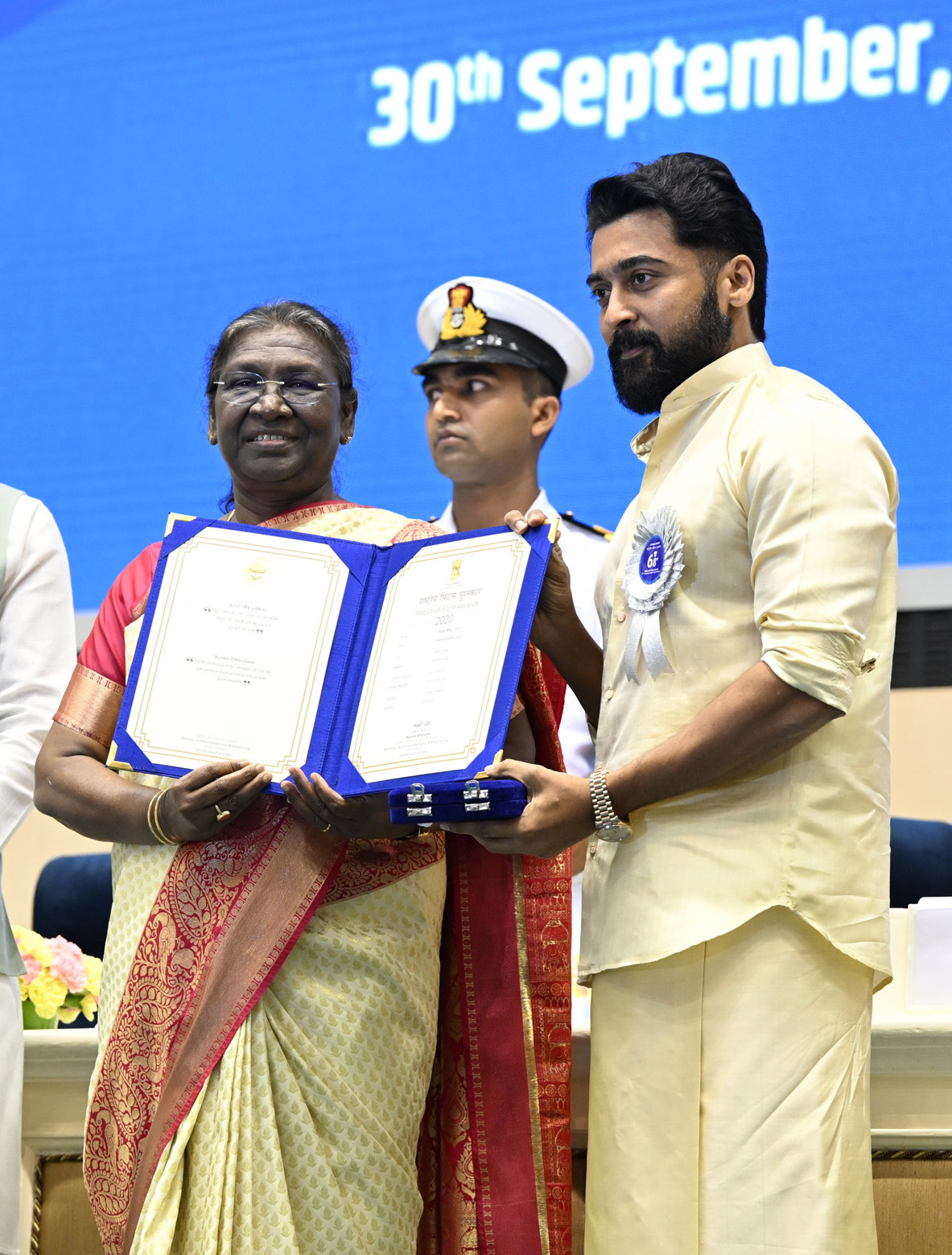
Suriya at the 68th National Film Awards ceremony receiving Best Actor Award

Award (Note: Awards, festivals and organizations are in alphabetical order.)	Date of ceremony (Note: Date is linked to the article about the awards held that year, wherever possible.)	Category	Recipient(s)	Result	Ref.
Indian Film Festival of Melbourne	20 August 2021	Best Film	2D Entertainment, Sikhya Entertainment	Won	
Indian Film Festival of Melbourne	20 August 2021	Best Director	Sudha Kongara	Nominated	
Indian Film Festival of Melbourne	20 August 2021	Best Actor (Feature Film)	Suriya	Won	
South Indian International Movie Awards	19 September 2021	Best Film – Tamil	2D Entertainment, Sikhya Entertainment	Won	
South Indian International Movie Awards	19 September 2021	Best Director – Tamil	Sudha Kongara	Won	
South Indian International Movie Awards	19 September 2021	Best Actor – Tamil	Suriya	Won	
South Indian International Movie Awards	19 September 2021	Best Actress – Tamil	Aparna Balamurali	Nominated	
South Indian International Movie Awards	19 September 2021	Best Actress (Critics) – Tamil	Aparna Balamurali	Won	
South Indian International Movie Awards	19 September 2021	Best Supporting Actor – Tamil	Mohan Babu	Nominated	
South Indian International Movie Awards	19 September 2021	Best Supporting Actress – Tamil	Urvashi	Nominated	
South Indian International Movie Awards	19 September 2021	Best Music Director – Tamil	G. V. Prakash Kumar	Won	
South Indian International Movie Awards	19 September 2021	Best Lyricist – Tamil	Vivek – (for "Veyyon Silli")	Nominated	
South Indian International Movie Awards	19 September 2021	Best Male Playback Singer – Tamil	Harish Sivaramakrishnan – (for "Veyyon Silli")	Won	
South Indian International Movie Awards	19 September 2021	Best Female Playback Singer – Tamil	Dhee – (for "Kaattu Payale")	Nominated	
South Indian International Movie Awards	19 September 2021	Best Female Playback Singer – Tamil	Saindhavi – (for "Kayilae Aagasam")	Nominated	
South Indian International Movie Awards	19 September 2021	Best Actor in a Negative Role – Tamil	Paresh Rawal	Nominated	
South Indian International Movie Awards	19 September 2021	Best Cinematographer – Tamil	Niketh Bommireddy	Won	
South Indian International Movie Awards	19 September 2021	Best Comedian – Tamil	Kaali Venkat	Nominated	
Edison Awards	6 March 2022	Best Film	2D Entertainment, Sikhya Entertainment	Nominated	
Edison Awards	6 March 2022	Best Director	Sudha Kongara	Nominated	
Edison Awards	6 March 2022	Best Screenplay	Sudha Kongara	Won	
Edison Awards	6 March 2022	Best Actor	Suriya	Nominated	
Edison Awards	6 March 2022	Best Actress	Aparna Balamurali	Nominated	
Edison Awards	6 March 2022	Best Supporting Actor – Female	Urvashi	Nominated	
Edison Awards	6 March 2022	Best Music Director	G. V. Prakash Kumar	Nominated	
Edison Awards	6 March 2022	Best Lyricist	Snehan – (for "Kaattu Payale")	Won	
Edison Awards	6 March 2022	Best Playback Singer – Male	Harish Sivaramakrishnan – (for "Veyyon Silli")	Nominated	
Edison Awards	6 March 2022	Best Playback Singer – Female	Dhee – (for "Kaattu Payale")	Nominated	
Mirchi Music Awards South	20 March 2022	Album of The Year – Tamil	Soorarai Pottru	Nominated	
Mirchi Music Awards South	20 March 2022	Song of The Year – Tamil	"Kaattu Payale"	Nominated	
Mirchi Music Awards South	20 March 2022	Song of The Year – Tamil	"Veyyon Silli"	Nominated	
Mirchi Music Awards South	20 March 2022	Music Composer of The Year – Tamil	G. V. Prakash Kumar – ("Veyyon Silli")	Nominated	
Mirchi Music Awards South	20 March 2022	Lyricist of The Year – Tamil	Snehan – ("Kaattu Payale")	Nominated	
Mirchi Music Awards South	20 March 2022	Female Vocalist of The Year – Tamil	Dhee – (for "Kaattu Payale")	Nominated	
Mirchi Music Awards South	20 March 2022	Listeners Choice Album of The Year – Tamil	Soorarai Pottru	Won	
Mirchi Music Awards South	20 March 2022	Listeners Choice Song of The Year – Tamil	"Veyyon Silli"	Nominated	
Mirchi Music Awards South	20 March 2022	Best Sound Mixing – Tamil	Jehovahson Alghar	Won	
National Film Awards	22 July 2022	Best Feature Film	Soorarai Pottru	Won	
National Film Awards	22 July 2022	Best Actor	Suriya (Note: shared with Ajay Devgn for Tanhaji: The Unsung Warrior (2020))	Won	
National Film Awards	22 July 2022	Best Actress	Aparna Balamurali	Won	
National Film Awards	22 July 2022	Best Music Direction – Score	G. V. Prakash Kumar	Won	
National Film Awards	22 July 2022	Best Original Screenplay	Shalini Usha Nair, Sudha Kongara	Won	
Filmfare Awards South	09 October 2022	Best Film	2D Entertainment, Sikhya Entertainment	Nominated	
Filmfare Awards South	09 October 2022	Best Director	Sudha Kongara	Won	
Filmfare Awards South	09 October 2022	Best Actor	Suriya	Won	
Filmfare Awards South	09 October 2022	Best Actress	Aparna Balamurali	Nominated	
Filmfare Awards South	09 October 2022	Critics Best Actress – Tamil	Aparna Balamurali	Won	
Filmfare Awards South	09 October 2022	Best Supporting Actor	Paresh Rawal	Nominated	
Filmfare Awards South	09 October 2022	Best Supporting Actress	Urvashi	Won	
Filmfare Awards South	09 October 2022	Best Music Director	G. V. Prakash Kumar	Won	
Filmfare Awards South	09 October 2022	Best Lyricist	Yugabharathi - (for "Kaiyilea Aagasam")	Nominated	
Filmfare Awards South	09 October 2022	Best Male Playback Singer	Christin Jos and Govind Vasantha - (for "Aagasam")	Won	
Filmfare Awards South	09 October 2022	Best Female Playback Singer	Dhee - (for "Kaattu Payale")	Won	
Filmfare Awards South	09 October 2022	Best Cinematographer	Niketh Bommireddy	Won	
Ananda Vikatan Cinema Awards	December 2022	Best Actor	Suriya	Won	
Ananda Vikatan Cinema Awards	December 2022	Best Supporting Actress	Urvashi	Won	
Tamil Nadu State Film Awards	13 February 2026	Best Film: Second Prize	—N/a	Won	
Tamil Nadu State Film Awards	13 February 2026	Best Actor	Suriya	Won	
Tamil Nadu State Film Awards	13 February 2026	Best Director	Sudha Kongara	Won	
Tamil Nadu State Film Awards	13 February 2026	Best Actress	Aparna Balamurali	Won	
Tamil Nadu State Film Awards	13 February 2026	Best Sound Design	Vishnu Govind	Won	
Tamil Nadu State Film Awards	13 February 2026	Best Music Direction	G. V. Prakash Kumar	Won	
Tamil Nadu State Film Awards	13 February 2026	Best Supporting Actor	Karunas	Won	

== See also ==
- List of Tamil films of 2020
