= Soorarai Pottru (soundtrack) =

2020 soundtrack album by G. V. Prakash Kumar

Soundtrack album by G. V. Prakash Kumar
- Released: 24 July 2020
- Recorded: 2019–2020
- Genre: Feature film soundtrack
- Length: 31:25
- Language: Tamil
- Label: Sony Music India
- Producer: G. V. Prakash Kumar

G. V. Prakash Kumar chronology
Asuran (2019)	Soorarai Pottru (2020)	Putham Pudhu Kaalai (2020)

Singles from Soorarai Pottru
- 1. "Maara Theme" Released: 24 January 2020; 2. "Veyyon Silli" Released: 13 February 2020; 3. "Mannurunda" Released: 9 March 2020; 4. "Kaattu Payale" Released: 23 July 2020

Soorarai Pottru is the soundtrack album, composed by G. V. Prakash Kumar, to the 2020 Indian Tamil-language drama film of the same name, directed by Sudha Kongara, starring Suriya and Paresh Rawal in the lead roles, along with Aparna Balamurali, Urvashi, and Mohan Babu in other prominent roles. The soundtrack album consists of 9 songs all of them were penned by lyricists Snehan, Yugabharathi, Vivek, Arunraja Kamaraj, Ekadesi, Maya Mahalingam and Arivu. The soundtrack album was released digitally on 24 July 2020, through the Sony Music India record label.

== Production ==
The film's soundtrack album and background score is composed by G. V. Prakash Kumar, working with Suriya for the first time. On 7 April 2019, before the start of the film's shoot, Prakash announced that he would be collaborating with the band Thaikkudam Bridge for a rock number in the film. Govind Vasantha, film composer and the band's frontman had stated that he had recreated the tune phrase from "Urumbu", a track from the band's studio album Navarasam (2015), sung along with Christin Jos. Later Prakash, also announced that playback singer Dhee would record a funky number for the film. In July 2019, it was reported that, Senthil Ganesh sung a rustic number for the film. In August 2019, Prakash revealed that a new singer will record a number on the rock-genre, whose name is yet to be revealed soon, but did not sing the track. In October 2019, Harish Sivaramakrishnan of the Agam band recorded one song for the film. In November 2019, it was revealed that a special theme music will be included in the film's teaser. Later he announced that Suriya will croon the rap versions for the film's theme music, which was titled as "Maara Theme". The song marked his third stint as a singer after he sung for a song in Anjaan (2014) and the unreleased film Party. The audio rights have been acquired by Sony Music India.

== Release ==
The first single track, a theme song titled "Maara Theme" which was included in the film's official teaser, was released on 24 January 2020. The second single track, titled "Veyyon Silli" was released at a special launching ceremony that was held inside SpiceJet's Boeing 737 aircraft flying on mid-air on 13 February 2020, the first in Tamil cinema history to hold a film's music launch during mid-air flight. 100 first-time fliers including 70 school children are invited to the single track launch which was held during mid-air flight. The third single track "Mannurunda" was released on 9 March 2020. A 1-minute video of fourth single track "Kaattu Payale" was released on 23 July 2020, coinciding on Suriya's birthday, and the full song was released the same day,

The full album of Soorarai Pottru was released on 24 July 2020, in music platforms and in YouTube. The same day, the makers unveiled the soundtrack of its dubbed Telugu version, Aakasam Nee Haddhu Raa, although the soundtrack for the dubbed Malayalam and Kannada version were released, a day before the film's originally scheduled premiere (on 30 October 2020). Despite the full songs being released, The lyrical videos for "Aagasam", "Naalu Nimisham" and "Usurey" were released through YouTube on 23 October 6 and 10 November respectively. Post release, a bonus track "Kayilae Aagasam" was unveiled on 13 November 2020.

== Reception ==
The soundtrack album, especially the songs "Veyyon Silli" and "Kaattu Payale" received positive response from listeners. Reviewing for the former, Behindwoods stated that the song is enjoyable, similar to another hit "Othayadi Pathayile" from Kanaa (2018). In their review, it stated "The song is well composed as it clearly makes you want to get from your sedentary position and tap your foot. The song has a rural background in its instrumental arrangement in the second layer if you pay attention and also employs good percussion to suit the current trends. When you have a powerful singer like Harish, it makes sense to leverage it and that is what GV Prakash has done by making use of his vocals in the interludes as well. The violin interlude does play a role the second time around and that is one of the highlights of the song." The song "Kaattu Payale" within its release in July 2020, was listed around top 100 songs in YouTube.

Reviewing for the soundtrack album, Vipin Nair of Music Aloud gave the album 4 out of 5 stating "G V Prakash Kumar has been on a pretty productive composing run these past couple of years, but in Soorarai Pottru he delivers his best soundtrack in a long time!"

As a year-ender special, Anjana Shekhar, listed "Kaattu Payale" and "Veyyon Silli" in her article about 7 Tamil Songs That Needed in Your Playlist, for the Indian digital news platform, The News Minute. The Times of India, listed ""Kaattu Payale" in one of in the 5 Chartbuster Tamil Songs of 2020. Five of its songs (with Kaattu Payale in the top-third position) were listed in their Top Tamil Tracks of 2020, for the music platform Spotify. Soorarai Pottru became the third most streamed Tamil album of JioSaavn in 2020, with "Veyyon Silli", became the most streamed Tamil song, in its music platform.

== Controversy ==
In September 2020, a petition was filed against the makers on the Madras High Court, about the song "Mannurunda" which had lyrics featuring offensive lines. The petitioner pointed out the lines: "Keezh saadhi udambukulla odurathu saakadaya? Andha mel saadhi kaaranuku rendu kombirundha kaatungaiya" (Is it drainage that runs in the body of a lower caste person? Show if that upper caste person has two horns), and queried that these lines could disrupt peace between two castes and create unwanted political tensions. Although, Indiaglitz in its review for the song (dated 9 March 2020), stated that "the song slaps hard on casteism and disparities".

== Track listing ==
Soorarai Pottru - Tamil
No.	Title	Lyrics	Singer(s)	Length
1.	"Mannurunda"	Ekadasi	Senthil Ganesh	3:48
2.	"Veyyon Silli"	Vivek	Harish Sivaramakrishnan	5:03
3.	"Kaattu Payale"	Snehan	Dhee	4:06
4.	"Sooravalli"	Ekadesi	Senthil Ganesh	0:34
5.	"Naalu Nimisham"	Maya Mahalingam	Krishnaraj	3:58
6.	"Aagasam"	Arunraja Kamaraj	Christin Jos, Govind Vasantha	4:36
7.	"Maara Theme"	Arivu	Suriya, G. V. Prakash Kumar	1:10
8.	"Usurey"	Maya Mahalingam	G. V. Prakash Kumar	5:01
9.	"Kaiyiley Aagasam"	Yugabharathi	Saindhavi	3:18
Total length:				31:25

Aakaasam Nee Haddhu Raa - Telugu
No.	Title	Lyrics	Singer(s)	Length
1.	"Maha Theme"	Pranav Chaganty	Suriya	1:10
2.	"Pilla Puli"	Ramajogayya Sastry	Anurag Kulkarni	5:03
3.	"Sithramaina Bhoomi"	Rakendu Mouli	Rahul Sipligunj, Revanth	3:47
4.	"Kaatuka Kanule"	Bhaskarabhatla	Dhee	4:06
5.	"Sakhiye"	Ramajogayya Sastry	Yadu Krishnan K	3:58
6.	"Aakaasam Nee Haddhu Ra"	Ramajogayya Sastry	Dhanunjay, Anurag Kulkarni	4:36
7.	"Okka Nimisham"	Ramajogayya Sastry	G. V. Prakash Kumar	5:01
8.	"Horu Gali"	Rakendu Mouli	Revanth	0:34
9.	"Andani Aakaasam"	Vennelakanti	Saindhavi	3:18
Total length:				31:24

All lyrics are written by Aniruddha Sastry.

Soorarai Pottru - Kannada
No.	Title	Singer(s)	Length
1.	"Mannaki"	Aniruddha Sastry	3:51
2.	"Naguthalai"	Aniruddha Sastry	5:07
3.	"Kande Kande"	Sindoori	4:08
4.	"Usire"	Madhwesh Bharadwaj	3:58
5.	"Sundhara"	Shibukallar	0:39
6.	"Karshanabe"	Aniruddha Sastry	1:16
7.	"Aakasa"	Madhwesh Bharadwaj	4:50
Total length:			23:50

All lyrics are written by Sudamsu.

Soorarai Pottru - Malayalam
No.	Title	Singer(s)	Length
1.	"Yennevittupoyo"	Sarath Santhosh	3:51
2.	"Andhikku Koottu"	Sarath Santhosh	5:07
3.	"Nottam Kandal"	Sindhoori	4:08
4.	"Neelakasam"	Sarath Santhosh	4:50
5.	"Yevide"	Sarath Santhosh	3:58
6.	"Cheeripayum"	Shibukallar	0:39
7.	"Kalithullum"	Shibukallar	1:16
Total length:			23:51

== Awards ==
Award (Note: Awards, festivals and organizations are in alphabetical order.)	Date of ceremony (Note: Date is linked to the article about the awards held that year, wherever possible.)	Category	Recipient(s)	Result	Ref.
Blacksheep Digital Awards	28 February 2021	Sensational Music Director	G. V. Prakash Kumar	Won	
Cinema at Its Best Awards	30 December 2020	Best Original Score	G. V. Prakash Kumar	Nominated	
Edison Awards	6 March 2022	Best Music Director	G. V. Prakash Kumar	Nominated	
Edison Awards	6 March 2022	Best Lyricist	Snehan – (for "Kaattu Payale")	Won	
Edison Awards	6 March 2022	Best Playback Singer – Male	Harish Sivaramakrishnan – (for "Veyyon Silli")	Nominated	
Edison Awards	6 March 2022	Best Playback Singer – Female	Dhee – (for "Kaattu Payale")	Nominated	
Mirchi Music Awards South	20 March 2022	Album of The Year – Tamil	Soorarai Pottru	Nominated	
Mirchi Music Awards South	20 March 2022	Song of The Year – Tamil	"Kaattu Payale"	Nominated	
Mirchi Music Awards South	20 March 2022	Song of The Year – Tamil	"Veyyon Silli"	Nominated	
Mirchi Music Awards South	20 March 2022	Music Composer of The Year – Tamil	G. V. Prakash Kumar – ("Veyyon Silli")	Nominated	
Mirchi Music Awards South	20 March 2022	Lyricist of The Year – Tamil	Snehan – ("Kaattu Payale")	Nominated	
Mirchi Music Awards South	20 March 2022	Female Vocalist of The Year – Tamil	Dhee – (for "Kaattu Payale")	Nominated	
Mirchi Music Awards South	20 March 2022	Listeners Choice Album of The Year – Tamil	Soorarai Pottru	Won	
Mirchi Music Awards South	20 March 2022	Listeners Choice Song of The Year – Tamil	"Veyyon Silli"	Nominated	
Mirchi Music Awards South	20 March 2022	Best Sound Mixing – Tamil	Jehovahson Alghar	Won	
South Indian International Movie Awards	19 September 2021	Best Music Director – Tamil	G. V. Prakash Kumar	Won	
South Indian International Movie Awards	19 September 2021	Best Lyricist – Tamil	Vivek – (for "Veyyon Silli")	Nominated	
South Indian International Movie Awards	19 September 2021	Best Male Playback Singer – Tamil	Harish Sivaramakrishnan – (for "Veyyon Silli")	Won	
South Indian International Movie Awards	19 September 2021	Best Female Playback Singer – Tamil	Dhee – (for "Kaattu Payale")	Nominated	
South Indian International Movie Awards	19 September 2021	Best Female Playback Singer – Tamil	Saindhavi – (for "Kayilae Aagasam")	Nominated	
