= Vasundhara Das =

Indian actress and playback singer (born 1977)

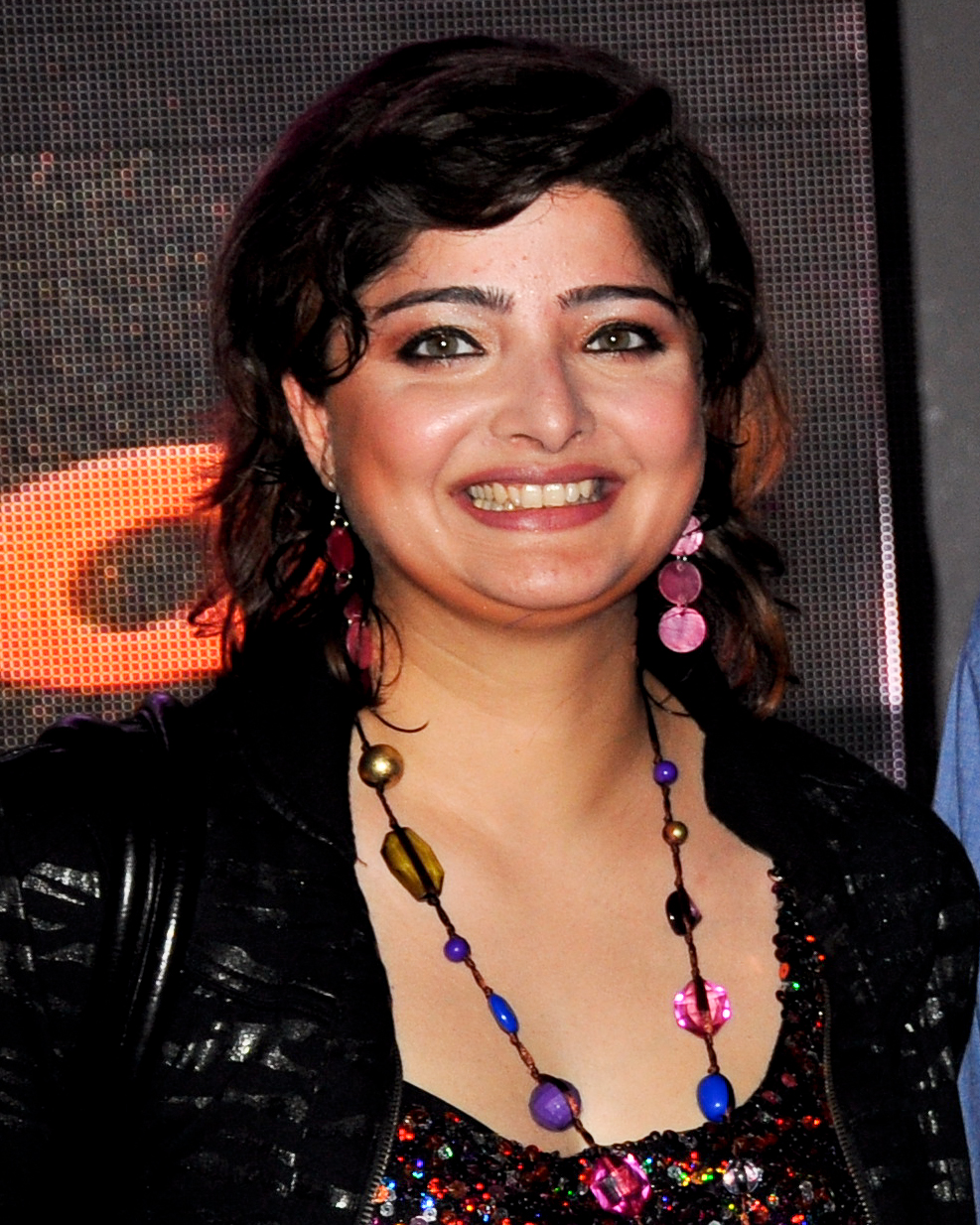
- Das in 2010
- Born: 27 October 1977 (age 48); Bangalore, Karnataka, India
- Education: Mount Carmel College, Bangalore
- Occupations: Playback singer, Actress
- Years active: 1998–2012
- Spouse: Roberto Narain (m. 2012)

Vasundhara Das (born 27 October 1977) is an Indian playback singer and former actress. Vasundhara's acting career includes Hey Ram (Tamil/Hindi), Monsoon Wedding (English), Citizen (Tamil), Ravana Prabhu (Malayalam), Lankesh Patrike (Kannada) and several others. She won the Filmfare Award for Best Female Playback Singer – Tamil for the song, "Shakalaka Baby" from the film Mudhalvan

== Early life ==
Vasundhara Das was born into a Hebbar Iyengar family in Bangalore, Karnataka, to Kishen Das and Nirmala Das. She was educated at Cluny Convent High School and at Sri Vidya Mandir in Bangalore. She thereafter studied at Mount Carmel College, Bangalore, where she graduated in Mathematics, Economics, and Statistics.

Vasundhara began training in Hindustani classical music at the age of six under her grandmother Indira Das, who ran a music school on the top of their house. She then joined the Lalit Kala Academy and later studied under Pandit Parameshwar Hegde, her guru. In her college days, she was a lead singer of a girl band and a soprano in the college choir. In an interview, she states that "I got booed off the first time I sang on stage." She speaks Tamil, Kannada, Telugu, English, Hindi, Malayalam, and Spanish.

In 2012, Vasundhara married her long-time friend, Roberto Narain, a drummer and percussionist.

== Career ==
=== Acting ===
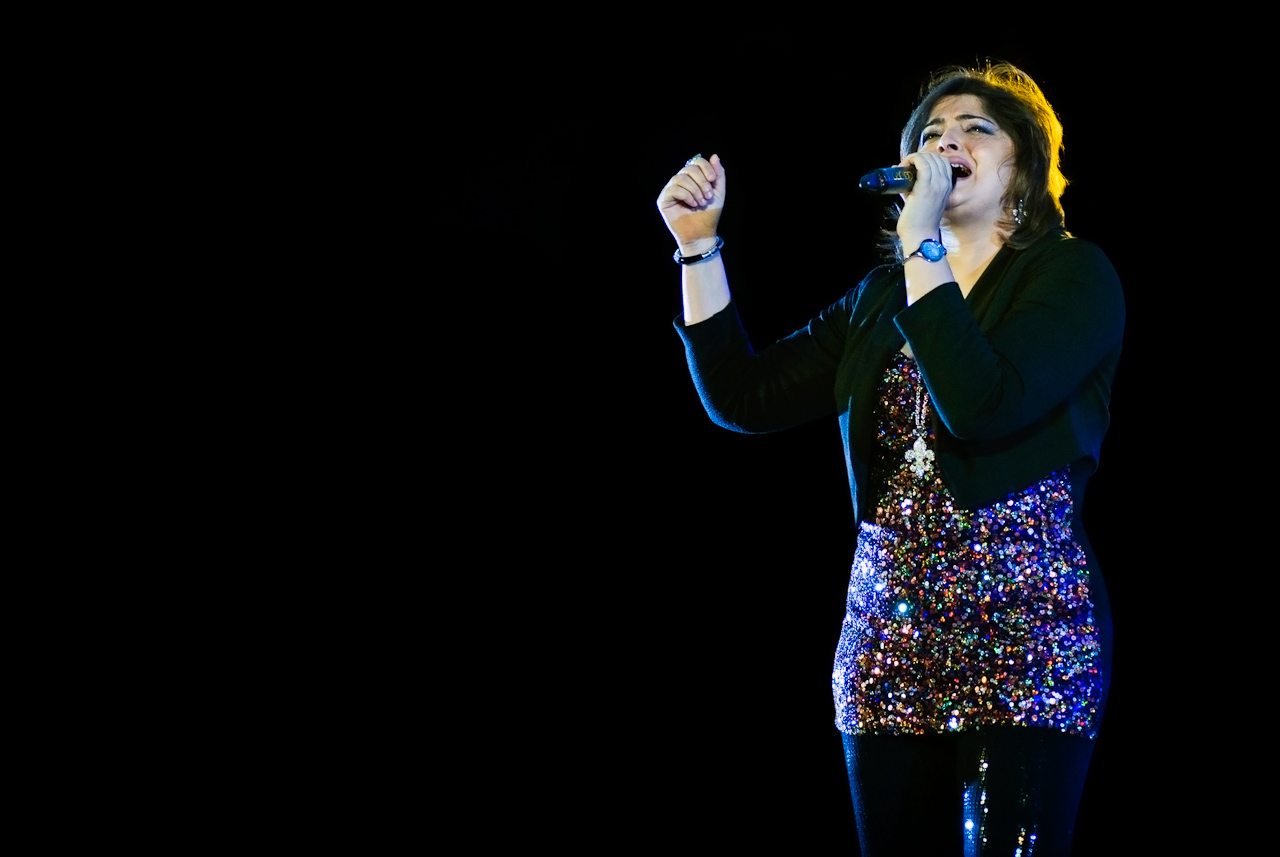
Das in a concert

In 1999, Vasundhara debuted as an actor with Kamal Haasan in the film Hey Ram though she started her career industry as a playback singer. She played the lead actress alongside Mohanlal in the Malayalam movie Raavanaprabhu (2001), with Ajith Kumar in the Tamil movie Citizen (2001) and with Darshan in the Kannada movie Lankesh Patrike. She also starred in Mira Nair's movie Monsoon Wedding (2001).

=== Music ===
She worked with playback singing career with A. R. Rahman's Tamil film Mudhalvan, for which she sang the song "Shakalaka Baby", which won her the Filmfare Award for Best Female Playback Singer – Tamil 2001. Later she worked with composers such as Vijaya Bhaskar, Yuvan Shankar Raja and G. V. Prakash Kumar. Her first film as a music composer was Paranthe Wali Gali (2014) along with Vikram Khajuria.

She was a founding member of Arya, a world music band that performed in Europe and America, and broke up in 2004. She has composed music at her Bangalore-based studio, The Active. She has also been involved in several independent projects such as Channel V Jammin', BBC's HIV awareness anthem for India "Har Kadam", Mission Ustaad, Global Rhythms, Nylon Soundz, and The Shah Hussain Project, a collaborative album with Sufi singer Mir Mukhtiyar Ali. She has a French single out in France called "L'ete Indien" in collaboration with Paris-based Agrumes Studio.

Vasundhara trained under the founder of drum jam, Arthur Hull in Hawaii. In 2013, she initiated an event, Community Drumjam at the MG Road metro station, Bangalore. It has since been run monthly by the Rangoli Metro Art Center, and Drumjam, a Western music company she co-founded and is running with her husband. They have conducted drum-jam programs at educational institutions and for communities of different age groups including children at risk, elderly with dementia and terminally-ill cancer patients. In 2016, she conducted a drum jam session for the India national cricket team for their team building exercise initiative.

== Filmography ==
=== Films ===
Year	Title	Role	Language	Notes/Ref.
2000	Hey Ram	Mythili Iyengar	Tamil/ Hindi	Debut feature film
2001	Monsoon Wedding	Aditi Verma	Hindi/English	
2001	Citizen	Indhu	Tamil	
2001	Ravanaprabhu	Mundackal Janaki Nambiyar	Malayalam	
2003	Lankesh Patrike	Preethi	Kannada	
2003	Film Star	Lila, An Inmate	Hindi	
2004	Vajram	Gemini	Malayalam	
2004	Pathar Bezubaan	Kalpana Varma	Hindi	
2006	Kudiyon Ka Hai Zamana	Natasha	Hindi	
2006	Corporate	Herself	Hindi	
2007	Ek Dastak	Akansha	Hindi	
2024	Gowri		Kannada	Special appearance

=== Television ===
Year	Title	Role	Notes/Ref.
2002	Channel V Jammin'	Performer	

== Discography ==
Year	Movie Title	Song Title	Composer	Language	Co-singer
1999	Mudhalvan; Oke Okkadu	"Shakalaka Baby"	A. R. Rahman	Tamil; Telugu (dubbed)	Pravin Mani
2000	Rhythm	"Ayyo Pathikichu"	A. R. Rahman	Tamil; Telugu (dubbed)	Udit Narayan
2000	Azad	"Sonare"	Mani Sharma	Telugu	Udit Narayan
2000	Kushi	"Kattipudi Kattipudida"	Deva	Tamil	Shankar Mahadevan
2000	Moodu Mukkalaata	"Prema Vikramarkudu"	M. M. Srilekha	Telugu	S. P. Balasubrahmanyam
2001	Neela	"Hejje Hejje Mathadu"	Vijaya Bhaskar	Kannada	Solo
2001	Neela	"Ee Nada Manninalli"	Vijaya Bhaskar	Kannada	Solo
2001	Citizen	"Pookari Pookari"	Deva	Tamil	Shankar Mahadevan
2001	Citizen	"I Like You"	Deva	Tamil	
2001	Little John	"Laila Laila"	Pravin Mani	Tamil	Pravin Mani
2001	Lagaan	"O Rey Chhori"	A. R. Rahman	Hindi	Udit Narayan, Alka Yagnik
2002	Adrustam	"Hollywood Handsome"	Dhina	Telugu	Karthik
2003	Lankesh Patrike	"Nodkond Baaro Andre"	Babji-Sandeep	Kannada	Babji
2003	Boys	"Sarigame"	A. R. Rahman	Tamil; Telugu (dubbed)	Lucky Ali
2003	Boys	"Dating"	A. R. Rahman	Tamil; Telugu (dubbed)	
2003	Missamma	"Ney Padithe Lokamey Padadha"	Vandemataram Srinivas	Telugu	
2003	Juniors	"Night Jorugunnadi"	Chakri	Telugu	Tippu
2003	Mee Intikosthe Yem Istharu Maa Intikosthe Yem Testharu	"Cienmallo Gani"	Ghantadi Krishna	Telugu	
2003	Kal Ho Naa Ho	"It's The Time To Disco"	Shankar–Ehsaan–Loy	Hindi	KK, Loy Mendonsa, Shaan, Sadhna Sargam
2004	Sye	"Sye"	M. M. Keeravani	Telugu	Kalyani Malik, Smita
2004	Sye	"Ganga AC"	M. M. Keeravani	Telugu	Kalyani Malik, Smita
2004	Manmadhan	"Thathai Thathai"	Yuvan Shankar Raja	Tamil	Silambarasan
2004	Manmadha	"Thathai Thathai"	Yuvan Shankar Raja	Telugu	Devi Sri Prasad
2004	Monalisa	"Kurrakaru Hero"	Valisha Babji	Kannada	Shankar Mahadevan
2004	Main Hoon Na	"Chale Jaise Hawaien"	Anu Malik	Hindi	KK
2004	Dhoom	"Salaame"	Pritam	Hindi	Kunal Ganjawala
2005	Anniyan; Aparichithudu; Aparichit	"Kannum Kannum" "Naaku Neeku Nokia" "Gora Gora Aankh"	Harris Jayaraj	Tamil; Telugu (dubbed); Hindi (dubbed)	Lesle Lewis, Andrea Jeremiah; Kunal Ganjawala; Lesle Lewis
2005	Anbe Aaruyire	"Maram Kothiye"	A.R. Rahman	Tamil	Shankar Mahadevan
2005	Kanda Naal Mudhal	"Erimalai Naane"	Yuvan Shankar Raja	Tamil	Shankar Mahadevan
2005	Salaam Namaste	"Salaam Namaste"	Vishal–Shekhar	Hindi	Kunal Ganjawala
2006	Happy	"I Hate You"	Yuvan Shankar Raja	Telugu	Ranjith
2006	Mayabazar	"Andulona Undi"	K. M. Radha Krishnan	Telugu	K. M. Radha Krishnan
2006	Hanumanthu	"Neevu Kottina"	Vandemataram Srinivas	Telugu	Naveen
2006	Kabhi Alvida Naa Kehna	"Where's The Party Tonight?"	Shankar–Ehsaan–Loy	Hindi	Joi Barua, Shaan
2006	Sarada Saradaga	"Yenno Janma Janmala"	S. V. Krishna Reddy	Telugu	Kunal Ganjawala
2007	Hudugaata	"Mandakiniye"	Jessie Gift	Kannada	Jessie Gift
2007	Vijayadasami	"Deepavali"	Srikanth Deva	Telugu	Naveen
2007	Sillunu Oru Kaadhal	"Machhakkari"	A. R. Rahman	Tamil	Shankar Mahadevan
2007	Jhoom Barabar Jhoom	"Kiss of Love"	Shankar–Ehsaan–Loy	Hindi	Vishal Dadlani
2008	Ullasamga Utsahamga	"Chakori"	G. V. Prakash Kumar	Kannada	Benny Dayal
2008	Nannusire	"Sanje Beachinalli"	Premji Amaren	Kannada	Premji Amaren
2012	Yamudiki Mogudu: Ee Nela Thakkuvodu	"Narottama Narottama"	Koti	Telugu	
