= Asuran (soundtrack) =

2019 soundtrack album by G. V. Prakash Kumar

- Soundtrack album cover

Soundtrack album by G. V. Prakash Kumar
- Released: 2 September 2019
- Recorded: 2019
- Genre: Feature film soundtrack
- Length: 28:20
- Language: Tamil
- Labels: Kalaippuli Audio; Divo
- Producer: G. V. Prakash Kumar

G. V. Prakash Kumar chronology
100% Kadhal (2019)	Asuran (2019)	Soorarai Pottru (2020)
External audio
- Audio Jukebox on YouTube

Asuran (transl. Demon) is the soundtrack album composed by G. V. Prakash Kumar for the 2019 Indian Tamil-language film of the same name written and directed by Vetrimaaran, which stars Dhanush and Manju Warrier. The soundtrack album which had seven songs written by Ekadesi, Yugabharathi, Eknath and Arunraja Kamaraj, was consisted to be a mix of raw folk elements with the approach of international music and had begun production during March 2019 and completed within that August. The soundtrack album was launched on 2 September 2019, at Prasad Studios in Chennai, with a simultaneous release through YouTube and digital platforms. The album received mostly positive reviews from critics and audience and fetched accolades at various ceremonies.

== Production ==
After collaborating with Santhosh Narayanan for Vada Chennai, Vetrimaaran was reported to collaborate with G. V. Prakash Kumar for this film during the official announcement in December 2018. The same was reported when Dhanush recorded one of the songs for Kumar's Jail, directed by Vasanthabalan, and the former suggested his name to Vetrimaaran. In January 2019, Vetrimaaran confirmed Prakash as the music director for the film, which was his third collaboration with the director after Polladhavan, Aadukalam and Visaranai. The film further marked Dhanush's collaboration with Prakash Kumar, eight years since his fallout with the composer during the production of Selvaraghavan's Mayakkam Enna.

In March 2019, Prakash tweeted that he had started working on the compositions of the film, after completing the Suriya-starrer Soorarai Pottru (2020), directed by Sudha Kongara. Within the end of the month, he had completed working on two dance numbers of the film. In June 2019, Prakash Kumar composed a peppy number (which was later deciphered as "Polladha Bhoomi"), with Dhanush, along with Ken Karunas and Teejay, who played Dhanush's sons in the film. In July, another song from the film was recorded during the production stage, which was named "Kathari Poovazhagi". The song was written by Ekadesi and crooned by Velmurugan, with female vocals being accompanied by Rajalakshmi and Napolia. Both the singer and composer worked in the song "Otha Sollala" for the film Aadukalam also composed by Prakash.

According to Prakash, the music of the film is dominated with raw folk and earthy elements, but the approach was international. He added that "the thought process was about mixing folk and world music; the voices will be folk, but the instrumentation will have an international flavor, like using an electric guitar with this raw folk. I have treated it like a Coke Studio project and will be exciting for fans and listeners."

== Release ==
The official track list of the film featured seven songs in the film, while composer G. V. Prakash initially revealed that there are four songs in the album. The album eventually had a reprised and an alternate version of a tune he had composed. On the occasion of Ganesh Chaturthi (2 September 2019), the makers unveiled the soundtrack album at a launch event held in Prasad Studios, Chennai. The event saw the attendance of the cast members, Dhanush, Manju Warrier, Ammu Abirami, Ken Karunas, singer-turned-actor Teejay Arunachalam director Vetrimaaran, composer G. V. Prakash Kumar, and producer S. Thanu amongst other press and media. In addition to the soundtrack release, the album was unveiled on streaming platform Gaana and in YouTube, the same day. The track "Polladha Bhoomi" was not featured in the film.

== Reception ==
The film's music, including the background score, received positive responses from both audiences as well as critics, with songs "Kathari Poovazhagi", "Yen Minukki" and "Ellu Vaya Pookalaye" topped the charts and received the most consumer response, benefiting to the success of the film. A reviewer from Moviecrow rated 3.5 out of 5 to the soundtrack stating "Vetri Maaran's, Asuran's soundtrack composed by G. V. Prakash, is intense, cinematic and drives the listener to witness the rawness of the lands and times where the story is set in!" Siddharth K of Sify added that "The album was rustic tonally and added so much depth to the raw nature of the film". Film websites like Sify and A Humming Heart listed the albums in the first position, and the song "Kathari Poovazhagi" was listed in the Top 15 Tamil Songs of 2019 by The Times of India.

== Track listing ==
No.	Title	Lyrics	Singer (s)	Length
1.	"Kathari Poovazhagi"	Ekadesi	Velmurugan, Rajalakshmi, Napolia	3:45
2.	"Polladha Bhoomi"	Yugabharathi	Dhanush, G. V. Prakash Kumar, Ken Karunas, Teejay Arunachalam	3:58
3.	"Yen Minukki"	Eknath	Chinmayi, Teejay Arunasalam	4:32
4.	"Blood Bath"	Arunraja Kamaraj	Arunraja Kamaraj	4:02
5.	"Ellu Vaya Pookalaye"	Yugabharathi	Saindhavi	5.58
6.	"Yen Minukki" (Reprise)	Eknath	Chinmayi, G. V. Prakash Kumar	4:32
7.	"Kannazhagu Raththinamey"	Yugabharathi	Dhanush	1:38
Total length:				28:20

== Background score ==
G. V. Prakash Kumar started composing for the background score for Asuran during August 2019, and was completed within eight days. His work in the background score was praised by the critics and audiences, along with the audio engineer T. Udayakumar, who worked on the final mix for the score. The original soundtrack was released on 16 November 2019, for music streaming and download.

Indiaglitz said that "GV Prakash's background score elevates many sequences, and builds the momentum in tense episodes". A critic from Sify too wrote that "the BGM haunts you even after you leave the hall". Sreedhar Pillai wrote for Firstpost that Prakash's score is "one of his best works in recent times" and "perfect as per the mood of the film". Bharath Vijayakumar of Moviecrow stated that "Prakash Kumar's intense score keeps your adrenaline pumping". In the film review for The News Minute, critic Sowmya Rajendran wrote that "GV Prakash's rousing background score makes the sequences all the more impressive".

== Awards and nominations ==
Award (Note: Awards, festivals and organizations are in alphabetical order.)	Date of ceremony (Note: Date is linked to the article about the awards held that year, wherever possible.)	Category	Recipient(s) and nominee(s)	Result	Ref.
Ananda Vikatan Cinema Awards	11 January 2020	Best Female Playback Singer	Saindhavi for "Ellu Vaya Pookalaye"	Won	
Ananda Vikatan Cinema Awards	11 January 2020	Best Lyricist	Yugabharathi for "Ellu Vaya Pookalaye"	Won	
Norway Tamil Film Festival Awards	15 January 2020	Best Female Playback Singer	Saindhavi for "Ellu Vaya Pookalaye"	Won	
Osaka Tamil International Film Festival Awards	31 March 2021	Best Music Director	G. V. Prakash Kumar	Won	
South Indian International Movie Awards	18 September 2021	Best Music Director – Tamil	G. V. Prakash Kumar	Nominated	
South Indian International Movie Awards	18 September 2021	Best Lyricist – Tamil	Yugabharathi for "Ellu Vaya Pookalaye"	Nominated	
South Indian International Movie Awards	18 September 2021	Best Male Playback Singer – Tamil	Velmurugan for "Kathari Poovazhagi"	Nominated	
South Indian International Movie Awards	18 September 2021	Best Female Playback Singer – Tamil	Saindhavi for "Ellu Vaya Pookalaye"	Won	
Zee Cine Awards Tamil	4 January 2020	Best Background Score	G. V. Prakash Kumar	Won	
Zee Cine Awards Tamil	4 January 2020	Best Female Playback Singer	Saindhavi for "Ellu Vaya Pookalaye"	Nominated	
