= Filmfare Award for Best Female Playback Singer – Tamil =

Indian film award

| Superlative | Singer | Record |
|---|---|---|
| Most wins | Chinmayi | 3 |
| Most wins | Shweta Mohan | 3 |
| Most nominations | Shreya Ghoshal | 9 |
| Most nominations without a win | Saindhavi | 4 |
| Most consecutive nominations | Chinmayi | 4 |
| Most consecutive nominations | Shweta Mohan | 4 |
| Most consecutive wins | Shweta Mohan | 2 |
| Youngest winner | Uthara Unnikrishnan | 10 |
| Youngest nominee | Uthara Unnikrishnan | 10 |
| Oldest winner | Sadhana Sargam | 38 |
| Oldest nominee | K. S. Chithra | 61 |

== Multiple wins ==
| Singer | Record |
|---|---|
| Chinmayi Sripada | 3 |
| Shweta Mohan | 3 |
| Shreya Ghoshal | 2 |

== Multiple nominations ==
| Singer | Number of Nominations |
|---|---|
| Shreya Ghoshal | 10 |
| Shweta Mohan | 7 |
| Chinmayi Sripada | 6 |
| Sadhana Sargam | 7 |
| Saindhavi | 4 |
| Shakthisree Gopalan | 3 |
| Neeti Mohan | 3 |
| Suchitra | 3 |
| Shashaa Tirupati | 3 |
| Dhee | 2 |
| K. S. Chitra | 2 |
| Jonita Gandhi | 2 |
| Andrea Jeremiah | 2 |
| Bombay Jayashri | 2 |
| Vandana Srinivasan | 2 |
| Shruti Haasan | 2 |

== Winners ==
| Year | Singer | Film | Song |
|---|---|---|---|
| 2024 | Shweta Mohan | Amaran | "Hey Minnale" |
| 2023 | Karthika Vaidyanathan | Chithha | "Kangal Edho" |
| 2022 | Antara Nandy | Ponniyin Selvan: I | "Alaikadal" |
| 2020–2021 | Dhee | Soorarai Pottru | "Kaattu Payale" |
| 2019 | AWARDS FUNCTION WAS SUSPENDED DUE TO COVID-19 PANDEMIC | | |
| 2018 | Chinmayi | 96 | "Kaathale Kaathale" |
| 2017 | Shashaa Tirupati | Kaatru Veliyidai | "Vaan Varuvan" |
| 2016 | Shweta Mohan | Kabali | "Maaya Nadhi" |
| 2015 | Shweta Mohan | Thanga Magan | "Enna Solla" |
| 2014 | Uthara Unnikrishnan | Saivam | "Azhagu" |
| 2013 | Shakthisree Gopalan | Kadal | "Nenjukullea" |
| 2012 | NSK Ramya | Neethaane En Ponvasantham | "Satru Munbu" |
| 2011 | Chinmayi | Vaagai Sooda Vaa | "Sara Sara" |
| 2010 | Shreya Ghoshal | Angadi Theru | "Un Perai Sollum" |
| 2009 | Chinmayi | Aadhavan | "Vaarayo Vaarayo" |
| 2008 | Deepa Miriam | Subramaniyapuram | "Kangal Irandal" |
| 2007 | Sadhana Sargam | Kireedam | "Akkam Pakkam" |
| 2006 | Shreya Ghoshal | Sillunu Oru Kadhal | "Munbe Vaa" |
| 2005 | Binny Krishnakumar | Chandramukhi | "Raa Raa" |
| 2002 (Note: Between the introduction of an award for playback singing in 1997 and 2005, awards were not consistently provided every year and a single award was made available for both male and female singers for all the four South Indian languages.) | Anuradha Sriram | Gemini | "Nenju Thudikkuthu" |
| 2001 | Bombay Jayashri | Minnale | "Vaseegara" |
| 1999 | Vasundhara Das | Mudhalvan | "Shakalaka Baby" |

== Nominations ==
The nominees were announced publicly only from 2009. The list along with winners:

=== 2000s ===
2008: Deepa Miriam – "Kangal Irandal" from Subramaniyapuram

- Bombay Jayashri – "Yaaro Manadhile" from Dhaam Dhoom
- Sadhana Sargam – "Mukundha Mukundha" from Dasavathaaram
- Shreya Ghoshal – "Then Then" from Kuruvi
- Shweta Mohan – "Kanden Kanden" from Pirivom Santhippom

2009: Chinmayi – "Vaarayo Vaarayo" from Aadhavan

- Harini – "Hasile Fisile" from Aadhavan
- Rita – "Allegra" from Kanthasamy
- Shreya Ghoshal – "Oru Vetkam" from Pasanga
- Suchitra – "Oru Chinna Thamarai" from Vettaikaran

=== 2010s ===
2010: Shreya Ghoshal – "Un Perai Sollum" from Angaadi Theru

- Andrea Jeremiah and Aishwarya Dhanush – "Unmele Aasadhan" from Aayirathil Oruvan
- Chinmayi – "Kilimanjaro" from Enthiran
- Saindhavi – "Adadaa Mazhadaa" from Paiyaa
- Suchitra – "En Idhayam" from Singam

2011: Chinmayi – "Sara Sara" from Vaagai Sooda Vaa

- Shweta Mohan – "Nee Koorinaal" from 180
- Madhushree – "Un Perai Theriyaadhu" from Engaeyum Eppothum
- Saindhavi – "Vizhigalil Oru" from Deiva Thirumagal
- Neha Bhasin – "Poraane Poraane" from Vaagai Sooda Vaa

2012: NSK Ramya – "Satru Munbu" from Neethaane En Ponvasantham

- Shruthi Haasan – "Kannazhagaa" from 3
- Andrea Jeremiah – "Google Google" from Thuppakki
- Shreya Ghoshal – "Sollitaley" from Kumki
- Chinmayi – "Asku Laska" from Nanban

2013: Shakthisree Gopalan – "Nenjukulle" from Kadal

- Saindhavi – "Yaar Indha Saalai Oram" from Thalaivaa
- Saindhavi – "Yaaro Ivan" from Udhayam NH4
- Suchitra – "Ailasa Ailasa" from Vanakkam Chennai
- Vandana Srinivasan – "Avatha Paiyya" from Paradesi

2014: Uthara Unnikrishnan – "Azhagu" from Saivam

- Bhavya Pandit – "Ovvondrai Thirudigarai" from Jeeva
- Shakthisree Gopalan and Dhee – "Naan Nee" from Madras
- Shweta Mohan – "Yaarumilla" from Kaaviya Thalaivan
- Vandana Srinivasan – "Unnai Ippa" from Kayal

2015: Shweta Mohan – "Enna Solla" from Thanga Magan

- Kharesma Ravichandran – "Kadhal Cricket" from Thani Oruvan
- Neeti Mohan – "Neeyum Naanum" from Naanum Rowdy Dhaan
- Shreya Ghoshal – "Pookkale Sattru" from I
- Shruti Haasan – "Yeandi Yeandi" from Puli

2016: Shweta Mohan – "Maya Nadhi" from Kabali

- Chinmayi – "Naan Un" from 24
- K. S. Chithra – "Konji Pesida Venam" from Sethupathi
- Mahalakshmi Iyer – "Un Maele Oru Kannu" from Rajini Murugan
- Neeti Mohan – "Chella Kutti" from Theri

2017: Shashaa Tirupati – "Vaan Varuvaan" from Kaatru Veliyidai

- Luksimi Sivaneswaralingam – "Senthoora" from Bogan
- Neeti Mohan – "Idhayame" from Velaikkaran
- Shreya Ghoshal – "Neethane" from Mersal
- Shweta Mohan – "Macho" from Mersal

2018: Chinmayi – "Kaathale Kathale" from 96

- Dhee – "Rowdy Baby" from Maari 2
- Jonita Gandhi – "Omg Ponnu" from Sarkar
- Shakthisree Gopalan – "Bhoomi Bhoomi" from Chekka Chivantha Vaanam
- Shashaa Tirupati – "Endhira Logathu" from 2.0

=== 2020s ===
2020–2021: Dhee – "Kaattu Payale" from Soorarai Pottru

- Jonita Gandhi – "Chellama" from Doctor
- K. S. Chithra – "Thangam Thangam" from Annaatthe
- Kidakkuzhi Mariyammal – "Kandaa Vara Sollunga" from Karnan
- Shashaa Tirupati – "Bodhai Kaname" from Oh Manapenne!

2022: Antara Nandy – "Alaikadal" from Ponniyin Selvan: I

- Chinmayi – "Panithuli" from Raangi
- Jonita Gandhi – "Arabic Kuthu" from Beast
- Madhushree – "Mallipoo" from Vendhu Thanindhathu Kaadu
- Shreya Ghoshal – "Maayava Thooyava" from Iravin Nizhal
- Shreya Ghoshal – "Unna Nenachadhum" from Vendhu Thanindhathu Kaadu

2023: Karthika Vaidyanathan – "Kangal Edho" from Chithha

- K. S. Chithra and Harini – "Veera Raja Veera" from Ponniyin Selvan: II
- Shakthisree Gopalan – "Aga Naga" from Ponniyin Selvan: II
- Shakthisree Gopalan – "Nenjame Nenjame" from Maamannan
- Shilpa Rao – "Kaavaalaa" from Jailer

2024: Shweta Mohan – "Hey Minnale" from Amaran

- Ananya Bhat – "Manasula" from Viduthalai 2
- Dhee – "Thenkizhakku" from Vaazhai
- Ganavya – "Oh Raaya" from Raayan
- Sakthisree Gopalan – "Thaensudare" from Lover

== See also ==
- List of music awards honoring women
