= Veyyon Silli =

2020 song from Soorarai Pottru

Single by G. V. Prakash Kumar (Composer) and Harish Sivaramakrishnan (Singer)

from the album Soorarai Pottru
- Language: Tamil
- Released: 13 February 2020
- Recorded: October 2019
- Studio: Divine Labs, Chennai
- Genre: Melody, Indian folk, progressive rock
- Length: 5:04
- Label: Sony Music
- Composer: G. V. Prakash Kumar
- Lyricist: Vivek
- Producer: G. V. Prakash Kumar

Soorarai Pottru track listing
- 1. "Mannurunda"; 2. "Veyyon Silli"; 3. "Kaattu Payale"; 4. "Sooravalli"; 5. "Naalu Nimisham"; 6. "Aagasam"; 7. "Maara Theme"; 8. "Usurey"; 9. "Kaiyiley Aagasam" (bonus track)

Music video
- "Veyyon Silli" on YouTube

"Veyyon Silli" (transl. A piece in the sun) is the 2020 Tamil-language song featured in the soundtrack of the Tamil film Soorarai Pottru. Directed by Sudha Kongara, and produced by Suriya under his 2D Entertainment banner, starring himself in the lead role. The song is composed by G. V. Prakash Kumar, and sung by Harish Sivaramakrishnan and written by Vivek. It is a fusion of melody, folk and progressive rock, and was picturised on Suriya and Aparna Balamurali. The track was launched on 13 February 2020 at a special Boeing 737 aircraft flying on mid-air, the first time in Tamil cinema to do so.

== Development ==
The recording of the song took place during October 2019, with Harish Sivaramakrishnan, playback singer and frontman of the Bangalore-based contemporary Carnatic progressive rock band Agam, sung the track. According to Prakash, it is a melody number fused with Indian folk and progressive rock, that renders a "new genre in sounding". The track was written by Vivek, in his maiden collaboration with Suriya, and was the first song he had written for the film. According to Vivek, the title "Veyyon Silli" served as a colloquial meaning to "suriyanin thundu" (a piece of the sun), where "Veyyon" means it as 'sun' and is considered to be "a beautiful word in the Tamil literature". In an interview with Avinash Ramachandran of The New Indian Express, Vivek had said that "when a song is featured in a film that has such a big star like Suriya, people will surely pay more attention to the lyrics".

== Release and reception ==
The song was released on 13 February 2020, coinciding the eve of Valentine's Day. The release coincided with a special launching ceremony that was held at Chennai International Airport where the team planned to launch the single inside the Boeing 737 aircraft flying on mid-air, which is the first in Tamil cinema, to hold a film's song launch during mid-air flight. The team collaborated with SpiceJet as the official aviation partner and had launched a special Boeing 737 passenger jet with the film's poster being branded on it. 100 first-time fliers including 70 school children are invited to the single track launch which was held during mid-air flight. The song was simultaneously launched on all streaming platforms, the same day, along with the Telugu-version of the track "Pilla Puli".

Antara Chakraborty of The Indian Express called the song as "an earworm as the beats are catchy". Critic-based at Behindwoods called it as an "enjoyable track" similar to "Othayadi Pathayile" from Kanaa (2018) and said "The song is well composed as it clearly makes you want to get from your sedentary position and tap your foot. The song has a rural background in its instrumental arrangement in the second layer if you pay attention and also employs good percussion to suit the current trends." Vipin Nair of Music Aloud chose "Veyyon Silli" as one of his favourite picks and stated it as "the track has smattering of rock elements in it as well, making for a heady combo". Karthik Srinivasan of Milliblog in his weekly review, wrote "GVP gets many things perfectly right in the song. His own captivating tune and the jaunty rhythms is one. Vivek's lyrics, full of interesting wordplay is another. The best part is the choice of Agam's lead singer, Harish Sivaramakrishnan. Harish is stunningly good in his rendition of this high-pitched melody."

== Commercial performance ==
For the digital news platform The News Minute, Anjana Shekar listed the song, along with "Kaattu Payale" (another track from the film) in the year-ender review 7 Tamil Songs That Needed in Your Playlist. Spotify chose "Veyyon Silli" and five other tracks from the film's album in their Top Tamil Tracks of 2020. It was the most streamed Tamil song on JioSaavn in 2020. As of February 2022, the song garnered about 66 million views, with the lyrical version gained more views (41 million views) than the video song.

== Credits and personnel ==
Credits adapted from YouTube.

- G. V. Prakash Kumar – composer
- Harish Sivaramakrishnan – playback singer
- Vivek – lyrics
- Rajkumar Amal – music producer
- Balaji – solo violin
- KC Balasarangan – backing vocals
- Sarath Santhosh – backing vocals
- Ala B Bala – backing vocals
- Sanjay Chandrashekhar – recording and supervision (Divine Labs, Chennai)
- Jehovahson Alghar – mixing and mastering (Divine Labs, Chennai)
- Shadab Rayeen – iTunes mastering (New Edge Studios, Mumbai)
- Abhishek Sortey – mastering assistance
- Dhanunjey Kapekar – mastering assistance

== Track listings ==
Original
No.	Title	Lyrics	Performer(s)	Length
1.	"Veyyon Silli"	Vivek	Harish Sivaramakrishnan	5:04

Telugu
No.	Title	Lyrics	Performer(s)	Length
1.	"Pilla Puli"	Ramajogayya Sastry	Anurag Kulkarni	5:03

Kannada
No.	Title	Lyrics	Performer(s)	Length
1.	"Naguthalai"	Anirudh Sastry	Anirudh Sastry	5:07

Malayalam
No.	Title	Lyrics	Performer(s)	Length
1.	"Andhikku Koottu"	Sudamsu	Sarath Santhosh	5:07

== Accolades ==
Award (Note: Awards, festivals and organizations are in alphabetical order.)	Date of ceremony (Note: Date is linked to the article about the awards held that year, wherever possible.)	Category	Recipient(s)	Result	Ref.
South Indian International Movie Awards	19 September 2021	Best Music Director – Tamil	G. V. Prakash Kumar	Won	
South Indian International Movie Awards	19 September 2021	Best Lyricist – Tamil	Vivek	Nominated	
South Indian International Movie Awards	19 September 2021	Best Male Playback Singer – Tamil	Harish Sivaramakrishnan	Won	
