= Lankesh Patrike (film) =

- VCD cover
- Directed by: Indrajit Lankesh
- Written by: Indrajit Lankesh; B. A. Madhu
- Produced by: K. Manju
- Starring: Darshan; Vasundhara Das
- Cinematography: Sundarnath Suvarna
- Edited by: B.S. Kemparaju
- Music by: Babji-Sandeep
- Production companies: Lakshmishree Combines; Aishwarya Combines
- Release date: 30 April 2003
- Country: India
- Language: Kannada

Lankesh Patrike is a 2003 Indian Kannada-language political thriller film directed by Indrajit Lankesh and starring Darshan as a journalist and Vasundhara Das in her Kannada acting debut. Despite releasing to positive critical reception, the film was a box office failure.

== Cast ==
- Darshan as Indra
- Vasundhara Das as Preeti
- Ananth Nag as Lankesh
- Devaraj as ACP Ramu
- Loknath
- Chitra Shenoy
- Arun Sagar
- Sanketh Kashi
- Rangayana Raghu as the CM
- Renuka Prasad
- Rajashekar Naidu
- H. G. Dattatreya
- Venkatachala
- Jaikumar
- Rajesh
- Neenasam Ashwath
- Master Samrat
- Surya
- Kannada Krishna
- Indris
- Kodaman Chandru
- Anupama Gowda

Cameo appearance

- Aditi Govitrikar (in the song "Sweetu Rasagolla")
- Indrajit Lankesh as the CM's killer

== Soundtrack ==
The music of the film was composed by Babji-Sandeep and lyrics written by K. Kalyan, Sri Ranga and Dodda Rangegowda.

Track listing
No.	Title	Singer(s)	Length
1.	"Nodkondu Baaro"	Vasundhara Das, Babji	5:12
2.	"Endo Kanda Kanasu"	Rajesh Krishnan, Kavita Krishnamurthy	5:48
3.	"Sweetu Rasagolla"	Kalpana Patowary	4:30
4.	"Jumma Jumma"	Babji, Lakshmi	1:39
5.	"Bum Bum Bombattu"	Hemanth	2:57
6.	"Yendu Naanu"	Sonu Nigam, Sowmya Raoh	5:45
7.	"Kunjarada Gombe"	Manjula Gururaj, Hemanth	4:30
Total length:			30:24

== Reception ==
A critic from Viggy wrote that "Overall, Lankesh Patrike is a typical commercial film with fantasy coated realism". India Info wrote "Indrajeet knows very well that just this storyline wont work. For this very reason, he has brought in glamour doll, Vasundara Das. Some masala scenes and of course some songs shot in posh locations. It has the elements but the very base of the film is hollow".

== Awards ==
- Karnataka State Film Award for Best Editor - B. Kemparaju
