= Subramaniapuram =

2008 Indian action drama film

- Theatrical release poster
- Directed by: Sasikumar
- Written by: Sasikumar
- Produced by: Sasikumar
- Starring: Jai; Swathi; Sasikumar; Ganja Karuppu; Samuthirakani
- Cinematography: S. R. Kathir
- Edited by: Raja Mohammad
- Music by: James Vasanthan
- Production company: Company Productions
- Release date: 4 July 2008
- Running time: 147 minutes
- Country: India
- Language: Tamil

Subramaniapuram is a 2008 Indian Tamil-language period action drama film written, produced, and directed by Sasikumar in his directorial debut. The film stars Jai, Swathi, Sasikumar himself, Ganja Karuppu and Samuthirakani. It follows a group of unemployed friends who get embroiled in a cycle of violence, betrayal and vengeance.

The music was composed by debutant James Vasanthan, with cinematography by S. R. Kathir and editing by Raja Mohammad. It was released on 4 July 2008 and became one of the biggest commercial successes of the year. It received 8 nominations at the 56th Filmfare Awards South and won three, including Best Tamil Film and Best Tamil Director. The film was dubbed into Telugu as Ananthapuram 1980, and remade in Kannada as Prem Adda (2012).

== Plot ==
In Madurai in 2008, a convict is released from prison after serving 27 years. Just then, an unknown person stabs him outside the prison gates. A flashback to 1980 reveals the events that led to the stabbing.

Azhagar, Paraman, Kasi, Dopa, and Dumka are unemployed close friends in Subramaniapuram, Madurai. They pass their time drinking liquor, smoking cigarettes, and fooling around on the streets with Chitthan opposite the house of an ex-councillor Somu and his brother Kanagu. Apart from them, the family consists of Somu's wife, their three children, including Thulasi and her two younger brothers, and Somu's elder brother Chidambaram and his wife.

The five friends, particularly Paraman and Azhagar (and on one occasion Kasi and Dopa), often end up in prison due to frequent fighting. Every time the police arrest them, Kanagu and Somu bail them out immediately. In the meantime, Azhagu and Thulasi develop mutual feelings for each other. Paraman is against his friend developing feelings for Thulasi(though he later comes to accept it), and Azhagar, not heeding his friend's thoughts, begins a relationship with her.

There are signs of things to come when a local temple's committee, especially the head Mokkaswamy (who later gets beaten up by Kasi and Dopa over a petty grievance at the annual festival), does not select Somu for a function. Things suddenly turn for the worse when Somu fails to get people to elect him for his party's (Tamil Nadu's ruling party at the time) district chief post, and his wife ridicules him for being jobless. Kanagu locks himself up in a lodge and drinks all day. He makes sure his friends hear about him and come to visit. He requests that they murder Palaniswamy, who was the person chosen for the post. Azhagar, Paraman, and Kasi hatch a plan and execute the person almost perfectly, with Azhagar striking the final blow with his knife. They run away, leaving a bicycle behind, leading the police to discover Paraman and Azhagar being responsible.

Azhagar and Paraman surrender themselves, hoping Kanagu will bail them out soon. However, they are shocked upon learning from Kasi that Somu was selected for the district chief post and is avoiding their contact. They confront reality and stay helpless in jail, where they befriend a fellow inmate, Ravi. He learns about their situation and bails them out. After their release, Azhagar and Paraman break into Kanagu's house to take revenge but stop when they find Thulasi crying. Azhagar later reconciles with Thulasi, and they continue to meet.

Ravi expects a favour from the gang: to kill his brother-in-law Munish for murdering his sister. When Paraman accomplishes the task with the help of Azhagar, an impressed Ravi gives the trio of Kasi, Paraman and Azhagar additional weapons to kill Kanagu. In the meantime, Chidambaram learns about Azhagar and Thulasi's relationship and tries to convince Thulasi to end it. Munish's men attempt to kill Azhagar and Kasi to avenge their boss's death, but they fail. Azhagar and Paraman strike back, killing those men later in the day with their knives. After a failed hit on Kanagu from Azhagar which results in Chidambaram getting wounded grievously with Azhagar managing to escape with Paraman's help, Kanagu, having learnt about Azhagar and Thulasi's relationship from Chidambaram, convinces the unwilling Thulasi to betray Azhagar.

Kanagu sets a trap for Azhagar using the grieving Thulasi as bait and has his men kill him, as Azhagar does not expect Thulasi to betray him. The next day, Kanagu informs Chidambaram, who is still recovering from his wounds, of what had happened. Paraman, who was waiting in an auto patiently, pulls Kanagu in and beheads him in revenge with his knife. He then lays his head at Azhagar's murder site and reflects on his friendship with Azhagar. Later, Paraman reminds Kasi about Azhagar, how they ruined their lives due to their delinquency and how he killed Kanagu. Going mad, he adds that he will kill the rest of the men in his family, during which he sees Somu's henchmen rushing behind Kasi. Kasi betrays Paraman in exchange for money from Somu by taking his knife away and leaving him at the mercy of the henchmen, who kill him.

In the present, Kasi is revealed as the stabbed convict. He lies in the hospital in critical condition, with a policeman trying to interrogate him over the assailant's possible motivation. The doctor asks him to wait until Kasi regains consciousness and escorts him out. Just then, Dumka comes in and awakens Kasi. He reveals that Dopa was the assailant and reminds him about Azhagar and Paraman. He then kills Kasi by removing his oxygen mask as revenge for his betrayal and walks away.

== Cast ==
- Jai as Azhagar
- Swathi as Thulasi
- Sasikumar as Paraman
- Ganja Karuppu as Kasi
- Samuthirakani as Kanagu
- Maari as Dumka
- Vichithran as Dopa
- K. G. Mohan as Chiththan
- Ilaikkadai Murugan as Mokkasamy
- Dhanam as Rasathi
- Rail Ravi as the doctor
- Kaajal Pasupathi as a dancer in the song "Madurai Kulangu"

== Production ==
=== Development ===
The idea to make a period film occurred to Sasikumar when he was assisting Ameer on Raam (2005). During the initial phases of Ameer's Paruthiveeran (2007), Sasikumar began groundwork for his directorial debut that would later become Subramaniapuram and left Paruthiveeran to focus on his film. Sasikumar started collecting old photographs, banners and boards of shops to imitate the style of writing from that period and also searched the Internet extensively for photographs of the 1980s. He especially researched photographs of wedding processions along the streets for a clear picture of how the roads looked and the kind of vehicles in use. The team relied on this visual information to construct the sets for the film. The film was initially expected to be produced by Ameer, but he did not remain; it was instead produced by Sasikumar himself via Company Productions, photographed by S. R. Kathir and edited by Raja Mohammad.

=== Casting and filming ===
Shanthanu Bhagyaraj was initially approached to play the lead role but was already committed to Sakkarakatti (2008). Sasikumar was unable to wait for Sakkarakatti's release as he had loans to pay and moved ahead without Shanthanu. Jai was then selected after Sasikumar had seen him at Deva's residence and Jai signed up for the film without hearing the script under the basis that it was to be produced by Ameer. Sasikumar wanted Swathi as the lead actress after he saw her in the Telugu film Aadavari Matalaku Arthale Verule (2007) and she accepted after initial reluctance. It is her Tamil debut. Chandini Tamilarasan later revealed that she was the original choice for Swathi's role. Maari was cast after the makers saw him in a photograph and asked him to audition, making his acting debut. Though the story is set in Subramaniapuram, the film was not actually shot there as it had substantially changed since the 1980s; instead, the film was shot in Dindigul and Chinnalapatti.

== Themes and analysis ==
A writer for Jump Cut described Subramaniapuram as an example of "New wave" Tamil cinema which revisits the "historical conjunctures" of the "Angry Young Man" (AYM) trope of Indian films. However, he noted that, unlike other AYM films, it does not blame the system for problems; rather it is the main characters, a group of wayward friends in Subramaniapuram who act impulsively, thus "engineer[ing] their own doom".

== Music ==
The music of Subramaniapuram was composed by James Vasanthan, in his film debut. Sasikumar spoke of his apprehension to approach an established composer as he was a debut director himself: "I was not sure whether they would listen to me and give me what I wanted". It was initially planned for the film to have no songs, only background score, but Vasanthan persuaded Sasikumar to reconsider. Vasanthan had previously been Sasikumar's music teacher at school.

The song "Kangal Irandal" is set in Reetigowla, a Carnatic raga. Vasanthan composed all the songs in his home. Sasikumar revealed that for the song "Kadhal Siluvayil", Vasanthan composed "almost 15 tunes" before Sasikumar was satisfied, and this song was recorded by singer Shankar Mahadevan within 30 minutes. Vasanthan chose Benny Dayal to sing the song "Theneeril Snegitham" after watching his performance at a cultural festival. The song was composed only as a promotional song, and does not feature in the film. Sasikumar described it as the first Tamil film song used exclusively for promotion.

Track listing
| No. | Title | Lyrics | Singer(s) | Length |
|---|---|---|---|---|
| 1. | "Kangal Irandal" | Thamarai | Bellie Raj, Deepa Miriam | 5:22 |
| 2. | "Madura Kulunga" | Yugabharathi | Velmurugan, Surmukhi Raman | 6:49 |
| 3. | "Kadhal Siluvayil" | Yugabharathi | Shankar Mahadevan | 5:39 |
| 4. | "Subramaniapuram Theme" (instrumental) | — | — | 3:25 |
| 5. | "Theneeril Snegitham" | Yugabharathi | Benny Dayal | 4:08 |
| 6. | "Subramaniapuram Love Theme" (instrumental) | — | — | 2:37 |
| Total length: | | | | 28:00 |

== Release ==
Before Subramaniapuram was released on 4 July 2008, Sasikumar asked the Central Board of Film Certification (CBFC) to give the film an A certificate (adults only) as he felt it would not resonate with female audiences. To his surprise, two female CBFC members said the film would indeed connect with women due to its emotions and message, and he agreed to a U/A certificate (parental guidance) instead. Moser Baer released the film via home video in June 2009. The film's satellite rights were initially sold to Zee Tamil who later sold them to Sun TV. The film had its television premiere on both the channels the same day, 26 September 2009.

=== Box office ===
Subramaniapuram was released two weeks after the bigger and higher-profile Dasavathaaram. Initially released only in a single theatre, the film's overwhelming response meant that it was later released in theatres like Shanti and Sathyam Cinemas who were initially wary of releasing it. The film ran successfully for 100 days.

=== Reception ===
Sify wrote, "Sasikumar should be appreciated for making a bold and daring film, whose success will augur well for the industry. Subramaniapuram may be a bit brooding and dark, but still it's worth taking a look". Pavithra Srinivasan of Rediff.com wrote, "Subramaniyapuram ends as it begins -- naturally, at its own pace. This one is for lovers of realistic cinema." Malathi Rangarajan of The Hindu appreciated the filmmakers for accurately recreating the 1980s setting including the hairstyles and attires but criticised the violence which she felt was too much for a U/A-certified film. Chennai Online wrote that the film's "characterization, flawless performances, art direction, smart execution, and realistic treatment" were its strong points. Kabilan of Kalki lauded the cast performances, especially that of Jai and Swathi, the music and cinematography but criticised the excessive violence and bloodshed.

=== Accolades ===
| Event | Category | Verdict | Recipients | Ref. |
|---|---|---|---|---|
| 56th Filmfare Awards South | Best Tamil Film | Won | Subramaniapuram | |
| 56th Filmfare Awards South | Best Tamil Director | Won | Sasikumar | |
| 56th Filmfare Awards South | Best Tamil Actress | Nominated | Swathi | |
| 56th Filmfare Awards South | Best Tamil Supporting Actor | Nominated | Samuthirakani | |
| 56th Filmfare Awards South | Best Tamil Music Director | Nominated | James Vasanthan | |
| 56th Filmfare Awards South | Best Tamil Lyricist | Nominated | Thamarai | |
| 56th Filmfare Awards South | Best Tamil Playback Singer Male | Nominated | Bellie Raj | |
| 56th Filmfare Awards South | Best Tamil Playback Singer Female Male | Won | Deepa Miriam | |
| Tamil Nadu State Film Awards | Tamil Nadu State Film Award for Best Male Playback Singer | Won | Bellie Raj | |

== Legacy ==
Subramaniapuram attained cult status in Tamil cinema, and was considered by Anandu Suresh to have "revolutionised" the Indian film industry at time he believed creativity had stagnated, and plot details were too frequently recycled by filmmakers. The film's screenplay was released as a book in 2014. On the film's 10th anniversary of Subramaniapuram, Anurag Kashyap tweeted that the film inspired him to make Gangs of Wasseypur. The film was re-released in August 2023 to mark its fifteenth anniversary. While promoting the re-release, Sasikumar revealed that he intended on making a sequel, but dropped the idea due to fear of it impacting the first film's legacy. Maari, despite the film's cult status and attaining popularity for his role, received fewer film offers and struggled with poverty over the next several years.

== Bibliography ==
- Dhananjayan, G. (2011). The Best of Tamil Cinema, 1931 to 2010: 1977–2010. Galatta Media. OCLC 733724281.
