= T. Uday Kumar =

Sound designer and audiographer

Udayakumar. T
- Born: 24 June 1976 (age 49); Chennai, Tamil Nadu, India
- Occupation: Sound engineer
- Years active: 2005 – present

Udayakumar T is a Sound designer and Audiographer who has worked in more than 300 films, primarily in Tamil cinema.

== Early life ==
Udayakumar. T is an alumnus of M.G.R. Government Film and Television Training Institute, Taramani, Chennai. After graduation (in 1998) he went on to assist audiographer Deepan Chatterjee at Director Priyadarshan's 4 Frames Sound Company before venturing out independently. He now works in Knack Studios, Chennai. He made his debut as Independent Sound Designer/Engineer with Daas in 2005.

== Career ==
Udayakumar has worked with both veterans and new generation directors including P.Vasu, R.Sunderrajan, Sundar.C, Hari, Pa.Ranjith, Siruthai Siva, Vetrimaran, M. Sasikumar, Bala, Samuthirakani, M. Rajesh, Ponram etc. His notable works includes Asuran, K-13, Kabali, Visaranai, Peraanmai, Vivegam, Chennai 600028 II, Madras, and Demonte Colony. His sound mix for Asuran played an important role in the commercial success of the film and was lauded for his work. Apart from sound designing and mixing, recently he made his foray into another domain, by doing script doctoring for the Tamil film K-13.

== Awards and recognition ==
Many movies are made on the editing table but movies do get developed at the mixing stage too like including filling logical loopholes thanks to Uday's expertise on commercial sensibilities. He is a recipient of the Tamil Nadu State Award for Peraanmai. He also won the IIFA Award for Chennai 600028 II and the Behindwoods Award for Madras and Demonte Colony.
