= Arthur Hull (percussionist) =

Arthur Hull is an internationally renowned percussionist. He is seen by many as the person who conceived and developed the idea of the facilitated community drum circle. He now travels the world training drum circle facilitators.

== 'Playshops' ==
Hull ran his first intensive 6 day long "Drum Circle Facilitator's Playshop" in Hawaii in 2000, and has hosted them there annually since then. These have developed to include a 10-day leadership/mentoring element open to returnees. This pattern has been duplicated in 2009 and 2010 in Scotland. Both attract a very diverse international population. Alongside these Hull travels for 6 months of every year running weekend trainings in countries across the world.

He also designs and promotes drums for drum manufacturers Remo, and creates experiential teambuilding and leadership events.

He has published two books:

- Drum Circle Spirit: Facilitating Human Potential Through Rhythm is a handbook for anyone wanting to work with drums with non musicians.
- Drum Circle Facilitation is an extension of the first, and the result of ten years of running training courses across the globe.

The books are the handbooks for his courses.

== Awards ==
He was winner of the 2005 Santa Cruz Calabash Award. In 2000 and 2002 he was awarded DRUM! Magazine's Drummie Award for Best Drum Circle Facilitator.

Hull's facilitated drum circles are specifically non culturally specific. Though African djembes may predominate, many other styles of drums and percussion are in evidence. The teaching at a facilitated drum circle is 'teaching without teaching' - participants are playfully encouraged to create their own in-the-moment rhythms and sounds. Freed from the pressure to get things right, people can relax and let the rhythms play them. Many, having become comfortable with their drum through such play, will go on to learn specific rhythms and cultures.

== Books ==
- Drum Circle Spirit: Facilitating Human Potential Through Rhythm White Cliffs Media, USA, 1998, ISBN 0-941677-84-2.
- Drum Circle Facilitation Village Music Circles, USA, 2006, ISBN 0-9724307-1-7
