= Deepa Miriam =

Indian playback singer

Deepa Miriam ദീപ മിറിയം
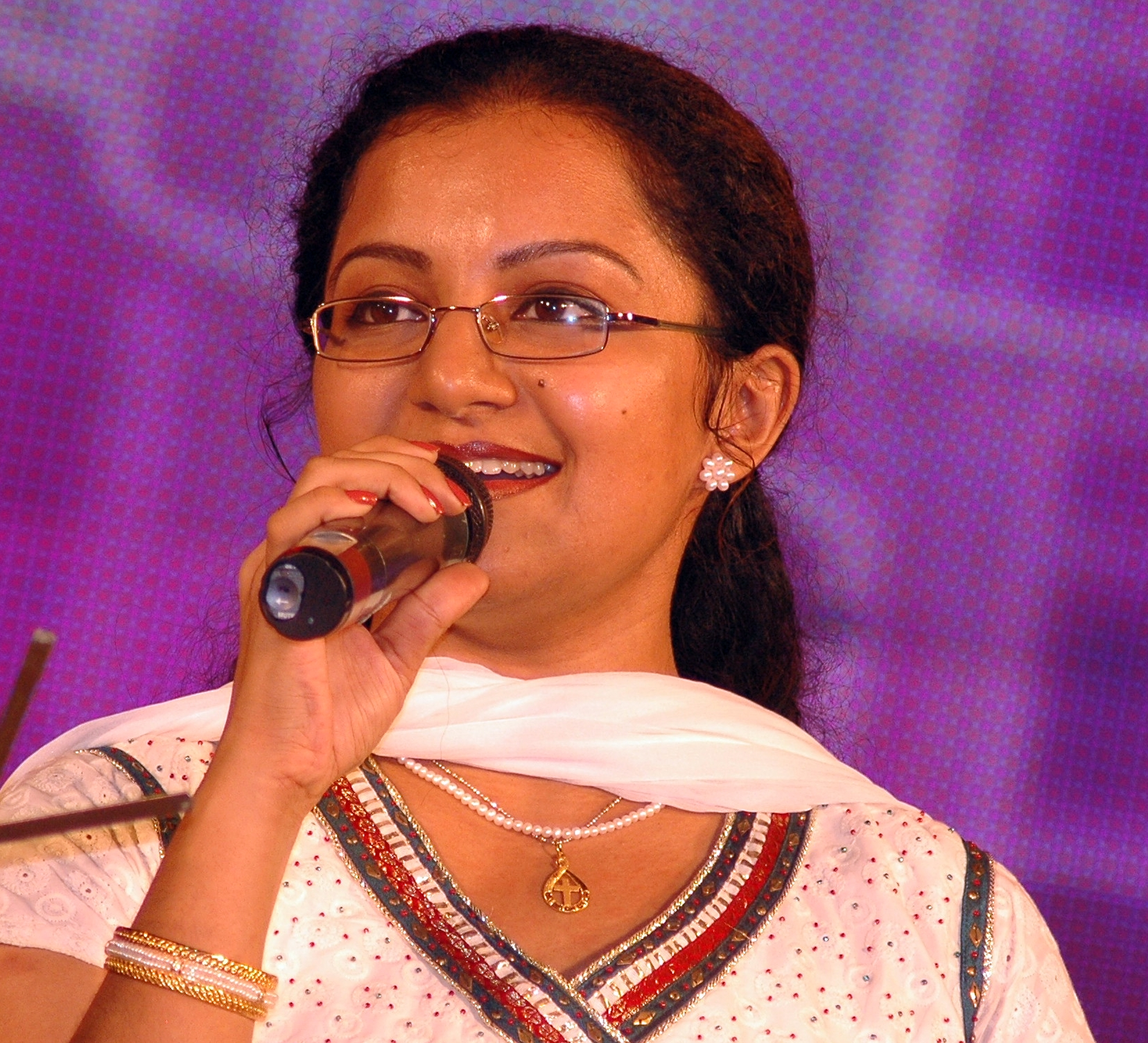
- Miriam in 2011

Background information
- Born: 1981 (age 44–45); United Arab Emirates
- Occupation: Playback singer
- Years active: 1992–present

Deepa Miriam (Malayalam: ദീപ മിറിയം, Tamil: தீபா மிரியம்; born April 1981) is an Indian playback singer of South Indian movies. Her debut film was Naan Avanillai. Deepa rose to fame with the song Kangal Iraandal in the Tamil movie Subramaniapuram.

== Life and career ==
Deepa was born and brought up in the United Arab Emirates (U.A.E.), to a Malayalee Christian family, and completed schooling there. She began singing at a very young age. She received training in carnatic music, beginning at age seven. She has won first place in singing competitions in light music, semi-classical and classical categories, and performed many live music shows with musicians from Kerala when still in school. Deepa passed the Twelfth Board Exam with Distinction. She received her B.Tech. degree in Electronics and Telecommunication Engineering from Model Engineering College, Thrikkakara, Kerala.

At the age of 11, she was named the Best Child Singer in U.A.E., after participating in a competition, Gayiye Aur Suniye, organized by Ras al-Khaimah Radio. She sang in her first Christian devotional album, Viswasanthi, at the age of 12. The album was a super hit. Deepa has sung in more than 40 private albums in Malayalam, Hindi, Tamil, Telugu, Kannada, English, and Arabic languages.

She has received training in Hindustani music (she passed the Junior certificate course from Kerala University) and Western music (she has also passed three grades with Honours for piano from Trinity College, London). She was in the United States (Chicago and New Jersey) for some time, with the purpose of doing higher studies, and perhaps getting a job and settling down. But the urge to sing brought the U.S phase to an abrupt stop.

Deepa's first film was Naan avanillai, where she sang Then Kudicha Nilavu. Since then she has been involved with many projects in the Indian film industry. Kangal Irandaal, the song she sang in the Tamil film Subramaniapuram (2008), was a massive hit in the whole of South India, and earned her many awards for best female playback singer.. She had also sung a song in Rettai Suzhi movie, Para Para Killi (2010) music composed by Karthik Raja.

== Awards ==
- 1992 Best Child Singer award, Umm Al Quwain Radio, All-U.A.E music competition
- 2008 Best female play back singer, Lime Entertainers, Chennai
- 2008 Best female play back singer, Benze Group, Chennai
- Best PlayBack Singer Female 2008' - Film Fare Award
- Best PlayBack Singer Female 2008' - by BRAVO Tamil Film Award, Tamil Nadu
- Best PlayBack Singer Female 2008' - Gmma Dubai.
- Best PlayBack Singer Female 2009' - Tamil Nadu Cinema Kalai mandram, Chennai.
- Best PlayBack Singer Female 2010' - Tamil Nadu Cinema Kalai mandram,
