= Drum circle =

Type of musical ensemble

A drum circle is an informal gathering of percussionists and dancers who meet in public for the purpose of playing drums and dancing to the music. Often seen at parks and beaches. Percussionists usually gather in a circle and dancers are often seen in the centre of the circle. The participants make up the music as they go along, using their listening and playing skills to make musical connections and express themselves in any and all ways that feel right. Drum circles often attract both regulars and spontaneous participation and they can range in size from a handful of players to circles with thousands of participants. Defining values of a drum circle include equality, autonomy, inclusivity and freedom of expression.

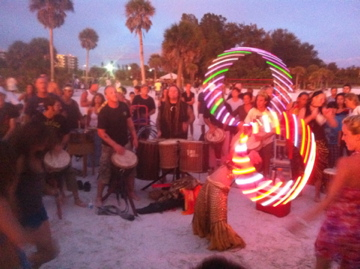
Flow Art at the Siesta Key Drum Circle

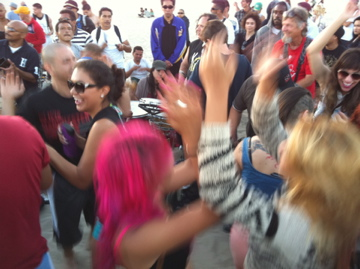
Celebration at the Venice Beach Drum Circle

The origins of contemporary drum circles in North America can be traced back to Congo Square in New Orleans, a pivotal site in the history of American music. During the French colonial occupation and before, this area was known as Bulbancha, a Choctaw/Chickasaw word meaning "place of many tongues," reflecting the diverse languages and cultures that converged there.

Congo Square was a unique space where enslaved Africans, free people of color, Native Americans, and the allies of freedom would gather on Sundays to sell goods often to buy themselves from slavery which naturally led to drumming, dancing, and maintaining their cultural heritage. This tradition of communal music-making and the blending of various drumming styles—European marching drums, African rhythms, and Native American beats—laid the foundation for contemporary drum circles and influenced the development of numerous American music genres.

Drum circles went through a revival in the United States during the late 1960s and early 1970s for any group of people, particularly counterculture groups, who gather (informally) to play music together in public. The music is improvised and co-created by the participants. The music is always a group expression, not constrained by genre, instrumentation and not directed by one person or sub-group. Drum circles are leaderless.

In 1991, during testimony before the United States Senate Special Committee on Aging, Grateful Dead drummer Mickey Hart stated:

Typically, people gather to drum in drum "circles" with others from the surrounding community. The drum circle offers equality because there is no head or tail. It includes people of all ages. The main objective is to share rhythm and get in tune with each other and themselves. To form a group consciousness. To entrain and resonate. By entrainment, I mean that a new voice, a collective voice, emerges from the group as they drum together.

Drum circles are a type of group drumming that have many benefits, including support, comradery, recreational music-making, wellness, learning, celebration, spirituality, and personal growth.

Over the decades, especially since the late 90's, other types of group drumming have been advertised incorrectly as drum circles leading to confusion regarding what a drum circle is. This has in some cases lead to real drum circles being banned by authorities who were under the impression that a drum circle is a commercial event and consequently regulating them with laws that are not applicable to gatherings.

== Other types of group drumming ==
Facilitated group drumming is where a person seeks to focus the intent and improve the quality and effect of the activity, making it easier for people to effectively participate by taking a more directive approach. The facilitator (leader) takes responsibility for the physical space, arranging chairs and instruments to optimize communication and connection in the group. Facilitators may provide a range of instruments to create a full and balanced percussion orchestra. In this way, the experience can be thought of as group drumming with a leader as opposed to the more free-flowing and open Drum Circle. The facilitator is constantly monitoring the music in the group, and generally being encouraging and accepting of participant ideas. In this way, the facilitator takes on a role similar to that of a music teacher or drumming instructor whose goal is to empower the participants and encourage them to share their ideas. In the beginning, the facilitator directs the music through verbal and non-verbal cueing. Cues, which often mirror the movements of an orchestral conductor, are directed at the participants, who respond to the leader. This creates a leader/follower dynamic between the facilitator and the participants. Actions such as rolling (rumbling), starting, stopping, raising/lowering the volume, accents, and when to play/not play are often given by the facilitator. Facilitators with training and experience in other areas and professions, such as music education, music therapy, and corporate training, may use a range of tools and approaches that enable them to work with diverse populations. These types of experiences are more accurately referred to as 'drumming programs'.

Guided Interactive Drumming consists of highly structured drumming-based programs that are led by an individual or group to reach non-musical goals.

There exists drum classes for the purposes of building musical skills and knowledge.

Drum ensembles are performance-oriented groups who practice and perform music on drums, often for dance.

There's clinical improvisation of drumming groups within a music therapy session, led by certified therapists.

== Group drumming with a spiritual focus ==
=== Neopaganism ===
Neopagan festivals, people gather around a large bonfire, the drummers generally sitting on one side to encourage better listening. The musicians sit together and play while dancers dance and circle around the fire. Often, those present will stay and play throughout the night until dawn, treating the evening as a magical (or alchemical) working. Sound is not limited to drumming alone; there is also chanting, singing, poetry, and spoken word pieces. This type of drum circle is not usually facilitated.

=== Shamanic group drumming ===
This type of group tends to center around Native American Cultural drums and rattles but is primarily focusing on the spiritual rather than the musical aspects of the culture. It is a facilitated circle but the leader is facilitating a shamanic journey process rather than a musical event. Shamanic drumming is generally simple and repetitive, often considered as a form of prayer or method of trance induction, rather than as music or entertainment. During a shamanic trance or shamanic journey, the shaman uses the steady beat of the drum as a "lifeline" to find the way back to the world of ordinary consciousness. Note that in these cultures, the term "Drum Circle" would certainly not be used. Rather, the terms 'drumming ceremony" or "ceremonial drumming" would be more accurate.

=== Medicine wheel drumming and prayer ceremony ===
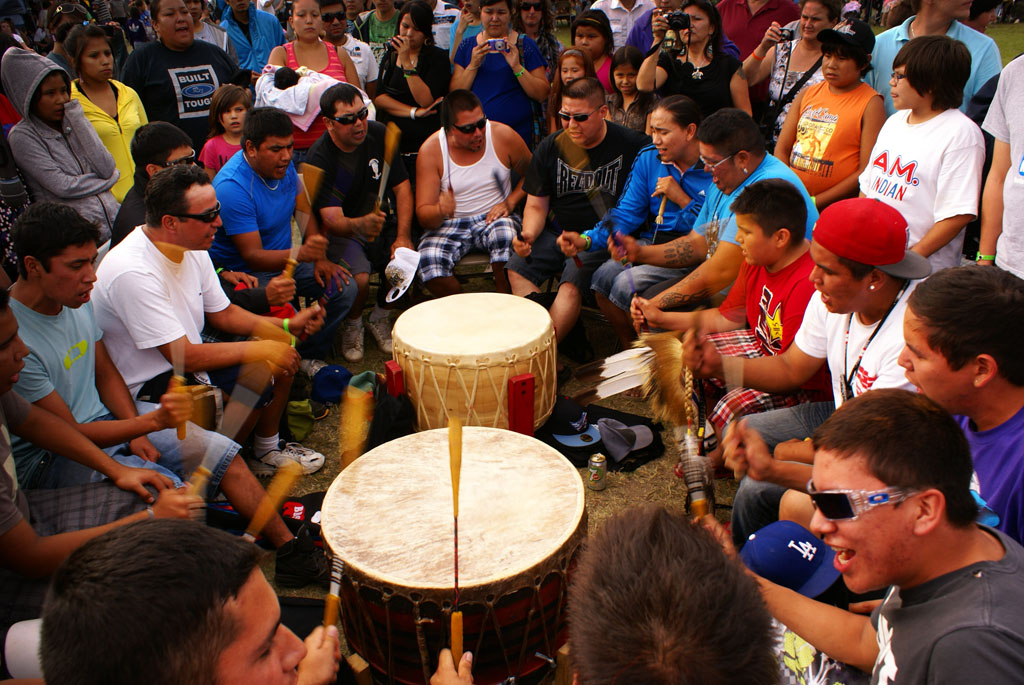
Atikamekw drum circle at a pow-wow in Manawan, Quebec, Canada

Practiced by various groups, "the medicine wheel group drumming prayer ceremony" recognizes the cardinal directions as spiritual powers that can help balance and heal. The ceremony has four rounds, with drumming by all participants at the instruction of the leader allowing the energy of each direction in each round to come into the group to facilitate prayers and healing. It has been described as "like a sweat lodge without the sweat". Author Jim Ewing held these ceremonies each month for seven years, as outlined in the book Finding Sanctuary in Nature, in addition to shamanic drum circles, and at various sites from coast to coast in the United States since the late 1990s. Groups based on his example and the instructions outlined in the book have resulted in other groups forming worldwide. This description is not of a drum circle in the sense that the term is commonly used. It is a drumming ceremony that takes place in a circle, but very different in content and form than a drum circle, more of an improvised community drumming jam.

== Notable figures in the group drumming movement ==
Commercial group drumming organizations and companies exist in most countries to serve various markets. There is also a growing body of people working in places such as hospitals, prisons, and hospices using drumming as a form of recreational and supportive music making. Music therapists often use various forms of group drumming (including improvised drumming) in their work to reach therapeutic goals and objectives. Americans include Arthur Hull and Kalani Das.
