= Agam (band) =

Indian band

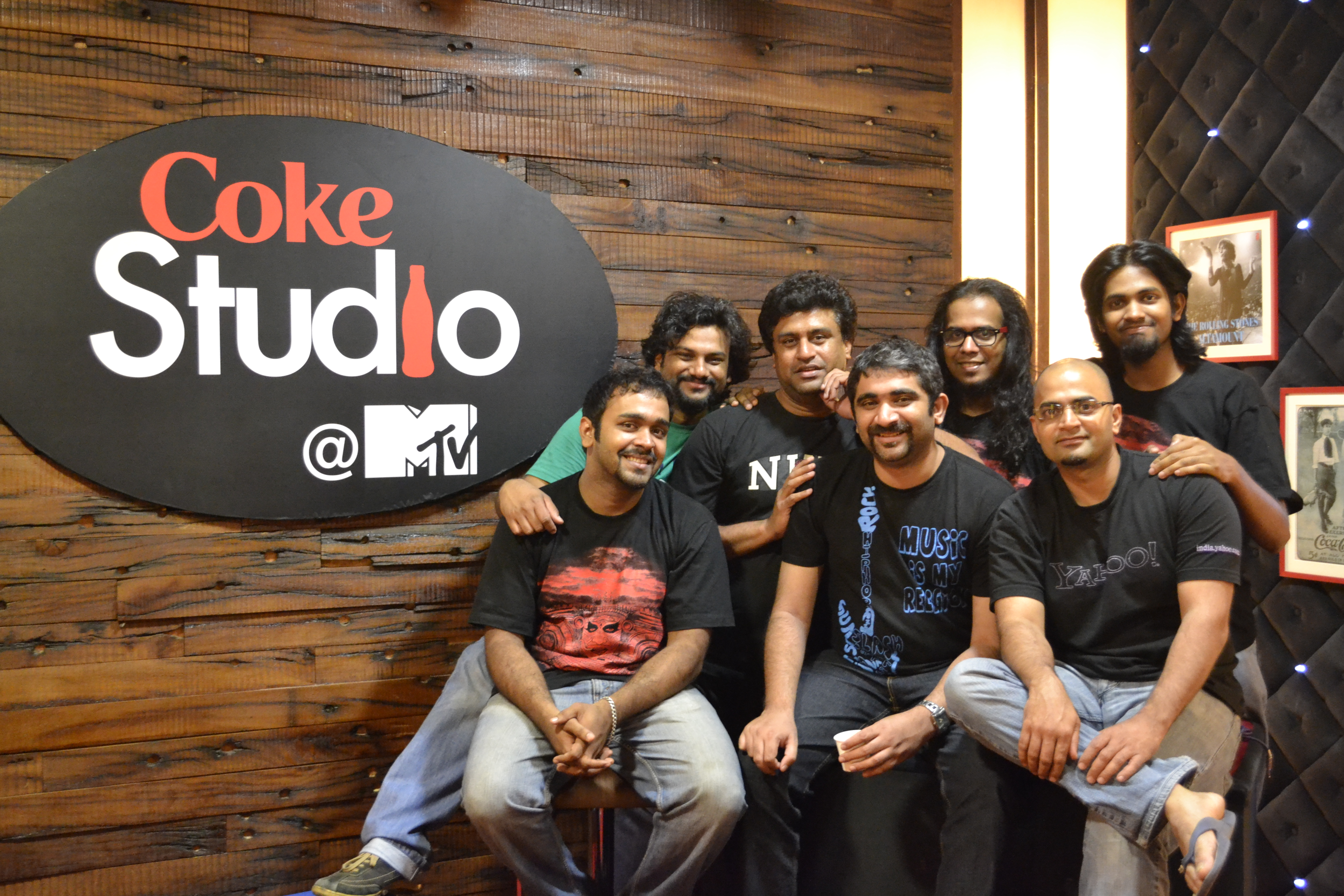
- Sitting: From L to R - Jagadish Natarajan, Vignesh Lakshminarayanan, Swamy Seetharaman. Standing: From L to R - Ganeshram Nagarajan, Sivakumar Nagarajan, Harish Sivaramakrishnan, T Praveen Kumar,

Background information
- Origin: Bangalore, India
- Genre: Carnatic progressive rock
- Years active: 2003 - present
- Label: Independent
- Members: Harish Sivaramakrishnan; Yadhunandan; Swamy Seetharaman; T Praveen Kumar; Sivakumar Nagarajan; Aditya Kasyap
- Past members: Suraj Satheesh Ganeshram Nagarajan; Vignesh Lakshminarayanan; Jagadish Natarajan

Agam (transl. Inner soul) is an Indian Carnatic progressive rock band based in Bangalore, Karnataka, formed in the year 2003. The band is renowned for its unique fusion of Carnatic music with progressive rock elements. Agam gained significant commercial recognition with the release of Malhar Jam, which was featured on MTV's Coke Studio and included in their debut album, The Inner Self Awakens (2012).

Over the years, the band's subsequent career has included extensive touring, collaborations with notable artists within the Indian music scene, and contributions to film music compositions.

== History ==
Agam was formed in Bengaluru by a group of college musicians who shared a deep passion for progressive rock and Indian classical music. The band derived its name from the Tamil word 'Agam', meaning 'inner self', reflecting their introspective and experimental musical approach. In their early days, Agam focused on blending Carnatic ragas with Western progressive rock, creating a unique sound that became a defining element of the band's identity.

Each member brought unique musical influences that shaped Agam's distinctive sound. Harish Sivaramakrishnan, a trained Carnatic vocalist with over 30 years of classical music experience, infused traditional South Indian elements into their compositions. Praveen Kumar Thyagarajan, the lead guitarist, was deeply influenced by metal music, contributing to Agam’s progressive rock edge. Ganesh Ram Nagarajan had diverse musical interests, spanning both Western genres and Indian classical music. Swaminathan Seetharaman brought in influences from reggae, hip-hop, blues, and soul music, adding another layer of diversity to the band's sound. This eclectic mix of backgrounds led to the development of Agam’s signature Carnatic progressive rock sound.

In 2007, the band had their first major breakthrough after winning Ooh La La La, a music reality show hosted by Sun TV and judged by A. R. Rahman. Their performances introduced them to a national audience, and the exposure led to widespread recognition in India's Indie music scene.

== Career ==
=== 2012–2013: The Inner Self Awakens (debut album), and awards ===
Following the band's breakthrough from the reality show, Agam released their debut album, The Inner Self Awakens, in October 2012. It showcased a seamless fusion of Carnatic classical music and progressive rock. The album was defined by its intricate ragas, heavy guitar work, layered vocal harmonies, and violin solos, all structured around unconventional time signatures and rhythmic patterns. The album received critical acclaim for its innovative combination of two distinct musical traditions.

The band collaborated with Shreya Ghoshal on the track "Live Again", created to raise awareness for breast cancer. In 2012, the band received two awards from Bite My Music Global Awards. They won Best Collaboration for their song "Live Again" featuring Shreya Ghoshal and Best Instrumental for the track "Brahma's Dance". The band gained a growing fan base and established its presence in the indie music scene. Their unique fusion style and energetic live performances made them a standout act.

In 2013, Agam received the MTV Indies Push Artist of the Year award, recognising their rising influence in the alternative music scene. They were known for their high-energy live performances and innovative compositions that fuse Carnatic elements with progressive rock, contributing to their growing reputation in the contemporary music scene.

=== 2014: MTV Coke Studio (Season 2) Feature ===
In 2014, Agam was featured on MTV Coke Studio (Season 2), where they performed their original composition "Malhar Jam". The performance highlighted the band's ability to perform traditional Carnatic music with contemporary rock elements. The track garnered widespread acclaim, amassing millions of streams across various platforms. The performance also featured collaborations with prominent traditional percussionists Arshad Khan (Khartal) and Annada Prasanna Pattanaik (pakhawaj), enriching the sound with authentic Indian percussion textures.

=== 2017: A Dream to Remember (studio album) ===
In November 2017, the band released their second studio album titled A Dream to Remember. The album comprises nine tracks that interweave reimagined classical compositions with original works. Notably, it showcases revamped pieces such as "Subrahmanyena Rakshitoham" by Muthuswamy Dikshitar, presented as "Onwards and Upwards", alongside fresh compositions like "Koothu Over Coffee".

The album's production spanned two years and featured contributions from over 80 musicians, highlighting its ambitious scale. Particularly, the track "Kooth Over Kaapi" stands out for its romantic and metaphorical lyrics, incorporating a full orchestra and choir, reflecting the band's collaborative and experimental approach.

Among the tracks featured on the album are "Rangapura Vihara", a reimagined rendition of Muthuswamy Dikshitar's composition, and "Mist of Capricorn", an adaptation of Saint Thyagaraja's "Manavyalakincharadate". These tracks exemplify Agam's unique fusion of Carnatic classical music with progressive rock elements.

=== 2017– present: debut in film music, and US tour ===
That same year, Agam made its debut in film music composition with the bilingual Tamil-Malayalam film Solo, directed by Bejoy Nambiar. The band composed two songs for the film: "Oru Vanchi Pattu", a reimagined version of their earlier track "The Boat Song", and "Thaalolam", a folk-influenced melody featuring Carnatic-progressive elements, sung by Shashaa Tirupati. These compositions were widely praised for their sonic textures and fresh approach to background scoring.

Since their second album and foray into film music, Agam has continued to perform extensively across India and internationally. Agam has toured extensively across the United States, with multi-city tours in both 2019 and 2023. Their performances in cities such as Seattle, Dallas, Chicago, Philadelphia, New Jersey, and Phoenix, including dates in California and Illinois, were frequently sold out shows. These shows showcased the band's distinctive Carnatic music and progressive rock style, primarily appealing to the Indian audience. The band aims to broaden their audience, introducing the traditions of Indian classical music to a global listenership.

=== 2025 – present: Arrival of the Ethereal ===
In 2025, Agam released their album "Arrival of the Ethereal" with 5 songs, "Walk of the Bride - Sita Kalyana Vaibhogame (Telugu)", "The Silence that Remains - Mokshamu Galada (Telugu)", "Shadows of Time (Tamil)", "Flight To The Summer Sky [Nagumomu Ganaleni & Vellai Thamarai Poovil] (Telugu/Tamil)", and "Between Doubt And Destiny (Sanskrit)".

== Musical Style and Influences ==
Agam’s musical style is deeply regarded in Carnatic classical and progressive rock music, one of the oldest forms of Indian classical traditions. The band’s compositions and songwriting are heavily influenced by the Indian raga system, which forms the foundation of their melodic structure. Their music often showcases intricate raga-based arrangements, seamlessly blending traditional scales and rhythmic patterns with contemporary soundscapes. The band's sound is equally shaped by modern genres, incorporating progressive rock elements, including complex time signatures, dynamic song structures, and metal-inspired guitar riffs. Their arrangements feature a fusion of melodic improvisations typical of classical performances with the aggressive energy and textures found in progressive metal where traditional Indian aesthetics coexist with the raw intensity of rock, making Agam’s music resonate with both classical purists and modern music enthusiasts.

== Discography ==
=== Studio albums ===
| Year | Title | Track(s) |
|---|---|---|
| 2012 | The Inner Self Awakens | Brahma's Dance |
| 2012 | The Inner Self Awakens | Swans of Saraswati |
| 2012 | The Inner Self Awakens | Malhar Jam |
| 2012 | The Inner Self Awakens | The Boat Song |
| 2012 | The Inner Self Awakens | Dhanashree Thillana |
| 2012 | The Inner Self Awakens | Rudra |
| 2017 | A Dream to Remember | Subrahmanyena Rakshitoham (Onwards & Upwards) |
| 2017 | A Dream to Remember | Rangapura Vihara |
| 2017 | A Dream to Remember | Manavyalakinchara (Mist of Capricorn) |
| 2017 | A Dream to Remember | Manassi Dussaham (The Celestial Nymph) |
| 2017 | A Dream to Remember | Saagara Shayana Vibho |
| 2025 | Arrival of the Ethereal | Walk of the Bride - Sita Kalyana Vaibhogame |
| 2025 | Arrival of the Ethereal | The Silence that Remains - Mokshamu Galada |
| 2025 | Arrival of the Ethereal | Shadows Of Time |
| 2025 | Arrival of the Ethereal | Flight To The Summer Sky |
| 2025 | Arrival of the Ethereal | Between Doubt And Destiny |

=== Singles ===
| Year | Track(s)' |
|---|---|
| 2025 | Old Time |
| 2024 | Mystical Aabheri |
| 2023 | The Seventh Ocean |
| 2017 | Oru Vanchi Pattu |
| 2017 | Thaalolam |
| 2019 | Thoomani Maadathu |
| 2015 | Live Again |

== Awards and recognition ==
- MTV Push Artist of the Year (2013)
- Bite My Music Global Awards (2012)
- Ooh La La La (2007)

== Band members ==
=== Current members ===
- Harish Sivaramakrishnan - Lead Vocals
- Praveen Kumar Thiyagarajan - Lead Guitars
- Swaminathan Seetharaman - Keyboards, Lyricist
- Sivakumar Nagarajan - Indian Percussions
- Yadunandan Nagarajan - Drums
- Aditya Kasyap - Bass Guitars

=== Former members ===
- Jagdeesh Natarajan - Rhythm Guitars
- Ganesh Ram Nagarajan – Drums
- Vignesh Lakshminarayanan – Bass Guitars
- Suraj Satheesh – Rhythm Guitars
- Vignesh Lakshminarayanan

== See also ==
- Indian rock
- Kryptos (band)
- Bhayanak Maut
- Nicotine (band)
- Inner Sanctum (band)
- Demonic Resurrection
- Harish Sivaramakrishnan
