= Kaattu Payale =

2020 song from Soorarai Pottru

Single by G. V. Prakash Kumar (Composer) and Dhee (Singer)

from the album Soorarai Pottru
- Language: Tamil
- Released: 23 July 2020
- Recorded: April–May 2019
- Studio: Divine Labs, Chennai
- Genre: Melody, dance music, Indian folk, Indian classical, Dappan kuthu
- Length: 4:06
- Label: Sony Music
- Songwriters: Music: G. V. Prakash Kumar; Lyrics: Snehan
- Producer: G. V. Prakash Kumar

Soorarai Pottru track listing
- 1. "Mannurunda"; 2. "Veyyon Silli"; 3. "Kaattu Payale"; 4. "Sooravalli"; 5. "Naalu Nimisham"; 6. "Aagasam"; 7. "Maara Theme"; 8. "Usurey"; 9. "Kaiyiley Aagasam" (bonus track)

Music video
- "Kaattu Payale" on YouTube

"Kaattu Payale" is the 2020 Tamil song featured in the soundtrack of the Tamil film Soorarai Pottru, directed by Sudha Kongara. Composed by G. V. Prakash Kumar, written by Snehan and sung by Dhee, the track is a melody number pictured on Suriya and Aparna Balamurali. The track was released as a single on 23 July 2020, on the occasion of Suriya's birthday. As of 25 January 2022, the lyrical version of the track crossed 100 million views.

== Background ==
The track was recorded during late-April and early-May 2019 overseas. Singer Dhee recorded the track, in his first collaboration with Prakash Kumar, though it was revealed to be a "funky" number. During the COVID-19 pandemic lockdown in India in late-April 2020, Prakash interacted with fans through social media, further revealing the track's title and the lyricist Snehan working on it. It was revealed to be a "slow-paced energetic dance track" which was "fun and interesting". On 19 July 2020, it was revealed that the track will be released on the occasion of Suriya's birthday (23 July 2020) with a promo song being released on that date. The audio single and lyrical video were released through streaming and video platforms respectively.

== Reception ==
Manoj Kumar R. of The Indian Express called "Kaattu Payale" as a "folkish romantic song which is instantly likeable" and praised Suriya and Aparna's chemistry as "unmissable". Khushboo Ratda of Pinkvilla further called it as a "perfect musical and visual delight" and the "euphonic tune is sure to give you the chills". Vipin Nair of Music Aloud stated "Composer (GV Prakash) gets Dhee to deliver the more upbeat Kaattu Payale, and once again the choice of singer is perfect for the kind of song it is (quite suits Aparna Balamurali's onscreen persona as well, truth be told). Very imaginative melody from GVP here, playing smartly with the pacing of the words, the occasional switchover to a darker flavour et al. [at all]." Karthik Srinivasan of Milliblog wrote in his weekly review, saying "In what seems like a song meant for Vaikom Vijayalakshmi, GVP hands over to Santhosh Narayanan-camp's Dhee! She does really well, though, and GVP's choice of tune-twist for ‘Mundhiyila Sorugi Vecha Sillaraya Pola’ makes the song really interesting!"

== Commercial performance ==
Within two weeks of the track's release, the song featured in the Top 100 Indian Songs on YouTube. The track was listed by Anjana Shekar (along with "Veyyon Silli") in her article about 7 Tamil Songs That Needed in Your Playlist, for the Indian digital news platform, The News Minute. The Times of India, listed "Kaattu Payale" in one of in the 5 Chartbuster Tamil Songs of 2020. "Kaattu Payale" was listed in the top-third position, along with five other tracks from the album, in the Top Tamil Tracks of 2020, for the music platform Spotify.

== Track listings ==
Original
No.	Title	Lyrics	Performer(s)	Length
1.	"Kaattu Payale"	Snehan	Dhee	4:06

Telugu
No.	Title	Lyrics	Performer(s)	Length
1.	"Kaatuka Kanule"	Bhaskarabhatla	Dhee	4:05

Kannada
No.	Title	Lyrics	Performer(s)	Length
1.	"Kande Kande"	Aniruddha Sastry	Sindoori	4:08

Malayalam
No.	Title	Lyrics	Performer(s)	Length
1.	"Andhikku Koottu"	Sudamsu	Sindoori	4:08

== Awards ==
Award (Note: Awards, festivals and organizations are in alphabetical order.)	Date of ceremony (Note: Date is linked to the article about the awards held that year, wherever possible.)	Category	Recipient(s)	Result	Ref.
South Indian International Movie Awards	19 September 2021	Best Female Playback Singer – Tamil	Dhee	Nominated	
