= Harish Sivaramakrishnan =

Indian playback singer

- Born: 27 September 1980 (age 46); Shoranur, Palakkad, Kerala
- Education: BITS Pilani
- Occupations: Playback singer; Composer; Carnatic musician; Engineer; Head of design (CRED)

Harish Sivaramakrishnan is an Indian playback singer who works in Malayalam and Tamil cinema. He is also the lead vocalist of the Bangalore-based popular Carnatic progressive rock band Agam.

== Personal life ==
Harish was born and brought up at Shoranur in Palakkad, Kerala. He is a chemical engineering graduate from BITS Pilani.

== Career ==
Harish Sivaramakrishnan is the lead vocalist and one of the founder members of the band Agam. He is also a playback singer working in Malayalam, Telugu and Tamil languages. Apart from his musical career, he is also working as the Chief Design Officer at CRED, after working for over a decade in Adobe and Google.

In 2016, composer Leon James introduced Harish to singing in Tamil cinema, and Harish sang "Unnai Matrinaal" for the former's film Ko 2.

In 2021, he won the South Indian International Movie Award for Best Playback Singer (Male) (Tamil) for his song "Veyyon Silli" in the film Soorarai Pottru (2020).

== Discography ==
=== Films ===
Year	Film	Song	Composer	Language
2012	Jawan of Vellimala	"Marayumo"	Bijibal	Malayalam
2014	Angels	"Irul Mazha"	Jakes Bejoy	Malayalam
2015	Oru Vadakkan Selfie	"Parvanavidhuve"	Shaan Rahman	Malayalam
2015	Rockstar	"Paalnila"	Prashant Pillai	Malayalam
2015	Rockstar	"Varikallo"	Prashant Pillai	Malayalam
2016	Ko 2	"Unnai Maatrinaal"	Leon James	Tamil
2017	Ramaleela	"Nenjileri Theeye"	Gopi Sundar	Malayalam
2017	Solo	"Oru Vanchi Paattu"	Agam	Malayalam
2017	Solo	"Dhevadhai Pol Oruthi"	Agam	Tamil
2018	Seethakaathi	"Avan"	Govind Vasantha	Tamil
2019	Chola	"Nee Vasanthakaalam"	Basil C J	Malayalam
2019	Neermathalam Poothakalam	"Yaminiyaayi"		Malayalam
2019	Puzhikkadakan	"Puzhikkadakan"	Ranjith Meleppat	Malayalam
2020	Soorarai Pottru	"Veyyon Silli"	G. V. Prakash Kumar	Tamil
2020	Aakasam Nee Haddu Raa	"Pilla Puli"	G. V. Prakash Kumar	Telugu
2022	Ori Devuda	"Evariki Vaare"	Leon James	Telugu
2023	Thaaram Theertha Koodaram	"Raave"	Mejo Joseph	Malayalam
2023	Aneethi	"Thuli Eeram Surakkaadha - Theme song"	G. V. Prakash Kumar	Tamil
2024	Siren	"Aagayam Odanju"	G. V. Prakash Kumar	Tamil
2024	Teenz	"Vaanamey Kaanomey"	D. Imman	Tamil

=== Albums ===
Year	Song	Composer	Label
2015	Padayatra	Job Kurian	Mathrubhumi Kappa TV
2017	Mist of Capricorn	Agam	A Dream to Remember
2018	Thoomani Madathu	Agam	Sessions from the Space
2018	Kooth (Koothu) Over Coffee	Agam	A Dream to Remember
2019	Paadukayanu Sakhi	Pallippuram Sajith	Music Mumbe
2021	Maayate	Mejo Joseph	Saina Music

== Awards ==
South Indian International Movie Awards:

- 2021– Best Playback Singer (Male) (Tamil) – Soorarai Pottru – "Veyyon Silli"
