= The Silver Mistress =

1973 novel by Peter O'Donnell

- Hardcover first edition, 1973, Souvenir Press
- Author: Peter O'Donnell
- Language: English
- Series: Modesty Blaise
- Genre: Spy fiction
- Publisher: Souvenir Press
- Publication date: 1973
- Publication place: United Kingdom
- Media type: Print (hardback and paperback)
- Pages: 254
- ISBN: 0-285-62112-2
- Preceded by: Pieces of Modesty
- Followed by: Last Day in Limbo

The Silver Mistress is an action-adventure novel by Peter O'Donnell which was first published in the United Kingdom in 1973. It was the seventh book of adventures featuring O'Donnell's comic strip heroine, Modesty Blaise.

== Plot summary ==
Sir Gerald Tarrant, head of a secret service department in the British Government, and good friend of Modesty Blaise, is being driven by his chauffeur along a narrow road on the edge of the gorge of the Tarn River in S. France. His chauffeur stops to help two nuns change a tire on their car, and Sir Gerald is taken prisoner – by the nuns, no less.

On the other side of the gorge lies Quinn, only semi-conscious after having stumbled and fallen while hiking. But he is sufficiently aware that he sees the two cars stopped on the road, and he tries to summon help by waving his handkerchief. Unknown to him, he is spotted by Mr. Sexton, who is the leader of the kidnapping operation.

This starts a long chain of events. Modesty rescues Quinn the next morning, and then later Quinn provides the missing information that convinces Modesty that Sir Gerald has been kidnapped. (Until now everyone had believed that Sir Gerald had died together with his chauffeur when his car went tumbling down into the Tarn River.) Modesty and Willie Garvin have by chance already determined the probable location of Sir Gerald's captivity: Chateau Lancieux in the foothills of the Pyrenees in S. France.

A hasty rescue mission is set in action. Modesty and Willie gain access to the chateaux via a deep cave, but on entering into the basement they are captured by the formidable Mr. Sexton, who prides himself on being the world's greatest unarmed combat man. Now Modesty and Willie are scheduled to die at Mr. Sexton's hand, one at a time, to further the process of softening Sir Gerald up for interrogation.

== Characters ==
Modesty Blaise
Willie Garvin
Sir Gerald Tarrant
Henry Quinn
Lady Janet Gilliam
Colonel Jim Straik
Mr. Sexton
Angelica "Angel"
Clare McTurk
Lucy Straik
René Vaubois
Weng

== Radio Adaptation ==
The Silver Mistress was broadcast as a five-episode adaptation on BBC Radio 4 from February 13-17 2017, adapted by Stef Penney and directed by Kate McAll, featuring Daphne Alexander as Modesty, Paul Bazely as Willie and Ian McNeice as Tarrant, with Clare Grogan (Clare), Ewan Bailey (Sexton/Colonel Jim), Sara Markland (Lady Janet/Angel) and John Ramm (Quinn).
