= Pieces of Modesty =

Book by Peter O'Donnell

- 1972 paperback edition
- Author: Peter O'Donnell
- Language: English
- Series: Modesty Blaise
- Genre: Spy fiction
- Publisher: Pan Books
- Publication date: 1972
- Publication place: United Kingdom
- Media type: Print
- ISBN: 0-330-02961-4
- OCLC: 13821797
- Dewey Decimal: 823/.914 19
- LC Class: PR6029.D55 P5 1986
- Preceded by: The Impossible Virgin
- Followed by: The Silver Mistress

Pieces of Modesty is a short story collection by Peter O'Donnell featuring his action heroine, Modesty Blaise, first published in 1972. It was O'Donnell's first such collection of stories (he would publish a second, Cobra Trap, decades later).

The stories featured in this collection are:

1. "A Better Day to Die"
2. "The Giggle-Wrecker"
3. "I Had a Date with Lady Janet"
4. "A Perfect Night to Break Your Neck"
5. "Salamander Four"
6. "The Soo Girl Charity"

Elements from some of these stories would appear in the Modesty Blaise comic strip which O'Donnell wrote concurrent with his book series. "I Had a Date with Lady Janet" is distinguished as the only Modesty Blaise tale to be told in the first person by Modesty's right-hand man, Willie Garvin. Later novels would include characters introduced in these stories (including the aforementioned Lady Janet), and reference events in some of them (such as "Salamander Four" and past events depicted in "I Had a Date with Lady Janet").

The stories in this collection predate the publication of the book by several years. In the 1960s they were planned for publication in a book that would have been illustrated by O'Donnell's comic strip artist, Jim Holdaway who died in 1970. That edition was never produced. Holdaway's illustrations for the stories exist and have been reprinted in various magazines. The stories were originally published as newspaper inserts in Australia in 1970, in a weekly called Pix, under the series title "Pay for Your Holidays Book (1–6)". The original order was:

1. Modesty Blaise and the Men of Salamander Four (3 January 1970)
2. A Perfect Night to Break Your Neck (10 January 1970)
3. A Better Day to Die (17 January 1970)
4. The Giggle Wrecker (24 January 1970)
5. The Soo Girl Charity (31 January 1970)
6. I Had a Date with Lady Janet (7 February 1970)

All were illustrated and eight pages long. The artists were uncredited, though the front page illustrations are signed by Holdaway for the first five (and the last looks like Holdaway's work). The interior illustrations appear to be by a different artist.

Pieces of Modesty is unusual in the Modesty Blaise canon as it was the only book in the series not published in its first edition by Souvenir Press, instead being published exclusively in paperback by Pan Books. In 1986, the American company Mysterious Press issued the book's first and (to date) only hardcover edition. In the 2000s, Souvenir Press began a series of reprints of the Modesty Blaise books, and after acquiring the rights, re-issued Pieces of Modesty in March 2010 with new cover artwork based on the original hardback edition of the first Modesty Blaise novel (as no first-edition hardback was published of Pieces of Modesty).

In the early 1980s, a dramatic reading of the story "I Had a Date with Lady Janet" was released on cassette tape by Pickwick Talking Books, PTB611, featuring John Thaw.
