= Last Day in Limbo =

1976 novel by Peter O'Donnell

- Hardcover first edition, 1976, Souvenir Press
- Author: Peter O'Donnell
- Language: English
- Series: Modesty Blaise
- Genre: Spy novel
- Publisher: Souvenir Press
- Publication date: 6 May 1976
- Publication place: United Kingdom
- Media type: Print (hardback and paperback)
- Pages: 256 pp (first edition, hardback)
- ISBN: 0-285-62225-0 (first edition, hardback)
- OCLC: 3126622
- Dewey Decimal: 823/.9/14
- LC Class: PZ3.O2623 Las PR6029.D55
- Preceded by: The Silver Mistress
- Followed by: Dragon's Claw

Last Day in Limbo is the eighth novel chronicling the adventures of crime lord-turned-secret agent Modesty Blaise. The novel was first published in 1976 and was written by Peter O'Donnell, who had created the character for a comic strip in the early 1960s. The book was first published in the United Kingdom by Souvenir Press.

== Plot summary ==
Maude Tiller, one of the few female agents in Sir Gerald Tarrant's secret service, is miserable. Her last assignment involved her having to submit to sexually degrading treatment by Paxero, the man she had been sent to spy on. And she hadn't even learned anything about the rich and enigmatic Paxero to justify the disgusting things she had let herself be subjected to.

Modesty Blaise and Willie Garvin discover how their good friend Maude has been mistreated, and they decide to teach Paxero a lesson. But when they break into his villa on the outskirts of Geneva they unexpectedly find a Breguet watch that was a gift from Modesty to Danny Chavasse, a very close friend of Modesty's. Everyone thought Danny had died when a cruise ship sank two years ago along with some 30 other people, but finding his watch indicates that Danny's fate was not as simple as that. Modesty confirms that Danny is alive with a visit to insane, but verifiably clairvoyant Lucifer (last featured in the novel, I, Lucifer), who has the ability to predict when someone is about to die; although he indicates Danny still lives, he warns her that one of her other friends may soon be killed.

This is the start of the journey that leads to Limbo, Paxero's secret and hidden plantation in the jungles of Guatemala. Limbo is a bizarre community led by Paxero's domineering aunt Benita, farmed by slaves, very special slaves, rich and famous men and women who have been selected by Aunt Benita and kidnapped and will now spend the rest of their lives at hard labour, watched over by armed Special guards.

The "last day in Limbo" occurs when Paxero decides to shut the plantation down, and orders the guards to kill all of the slaves – who now include Modesty, who has let herself be captured so as to infiltrate Limbo. Modesty leads a slave uprising, and Willie and Maude arrive just in time, after having hacked their way through the jungle. A final battle ensues, with Paxero and his heavily armed guards holed up in the big house, waiting for reinforcements to arrive by aircraft.

== Radio adaptation ==
BBC Radio produced a six-part Thirty Minute Theatre adaptation of the novel in 1978 starring Barbara Kellerman as Modesty Blaise with James Bolam as Willie Garvin and Richard Vernon as Sir Gerald Tarrant. This was recorded in April and broadcast weekly on the BBC World Service between 12 June and 17 July.
