= Modesty Blaise (novel) =

1965 novel by Peter O'Donnell

- Hardcover first edition, 1965, Souvenir Press
- Author: Peter O'Donnell
- Language: English
- Series: Modesty Blaise
- Genre: Spy fiction
- Publisher: Souvenir Press
- Publication date: 1965
- Publication place: United Kingdom
- Media type: Print (hardback and paperback)
- Preceded by: First book of series
- Followed by: Sabre-Tooth

Modesty Blaise is an action-adventure/spy fiction novel by Peter O'Donnell first published in 1965, featuring the character Modesty Blaise, whom O'Donnell had created for a comic strip in 1963.

== History ==
This was the first novel to feature the character of Modesty Blaise and her right-hand-man, Willie Garvin. The series of books (all written by O'Donnell) ran concurrently with the comic strip until 1996 (the comic strip ran until 2001).

In 1964, O'Donnell, who had just sold the film rights on Modesty Blaise and had provided a proposal for a film script, approached Ernest Hecht, publisher of Souvenir Press, with the idea to write a novel different from the film script. O'Donnell's film script was rejected, and the final version of the screenplay bore little resemblance to O'Donnell's original (the author was often quoted as saying only a single, inconsequential, line of dialogue remained from his original script). Hecht and O'Donnell subsequently decided to go with a novel based on the original film script. The novel was released a year prior to the 1966 film version of Modesty Blaise; while the film was not a critical success, the book proved popular with fans of both the comic strip and readers of spy fiction (Blaise was promoted on the cover of the first American edition by Doubleday as the feminine answer to James Bond), and O'Donnell followed up with 10 more novels and two short story collections over the next 30 years.

Most of the books had their first United Kingdom editions published by Souvenir Press, with Pan Books publishing all but the final volume, Cobra Trap, in paperback. A variety of American publishers, meanwhile, took turns issuing the series.

The American first edition by Doubleday was featured prominently in the Quentin Tarantino film Pulp Fiction (the hit man Vincent Vega, played by John Travolta, is twice shown reading the book). Reportedly the director used a mock-up of the book for filming, rather than an actual copy. Tarantino has stated his interest in directing a Modesty Blaise film on several occasions, but to date the closest he's gotten was lending his name to and executive producing a 2004 made-for-video production, Quentin Tarantino Presents: My Name Is Modesty.

In 1994, DC Comics published a one-shot Modesty Blaise graphic novel based upon the novel, drawn by Dan Spiegle and Dick Giordano.

== Plot summary ==
Garvin had low will to live. He had worked for Modesty Blaise for six years in The Network, Modesty's criminal organisation, and rose to the position of her right-hand man and became her acquaintance. Garvin seemed renowned.

But then Modesty disbanded The Network and retired, and Willie didn't know what to do with himself. He got involved as a mercenary in a South American revolution, but his heart wasn't in it. He was captured and is now sitting in a primitive prison, waiting listlessly to be executed.

Fortunately, Sir Gerald Tarrant, head of a British secret service organisation, knows about Willie's situation, and he needs the services of Modesty and Willie for a very special mission. Sir Gerald visits Modesty and lays his cards on the table. Modesty is very grateful and agrees to help Sir Gerald as soon as she has rescued Willie.

This is the start of the adventure. Sir Gerald's job turns out to be a perilous intervention against the criminal mastermind Gabriel, who intends to steal a huge consignment of diamonds. The action starts in the south of France, where Willie causes Pacco (who is on Gabriel's payroll) to lose his head (literally). Then it's on to Egypt, where Modesty and Willie get captured by Gabriel's gang. The diamond heist succeeds, and the action moves to a small island in the Mediterranean where Modesty has to vanquish the incredible Mrs. Fothergill in unarmed combat. But then all of Gabriel's gang are in pursuit, and there is nowhere to run.

== See also ==
- Modesty Blaise (character)
