= Dead Man's Handle =

1985 novel by Peter O'Donnell

- Hardcover first edition, 1985, Souvenir Press
- Author: Peter O'Donnell
- Language: English
- Series: Modesty Blaise
- Genre: Spy fiction
- Publisher: Souvenir Press
- Publication date: 3 October 1985
- Publication place: United Kingdom
- Media type: Print (hardback and paperback)
- Pages: 240 (first edition, hardback)
- ISBN: 0-285-62702-3 (first edition, hardback)
- OCLC: 13123492
- Preceded by: The Night of Morningstar
- Followed by: Cobra Trap

Dead Man's Handle is a 1985 action-adventure and spy novel written by English writer Peter O'Donnell. It was the eleventh and final full-length novel chronicling the adventures of O'Donnell's comic strip creation, Modesty Blaise. Although O'Donnell continued to write the comic strip, he did not write any further Modesty Blaise prose until the 1996 volume, Cobra Trap, which consisted of short stories. The opening chapters of the novel are set prior to the novel and comic strip and constitute the "origin story" of Blaise's partner, Willie Garvin.

== Plot summary ==
The headquarters of "The Hostel of Righteousness" is an old monastery on the Greek island Kalivari. But this does not imply that the organisation is a particularly holy one. On the contrary, Dr. Thaddeus Pilgrim and his followers are among the most unholy people you could have the misfortune of meeting.

By chance, Willie Garvin and Modesty Blaise are targeted by Dr. Pilgrim, who has an obsession for creating "interesting scenarios". Dr. Pilgrim sends Sibyl and Kazim, his two top assassins, to England to capture Willie Garvin and bring him to Kalivari under heavy sedation. There, Dr. Janos Tyl subjects Willie to the most diabolical brainwashing possible for him; he is made to think that a woman called Delilah has brutally murdered Modesty, and that he must now avenge Modesty's death by killing Delilah. Willie is shown pictures of this she-devil Delilah, in reality pictures of Modesty Blaise. In other words, Willie is now programmed to kill Modesty on sight, at which point he will regain his memory, and presumably go insane when he realises what he has done.

Modesty manages to pick up Willie's trail, and she eventually arrives at Kalivari, waiting until after dark to go ashore. Dr. Pilgrim has ensured that Modesty and Willie encounter each other in the old amphitheater, suddenly seeing each other when the spotlights are switched on. Willie doesn't hesitate a moment, he draws his throwing knife and throws it.

The story does not end here, and soon Dr. Pilgrim's obsession with interesting scenarios goes horribly wrong (for him) when Sibyl and Kazim are killed in gladiator-style duels and Dr. Janos Tyl is felled by a heavy round shield thrown frisbee-style by Willie. And finally, the ungodly Dr. Pilgrim meets his fate at the hands of one of his own assassins.

== Similarity to earlier comic strip ==
The plot element of Willie being programmed to kill Modesty on sight is a reversal of the scenario featured in the early 1970s comics strip "The Puppet Master" in which it is Modesty Blaise who is kidnapped and programmed to kill Willie.
