= Dragon's Claw =

1978 novel by Peter O'Donnell

- Hardcover first edition, 1978, Souvenir Press
- Author: Peter O'Donnell
- Language: English
- Series: Modesty Blaise
- Genre: Spy novel
- Publisher: Souvenir Press
- Publication date: 5 October 1978
- Publication place: United Kingdom
- Media type: Print (hardback and paperback)
- Pages: 318 pp (first edition, hardback)
- ISBN: 0-285-62381-8 (first edition, hardback)
- OCLC: 252234266
- Preceded by: Last Day in Limbo
- Followed by: The Xanadu Talisman

Dragon's Claw (1978) is the ninth adventure-espionage novel featuring character Modesty Blaise, written by author Peter O'Donnell.

== Plot summary ==
While sailing a small yacht alone from Australia to New Zealand, Modesty Blaise rescues Luke Fletcher, a world-renowned painter, from drowning. But how did Luke Fletcher end up adrift in the Tasman Sea, after disappearing in the Mediterranean two months earlier?

Luke Fletcher is not the only person from the world of the arts who has disappeared in the last couple of years, but he is the only one who has turned up alive later. Back in England, Modesty and her good friend Willie Garvin refuse to get involved in trying to unravel the mystery, preferring to leave well enough alone. But then Luke Fletcher is killed, and Modesty and Willie make it their goal to find out who is behind it all and bring him/her down.

The trail leads back to the Tasman Sea, to Dragon's Claw Island, but Modesty and Willie make a mistake and find themselves in captivity. They've solved the puzzle of why certain people with artistic flair have disappeared, but will they live long enough to make use of this knowledge?

Willie, ever the resourceful one, manages to break out of his cell, but then he's recaptured. After that the bad guys don't intend to give Modesty or Willie another chance to escape. They force Modesty to fight a gun duel against the Reverend Uriah Crisp, the gun-toting minister who has proven that he is faster on the draw than Modesty. Modesty is given her own gun and holster, her gun loaded with one bullet. She waits calmly as the crazy priest advances, a prayer book in one hand and a six-shooter on his hip.
