= Mim Scala =

Emilio "Mim" Scala (born 1940) is the co-founder of the London-based television, film and theatrical agency Scala Brown Associates.

== Early life and career ==
Mim Scala was born in London in 1940. He attended St Augustine's School and Hammersmith and Chelsea Art School at Manresa Rd, Chelsea. He grew up in the North End Road, Fulham, before moving to the King's Road. He then travelled extensively before settling down to work as a theatrical agent. In 1963, he founded the theatrical agency Scala Brown Associates with Sir William Pigott-Brown.

In 1965, Scala bought the rights to the comic strip character Modesty Blaise with the intention of casting Barbara Steele as the eponymous heroine in a feature-length production, before ultimately selling the rights to produce the film to Joseph Janni (who brought in the fashionable Italian actress Monica Vitti to play Modesty instead). Scala also packaged Jean-Luc Godard's film Sympathy for the Devil/One Plus One on behalf of Michael Cowdray's Cupid Productions, after being introduced to Godard's then rights holder, Eleni Collard, by the record producer Alan Callan.

In the late 1960s, Scala took off to live in Spanish Sahara, Spain, Sri Lanka, and Switzerland, painting and recording ethnic music, including that of the Dervish Ganoua sect from Tangiers. He returned to England in 1972 to work as head of promotion for Island Records. Scala produced the first direct-to-disc album for the band Warsaw Pakt, before founding ESP Music and Management.

== Other work ==
Scala is the author of the cult memoir Diary of a Teddy Boy: A Memoir of the Long Sixties, as well as two novels: The Luckiest Man in the World and Bibi. He now works as a sculptor in bronze, having had his first solo exhibition in 2014 at the 11 Gallery in Belgravia.
