= The Tenderness of Wolves =

The Tenderness of Wolves can refer to:

- The Tenderness of Wolves (film), a 1973 film
- The Tenderness of Wolves (novel), a 2006 novel
