= The Impossible Virgin =

1971 novel by Peter O'Donnell

- Hardcover first edition, 1971, Souvenir Press
- Author: Peter O'Donnell
- Language: English
- Series: Modesty Blaise
- Genre: Spy fiction
- Publisher: Souvenir Press
- Publication date: 1971
- Publication place: United Kingdom
- Media type: Print (hardback and paperback)
- Pages: 284
- Preceded by: A Taste for Death
- Followed by: Pieces of Modesty

The Impossible Virgin is the fifth novel chronicling the adventures of crime lord-turned-secret agent Modesty Blaise. The novel was published in 1971 and was written by Peter O'Donnell, who had created the character for a comic strip in the early 1960s. The book was first published in the United Kingdom by Souvenir Press.

The "Impossible Virgin" of the book's title refers to the name given by the local natives to a special geographic formation encountered during the adventure.

== Plot summary ==
Mischa Novikov had never considered defecting from Russia until one day when his analysis of a satellite picture of a tiny bit of central Africa awakens greed in him. Hidden in an almost inaccessible valley he can see untold riches, and he is the only man on earth who knows about them.

Eight months later Novikov dies in a small hospital not far from his hidden treasure, the victim of Brunel's over-zealous torture. And a few days later Modesty Blaise happens by and intervenes when two of Brunel's men start interrogating Doctor Pennyfeather, who had been at Novikov's deathbed.

Brunel refuses to accept that Novikov took his secret into the grave with him. The story moves to London where Modesty and Willie Garvin manage to sabotage one of Brunel's operations. But then Lisa, Brunel's adopted daughter, tricks Willie, and in France Brunel turns the tables and captures Modesty and Willie and Dr. Pennyfeather.

Back to Africa, to Brunel's plantation, where Modesty finds herself imprisoned, alone and drugged and being brainwashed, while Brunel slowly tortures Dr. Pennyfeather. As if this isn't bad enough, Adrian Chance, Brunel's right-hand man, succumbs to delusions of grandeur and manages to coerce Lisa into killing Brunel. Adrian Chance then vents his deep-rooted hatred for Modesty by locking her and Pennyfeather in a huge cage with a vicious gorilla. But then the fuel store goes up in flames, and the story takes a surprising twist. Finally, during a fight with machetes and quarterstaffs, Modesty sinks lifeless to the ground, and Adrian Chance rushes in for the kill.
