= The Night of Morningstar =

Book by Peter O'Donnell

- Hardcover first edition, 1982, Souvenir Press
- Author: Peter O'Donnell
- Language: English
- Series: Modesty Blaise
- Genre: Spy fiction
- Publisher: Souvenir Press
- Publication date: 21 October 1982
- Publication place: United Kingdom
- Media type: Print (hardback and paperback)
- Pages: 288
- ISBN: 0-285-62462-8
- OCLC: 9649150
- Preceded by: The Xanadu Talisman
- Followed by: Dead Man's Handle

The Night of Morningstar is the eleventh book chronicling the adventures of crime lord-turned-secret agent Modesty Blaise. The novel was first published in 1982 and was written by Peter O'Donnell, who had created the character for a comic strip in the early 1960s. The book was first published in the United Kingdom by Souvenir Press. The novel is notable for altering the usual format of the novels by beginning with an extensive prologue set during the title character's early career as a crime boss.

== Plot summary ==
"The Watchmen" is an international terrorist organisation that has sprung out of nowhere and is making major assaults, for example killing the entire Turkish Embassy staff in Madrid, wrecking a French nuclear power plant, and blowing up a dam in Utah. Nobody knows who they are or what their real motives are.

CIA agent Ben Christie, an old friend of Modesty Blaise, is trying to infiltrate The Watchmen. But Modesty runs into Ben in San Francisco and blows his cover. Things go from bad to worse when Modesty tries to hang around to help Ben if necessary and gets captured by The Watchmen. She and Ben are held at gun point on a small fishing boat in San Francisco Bay as The Watchmen make final preparations to destroy the Golden Gate Bridge.

Modesty manages to escape, but without gaining any way of locating The Watchmen. Back in England, she and Willie Garvin eventually get a lead on one of the top leaders of The Watchmen, Major the Earl St. Maur, formerly leader of a British Marine Commando battalion.

Following St. Maur's trail to Madeira Island off the coast of Morocco leads to several surprises, not the least of which is that The Watchmen intend to kill the Presidents of the United States and France, and Prime Ministers of United Kingdom and West Germany. This has to be prevented, of course, but before Modesty and Willie can get a warning out they are captured by The Watchmen and imprisoned and drugged such that they can not possibly escape. The Watchmen's plan: To leave Modesty's and Willie's dead bodies at the scene of the attack, clothed in Watchmen uniforms.
