= The Xanadu Talisman =

1981 novel by Peter O'Donnell

- Hardcover first edition, 1981, Souvenir Press
- Author: Peter O'Donnell
- Language: English
- Series: Modesty Blaise
- Genre: Spy fiction
- Published: 1981 (Souvenir Press)
- Publication place: United Kingdom
- Media type: Print (hardback and paperback)
- ISBN: 0-285-62412-1
- OCLC: 7991890
- Dewey Decimal: 823/.914 19
- LC Class: PR6029.D55 X3 1981
- Preceded by: Dragon's Claw
- Followed by: The Night of Morningstar

The Xanadu Talisman is an action-adventure/spy novel by Peter O'Donnell that was first published in 1981, featuring the character Modesty Blaise. This was the tenth book to feature the character. It was first published in the United Kingdom by Souvenir Press.

== Plot summary ==
Ms. Pendergast, a middle-aged nanny operating the criminal force "El Mico", may not be your typical villain. But in the world of Modesty Blaise, who is? She and her two young charges, Jeremy and Dominic Silk, have made themselves the most potent underworld force in North Africa. In their latest triumph, they've stolen "The Object" an item of immense value. However, they've also suffered their greatest setback - Bernard Martel, a top lieutenant, has double-crossed them and stolen it back.

Pursued and close to death, a delirious Bernard reveals to Modesty a series of obscure clues, setting her and Willie on a quest to recover The Object and rescue Tracy, Bernard's wife. From thrilling Tangier, to mysterious Marrekesh, to the grandeur of the High Atlas Mountains, Blaise and Garvin stop at nothing in one of their most riveting and action-packed adventures yet.
