= Life in the Twenty-First Century =

Book by Viktoras Kulvinskas

- Editor: M Vassilev; S Gouschev
- Translator: R J Watson; H E Crowcroft
- Language: English
- Genre: Non-fiction
- Publisher: Penguin; Souvenir Press
- Publication date: 1960
- Publication place: United Kingdom

Life in the Twenty-First Century is a Penguin Special book, published in Great Britain in 1960. It features predictions by 29 Soviet scientists concerning technology and science. It was edited by M Vassilev and S Gouschev. The English translation was performed by R J Watson and H E Crowcroft.

The original British hardback was published by Souvenir Press in London in the same year as the Penguin edition.
