= Sabre-Tooth =

1966 novel by Peter O'Donnell

- Hardcover first edition, 1966, Souvenir Press, featuring Jim Holdaway's original cover art.
- Author: Peter O'Donnell
- Language: English
- Series: Modesty Blaise
- Genre: Spy fiction
- Publisher: Souvenir Press
- Publication date: 1966
- Publication place: United Kingdom
- Media type: Print (hardback and paperback)
- ISBN: 0-89296-092-2
- Preceded by: Modesty Blaise
- Followed by: I, Lucifer

Sabre-Tooth is a 1966 action-adventure novel by English writer Peter O'Donnell, featuring the character Modesty Blaise which O'Donnell had created for the comic strip of the title. It was published by Souvenir Press in the United Kingdom and Doubleday in the United States. It was the second novel to feature the character, though technically it was the first original novel as the preceding volume was a novelisation of a movie screenplay.

This story introduces the American millionaire John Dall, who reappears in many of the following books.

== Plot summary ==
Karz is a military leader who has never known defeat. The huge Mongol is now assembling and training a large and well-equipped army of mercenaries in a hidden valley in the Hindu Kush Mountains bordering on Afghanistan. His objective: The invasion and occupation of oil-rich Kuwait.

Karz does have one problem though; he lacks a couple of top lieutenants to command two sections of his growing army. His choice falls on Modesty Blaise and Willie Garvin, even though he knows they are not for hire.

Meanwhile, Sir Gerald Tarrant, who runs a secret service organisation under the British government, has noticed that many mercenaries are being recruited by some unknown employer and disappearing. This worries Sir Gerald, and he asks Modesty and Willie to investigate. So while Modesty and Willie are looking for Karz (without knowing who they're looking for), Karz has Lucille (a child dear to Modesty and Willie) kidnapped, and commands Modesty and Willie to report for duty.

There is no possible way that Modesty and Willie can both save Lucille and sabotage the invasion of Kuwait. Modesty plays a long shot and is forced to fight the fearsome Twins, two men joined at the shoulders, a four-legged four-armed fighting animal impossible to defeat. And even if she survives that fight, how will Modesty escape from the isolated valley so far from civilisation?
