= A Taste for Death =

A Taste for Death may refer to:

- A Taste for Death (James novel), a 1986 mystery novel by P. D. James
- A Taste for Death (O'Donnell novel), a 1969 Modesty Blaise adventure novel by Peter O'Donnell

== See also ==
- A Taste of Death, a 1968 Western film
