= A Taste for Death (O'Donnell novel) =

1969 novel by Peter O'Donnell

- Hardcover first edition, 1969, Souvenir Press, design by Jim Holdaway
- Author: Peter O'Donnell
- Language: English
- Series: Modesty Blaise
- Genre: Spy fiction
- Publisher: Souvenir Press
- Publication date: 1969
- Publication place: United Kingdom
- Media type: Print (hardback and paperback)
- Pages: 288
- Preceded by: I, Lucifer
- Followed by: The Impossible Virgin

A Taste for Death is an action-adventure novel by Peter O'Donnell which was first published in 1969, featuring the character Modesty Blaise which O'Donnell had created for a comic strip several years earlier. It was the fourth novel to feature the character. The book was first published in the United Kingdom by Souvenir Press.

== Plot summary ==
Canadian Dinah Pilgrim (blind since 11) and her sister Judy are vacationing in Panama. They're attacked on a lonely beach by a pair of gunmen, and Judy is killed and Dinah is taken prisoner. Willie Garvin is nearby and he intervenes, killing the two gunmen, and incidentally determining that they work for Gabriel, the villain from the first Modesty Blaise book.

Willie and Dinah go into hiding, knowing that Gabriel can mobilise the entire Panamanian underworld to search for Dinah. Modesty comes to their aid, and a deadly cat-and-mouse game ensues, with both Modesty and Willie barely surviving traps that should not possibly be survivable.

Back in England, Modesty encounters Simon Delicata, a huge man with an ape-like build, and strength to match. A friend of Sir Gerald Tarrant is dead, and Simon Delicata is the killer. And Willie knows Simon Delicata from long ago, having been beaten senseless and near-fatally injured by him in a barroom fight.

Then Dinah is brutally kidnapped, and it becomes obvious that Gabriel and Simon Delicata are working together. Modesty and Willie travel to Algeria and The Sahara to rescue Dinah. But they're up against the most formidable opponents they've ever crossed swords with. Literally in fact; Modesty has to defeat the fencing master Wenczel in a duel to the death, and he's wearing a protective steel mesh jacket. The final fight, set in an abandoned Foreign Legion fort, occurs with Modesty incapacitated from a serious sword wound and Willie having to go one-on-one unarmed against the man-ape Delicata.

== Aftermath ==
The final Modesty Blaise comic strip story, The Zombie, published in 2001, ends with Modesty and Willie planning to return to the site of Willie's fight with Delicata, recover the buried treasure they left there, and donate it to the Salvation Army. One frame of the strip #10180 depicts the fight between Willie and Delicata in flashback. As a whole, the novels and comic strips tended to follow different continuities, with the occasional exception, such as this.

== Adaptations ==
The novel was adapted by Stef Penney into a five-part serial directed by Kate McAll on BBC Radio 4's 15-Minute Drama from 17 December 2012 to 21 December 2012. The cast starred Daphne Alexander as Modesty Blaise, Neil Maskell as Willie Garvin, Alun Armstrong as Sir Gerald Tarrant, Ewan Bailey as Gabriel, Sam Dale as Delicata, Geoffrey Streatfeild as Steve Collier, Samantha Dakin as Dinah, Alex Fearns as McWhirter, Matthew Gravelle as Grant, Jeff Mash as Skeet Lowery and Nigel Anthony as Sir Howard Presteign.
