= Modesty Blaise (1966 film) =

1966 film directed by Joseph Losey

- Theatrical release poster by Bob Peak
- Directed by: Joseph Losey
- Screenplay by: Evan Jones; Harold Pinter (uncredited)
- Story by: Peter O'Donnell; Stanley Dubens
- Based on: Modesty Blaise (comic strip) by Peter O'Donnell; Jim Holdaway
- Produced by: Joseph Janni
- Starring: Monica Vitti; Terence Stamp; Dirk Bogarde; Harry Andrews; Clive Revill; Michael Craig
- Cinematography: Jack Hildyard
- Edited by: Reginald Beck
- Music by: John Dankworth
- Production company: Modesty Blaise Ltd.
- Distributed by: 20th Century Fox
- Release date: 5 May 1966 (London premiere)
- Running time: 119 minutes
- Country: United Kingdom
- Language: English
- Budget: £1 million or $3 million
- Box office: $2.2 million (US/Canada rentals) or $3 million

Modesty Blaise is a 1966 British spy comedy film directed by Joseph Losey and produced by Joseph Janni, based on the comic strip of the same name by Peter O'Donnell and Jim Holdaway. It stars Monica Vitti as the titular heroine, opposite Terence Stamp as Willie Garvin and Dirk Bogarde as her nemesis Gabriel. The cast also includes Harry Andrews, Clive Revill (in a dual role), Michael Craig, Alexander Knox, Rossella Falk and Tina Aumont (in her film debut). The screenplay by Evan Jones and an uncredited Harold Pinter was based upon a story by O'Donnell and Stanley Dubens. The film's music was composed by Johnny Dankworth and the theme song, "Modesty", sung by pop duo David and Jonathan. It was Vitti's first English-speaking role.

The film's production saw creative clashes between director Losey and Blaise creator O'Donnell over the vision of the final film, Losey wanting to create a "pop art"-inspired spoof of the spy film craze prevalent at the time, in contrast to the relatively serious and grounded tone of the source material. As a result, the film heavily diverged from O'Donnell's comics and story outline in many ways, and includes a number of non sequitur elements including avant garde-inspired editing and production design, musical numbers and deliberate continuity errors.

Modesty Blaise was entered into the 1966 Cannes Film Festival, where it was nominated for the Palme d'Or. General critical reception was far more muted, with critics praising the visual style and off-beat tone, but criticising the divergences from the source material, convoluted plot, and perceived "style over substance" direction. Critical reception continues to be mixed decades after release, but the film has gained a cult following.

== Plot ==
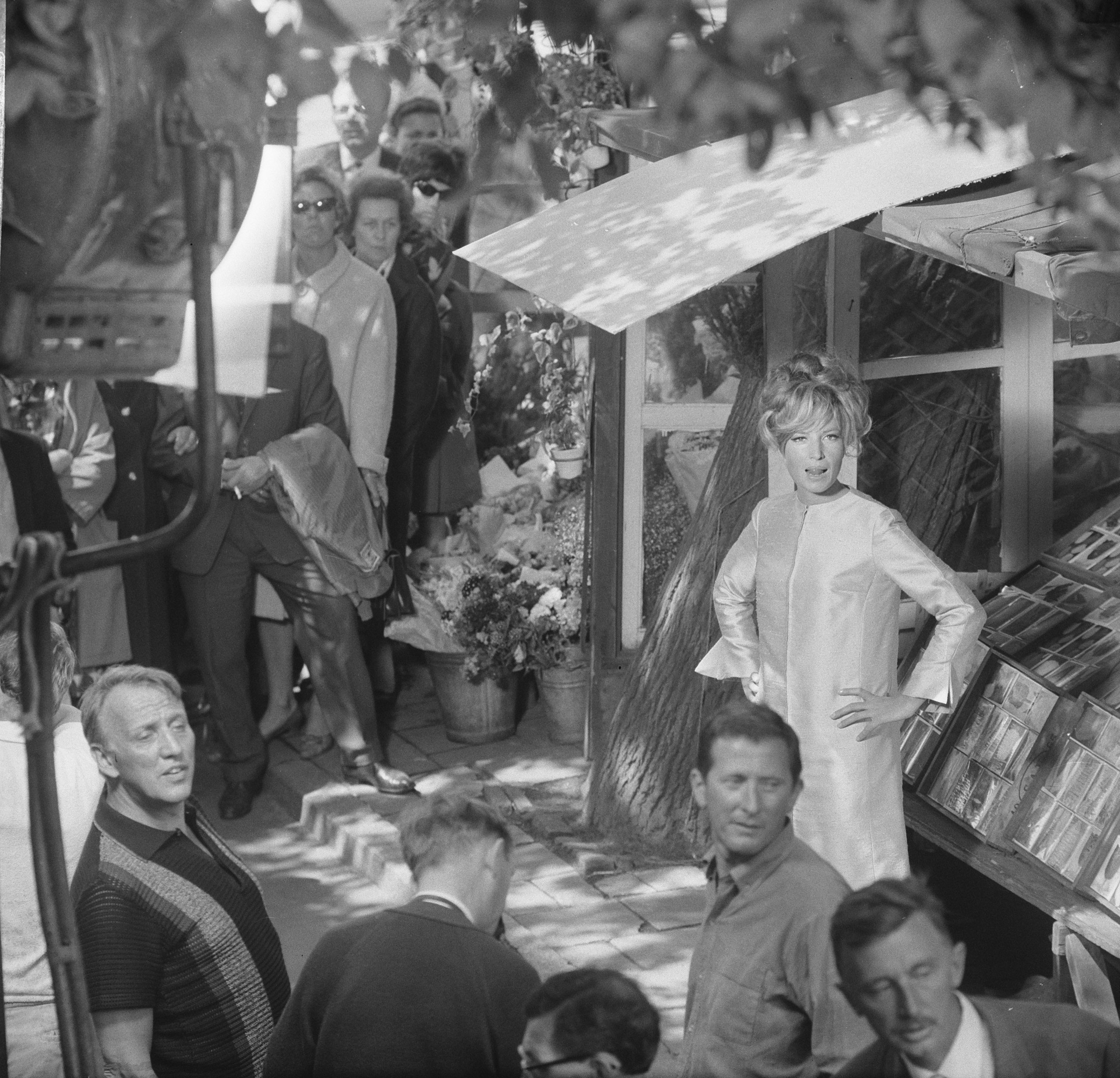
Monica Vitti at the set in Amsterdam, July 1965

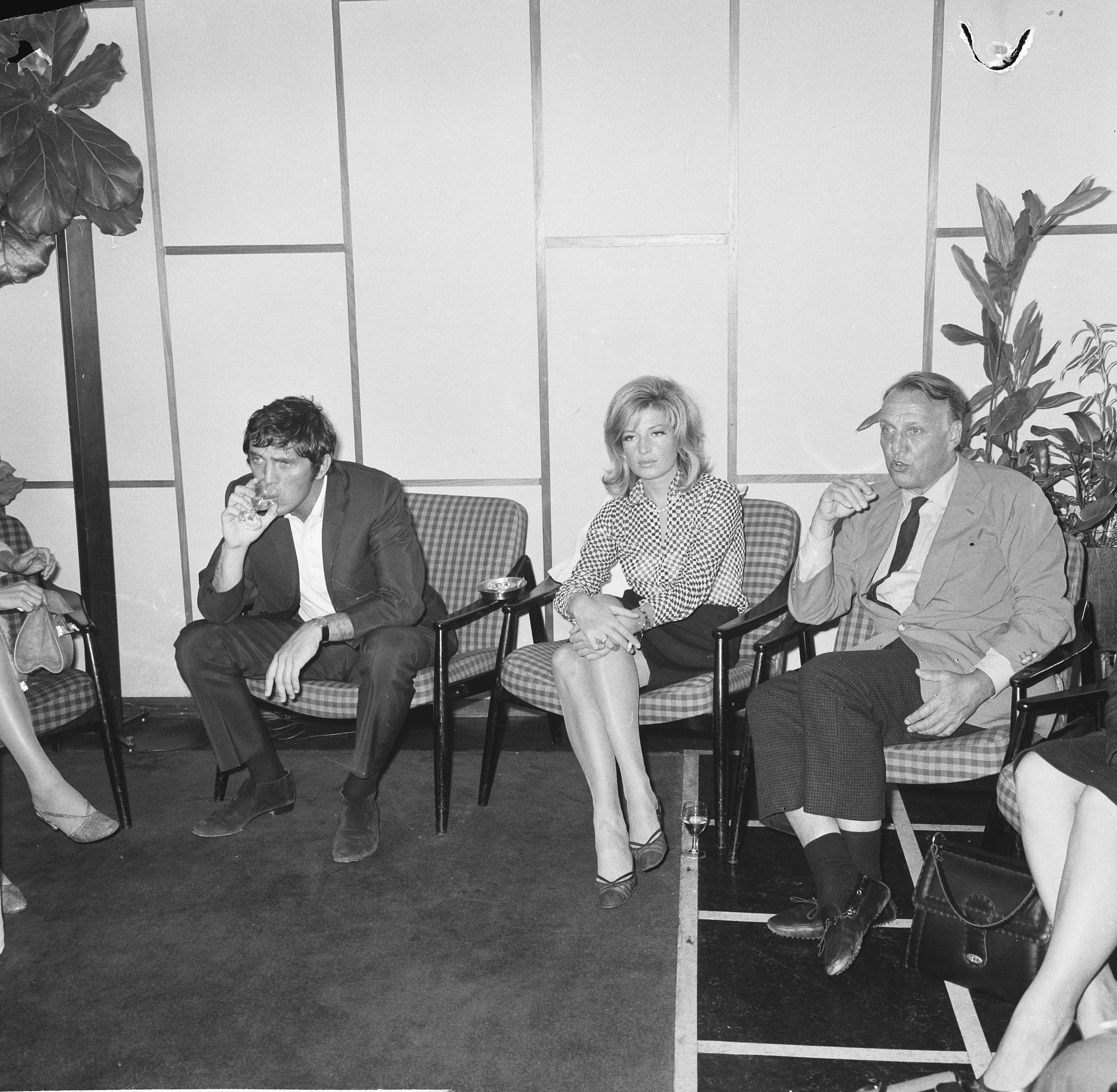
Interview with Terence Stamp, Monica Vitti and director Joseph Losey

After the assassination of one of their agents in Amsterdam, British Secret Service chief Sir Gerald Tarrant recruits former criminal mastermind Modesty Blaise to protect a shipment of diamonds en route to Abu Tahir, the Sheikh of a small Middle Eastern kingdom. The shipment has also attracted Gabriel, the head of a criminal organisation that includes his accountant McWhirter and bodyguard Mrs Fothergill. Modesty believes that Gabriel, who maintains a compound in the Mediterranean, is dead, but he reveals himself to her.

In exchange for an exclusive discount on the kingdom's oil exports, the British government delivers periodic diamond shipments to the Sheikh. Modesty, who enjoys an ongoing love–hate relationship with law enforcement, is recruited not only for her competence, but because she is the Sheikh's adopted daughter and thus trusted by him implicitly. Modesty agrees to the arrangement, on the condition that she is given total immunity by the British government and complete freedom to deliver the diamonds how she sees fit.

With Tarrant monitoring her from afar, Modesty travels to Amsterdam, where she reunites with her former lover Paul Hagen, a Secret Service agent and aide to Tarrant. She calls upon her longtime partner, Willie Garvin, who is reuniting with an old flame, Nicole, who may have information on Gabriel through her employer, an illusionist associated with him. Modesty narrowly survives several attempts on her life by Gabriel's assassins, whose failure leads to their swift execution by the ruthless Mrs Fothergill. Modesty continually toys with Paul, first seducing him before stealing his gun and disappearing.

When Gabriel learns that Nicole is working with Modesty and Willie, he orders her assassinated. The illusionist sends thugs to have her killed, and they succeed when Modesty and Willie fail to intervene in time. Modesty and Willie set themselves up as live bait to draw Gabriel out, but find themselves pursued by Tarrant and a jilted Paul, being briefly arrested before quickly escaping with the help of some smoke bombs. When Modesty attempts to identify and infiltrate the boat being used by Gabriel for the planned diamond theft, she is lured into a trap and captured. Gabriel reveals his true plan, to use Modesty as leverage to force Willie to steal the diamonds for him.

Willie reluctantly agrees to the arrangement, successfully stealing the diamonds from under Tarrant and Paul's noses. He and Modesty are subsequently taken to Gabriel's island fortress, where they are promptly thrown into prison cells. Gabriel offers Modesty to join forces, but she refuses. Willie and Modesty escape and kill Mrs Fothergill, and signal their location to the Sheikh's forces. The Sheikh leads his army to the island, leading to an all-out battle with Gabriel's forces and ending in his capture and the diamonds reaching their intended owner.

In his desert camp, the Sheikh leaves Gabriel tied up outside to dehydrate. McWhirter suddenly appears in Highland dress to free his employer, though no one seems to notice or care. When the Sheikh asks Modesty what he can do for her, she asks for the diamonds. He responds by laughing boisterously and she seems to go along with it, but suddenly breaks the fourth wall by looking directly at the camera.

== Cast ==
- Monica Vitti as Modesty Blaise, a criminal mastermind with a love–hate relationship with the British Secret Service, who occasionally employ her and grant her immunity due to her immense talents.
- Terence Stamp as Willie Garvin, Modesty's loyal Cockney sidekick with whom she has a "will they or won't they" relationship that ends in mutual (possibly sarcastic) marriage proposals. Their relationship differs from the source material, where it is purely platonic.
- Dirk Bogarde as Gabriel, another criminal mastermind and Modesty's equal, defined by camp mannerisms and a sensitivity to violence in spite of his ruthlessness.
- Harry Andrews as Sir Gerald Tarrant, the chief of the British Secret Service who has a begrudging respect for Modesty and acts as her liaison to the government.
- Michael Craig as Paul Hagen, a straight-laced agent of the British Secret Service and former lover of Modesty's. He is an original character created for the film.
- Clive Revill in a dual role as McWhirter and Sheik Abu Tahir; the former is Gabriel's loyal and dogged Scottish accountant, and the latter is the once-deposed ruler of a small Middle Eastern kingdom and the informal foster father of Modesty, whom he calls his "son". The latter character takes the role of Modesty's mentor "Lob" from the original comics, and is otherwise an original character.
- Alexander Knox as the Minister, an anxious government bureaucrat tasked with protecting the Sheikh's diamonds, a task he is largely unsuited to and which he leaves to his subordinates.
- Rossella Falk (credited as Rosella Falk) as Mrs Clara Fothergill, Gabriel's Amazonian bodyguard and chief of security, a psychopath who enjoys killing people to cure her boredom. She is loosely based on the more tough, muscular and thuggish character of the same name in O'Donnell's source novel.
- Scilla Gabel as Melina.
- Michael Chow as Weng, Modesty's loyal Chinese butler.
- Joe Melia as Crevier.
- Saro Urzì as Basilio.
- Tina Aumont (credited as Tina Marquand) as Nicole, Willie's old flame now working as a magician's assistant in Amsterdam. She becomes embroiled in her former lover's schemes due to her employer's connections to Gabriel. She is an original character created for the film.
- Oliver MacGreevy as tattooed man.
- Silvan as Pacco, the illusionist.

Other actors in the film include Jon Bluming as Hans, Lex Schoorel as Walter, Roberto Bisacco as Enrico, John Karlsen as Oleg, Wolfgang Hillinger as Handsome, John Stacy as the Tyboria captain, Robin Hunter and Denys Graham as pilots, and Robin Fox as Desmond.

== Production ==
In 1965, Mim Scala of the Scala Browne Agency saw O'Donnell's strip and acquired the film rights to the character. Scala had the idea of casting Barbara Steele as Modesty with Michael Caine as Willie and Sidney Gilliat directing, but he sold the production rights to Joseph Janni, who had Monica Vitti and Joseph Losey as his clients. Caine would ultimately star in Alfie, a role intended for his friend and former flatmate Terence Stamp, who wound up playing Willie.

Modesty Blaise was released at the height of a cinematic trend: the popularity of James Bond had spawned a number of similarly themed films. Some were intended as serious spy adventures, others as parodies or pastiches of Bond and his genre. Director Joseph Losey and the screenwriters chose to follow the latter approach, by making Modesty Blaise a campy, sometimes surrealistic comedy-adventure. Playwright Harold Pinter, Losey's regular collaborator, made uncredited contributions to the final script.

The film was shot on location in London, Amsterdam, and Naples. Interiors were filmed at Shepperton Studios. Gabriel's island fortress was filmed at Castello di Sant'Alessio Siculo in Sicily.

Joseph Losey found it difficult to work with Monica Vitti, as she would invariably be accompanied on the set by director Michelangelo Antonioni, in whose movies she had become famous. Antonioni would often whisper suggestions to her, and she would take direction from him rather than Losey. Eventually, Losey asked Antonioni, whom he greatly admired, to keep away from the studios during filming. Antonioni complied. Dirk Bogarde likewise disliked working with her, saying in a radio interview years later that she was the only one of his leading ladies whom he had actively disliked.

Modesty Blaise includes a metafictional element during one sequence where Blaise, while visiting a friend's apartment, comes across several newspapers with the Modesty Blaise comic strip, which are shown in close-up; artist Jim Holdaway's work is prominently shown, as is Peter O'Donnell's name. During the sequence, Vitti briefly dons a brunette wig and dresses up in a close approximation of how Holdaway depicted Modesty in the comic strips (images from this scene are often used to represent the film, including the cover of the first Pan Books paperback edition of O'Donnell's novelisation). Supporters of the film suggest this indicates that the film is not intended to take place in the same "universe" as the comic strip.

== Comparison to source material ==
O'Donnell's original screenplay went through a large number of rewrites by other people, and he often later complained that the finished movie retained only one line of his original dialogue. O'Donnell states this in some of his introductions to reprints of his comic strip by Titan Books. As a result, although the basic plotline and characters are based on the comic strip, such as Willie killing a thug in an alley, many changes were made.

Some are cosmetic — Vitti appears as a blonde for most of the film, except for one sequence in which, as noted above, she actually dresses up like a real-life version of the comic strip character. The film also prominently focuses on a large leg tattoo the film version of the character sports; no such tattoo is ever referenced in the comic strip or later novels. Also, while the comic strip established early on that Modesty considered herself to be English, her actual ethnic background was left ambiguous beyond her being vaguely from the Middle East region; no attempt was made to disguise Vitti's strong Italian accent, making it apparent that her version of Blaise was from Italy.

Likewise, Stamp initially appears in a blond wig (giving him a similar appearance to the comic strip character) and subsequently reverts to his natural dark hair; in the film Modesty and Willie acknowledge the hair colour change with each other. Other changes are more profound. For example, as the film progresses, Willie and Modesty fall in love and decide to get married, proclaiming the same during a sudden musical production number that pops up during a lull in the action. Even though the comic strip was only a few years old at this time and no novels had yet been published, this plot point nonetheless breaks a cardinal rule set out by O'Donnell when he created the characters: They would never have a romantic relationship in the traditional sense; the writer stayed true to this right up to the end of the comic strip in 2001.

The character of Sheikh Abu Tahir fills the function of Lob, Modesty's adoptee father and mentor, who gives her the name "Modesty Blaise". The Sheikh is otherwise an original character with no equivalent character in the source material. Other original characters include Paul Hagen, Mrs. Fothergill, McWhirter and Nicole, though O'Donnell would incorporate all of them into the novelisation of the film.

== Novelisation ==
Prior to the release of the film, O'Donnell novelised his version of the screenplay as a novel titled Modesty Blaise. This book was a critical and sales success, resulting in O'Donnell alternating between writing novels and writing the comic strip for the next 30 years. O'Donnell's version of the screenplay was also used as the basis for a late-1990s Modesty Blaise graphic novel published by DC Comics.

== Critical reception ==
=== Box office ===
According to Fox records, the film needed to earn $5,800,000 in rentals to break even and made $4,825,000, meaning it lost money.

=== Critical response ===
Modesty Blaise was a moderate success at the time of its original release, Bosley Crowther, writing in The New York Times, characterised the film as "a weird film, all right. Maybe, if the whole thing were on a par with some of its flashier and wittier moments, or were up to its pictorial design, which is dazzling, it might be applauded as a first-rate satiric job." According to Crowther: "The scenery, a few pop-art settings and a gay, nonchalant musical score are indeed, about the only consistently amusing things about this whacky color film."

Modesty Blaise was entered into the 1966 Cannes Film Festival, where it was nominated for the Palme d'Or, but lost to A Man and a Woman and The Birds, the Bees and the Italians.

Two more serious attempts at adapting the comic strip for the screen occurred in 1982 with a Modesty Blaise starring Ann Turkel as an apparently American version of Blaise, and again in 2003 with My Name Is Modesty, a prequel starring Alexandra Staden in the title role and omitting the Willie Garvin character entirely.

=== Retrospective appraisal ===
The film was conceived as a burlesque of the emerging James Bond sagas "with their male-chauvinistic ethic, their infatuation with gadgetry, their depersonalization, their evident and self-glorifying delight in violence, and their complicated story lines."

Rather than emulating this formula, Losey creates "outlandish and bizarre settings" in a savage satire of the Bond movies. The "lurid Op art designs" are so excessive they approach the surreal and, as such, indict the "shallowness of the characters". Modesty Blaise has none of the self-effacing irony of the Bond pictures. Rather, Losey offers a "visually sophisticated and bitter" social satire incorporating "violence, government hypocrisy, heroism", yet is "strangely asexual".

20th Century Fox provided Losey with the largest budget of his career: $6 million.

The studio sought to capitalise on the James Bond film phenomena, but with a female protagonist. Losey failed to satisfy studio box office expectations, though the film became a cult phenomenon on college campuses. Film critic Foster Hirsch comments on the casting choices:

The characters in the film are antisex, and their essential heavy-heartedness is reinforced by the casting of Monica Vitti and Terence Stamp. Vitti carries her existential despair into this film, and makes the most plodding of superspies...she is disastrously miscast...

Hirsch asks rhetorically: "[D]id Losey use her deliberately, to undercut the pop thrust of the material...by offering us this most dour and accommodating of high thriller heroines?"

Hirsch questions the choice of Terence Stamp to play opposite of Vitti, an actor praised for his work in Billy Budd (1962) and Teorema (1968):

Stamp is trained in an entirely different kind of film. When Vitti and Stamp, both so serious and downbeat, are made to sing and dance, the results are embarrassing rather than comic...
