= Daphne Alexander =

Cypriot actress

- Born: Daphne Chrysostomides; Nicosia, Cyprus
- Education: London Academy of Music and Dramatic Art
- Occupation: Actress
- Years active: 2006–present

Daphne Alexander is a Cypriot actress best known for playing Nadia Talianos in the BBC Drama series Casualty and Modesty Blaise in three BBC radio adaptations.

== Early life ==
Alexander was born and brought up in Cyprus, living later in both Paris, France and London, England. She studied law at Somerville College, Oxford before training to be an actress at LAMDA.

== Career ==
Soon after graduating from LAMDA, Alexander was cast in the BBC's long running medical drama Casualty, playing nurse Nadia from February to December 2007. She went on to roles in the HBO/BBC co-production House of Saddam, and the movies The Fourth Kind and The Ghost Writer, working with Roman Polanski on the latter. In 2011 she starred in the short film The Palace, which won multiple awards and received wide critical acclaim.

On stage, Alexander has worked in both London and New York. Notable productions include Hidden in the Sand (2013), and City Stories (2015–2016), both by James Phillips, and Camelot: The Shining City (2015) by Alan Lane of the Slung Low Theatre Company.

She appeared in the films Minore, from director Konstantinos Koutsoliotas, and Siege on Liperti Street, directed by Stavros Pamballis, which were both screened at the Thessaloniki International Film Festival, in addition to starring in the films The Hunted and One Night in Bath. She also made an appearance as Amy in the 2023 film Sergeant, and starred as British-Greek journalist called Thalia Symon in Beckett, in addition to appearing in Smyrna, My Beloved. Her other television credits include playing Ioulia in Revenge Games, a Greek remake of the British television drama series Doctor Foster, playing Sofia Romano in Kabul., and appearing as Bromie in the second season of The Sandman on Netflix.

She has also done voice work, most notably playing Modesty Blaise in a series of adaptations for BBC Radio 4, and voicing various characters in video game Assassin's Creed Odyssey.

== Filmography ==
=== Film ===
Year	Title	Role	Notes	Ref.
2009	The Fourth Kind	Theresa		
2010	The Ghost Writer	Connie		
2011	The Palace	Stella	Short film	
2011	Mesocafé	Bisan		
2013	Push	Dreamer	Short film	
2015	Always in the Present	Florence		
2018	Welcome Home	Young Woman		
2019	Siege on Liperti Street	Mrs P		
2019	Music to Die For	Royal Marine SNCO / Radio Announcer	Short film	
2021	Beckett	Thalia Symon		
2021	First Swim	Daphne	Short film	
2021	A Girls	Mum	Short film	
2021	Smyrna, My Beloved	Katina Horton		
2022	The Impact	Royal Marine SNCO		
2023	Minore	Aliki		
2023	Sergeant	Amy		
2023	My Big Fat Greek Wedding 3	Yeni Alvarez		
2024	The Hunted	Victoria		
2024	Murphy's Law	Anna		
2024	Loose Strands	Irini	Short film	
2025	Pomegranate	Tatevik	Short film	
2025	One Night in Bath	Jennifer		
2025	Maricel	Dimitra		
2025	The Christmas Carols	Timothea		

=== Television ===
Year	Title	Role	Notes	Ref.
2006	The Amazing Mrs Pritchard	Janita	Episode: "Episode 3"	
2006	Dream Team	Gabrielle Taylor	Recurring role; 2 episodes	
2007	Casualty	Nadia Talianos	Series regular; 37 episodes	
2008	House of Saddam	Sara	Episode: "Part IV"	
2010	Doctors	Kate Nichols	Episode: "Fire and Water"	
2023	Zoe	Nina	Episode: "Salome"	
2025	Revenge Games	Ioulia	Recurring role	
2025	Kabul	Pilot Sofia Romano	Recurring role; 5 episodes	
2025	The Sandman	Bromie	Episode: "The Song of Orpheus"	

=== Radio ===
Year	Title	Role	Notes
2012	A Taste for Death	Modesty Blaise	BBC Radio 4 15-minute Drama
2014	Modesty Blaise	Modesty Blaise	BBC Radio 4 15-minute Drama
2017	The Silver Mistress	Modesty Blaise	BBC Radio 4 15-minute Drama

=== Video games ===
Year	Title	Role	Notes
2012	Project Zero 2: Wii Edition	Mio Amakura	
2018	Assassin's Creed Odyssey	Anthousa/Greek Civilian	
2020	Dreams	Laila	
2022	Expeditions: Rome	Zenobia/Xenoclea/Aurelia Cotta	
2022	Babylon's Fall	Background Voices	English version

== Theatre credits ==
Year	Title	Role	Venue	Notes	Ref.
2009	The Sea at Night	Leticia	Hackney Empire, London		
2010	Hippolytus	Artemis	White Bear Theatre, London		
2011	Change	Various (Lead)	Arcola Theatre, London		
2011	Lust and Found	Fidan	Arcola Theatre, London		
2012	A Slight Risk	Isobel	Skali Amphitheater, Nicosia		
2013	Hidden in the Sand	Sophia Green	Trafalgar Studios, London		
2013	Mare Rider	Claire	Arcola Theatre, London		
2014	Little Stitches	Flight Attendant / Activist	Theatre503, London		
2015	Camelot: The Shining City	Elaine	Crucible Theatre, Sheffield		
2015–2016	City Stories - Tales of Love and Magic in London	Audrey / Ruth / Anna	St James' Theatre, London; Oxford Playhouse, Oxford; Wilton's Music Hall, London; 59E59 Theaters, New York		
2017	A Colder Water Than Here	Irena	The Vaults, London		
