= I, Lucifer (O'Donnell novel) =

1967 novel by Peter O'Donnell

- Hardcover first edition, 1967, Souvenir Press
- Author: Peter O'Donnell
- Language: English
- Series: Modesty Blaise
- Genre: Spy fiction
- Publisher: Souvenir Press (UK); Doubleday (US)
- Publication date: 1967
- Publication place: United Kingdom
- Media type: Print (hardback and paperback)
- Pages: 318 (first edition, hardback)
- ISBN: 0-285-50060-0 (first edition, hardback)
- Preceded by: Sabre-Tooth
- Followed by: A Taste for Death

I, Lucifer is an action-adventure novel by Peter O'Donnell first published in 1967, featuring the character of Modesty Blaise, whom O'Donnell had created for a comic strip several years earlier. It was the third novel to feature the character.

I, Lucifer introduces parapsychology, a theme that would recur in later books in the Modesty Blaise series; Willie Garvin has the ability to predict danger by his ears prickling, and a villain has the ability to predict future events. The novel also introduces the secondary character Steven Collier, a parapsychologist, who makes numerous future appearances in both the comic strip and the novels. The titular character, depicted as an insane young man who believes himself to be the overlord of the underworld, demonstrates the ability to predict natural deaths.

== Plot summary ==
Modesty Blaise and Willie Garvin are in Paris. Modesty is invited to dinner by René Vaubois, head of the Deuxième Bureau (the French Intelligence Service), on a floating restaurant on the Seine. René asks Modesty for advice regarding a case. High-level people worldwide are receiving death threats, and those who don't pay a ransom end up dead. Most of the deaths are revealed to be natural.

Willie, waiting on the river bank for Modesty's return, encounters Chuli, a criminal whose speciality is planting bombs. Vaubois' car has been wired with explosives. When Modesty, Willie, Vaubois, and Stephen Collier leave the scene, they are followed by a car full of underworld killers, trying to take down Vaubois.

Lucifer, a young man with a ruined mind who had been studying to go into the church when he was seduced by a woman and suffered a nervous breakdown, becoming convinced that he was the source of all sin, the devil himself. A pair of aging puppeteers, Seff and Regina, unable to get work when the music halls closed down, turned to crime. After discovering Lucifer's ability to predict natural deaths, Seff has created a worldwide protection racket.

Modesty is taken prisoner at their base on Sylt and a radio-controlled cyanide capsule is surgically implanted under her skin. The final confrontation takes place on a remote island in the Philippines. Modesty and Willie are forced to fight a duel to the death against each other. Later in a major battle, Modesty risks everything to try to save Lucifer.

== Reception ==
A reviewer in The State found that the author had "woven a story of genuine excitement" with the book and that "readers of suspense fiction [could] count on a ferociously and fabulously good time."
