= Neville Colvin =

New Zealand cartoonist and illustrator

Neville Maurice Colvin (17 December 1918, Dunedin – 1 September 1991, London) was a New Zealand-born cartoonist and illustrator. Dr Warren Feeney has referred to him as "alongside [David] Low [...] undoubtedly New Zealand's most famous international illustrator".

== Early life ==
Colvin was born in Dunedin and educated at Otago Boys' High School. His skill in illustration and satire were already evident at high school, where he contributed cartoons and caricatures to the school's quarterly magazine. His school career appears to have been successful: "He was a member of the first eleven cricket team and a scholar in English, Chemistry and Latin, as well as a regimental sergeant-major of the cadet corps and head boy in his final year." He attended the Dunedin Training College between 1938 and 1940, training to be a teacher and studying for an arts degree.

== Career ==
Colvin volunteered for World War II, initially training as a commando in Australia before being conscripted into the Second Expeditionary Forces (2NZEF). He arrived in Egypt in October 1941, working as a draughtsman. When Peter McIntyre took on the role of war artist, Colvin took over his role as 'camp humorist', contributing regular cartoons to the 2NZEF Times. It was during this time that he developed the soldier characters Johnny Enzed and Fred Clueless. The latter has been described by Ian F Grant as, alongside Gordon Minhinnick's Soldier Sam, New Zealanders' 'best-loved cartoon characters' during the War.

Colvin's reputation as a cartoonist was well established through is work on the 2NZEF Times when he returned to New Zealand. He took up the high-profile role of editorial cartoonist for the Evening Post in 1946, a post he held until 1956.

Colvin emigrated to England in 1956, having become 'increasingly frustrated with criticism of his work by senior staff at the Evening Post' and, more generally, with the stifling environment of 1950s New Zealand. He soon found work on Fleet Street, working for the News Chronicle, Daily Telegraph, News of the World, the Daily Sketch, the Daily Express, and the Sunday Express. He branched out into serialized newspaper strips in the 1960s, working on a number of titles before, most famously, working on the comic strip Modesty Blaise. Between 1980 and 1986, he drew the daily Modesty Blaise strip, drawing approximately 1902 strips.
