= Cobra Trap =

1996 book by Peter O'Donnell

- Hardcover first edition, 1996, Souvenir Press, featuring Jim Holdaway's original cover art.
- Author: Peter O'Donnell
- Cover artist: Jim Holdaway
- Language: English
- Series: Modesty Blaise
- Genre: Spy fiction
- Publisher: Souvenir Press
- Publication date: 1996
- Publication place: United Kingdom
- Media type: Print (hardback and paperback)
- ISBN: 0-285-63332-5
- OCLC: 35709600
- Preceded by: Dead Man's Handle
- Followed by: Final book of series

Cobra Trap is a short story collection by Peter O'Donnell featuring his action/adventure heroine Modesty Blaise. The book was published in 1996, and is the thirteenth, and final book in the Modesty Blaise series which began in 1965. Cobra Trap was released 11 years after the previous book in the series, Dead Man's Handle. It was the final book to be written by O'Donnell before his death in 2010.

== Contents ==
The stories featured in the collection are "Bellman", "The Dark Angels", "Old Alex", "The Girl With the Black Balloon" and "Cobra Trap". "Bellman" is an adaptation of the 1968 comic strip serial "The Killing Ground".

All five stories take place at different times in the life of Modesty Blaise. The first, "Bellman", begins with a flashback to when Modesty is 20 years old. In "The Dark Angels" Modesty is in her late 20s, in "Old Alex" she is in her early 30s, in "The Girl With the Black Balloon" she is in her late 30s, and finally in "Cobra Trap", she is about 52. Ages are approximate because they are not specified and Modesty does not know her exact age.

In "Old Alex", O'Donnell makes it clear that fictional Modesty has a different rate of ageing than real people. The "Old Alex" story is set in 1997, so assuming that stories in the first books took place around 1965–1970, then Blaise aged something like eight years during an actual 30-year period.

"Cobra Trap", the title piece of the collection, is (among fans) the most controversial Modesty Blaise story, in that it profiles the final mission of Modesty and her partner, Willie Garvin. The story takes place 10–15 years after the time frame of the comic strip/novels. Modesty, who has been recently diagnosed with an inoperable brain tumor and given only a short time to live, chooses to give her life to save a train full of innocents, including many children, from a group of rebels. Soon after revealing her illness to Willie, Modesty is killed in an attack, and shortly after that Willie too is shot dead. The story ends with the two friends reuniting in some form of (walkabout-like) afterlife.

When Peter O'Donnell brought his comic strip to a close five years later he chose to do so with a more upbeat story promising future adventures. In addition, the literary canon does not exist in the same continuity as the comic strip (owing to situations and characters differing.)

In 2002, a comic book adaptation of "The Dark Angels" was published in Sweden as a postscript to the British Modesty Blaise daily strip; Enrique Badia Romero, the final artist on the Evening Standard comic strip, adapted the story for the publication. To date its only English-language publication has been in the American magazine Comics Revue.

Elements of several other stories (in particular "Old Alex" and "Bellman") also appeared in the comic strip prior to being featured in Cobra Trap.

The original first edition cover art for Cobra Trap was a painting of Modesty Blaise by Jim Holdaway, who had drawn the original comic strip for O'Donnell from 1963 until his death in 1970.

Cobra Trap was at one point considered one of the rarest of the Modesty Blaise book series as it is the only one that was not initially made available in paperback and the hardcover editions went out of print and are considered collectables. However, Souvenir Press released a paperback edition of the collection in 2006, 10 years after the hardcover release, putting the book into wide circulation again.
