= Modesty Blaise =

British comic strip

- Cover of the first US printing of the Modesty Blaise novel
- Author: Peter O'Donnell
- Illustrator(s): Jim Holdaway, Enrique Badia Romero, John M. Burns, Patrick Wright, Neville Colvin, Dan Spiegle, Dick Giordano
- Current status/schedule: Finished
- Launch date: 13 May 1963
- End date: 7 July 2002
- Syndicate(s): Hall Syndicate (1966–1967); Los Angeles Times Syndicate (1976–1980)
- Genre: Adventure

Modesty Blaise is a British comic strip featuring a fictional character of the same name, created by author Peter O'Donnell and illustrator Jim Holdaway in 1963. The strip follows Modesty Blaise, an exceptional young woman with many talents and a criminal past, and her trusty sidekick Willie Garvin. It was adapted into films in 1966, 1982, and 2003, and from 1965 onwards, 11 novels and two short-story collections were written.

== Fictional character biography ==
In 1945, a nameless girl escapes from a displaced person (DP) camp in Kalyros, Greece. She remembers nothing from her short past and wanders through post-World War II Mediterranean, the Middle East, and regions of North Africa, where she learns to survive the hard way. She befriends Lob, another wandering refugee, who is a Jewish Hungarian scholar from Budapest. He gives her an education and a first name: Modesty. Sometime later, Modesty chooses her last name, Blaise, after Merlin's tutor from the Arthurian legends. When Lob dies is unclear, other than it being prior to her going to Tangier. "The Xanadu Talisman" mentions that Modesty has left Lob at a village to recover from a wound. In the introductory story, “In the Beginning”, she buries him in the desert, crying for the first time since her childhood. In 1953, she takes control of a criminal gang in Tangier from Henri Louche and expands it into an international organization called The Network.

During the years that she runs The Network, she meets Willie Garvin. Despite his desperate lifestyle, she sees his potential and offers him a job. Inspired by her belief in him, he pulls through as her right-hand man in The Network and becomes Modesty's most trusted friend. Theirs is a strictly platonic relationship, based on mutual respect and shared interests. He always calls her "Princess", a form of address only he is allowed to use. Other members of The Network call Modesty "Mam'selle" (as in the French term "Mademoiselle" or "Miss"). Though their relationship has no sexual element, Modesty's various lovers invariably treat Willie with frustrated envy, as he is the only man who remains vital to her life, while lovers come and go. By the same token, some of Willie's girlfriends are initially jealous of Modesty, but later come to understand how the dynamic between them works (as in the case of Lady Janet).

She obtains British nationality by marrying for convenience and divorcing an Englishman in Beirut; the husband (James Turner) dies a year later of alcoholism. Having made a point of not dealing in secrets belonging to H.M. government, when she feels she has made enough money, she retires and moves to England and Willie Garvin follows suit. Bored by their new lives among the idle rich, they accept a request for assistance from Sir Gerald Tarrant, a high-ranking official of the British Secret Service. This is where the story really begins, although it is treated differently in the first comic strip and the first book. Modesty's fortune is estimated at £500,000 as of 1963 (over £8.84 million in 2020). She lives in a penthouse in London overlooking Hyde Park, and also owns a villa in Tangier and a cottage two miles from Benildon, Wiltshire. She is 5 feet 6 inches (168 cm) tall and weighs 120 lb (54 kg) as revealed in La Machine.

Many of her adventures are based on capers in which Willie Garvin and she become involved as a result of their association with Tarrant. However, they may also help perfect strangers or fight various eccentric villains in exotic locations of their own volition if the cause fits their values; "ghosts" from their Network past also emerge to haunt them from time to time. Although Modesty and Willie do not hesitate to kill if necessary, they avoid deadly force whenever possible, often relying upon their extraordinary physical combat and weapons skills. There are many occasions in the comic strip and novels where the two decide ahead of time - with the final say up to Modesty - whether to use deadly force ("for keeps") or less-lethal methods ("for sleeps") depending on the level of the perceived threat.

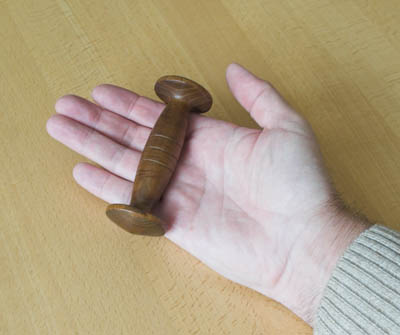
A dumbbell-shaped yawara stick, or "kongo" as it is called in the Modesty Blaise books and comic strips

In Willie and Modesty's fights, great emphasis is placed on unarmed combat and unusual weapons. Modesty's weapon of choice is a kongo or yawara stick (which she often disguises either tied up in her hair or as a detachable clasp on her handbag), and as for firearms she begins by preferring the Colt .32 revolver and Mab Brevete .32 ACP auto pistol, although in later books, she switches to carrying a Star PD .45 auto pistol. Willie's preferred weapon is the throwing knife, of which he usually carries two. Many other strange weapons (such as the quarterstaff, épée, blowgun, and sling) and unexpected fighting techniques are also featured.

In keeping with the "floating timeline" spirit of other long-running comic strip and literary characters, Modesty and Willie generally do not age over the decades, with Modesty always being depicted as being in her late 20s and Willie eight years older. The only exceptions to this rule occur in the comic strip origin story, "In the Beginning"; the 1996 short-story collection Cobra Trap, the final Modesty Blaise book, which contains five stories that take place where Modesty's age moves from 20 to 52 (approximately); and the 2003 film My Name Is Modesty, which is a prequel depicting Modesty in her late teens.

== Comic strip ==
Having conceived the idea after a chance meeting with a girl during his wartime service in the Middle East, O'Donnell elected to work with Jim Holdaway, with whom he had worked on the strip Romeo Brown, after a trial period of collaboration with Frank Hampson, creator of Dan Dare, left O'Donnell dissatisfied. Modesty Blaise debuted in the London Evening Standard on 13 May 1963. The strip was syndicated among a large number of newspapers ranging from the Johannesburg Star to the Detroit Free Press, the Bombay Samachar, The Telegraph (Calcutta, India), The Star (Malaysia), The West Australian (Perth), The Evening Citizen (Glasgow, Scotland) and the Birmingham Evening Mail (Birmingham, England).

After Jim Holdaway's sudden death in 1970, the art of the strip was provided by Spanish artist Enrique Badía Romero. Eight years later, Romero quit to make time for his own comics projects, and after short attempts by John Burns and Patrick Wright, Neville Colvin drew the strip until 1986. Then Romero returned to the job and continued until the end of the strip.

The strip's circulation in the United States was erratic, in part because of the occasional nude scenes, which were much less acceptable in the US than elsewhere, resulting in a censored version of the strip being circulated. (Modesty occasionally used a tactic that she called the "Nailer," in which she appeared topless, distracting the bad guys long enough to give Willie or herself a chance to incapacitate them.) An example of this censorship appears in the introduction to the 2007 Titan Books reprint volume Death Trap, which illustrated two segments of the story arc, "The Junk Men" that were censored by the Detroit Free Press when it published the strip in 1977; in both cases a screen was drawn over scantily clad images of Willie and Modesty. Reportedly, O'Donnell did not approve of the changes, although they were made by the artist, Romero.

The final Modesty Blaise daily comic strip, #10183. Unlike the printed version, the original art appears without the word balloons. The gist of the dialogue is that Modesty and Willie plan to unearth a treasure (the one left buried at the end of the book A Taste for Death) and anonymously donate it to the Salvation Army, and to take a break from adventuring. The final exchange at sunset: Modesty says, "NO VILLAINS, NO VICTIMS, NO BLOOD SWEAT AND TEARS ... WE'LL TAKE A LITTLE BREAK, WILLIE LOVE, JUST YOU AND ME." Willie replies, "BEST BIT OF ALL, PRINCESS."

The final Modesty Blaise strip ran in the Evening Standard on 11 April 2001. Some of the newspapers that carried the series, feeling that it had become a tradition for their readers, began running it again from the beginning. O'Donnell, to give Romero some additional work, gave the artist permission to adapt one of his short stories ("The Dark Angels") as a comic that was published in the Scandinavian anthology magazine Agent X9 in 2002, later being reprinted in the US in a special issue of Comics Revue.

From 1 December 2008, the Evening Standard, which had stopped including comic strips for some time, republished La Machine, using the original artwork. Following a change of ownership of the paper, they did not continue with subsequent stories.

=== Strip numbering ===
The ordinary strips are consecutive numbered from 1 to 10183. Outside this numbering are the two newspaper stories "In the Beginning" and "The Killing Ground" and the two comic-book stories "Modesty Blaise" and "The Dark Angels".

Outside the ordinary numbering is also a quantity of A-strips. An A-strip has the same number as the previous strip, but followed by an A. They were used on days when not all the newspapers running Modesty Blaise were published. An A-strip is not vital for the continuity of the story and is often just supplementing the previous strip.

The first A-strip was 194A and was published during Christmas 1963 in Scottish newspapers.

Since December 1974, The Evening Standard has not been published on Saturdays. So, since then, and the story "Cry Wolf", a sixth of the strips have been A-strips and have not had their premiere in The Evening Standard.

A single strip is numbered with an X suffix, strip number 3641X, and is similar to the A-strips.

== Reprints and comic book adaptations ==
Many reprint editions of the comic strip have appeared over the years, of varying quality. Most reprint the earliest strips, with strips from the 1980s and 1990s being the least often reprinted.

In Sweden the strip has been in continuous distribution since 1971 in a monthly comic adventure magazine called Agent X9 (previously, Modesty had her own comic magazine Agent Modesty Blaise in Sweden from 1967 to 1970). Many of O'Donnell's stories premiered here (translated into Swedish), and the magazine continues to run a Modesty Blaise story every month, from the archives. When the daily strip was discontinued, artist Romero was given permission by O'Donnell to do a final Modesty Blaise story directly for Agent X9 magazine. The two-parter was published in 2002 and based on an unused script by O'Donnell entitled The Dark Angels, which O'Donnell had previously adapted for the short story collection Cobra Trap. Romero also contributed original painted covers for the Agent X9 magazine for many years.

In India Modesty has acquired a huge fan base and the stories have been published in various magazines starting in 1971. Modesty was featured in Kalki Magazine (1971), Kumudam Magazine (1972), Muthu Comics (1975), Lion Comics (1984 to date), Rani Comics (1990–2002) & Comic World (1998) in the Tamil language. They were also published in English in Spectrum Comics (1985–1986). Though other magazines stopped/ceased publishing Modesty Blaise, Lion Comics continues to publish her stories regularly. Considering the medium, certain images from the stories were edited to make them suitable for child readers.

One of the earliest reprints in book form occurred in 1978 when Star Books—an imprint of WH Allen Limited—published two paperback-sized compilations of the Holdaway-era stories: 1) "In the Beginning", "The Black Pearl", and "The Vikings", and 2) "La Machine" and "The Long Lever". These reprints suffered from poor reproduction that rendered many panels illegible.

Between 1981 and 1986, Ken Pierce Books Inc. of the United States, in conjunction with Eclipse Comics, published eight volumes of comic book-sized reprints dubbed the First American Edition series. The first four books featured Holdaway-illustrated stories from the 1960s, while the last four featured strips from the early 1980s as illustrated by Neville Colvin. These books also suffered from reproduction problems that resulted in many panels being reprinted too light, making them difficult to read.

In 1994, DC Comics released a graphic novel adaptation of Modesty Blaise (the novel), with art by Dan Spiegle and Dick Giordano (ISBN 1-56389-178-6).

Manuscript Press published two volumes of late-1980s Romero strips in 2003 (Live Bait and Lady in the Dark); it also published all of the stories not reprinted elsewhere in serialised form in its magazine publications Comics Revue and Modesty Blaise Quarterly, the former of which, as noted above, also published The Dark Angels for the first (and, to date, only) time in English. Comics Revue is continuing to reprint Modesty Blaise strips as of 2015, although a planned reprint of The Dark Angels in autumn 2014 was cancelled just before publication when the copyright holders withdrew permission.

The American magazine Comics Revue also continues to reprint the strip, and remains to date the only publisher to have released an English-language version of The Dark Angels.

=== Titan Books old series, 1985–1990 ===
Between 1984 and 1990, Titan Books of England published eight volumes of reprints of strips featuring art by Holdaway and Romero, covering the period 1963 to 1974. All of the covers were drawn by John M. Burns.

No.	Title	Published date	ISBN	Articles
OT1	The Gabriel Set-Up	January 1985	978-0-907610-37-3	Introduction by Peter O'Donnell
OT2	Mister Sun	October 1985	978-0-907610-48-9	"Modesty Blaise Bloopers" by Peter O'Donnell
OT3	The Hell-Makers	August 1986	978-0-907610-58-8	"Modesty Blaise The Film" by Peter O'Donnell
OT4	The Warlords of Phoenix	March 1987	978-0-907610-74-8	Introduction by Peter O'Donnell; photo of Jim Holdaway at work
OT5	Death of a Jester	July 1987	978-0-907610-91-5	Introduction by Peter O'Donnell; photo of Romero and "Dark Angels" script
OT6	The Puppet Master	October 1987	978-1-85286-009-7	Introduction by Peter O'Donnell and reminiscences about his early work
OT7	The Iron God	November 1989	978-1-85286-026-4	Introduction by Peter O'Donnell
OT8	Uncle Happy	October 1990	978-1-85286-328-9	Introduction by Peter O'Donnell

=== Titan Books new series, 2004–2017 ===
Beginning in March 2004, Titan launched a new series of reprint volumes. These new versions use larger images and reportedly come from better source material than the editions published between 1984 and 1990.

As well as an introduction to each story by Peter O'Donnell (books 1 to 16), Lawrence Blackmore (books 17 to 24), Simon Ward (book 25), Rick Norwood (book 26), Rebecca Chance (book 28), and Daphne Alexander and Kate McAll (book 30), most books include articles about the series. The individual story introductions are absent from books 27 and 29.

In October 2017, Titan completed its reprints of the entire newspaper strip run with the final stories from Romero's second tenure. It is not yet known if the company has the rights to reprint "The Dark Angels", a graphic novel-length story that was published in a European magazine after the retirement of the original strip, or the 1994 graphic novel adaptation of the first Modesty Blaise novel published by DC Comics.

No.	Title	Year	ISBN	Articles
T1	The Gabriel Set-Up	2004	978-1-84023-658-3	"Blaise of Glory" Pt 1 by Mike Paterson and "Girl Walking" by Peter O'Donnell
T2	Mister Sun	2004	978-1-84023-721-4	"Blaise of Glory" Pt 2 and "Modesty Maker" Pt 1, an interview with Peter O'Donnell
T3	Top Traitor	2004	978-1-84023-684-2	"Blaise of Glory" Pt 3 and "Modesty Maker" Pt 2
T4	The Black Pearl	2004	978-1-84023-842-6	"Modesty's Sisters – The Madeleine Brent Novels" Pt 1 and "Modesty Maker" Pt 3; includes examples of Frank Hampson's rejected artwork.
T5	Bad Suki	2005	978-1-84023-864-8	"A Few Words about a Man I Never Met" about Jim Holdaway by Walter Simonson and "Modesty's Sisters" Pt 2
T6	The Hell Makers	2005	978-1-84023-865-5	"Modesty Blaise Doesn't Go To America" by Max Allan Collins, "Jim and Enric" by Peter O'Donnell, Holdaway's illustrations for the "Pieces of Modesty" book, and Pt 1 of a 1973 Comic Media interview with Peter O'Donnell by Nick Landau and Richard Burton
T7	The Green-Eyed Monster	2005	978-1-84023-866-2	A profile of Enric Badia Romero
T8	The Puppet Master	2006	978-1-84023-867-9	"Two Genuine Originals" by Jan Burke and "The Secret Weapons of a Femme Fatale" by Rob van der Nol
T9	The Gallows Bird	2006	978-1-84023-868-6	"Blue Bird – The Censoring of The Gallows Bird"
T10	Cry Wolf	2006	978-1-84023-869-3	"The Truth behind Modesty Plays" by Russell Mael and Pt 2 of the 1973 Comic Media interview with Peter O'Donnell
T11	The Inca Trail	2007	978-1-84576-417-3	Pt 3 of the 1973 Comic Media interview with Peter O'Donnell; includes examples of Frank Hampson's rejected artwork.
T12	Death Trap	2007	978-1-84576-418-0	"Preserving Modesty's Modesty" by Lawrence Blackmore
T13	Yellowstone Booty	2008	978-1-84576-419-7	"The Art of John Burns" by Lawrence Blackmore, including Burns' illustrations for the first Modesty Blaise novel
T14	Green Cobra	2008	978-1-84576-420-3	"Naked Truth" by Lawrence Blackmore and Burns' illustrations for "Pieces of Modesty"
T15	The Lady Killers	2009	978-1-84856-106-9	"Modesty McBlaise: The Glasgow Story" by Lawrence Blackmore (strips that only appeared in the Glasgow Evening Citizen)
T16	The Scarlet Maiden	2009	978-1-84856-107-6	"Modesty McBlaise" Pt 2 by Lawrence Blackmore. Final volume to feature introductions by O'Donnell.
T17	Death in Slow Motion	2010	978-1-84856-108-3	"Portrait of an Artist – Neville Colvin: An Appreciation" by Steve Epting
T18	Sweet Caroline	2010	978-1-84856-673-6	– no additional articles
T19	The Double Agent	2011	978-1-84856-674-3	"A Tribute to Peter O'Donnell" – short pieces by eleven writers and illustrators (first volume compiled since the death of O'Donnell in 2010); "A Modest Man" by Wallace Harrington, describing Neville Colvin
T20	Million Dollar Game	2011	978-1-84856-675-0	– no additional articles
T21	Live Bait	2012	978-0-85768-668-8	"O'Donnell's Circus" by Lawrence Blackmore
T22	Lady in the Dark	2012	978-0-85768-693-0	– no additional articles
T23	The Girl in the Iron Mask	2013	978-0-85768-694-7	– no additional articles
T24	The Young Mistress	2014	978-1-78116-709-0	– no additional articles
T25	The Grim Joker	2014	978-1-78116-711-3	– no additional articles
T26	The Killing Distance	2015	978-1-78116-712-0	– no additional articles
T27	Ripper Jax	2016	978-1-78329-858-7	"Modest Morality" by Simon Barnes
T28	The Murder Frame	2016	978-1-78329-859-4	"Meeting Modesty" by Rebecca Chance
T29	Children of Lucifer	2017	978-1-78329-860-0	"Modesty Blaise: An Icon For Our Time" by Stef Penney
T30	The Killing Game	2017	978-1-78565-300-1	"Modesty and Me" by Paul Michael and "All in the Mind" by Peter O'Donnell

== Story list ==
There were 99 storylines produced for the Modesty Blaise comic strip and all its printed forms over almost forty years, and every story was written solely by Peter O'Donnell. The strips and comic books were drawn by Jim Holdaway (JH), Enrique Badia Romero (ER), John M. Burns (JB), Patrick Wright (PW), Neville Colvin (NC), Dan Spiegle (DS) and Dick Giordano (DG).

Sources: A (Comics Revue Annual), C (Comics Revue), CM (Comic Media Vol 2, No. 2), CS (Comics Revue Special), F# (First American Edition Series, Ken Pierce), LB (Live Bait, Manuscript Press), LD (Lady in the Dark, Manuscript Press), MB (Comics Revue Presents Modesty Blaise), S# (Star Books paperback reprints, 1978), OT# (Titan Books, old series (1984–90)), T# (Titan Books, new series (2004–2017)).

The Modesty Blaise comic strip and comic book stories
No.	Title	Artist	Strip No.	No. of strips	Dates	Reprinted in
1	La Machine	Jim; Holdaway	1–114	114	1963-05-13 – 1963-09-21	T1, OT1, C 189–191, 193, S2
2	The Long Lever	Jim; Holdaway	115–211	98	1963-09-23 – 1964-01-02	T1, OT1, C 192–194, S2
3	The Gabriel Set-Up	Jim; Holdaway	212–354	143	1964-01-03 – 1964-06-18	T1, OT1, C 195–197
4	Mister Sun	Jim; Holdaway	355–500	146	1964-06-19 – 1964-12-05	T2, OT2, C 198–199
5	The Mind of Mrs. Drake	Jim; Holdaway	501–612	113 (112+1A)	1964-12-07 – 1965-04-19	T2, OT2, F2, C 201–203
6	Uncle Happy	Jim; Holdaway	613–743	131	1965-04-20 – 1965-09-18	T2, OT8, F2, C 204–207
7	Top Traitor	Jim; Holdaway	744–873	131	1965-09-20 – 1966-02-19	T3, F1, C 208–210
8	The Vikings	Jim; Holdaway	874–992	119	1966-02-21 – 1966-07-09	T3, F1, S1
(1)	In the Beginning	Jim; Holdaway	1–12	12	1966-07-11 – 1966-07-23	T1, OT1, C 188, CM, S1
9	The Head Girls	Jim; Holdaway	993–1124	132	1966-07-11 – 1966-12-10	T3, F4
10	The Black Pearl	Jim; Holdaway	1125–1235	112 (111+1A)	1966-12-12 – 1967-04-22	T4, F4, S1
11	The Magnified Man	Jim; Holdaway	1236–1349	114	1967-04-24 – 1967-09-02	T4, F4
12	The Jericho Caper	Jim; Holdaway	1350–1461	113 (112+1A)	1967-09-04 – 1968-01-13	T4, F3
13	Bad Suki	Jim; Holdaway	1462–1574	113	1968-01-15 – 1968-05-25	T5, OT8, F3
14	The Galley Slaves	Jim; Holdaway	1575–1629; 1630A-1688	115 (114+1A)	1968-05-27 – 1968-08-06; 1968-09-11 – 1968-11-16	T5, OT3, MB24
(2)	The Killing Ground	Jim; Holdaway	A1-A36	36	1968-10-07 – 1968-11-16	T4, OT2, F3, C 207
15	The Red Gryphon	Jim; Holdaway	1689–1794	107 (106+1A)	1968-11-18 – 1969-03-22	T5, OT3, C 211–213
16	The Hell Makers	Jim; Holdaway	1795–1919	126 (125+1A)	1969-03-24 – 1969-08-16	T6, OT3, C 214–216
17	Take-Over	Jim; Holdaway	1920–2043	125 (124+1A)	1969-08-18 – 1970-01-10	T6, OT4, C 217–219
18	The War-Lords of Phoenix	Jim; Holdaway	2044–2099; 2099–2162	119	1970-01-12 – 1970-03-17; 1970-03-17 – 1970-05-30	T6, OT4, C 220–222
18	The War-Lords of Phoenix	Enric; Badía; Romero	2044–2099; 2099–2162	119	1970-01-12 – 1970-03-17; 1970-03-17 – 1970-05-30	T6, OT4, C 220–222
19	Willie the Djinn	Enric; Badía; Romero	2163–2282	120	1970-06-01 – 1970-10-17	T7, OT4, C 223–225
20	The Green-Eyed Monster	Enric; Badía; Romero	2283–2388	107 (106+1A)	1970-10-19 – 1971-02-20	T7, OT5, C 226–228
21	Death of a Jester	Enric; Badía; Romero	2389–2507	119	1971-02-22 – 1971-07-10	T7, OT5, C 229–231
22	The Stone Age Caper	Enric; Badía; Romero	2508–2627	120	1971-07-12 – 1971-11-27	T8, OT5, C 232–234
23	The Puppet Master	Enric; Badía; Romero	2628–2738	112 (111+1A)	1971-11-29 – 1972-04-08	T8, OT6, C 235–237
24	With Love from Rufus	Enric; Badía; Romero	2739–2846	108	1972-04-10 – 1972-08-12	T8, OT6
25	The Bluebeard Affair	Enric; Badía; Romero	2847–2970	125 (124+1A)	1972-08-14 – 1973-01-06	T9, OT6
26	The Gallows Bird	Enric; Badía; Romero	2971–3077	107	1973-01-08 – 1973-05-12	T9, MB2
27	The Wicked Gnomes	Enric; Badía; Romero	3078–3197	120	1973-05-14 – 1973-09-29	T9, OT7
28	The Iron God	Enric; Badía; Romero	3198–3309	111	1973-10-01 – 1974-02-09	T9, OT7
29	"Take Me to Your Leader"	Enric; Badía; Romero	3310–3428	120 (119+1A)	1974-02-11 – 1974-07-01	T10, MB3
30	Highland Witch	Enric; Badía; Romero	3429–3548	120	1974-07-02 – 1974-11-16	T10, MB4
31	Cry Wolf	Enric; Badía; Romero	3549–3638A	106 (90+16A)	1974-11-18 – 1975-03-25	T10, MB5
32	The Reluctant Chaperon	Enric; Badía; Romero	3639–3737	120 (99+21A)	1975-03-26 – 1975-08-14	T11, MB6
33	The Greenwood Maid	Enric; Badía; Romero	3738–3829A	111 (92+19A)	1975-08-15 – 1976-01-02	T11, MB7
34	Those About to Die	Enric; Badía; Romero	3830–3931A	123 (102+21A)	1976-01-05 – 1976-05-28	T11, MB8
35	The Inca Trail	Enric; Badía; Romero	3932–4031A	120 (100+20A)	1976-06-01 – 1976-10-20	T11, MB10
36	The Vanishing Dollybirds	Enric; Badía; Romero	4032–4141A	132 (110+22A)	1976-10-21 – 1977-03-28	T12, MB11
37	The Junk Men	Enric; Badía; Romero	4142–4241A	120 (100+20A)	1977-03-29 – 1977-08-19	T12, MB9
38	Death Trap	Enric; Badía; Romero	4242–4341A	120 (100+20A)	1977-08-22 – 1978-01-20	T12, MB12
39	Idaho George	Enric; Badía; Romero	4342–4447A	126 (106+20A)	1978-01-23 – 1978-06-16	T13, MB13
40	The Golden Frog	Enric; Badía; Romero	4448–4542A	114 (95+19A)	1978-06-19 – 1978-10-31	T13, MB14
41	Yellowstone Booty	John; Burns	4543–4647A	126 (105+21A)	1978-11-01 – 1979-03-30	T13, MB16
42	Green Cobra	John; Burns	4648–4737A	108 (90+18A)	1979-04-02 – 1979-08-10	T14, MB15
43	Eve and Adam	John; Burns	4738-4767A; 4768-4837A	120 (100+20A)	1979-08-13 – 1979-11-24; 1979-11-25 – 1980-01-04	T14, MB17
43	Eve and Adam	Patrick; Wright	4738-4767A; 4768-4837A	120 (100+20A)	1979-08-13 – 1979-11-24; 1979-11-25 – 1980-01-04	T14, MB17
44	Brethren of Blaise	Patrick; Wright	4838–4932A	114 (95+19A)	1980-01-07 – 1980-05-23	T14, MB18
45	Dossier on Pluto	Neville; Colvin	4933–5032A	120 (100+20A)	1980-05-27 – 1980-10-14	T15, MB19
46	The Lady Killers	Neville; Colvin	5033–5127A	114 (95+19A)	1980-10-15 – 1981-03-03	T15, F5, C 238–240
47	Garvin's Travels	Neville; Colvin	5128–5229A	120 (102+18A)	1981-03-04 – 1981-07-27	T15, F5, C 241–243
48	The Scarlet Maiden	Neville; Colvin	5230–5329A	120 (100+20A)	1981-07-28 – 1981-12-16	T16, F5, C 244–246
49	The Moonman	Neville; Colvin	5330–5424A	114 (95+19A)	1981-12-17 – 1982-05-07	T16, F6, C 247–249
50	A Few Flowers for the Colonel	Neville; Colvin	5425–5519A	114 (95+19A)	1982-05-10 – 1982-09-24	T16, F6, C 250–252
51	The Balloonatic	Neville; Colvin	5520–5619A	120 (100+20A)	1982-09-27 – 1983-02-18	T17, F6, C 253–255
52	Death in Slow Motion	Neville; Colvin	5620–5719A	120 (100+20A)	1983-02-21 – 1983-07-15	T17, F7, C 256–258
53	The Alternative Man	Neville; Colvin	5720–5814A	114 (95+19A)	1983-07-18 – 1983-11-28	T17, F7, C 259–261
54	Sweet Caroline	Neville; Colvin	5815–5914A	120 (100+20A)	1983-11-29 – 1984-04-19	T18, F7, C 262–264
55	The Return of the Mammoth	Neville; Colvin	5915–6014A	120 (100+20A)	1984-04-24 – 1984-09-14	T18, F8, C 265–267
56	Plato's Republic	Neville; Colvin	6015–6114A	120 (100+20A)	1984-09-17 – 1985-02-06	T18, F8
57	The Sword of the Bruce	Neville; Colvin	6115–6214A	120 (100+20A)	1985-02-07 – 1985-07-02	T18, F8
58	The Wild Boar	Neville; Colvin	6215–6314A	120 (100+20A)	1985-07-03 – 1985-11-20	T19, MB20
59	Kali's Disciples	Neville; Colvin	6315–6414A	120 (100+20A)	1985-11-21 – 1986-05-16	T19, MB21
60	The Double Agent	Neville; Colvin	6415–6519A	126 (105+21A)	1986-05-17 – 1986-09-15	T19, MB22
61	Butch Cassidy Rides Again	Enric; Badía; Romero	6520–6624A	126 (105+21A)	1986-09-16 – 1987-02-12	T20, MB1, MB25
62	Million Dollar Game	Enric; Badía; Romero	6625–6724A	120 (100+20A)	1987-02-13 – 1987-07-08	T20, C 26–29
63	The Vampire of Malvescu	Enric; Badía; Romero	6725–6829A	126 (105+21A)	1987-07-09 – 1987-12-03	T20, A2, MB23
64	Samantha and the Cherub	Enric; Badía; Romero	6830–6934A	126 (105+21A)	1987-12-04 – 1988-05-06	T21, C 31–36, LB
65	Milord	Enric; Badía; Romero	6935–7034A	120 (100+20A)	1988-05-09 – 1988-09-27	T21, C 40–42, LB
66	Live Bait	Enric; Badía; Romero	7035–7134A	120 (100+20A)	1988-09-28 – 1989-02-17	T21, C 44–46, LB
67	The Girl from the Future	Enric; Badía; Romero	7135–7239A	126 (105+21A)	1989-02-20 – 1989-07-21	T22, C 47–49, LD
68	The Big Mole	Enric; Badía; Romero	7240–7339A	120 (100+20A)	1989-07-24 – 1989-12-11	T22, C 50–52, LD
69	Lady in the Dark	Enric; Badía; Romero	7340–7439A	120 (100+20A)	1989-12-12 – 1990-05-08	T22, C 53–56, LD
70	Fiona	Enric; Badía; Romero	7440–7544A	126 (105+21A)	1990-05-09 – 1990-10-09	T23, C 57–60
71	Walkabout	Enric; Badía; Romero	7545–7649A	126 (105+21A)	1990-10-10 – 1991-03-11	T23, C 61–63
72	The Girl in the Iron Mask	Enric; Badía; Romero	7650–7749A	120 (100+20A)	1991-03-12 – 1991-08-02	T23, C 64–66
73	The Young Mistress	Enric; Badía; Romero	7750–7854A	126 (105+21A)	1991-08-05 – 1992-01-06	T24, C 67–73
74	Ivory Dancer	Enric; Badía; Romero	7855–7959A	126 (105+21A)	1992-01-07 – 1992-06-05	T24, C 73–77
75	Our Friend Maude	Enric; Badía; Romero	7960–8064A	126 (105+21A)	1992-06-08 – 1992-11-02	T24, C 78–83
76	A Present for the Princess	Enric; Badía; Romero	8065–8174A	132 (110+22A)	1992-11-03 – 1993-04-08	T25, C 84–88
77	Black Queen's Pawn	Enric; Badía; Romero	8175–8279A	126 (105+21A)	1993-04-13 – 1993-09-10	T25, C 89–93
78	The Grim Joker	Enric; Badía; Romero	8280–8384A	126 (105+21A)	1993-09-13 – 1994-02-09	T25, C 94–99
79	Guido the Jinx	Enric; Badía; Romero	8385–8484A	120 (100+20A)	1994-02-10 – 1994-07-05	T26, C 100–104
80	The Killing Distance	Enric; Badía; Romero	8485–8589A	126 (105+21A)	1994-07-06 – 1994-11-30	T26, C 105–109
81	The Aristo	Enric; Badía; Romero	8590–8694A	126 (105+21A)	1994-12-01 – 1995-05-03	T26, C 110–114
(3)	Modesty Blaise	Dan Spiegle & Dick Giordano		(141 pages)	1994-12	
82	Ripper Jax	Enric; Badía; Romero	8695–8799A	126 (105+21A)	1995-05-04 – 1995-10-02	T27, C 115–119
83	The Maori Contract	Enric; Badía; Romero	8800–8904A	126 (105+21A)	1995-10-03 – 1996-03-01	T27, C 120–124
84	Honeygun	Enric; Badía; Romero	8905–9009A	126 (105+21A)	1996-03-04 – 1996-08-02	T27, C 125–130
85	Durango	Enric; Badía; Romero	9010–9114A	126 (105+21A)	1996-08-05 – 1997-01-03	T27, CS, C 131–133
86	The Murder Frame	Enric; Badía; Romero	9115–9219A	126 (105+21A)	1997-01-06 – 1997-06-06	T28, C 134–138
87	Fraser's Story	Enric; Badía; Romero	9220–9324A	126 (105+21A)	1997-06-09 – 1997-11-03	T28, C 139–143
88	Tribute of the Pharaoh	Enric; Badía; Romero	9325–9429A	126 (105+21A)	1997-11-04 – 1998-05-03	T28, C 144–148
89	The Special Orders	Enric; Badía; Romero	9430–9534A	126 (105+21A)	1998-05-06 – 1998-09-04	T28, C 149–152
90	The Hanging Judge	Enric; Badía; Romero	9535–9644A	132 (110+22A)	1998-09-07 – 1999-02-10	T29 C 153–158
91	Children of Lucifer	Enric; Badía; Romero	9645–9749A	126 (105+21A)	1999-02-11 – 1999-07-13	T29, C 159–163
92	Death Symbol	Enric; Badía; Romero	9750–9859A	132 (110+22A)	1999-07-14 – 1999-12-15	T29 C 164–169
93	The Last Aristocrat	Enric; Badía; Romero	9860–9964A	126 (105+21A)	1999-12-16 – 2000-05-19	T30 C 170–175
94	The Killing Game	Enric; Badía; Romero	9965–10069A	126 (105+21A)	2000-05-22 – 2000-10-17	T30, C 176–181
95	The Zombie	Enric; Badía; Romero	10070–10183	135 (114+21A)	2000-10-18 – 2001-04-11	T30 C 182–187
(4)	The Dark Angels	Enric; Badía; Romero		(46 pages)	2002-06-13 – 2002-07-11	C 200, 208 (cover), 217 (cover)

=== The special stories ===
1. Numbered SP1 or more commonly 8a. An introduction to the history of Modesty Blaise.
2. Numbered SP2 or more commonly 14a. Produced to Scottish newspapers after an industrial dispute in England.
3. Numbered SP3 or more commonly not numbered. A graphic novel from DC Comics based on the first novel with Modesty Blaise.
4. Numbered SP4 or more commonly 96. A comic book version of the short story in Cobra Trap. Originally published in the Swedish magazine Agent X9 #7–8, 2002.

=== Differences between comic strip and books ===
Although the books generally reflect the characters previously established in the comic strip, there are a number of detail differences. One example of this is how Modesty is initially recruited to work for Sir Gerald Tarrant – although the strip story La Machine (1963) and the book story Modesty Blaise (1965) have similarities, and in both Tarrant achieves his aim by putting her under an obligation, in the strip story this relates to the validity of her marriage (and therefore her right to British nationality and residence) while in the book he provides her with information that enables her to rescue Willie Garvin and save his life. The name of her husband is given in the strip, with the marriage taking place in 1960 and him dying in 1961; in the novel he is unnamed and the marriage took place in 1962. The novels also include a more overt fantasy element than the strip, with characters demonstrating clairvoyant abilities in several novels (including Willie's trademark ability to predict trouble when he feels his ears prickling, a trait also demonstrated in the comic), and a later story referencing the afterlife.

There are also cases where characters first appear in the books and then subsequently appear in the comic strip – Steve Collier first appears in I, Lucifer (1967) and his future wife Dinah in A Taste for Death (1969) but they do not appear in the strip until Lady in the Dark (1989).

== Modesty Blaise Quarterly ==
Comics Revue presents Modesty Blaise was a small press magazine sized comic book published by Manuscript Press which reprinted Modesty Blaise comic strip stories by O'Donnell and illustrated by the artists Jim Holdaway (JH), Enrique Badia Romero (ER), John M. Burns (JB), Patrick Wright (PW), Neville Colvin (NC). It published 25 issues between 1995 and 2000. With issue 23, all the MB stories had been reprinted in either Comics Revue presents Modesty Blaise or Comics Revue, so the contents of the last two issues was decided by reader vote. Issue 24 carried "The Galley Slaves" and 25 reprinted "Butch Cassidy Rides Again".

Comics Revue presents Modesty Blaise
No.	Title	Story #	Artist	Strip numbers	Number of strips	Original publication dates
1	Butch Cassidy Rides Again	61	ER	6520-6624A	126 (105+21A)	1986-09-16 – 1987-02-12
2	The Gallows Bird	26	ER	2971-3077	107	1973-01-08 – 1973-05-12
3	"Take Me to Your Leader"	29	ER	3310-3428	119	1974-02-11 – 1974-07-01
4	Highland Witch	30	ER	3429-3548	120	1974-07-02 – 1974-11-16
5	Cry Wolf	31	ER	3549-3638A	106 (90+16A)	1974-11-18 – 1975-03-25
6	The Reluctant Chaperon	32	ER	3639-3737	120 (99+21A)	1975-03-26 – 1975-08-14
7	The Greenwood Maid	33	ER	3738-3829A	111 (92+19A)	1975-08-15 – 1976-01-02
8	Those About to Die	34	ER	3830-3931A	123 (102+21A)	1976-01-05 – 1976-05-28
9	The Junk Men	37	ER	4142-4241A	120 (100+20A)	1977-03-29 – 1977-08-19
10	The Inca Trail	35	ER	3932-4031A	120 (100+20A)	1976-06-01 – 1976-10-20
11	The Vanishing Dollybirds	36	ER	4032-4141A	132 (110+22A)	1976-10-21 – 1977-03-28
12	Death Trap	38	ER	4242-4341A	120 (100+20A)	1977-08-22 – 1978-01-20
13	Idaho George	39	ER	4342-4447A	126 (106+20A)	1978-01-23 – 1978-06-16
14	The Golden Frog	40	ER	4448-4542A	114 (95+19A)	1978-06-19 – 1978-10-31
15	Green Cobra	42	JB	4648-4737A	108 (90+18A)	1979-04-02 – 1979-08-10
16	Yellowstone Booty	41	JB	4543-4647A	126 (105+21A)	1978-11-01 – 1979-03-30
17	Eve and Adam	43	JB; PW	4738-4767A; 4768-4837A	120 (100+20A)	1979-08-13 – 1979-11-24; 1979-11-25 – 1980-01-04
18	Brethren of Blaise	44	PW	4838-4932A	114 (95+19A)	1980-01-07 – 1980-05-23
19	Dossier on Pluto	45	NC	4933-5032A	120 (100+20A)	1980-05-27 – 1980-10-14
20	The Wild Boar	58	NC	6215-6314A	120 (100+20A)	1985-07-03 – 1985-11-20
21	Kali's Disciples	59	NC	6315-6414A	120 (100+20A)	1985-11-21 – 1986-05-16
22	The Double Agent	60	NC	6515-6519A	126 (105+21A)	1986-05-17 – 1986-09-15
23	The Vampire of Malvescu	63	ER	6725-6829A	126 (105+21A)	1987-07-09 – 1987-12-03
24	The Galley Slaves	14	JH	1575-1629; 1630A-1688	115 (114+1A)	1968-05-27 – 1968-08-06; 1968-09-11 – 1968-11-16
25	Butch Cassidy Rides Again	61	ER	6520-6624A	126 (105+21A)	1986-09-16 – 1987-02-12

== In other media ==
=== Films ===
After the initial popularity of the comic strip, British Lion Films announced a Modesty Blaise film to be written by Sidney Gilliat that was never made.

A 1966 film, Modesty Blaise, loosely based on the comic strip, was created as a comedy thriller. It was directed by Joseph Losey and starred Monica Vitti as Modesty, Terence Stamp as Willie Garvin, and Dirk Bogarde as Gabriel. Peter O'Donnell wrote the first draft of the screenplay for the film, but the script was heavily revised by others before shooting began, and the finished film bore very little resemblance to O'Donnell's vision in tone, theme, or characterisation. For example, a romance is established between Willie and Modesty, even though the comic strip firmly established only a platonic relationship between them. The film also incorporated several musical numbers. One sequence of the film establishes that the Modesty Blaise comic strip exists within the fictional universe of the film and is based upon the exploits of Vitti's character, who is seen dressing up as the illustrated version of herself. The film was unsuccessful.

In 1982, a one-hour television pilot was made for a proposed Modesty Blaise series, starring Ann Turkel as Modesty Blaise and Lewis Van Bergen as Willie Garvin. The film aired on the ABC Network to positive reviews, but no series resulted. This was a slightly more serious version of the stories than the campy 1966 comedy version. In this pilot, the setting is moved from London to Hollywood, and both Willie and Tarrant are portrayed as Americans; Modesty's nationality is left unrevealed, but Turkel speaks with an American accent.

In 2003, a direct-to-video film, My Name Is Modesty, was released under the "Quentin Tarantino Presents..." banner. The film was directed by Scott Spiegel and starred English actress Alexandra Staden as Modesty Blaise (to date the only British actress to play the role on screen). Although promoted as the first of a series, no others were made. One immediately noticeable difference between the film and the source material is that it is a prequel to Modesty's established backstory as a crime boss; as such, the character of Willie Garvin is omitted.

Quentin Tarantino has been interested in directing a Modesty Blaise film for many years, and at one point Neil Gaiman wrote a script treatment based upon O'Donnell's novel, I, Lucifer. So far, nothing has come of these plans. Tarantino "sponsored" the release of My Name Is Modesty by allowing it to be released under the label "Quentin Tarantino presents ..." In the Tarantino film Pulp Fiction, Vincent Vega is seen reading a copy of Modesty Blaise. Nicole Kidman has expressed interest in making a Modesty Blaise film, and Jennifer Lopez was reported to be pitching for the role in 2003.

=== Novels and short story collections ===
O'Donnell was invited to write a novelization of the 1966 film. The novel, released a year before the film itself and based on his original screenplay for the movie, fared considerably better than the film. During the following decades he would write a total of eleven Modesty Blaise novels and two collections of short stories. Several of the short stories either adapt comic strip stories, or would later be adapted into comic strip stories themselves. Characters cross over between the two media. Except for Pieces of Modesty, initially published as a Pan Books paperback, the books were originally issued in hardback (by Souvenir Press) and have subsequently gone through numerous paperback editions, with Pan the primary paperback publisher in the U.K. until the late 1970s.

Modesty Blaise novels and short stories
Year	Book title
1965	Modesty Blaise
1966	Sabre-Tooth
1967	I, Lucifer
1969	A Taste for Death
1971	The Impossible Virgin
1972	Pieces of Modesty (short stories) A Better Day to Die The Giggle-wrecker I Had a Date with Lady Janet A Perfect Night to Break Your Neck Salamander Four The Soo Girl Charity
1973	The Silver Mistress
1976	Last Day in Limbo
1978	Dragon's Claw
1981	The Xanadu Talisman
1982	The Night of Morningstar
1985	Dead Man's Handle
1996	Cobra Trap (short stories) Bellman The Dark Angels Old Alex The Girl With the Black Balloon Cobra Trap

O'Donnell's final book, Cobra Trap, is a short story collection. Intended by O'Donnell to be his literary finale, the final story depicts the deaths of Modesty and Willie (with an implied afterlife). O'Donnell, however, would continue to write the comic strip for several more years, and chose to end it on a more optimistic note, though the comic strip's finale does not contradict the prose version.

Beginning in the early 2000s (decade), Souvenir Press began a series of paperback reprints of the Modesty Blaise book series, using the first edition hardback covers, and originally concluding with a reprint of Cobra Trap in 2006. Souvenir subsequently gained the rights to the short story collection Pieces of Modesty and issued their reprint of that book in March 2010, with a new cover design based on the original hardback cover from the first Modesty novel, at which point all the Blaise books fell under the same UK publisher for the first time.

In 2008, Penguin Books of India reprinted the full series.

The 2012 Charles Stross book The Apocalypse Codex is, according to the author, a tribute to Modesty Blaise.

=== Audio formats ===
Last Day in Limbo was adapted as a BBC World Service six-part radio drama in 1978 with Barbara Kellerman as Modesty, James Bolam as Willie and Richard Vernon as Tarrant.

I Had a Date with Lady Janet (the short story from Pieces of Modesty) was published as an audio tape reading by Pickwick Talking Books in the early 1980s, featuring John Thaw as Willie (the story, uniquely to the canon, is a first-person tale told from Willie Garvin's point of view).

BBC Radio 4 has broadcast adaptations of three of the books in their "15 Minute Drama" slot, each in five fifteen-minute episodes, adapted by Stef Penney and produced/directed by Kate McAll, starring Daphne Alexander as Modesty, with music by Will Gregory, arranged by Ian Gardiner.

A Taste for Death was originally broadcast from 17 to 21 December 2012, featuring Carl Prekopp as Willie and Alun Armstrong as Tarrant, with Sam Dale (Simon Delicata), Geoffrey Streatfeild (Steve Collier), Samantha Dakin (Dinah Pilgrim), Alex Fearns (McWhirter), Jeff Mash (Skeet Lowery) and Nigel Anthony (Sir Howard Presteign).

Modesty Blaise was originally broadcast from 16 to 20 June 2014, featuring Neil Maskell as Willie and Alun Armstrong as Tarrant, with Ewan Bailey (Gabriel), Alex Fearns (McWhirter), Matthew Gravelle, John Hollingworth and Hannah Pakeman.

The Silver Mistress was originally broadcast from 13 to 17 February 2017, featuring Paul Bazely as Willie and Ian McNeice as Tarrant, with Clare Grogan (Clare), Ewan Bailey (Sexton/Colonel Jim), Sara Markland (Lady Janet/Angel) and John Ramm (Quinn).

== References to Modesty Blaise in other popular culture ==
- The theme song "Modesty (Modesty Blaise Theme)" from the Losey movie was sung by David and Jonathan, with music composed by John Dankworth and lyrics by Benny Green. This appeared on the soundtrack album issued by 20th Century Fox (S 4182) and also as a single on the Fontana label. The album was released on CD by Harkit (HRKCD 8003) in 2001.
- The theme song appeared in instrumental form as a mambo by Latin jazz composer and vibist Cal Tjader and collaborator Eddie Palmieri on their 1966 album El Sonido Nuevo (The New Sound).
- Rock group Sparks wrote and recorded a song intended as the theme tune for the aborted TV series. Using an amended title "Modesty Plays" to avoid trademark infringement, it was released originally in 1982 as a France-only single and subsequently in a new version on their 1986 album Music That You Can Dance To. Singer Russell Mael admits that he is actually singing "Blaise" not "Plays".
- Closterkeller, a Polish Gothic band, recorded the song "Modesty Blaise" on their 1992 album Blue, based on the Modesty Blaise character.
- The concept of the 1992 album Modesty by the Yugoslav pop rock band Bel Tempo was inspired by the Modesty Blaise character.
- Montt Mardié from Sweden opens his 2005 debut album Drama with a song entitled "Modesty Blaise".
- British group the Direct Hits released their 4-track EP The Modesty Blaise Sessions on The Forbidden Label in 1986. The first track, "Modesty Blaise", alludes to the character, especially in her comic-strip form.
- In the Quentin Tarantino film Pulp Fiction, hit-man Vincent Vega is twice seen reading the first US printing of the Modesty Blaise novel while seated on the toilet.
- A thinly disguised pair - Persephone Hazard (code-named "Bashful Incendiary") and her companion Johnny McTavish - are in some of Charlie Stross' Laundry series books. She is a witch, he calls her Duchess, they work as external assets of an occult department of the British secret services.

== Controversy ==
On 29 June 2020 strip no. 2548 drew controversy from readers of The West Australian newspaper for its dialogue, in which the villain in the story used offensive language to refer to Indigenous Australians. Strip no. 2548 and the associated story "The Stone Age Caper", has a villain who makes racist statements. The story, which dates from 1981, had previously been published by the newspaper in 2009. At that time, the only complaint about the story was that in one panel Modesty is shown topless. On 30 June 2020 the newspaper made a decision that, after 48 years, it would cease publishing Modesty Blaise.
