= Peter O'Donnell =

English writer

- Born: 11 April 1920 Lewisham, London, England
- Died: 3 May 2010 (aged 90) Brighton, Sussex, England
- Area: Writer
- Pseudonym: Madeleine Brent
- Notable works: Modesty Blaise
- Awards: RoNA Award

Peter O'Donnell (11 April 1920 – 3 May 2010) was an English writer of mysteries and of comic strips, best known as the creator of Modesty Blaise, an action heroine/undercover trouble-shooter. He was also a gothic historical romance novelist who wrote under the female pseudonym Madeleine Brent; in 1978, his novel Merlin's Keep won the Romantic Novel of the Year Award of the Romantic Novelists' Association.

== Biography ==
Born on 11 April 1920 in Lewisham, London, O'Donnell was the son of Bernard O'Donnell, a journalist on the Empire News, and was educated at Catford Central School.

He began to write professionally at the age of 16. In 1938 he joined the British Army, and during the war served as an NCO in mobile radio detachment (3 Corps) of Royal Corps of Signals in the 8th Army. He saw active service in Persia in 1942, after which his unit was moved to Syria, Egypt, the Western Desert, and Italy, and he was with forces that went into Greece in October 1944. After the war, O'Donnell returned to civilian life and began to script comic strips, including an adaptation for the Daily Express of the James Bond novel, Dr. No. From 1953 to 1966 he wrote for Garth, and from 1956 to 1962 Romeo Brown (with Jim Holdaway as an artist).

In addition to the comic strips and graphic novels based on Modesty Blaise, O'Donnell published two collections of short stories and twenty novels. He wrote a play that was widely performed in the 1980s, Mr. Fothergill's Murder, and wrote for television and film. He wrote for women's magazines and children's papers early in his career. His most famous creation, Modesty Blaise, was first published in 1963 in comic strip form. For the first seven years, the strip was illustrated by Holdaway until his death in 1970. Enrique Badia Romero then became the artist, and except for a seven-year period (1979–86) he drew the strip until it ended in 2001.

In 1965, O'Donnell novelized his screenplay for a motion picture version (the final release of which in 1966 used virtually nothing of O'Donnell's original material), which was published as Modesty Blaise. This book was a huge success and O'Donnell would publish a dozen more novels and short story collections until 1996. Kingsley Amis said the novels were "endlessly fascinating" and that Blaise and Garvin were "one of the great partnerships in fiction, bearing comparison with that of Sherlock Holmes and Dr Watson."

At the request of publisher Ernest Hecht, O'Donnell began writing gothic romance and adventure novels under the pen name of Madeleine Brent. The novels are not a series, but feature a variety of strong female protagonists. They are written in first person, take place in the late Victorian era, and although every protagonist has connections to England, part of each book is set in various locations around the world—including China, Australia, Afghanistan, and Mexico. In 2001, O'Donnell retired from writing the Modesty Blaise comic strip (the lead characters having been given a definitive end in the previous Cobra Trap short story collection) and was also said to have retired from full-time writing (in 2002, he gave Romero permission to adapt one of his short stories, "The Dark Angels", to a comic initially published in Scandinavian anthology magazine Agent X9 and later reprinted by Comics Revue magazine in the US). From 2004 to 2009 he wrote the introductions for a series of Modesty Blaise comic strip reprint volumes published by Titan Books; beginning in 2010, just prior to O'Donnell's death, another writer had begun composing these introductions. He was also interviewed for a special feature included on the DVD release of the 2004 film My Name Is Modesty, which was based on his creation.

O'Donnell's wish was that no one else write any future Modesty Blaise stories, but whether this was ever formalized is unknown. With the exception of "The Dark Angels" adaptation and the My Name is Modesty film, no further new productions related to the character have been released as of 2015. In 2007, working with young women students at Bullers Wood and Newstead Wood schools, O'Donnell established an official website, Modesty Blaise, Ltd.

== Death ==
According to his obituary in the Evening Standard, O'Donnell had been suffering from Parkinson's disease in his later years. He died in May 2010, aged 90, in Brighton, Sussex. He is buried in the same grave with his wife, Constance, at Lawn Memorial Cemetery, Warren Road, Woodingdean, Brighton, Sussex.

== Bibliography ==
=== As Peter O'Donnell ===
==== Modesty Blaise book series ====
1. Modesty Blaise (1965)
2. Sabre-Tooth (1966)
3. I, Lucifer (1967)
4. A Taste for Death (1969)
5. The Impossible Virgin (1971)
6. Pieces of Modesty (1972) (short stories)
7. The Silver Mistress (1973)
8. Last Day in Limbo (1976)
9. Dragon's Claw (1978)
10. The Xanadu Talisman (1981)
11. The Night of Morningstar (1982)
12. Dead Man's Handle (1985)
13. Cobra Trap (1996) (short stories)

O'Donnell also wrote romance books and television (Take a Pair of Private Eyes) and movie (Revenge of She) scripts. Mr. Fothergill's Murder first opened on 25 October 1982 at the Duke of York theatre, London, and was published by the English Theatre Guild. Among other places, it was performed at The English Theatre of Hamburg in the 1987–88 season.

=== Madeleine Brent ===
- Tregaron's Daughter (1971)
- Moonraker's Bride (1973)
- Kirkby's Changeling (1975) (also as Stranger at Wildings)
- Merlin's Keep (1977)
- The Capricorn Stone (1979)
- The Long Masquerade (1981)
- A Heritage of Shadows (1983)
- Stormswift (1984)
- Golden Urchin (1986)

== Sources ==
- The Complete Modesty Blaise dossier
- Duke of York Theatre
- The Modesty Blaise Book Site
- Peter O'Donnell at IMDb
- Kristy Valenti's three-part article on Peter O'Donnell - Part one, Part Two and Part Three at comiXology
- Peter O'Donnell's 2001 interview with Publishers Weekly
