= The Tenderness of Wolves (novel) =

2006 novel by Stef Penney

- Author: Stef Penney
- Publisher: Quercus
- Publication date: 2006
- ISBN: 1-905204-81-7
- OCLC: 67375523

The Tenderness of Wolves is a 2006 novel by Stef Penney. It won the 2006 Costa Prize for 'Book of the Year'.

== General Information ==
The book is set in Canada in the 1860s. It starts with the discovery of the murder of a trapper, and then follows various events that occur as the murderer is sought. As Stef Penney suffered from agoraphobia at the time of writing this novel, she did all the research in the libraries of London and never visited Canada. In an Elle Q&A interview, Penney revealed that the inspiration for the novel originated as a screenplay she had written 12 years prior to the novel, which also featured the novel's main character, Mrs. Ross.

The book was serialised on BBC Radio Four at 10:45 BST (repeated at 19:45), from 15 October 2007 daily in 15 minute episodes.

== Plot summary ==
Structurally, The Tenderness of Wolves is divided into four parts: “Disappearance”, “The Fields of Heaven”, “The Winter Partners”, and “The Sickness of Long Thinking”.

The novel opens with the discovery of the murder of a French trapper and trader named Laurent Jammet. Mrs. Ross, the protagonist and first-person narrator of the novel, finds the mysterious trapper in his isolated cabin on the outskirts of settlement called Dove River. Mrs. Ross brings the murder to the attention of the town's magistrate, Andrew Knox, who then calls upon the Hudson's Bay Company to investigate the murder. This brings three men from the company to Dove River: Mackinley, the leader, Donald Moody, an accountant, and Jacob, a native guide who works for the company and who has named himself Moody's personal protector. Mrs. Ross’ son, Francis, also goes missing on the day that Jammet is found.

News of Jammet's unfortunate end travels south as well, bringing it to the attention of Thomas Sturrock, a former journalist and retired searcher whose talents have endeared him to many Indian tribes. His interest in Jammet concerns not so much the man himself but what he possessed. Specifically, Jammet had a small bone tablet with unidentified markings on it in which Sturrock was extremely interested. Sturrock did not have the funds, at the time, to buy it from Jammet, who promised to keep the tablet safe until Sturrock could afford it. Once he hears of the murder, however, Sturrock sets off for Dove River, hoping to discover the fate of the tablet.

The mix of people concerned with the death further expands with the addition of William Parker, who is a half-Native American trapper. Initially, he is suspected of having committed the murder and subsequently detained. He is soon released, however, and then becomes Mrs. Ross's guide in her quest to find her son.

Once all of these characters have been introduced, the novel then follows their respective journeys—and the discoveries they make along the way—through a land gripped by winter.

== Characters ==
- Laurent Jammet – the dead man.
- Mrs. Ross – Protagonist, Francis’ mother.
- Francis Ross – Mrs. Ross’ missing son and a troubled youth.
- Angus Ross – Mrs. Ross’ husband.
- Andrew Knox – Magistrate of Dove River
- Mrs. Knox – Wife of Andrew Knox.
- Susannah Knox – The younger of Mr. Knox's two daughters who is known mostly for her attractiveness.
- Maria Knox – The elder of Mr. Knox's two daughters who is known more for her dry wit.
- Thomas Sturrock – Itinerant searcher and former journalist.
- William Parker – Half-Native American trapper, eventually becomes Mrs. Ross’ guide through the wilderness.
- Donald Moody – Accountant for the Hudson's Bay Company.
- Jacob – Native American guide for the Hudson's Bay Company; Moody's personal protector.
