= Enrique Badía Romero =

Spanish comics artist (1930–2024)

Romero
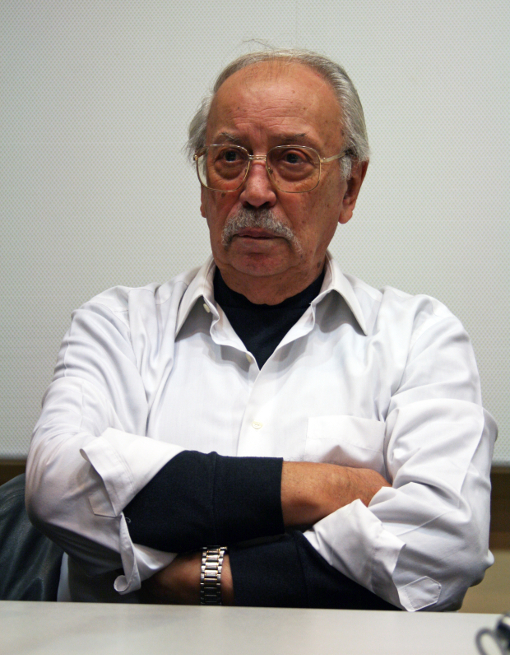
- Born: Enrique Badía Romero; 24 April 1930 Barcelona, Spain
- Died: 15 February 2024 (aged 93)
- Area: Artist
- Pseudonyms: Badia, Enric Romero, Romero
- Notable works: Modesty Blaise; Axa
- Awards: Full list

Enrique Badía Romero (who signed his work simply Romero; 24 April 1930 – 15 February 2024) was a Spanish comics artist, best known to English-speaking audiences for his work on Modesty Blaise. He was also the co-creator of the post-apocalyptic science fiction strip Axa, as well as a substantial body of work in his native Spain.

== Biography ==
Romero's career began at the age of 15 when he was taken on as an apprentice of the artist Emilio Freixas. After contributing to the publication Susy in 1949, he went on to produce artwork for several series under the signature "Badia". He launched the magazine Alex in 1953 and two years later founded the publishing firm Ruiz Romero for which he produced the series Cromos, Hombres de Lucha and Historia de la Guerra.

Enrique Badía Romero often collaborated with his brother Jordi Badía Romero (1938–1984). He died on 15 February 2024, at the age of 93.

=== Modesty Blaise ===
A Romero original from one of the later Modesty Blaise storylines

Romero began his association with writer Peter O'Donnell's Modesty Blaise strip in 1970 when he was called in to finish the storyline The War-Lords of Phoenix due to artist Jim Holdaway's unexpected death. Initially, Romero intentionally imitated Holdaway's style in order to make the changeover less noticeable, but soon established his own take on the character of Modesty Blaise, portraying her in a more exotic and voluptuous style than Holdaway did. Romero drew the Modesty Blaise strip until 1978, and while doing episodes of André Chéret's Rahan for the Franco-Belgian comics magazine Pif gadget from 1976, and beginning in 1978, Romero collaborated with Donne Avenell to create the science fiction series Axa for the English tabloid newspaper The Sun.

In 1986 Romero returned to Modesty Blaise and remained with the strip until O'Donnell retired in 2001. In 2002, Romero was commissioned to draw a graphic novel adaptation of the Modesty Blaise short story "The Dark Angels"; this work was initially published exclusively in Scandinavia but was later reprinted in a special issue of Comics Revue in the United States. Romero's entire run on the Modesty Blaise strip is continually reprinted in an ongoing series of compilation volumes published by the UK company Titan Books since 2005, while Comics Revue in the USA has reprinted all of his post-1986 work on the strip.

In the 2000s and on, Romero worked on Durham Red, and other projects for the magazines 2000 AD and Judge Dredd Megazine, as Enric Romero, and in 2011 he drew for the Italian market some short stories of Djustine, the horror-western character created by Enrico Teodorani.

== Bibliography ==
Comics work includes:

- Judge Anderson: "Golem" (as Enric Romero, with Alan Grant, in 2000 AD Annual 1987, 1986)
- The Scarlet Apocrypha: "Children of the Night" (as Enric Romero, with Dan Abnett, in Judge Dredd Megazine, vol. 4 #15, 2002)
