= My Name Is Modesty =

2004 American action film

- DVD cover
- Directed by: Scott Spiegel
- Screenplay by: Lee Batchler; Janet Scott-Batchler
- Based on: Characters by Peter O'Donnell; Jim Holdaway
- Produced by: Marcelo Anciano; Michael Berrow; Ted Nicolaou
- Starring: Alexandra Staden; Nikolaj Coster-Waldau; Raymond Cruz; Eugenia Yuan
- Cinematography: Vivi Dragan Vasile
- Edited by: Michelle Harrison
- Music by: Deborah Lurie
- Production company: Miramax Films
- Release dates: March 23, 2004 (Netherlands, DVD); September 28, 2004 (United States, DVD)
- Running time: 78 minutes
- Country: United States
- Language: English

My Name Is Modesty is a 2004 American action film directed by Scott Spiegel. Quentin Tarantino executive produced. It was released direct-to-DVD. The film is based on the early years of the character Modesty Blaise, a former crime boss turned secret agent. This is the third production that brings Peter O'Donnell's character Modesty Blaise to the screen, following the feature film Modesty Blaise with Monica Vitti in 1966 and the TV pilot Modesty Blaise with Ann Turkel in 1982.

The film stars British actress Alexandra Staden as Modesty and chronicles a crucial event in the character's life sometime before the start of the comic strip. As such, it omits the key character of Willie Garvin, Modesty's companion throughout the run of the original comic strip and the 30-year series of spin-off novels and short stories published by O'Donnell.

== Plot ==
Modesty Blaise is working as a croupier in a casino in Tangier. A group of violent criminals assassinate her employer and enter the casino shooting staff and demanding entry to the casino's safe. Modesty delays her retaliation and retribution as she protects the lives of her staff. When the criminals kill the only person who can open the safe, Modesty arranges for a fellow employee to arrive who has the password for the computer that holds the details of the entry to the vault. As the criminals and their captives await the individual, Modesty takes on the leader of the criminals at the game of roulette. They agree that if she wins twice in a row a captive sworn to not tell what happened is released; when she loses she has to tell the truth about her background to the leader of the criminals who has become fascinated by her. She relates her life story little by little in the manner of Scheherazade.

Modesty tells her life story in flashback beginning as an orphaned child in a refugee camp in the Balkans, to her meeting her mentor who teaches her his knowledge of various languages and martial arts until he died in Algeria where she makes her way to Tangier and becoming a croupier. The criminals eventually enter the safe but are confronted with a revenging Modesty.

The time setting of the film is kept vague. Although flashback sequences involving warfare invoke World War II or other conflicts in the late 1940s and early 1950s (in keeping with the original comic strip), Modesty as an adult is shown using computers and other current (for 2004) technology.

== Cast ==
- Alexandra Staden as Modesty Blaise
- Nikolaj Coster-Waldau as Miklos
- Raymond Cruz as Raphael Garcia
- Fred Pearson as Professor Lob
- Eugenia Yuan as Irina
- Valentin Teodosiu as Henri Louche
- Bianca Ana Tudorica as Young Modesty Blaise

== Production ==
After director Scott Spiegel filmed From Dusk till Dawn 2 in 1999, producer Harvey Weinstein asked Spiegel to direct My Name Is Modesty. Quentin Tarantino joined the filming as an executive producer. The filming took place in Bucharest, Romania and lasted 18 days. The film was produced pro forma for Miramax Films to maintain rights to the source material, the Modesty Blaise comic strip.

Peter O'Donnell acted as a consultant to the film with an updated sequence in the story mirroring how O'Donnell first met the girl who inspired him.

== Release ==
My Name Is Modesty was released straight to DVD.

== Reception ==
Juan Morales of The New York Times called the film one of the "vivid examples of Mr. Spiegel's sly, visual directing style". Joe Leydon of Variety opined that the film "isn't half-bad" and is a "mildly diverting time-killer". He went on to note, "Scripters Lee and Janet Scott Batchler concoct a scenario that often plays like the pilot for a syndicated tele series. Budgetary and scheduling restraints require vet vidpic director Scott Spiegel... to keep most of the action within the casino set. Still, Spiegel sustains a reasonable level of tension while Modesty stalls for time. Climactic smackdown is suitably brisk, if predictable. Handsome lensing by Vivi Dragan Vasile is a plus."
