= Stef Penney =

Scottish filmmaker and novelist

Stef Penney (born 1965 in Edinburgh) is a Scottish filmmaker and novelist.

She grew up in the Scottish capital and turned to film-making after a degree in Philosophy and Theology from Bristol University. She made three short films before studying Film and TV at Bournemouth College of Art, and on graduation was selected for the Carlton Television New Writers Scheme. She has also written and directed two short films; a BBC 10 x 10 starring Anna Friel and a Film Council Digital Short in 2002 starring Lucy Russell.

She won the 2006 Costa Book Awards and The Book-of-the-Month Club First Fiction Award with her debut novel The Tenderness of Wolves, which is set in Canada in the 1860s. The novel starts with the discovery of the murder of a trapper, and then follows various events that occur as the murderer is sought. As Stef Penney suffered from agoraphobia at the time of writing this novel, she did all the research in the libraries of London and never visited Canada.

She has subsequently written The Invisible Ones (2011) and Under A Pole Star (2016); the latter was shortlisted for the 2017 Costa Book Awards.

She has adapted three Modesty Blaise novels for BBC Radio.

== Bibliography ==
- The Tenderness of Wolves (2006)
- The Invisible Ones (2011)
- Under a Pole Star (2016)
- The Beasts of Paris (2023)
- The Long Water (2024)
