= Willie Garvin =

British comic strip character

Willie Garvin's exposition from In the Beginning (1966) Thai-boxing in Saigon

Willie Garvin is a character in the long-running British comic strip series Modesty Blaise, as well as a series of novels based upon the strip. The character was created by Peter O'Donnell in 1963 and, alongside Modesty Blaise, made his first appearance in the story La Machine, appearing for the first time in strip no. 21. Willie Garvin also appears in every volume of the Modesty Blaise book series.

== Character background ==
Willie Garvin appears throughout the Modesty Blaise series as Modesty's confidant and right-hand man. His background is never presented in an ordered, chronological context, but rather in bits and pieces over the course of the comic strip, which ran from 1963 to 2002, and the literary series, which shared a more-or-less common continuity and ran from 1965 to 1996.

What is known can be pieced together from the many tidbits revealed by O'Donnell over the years. Willie Garvin is British and has a rather shady background. He was born in Whitechapel to an unwed mother who died young, leaving him in the care of his "auntie"—an aged and alcoholic prostitute—who "taught him how to duck." He was then put in an orphanage which he ran away from after crossing a bully known as Dicer and losing his virginity to a girl nicknamed "Annie the Bang". He served in the French Foreign Legion, including the gruesome Battle of Dien Bien Phu, and later lived in Thailand, where he learned his skills as a Thai boxer.

It is during his time as a Thai boxer in Saigon (or Bangkok, O'Donnell changed the story at some point) that he first meets Modesty Blaise, who despite being only twenty, runs a powerful (but moralistic) criminal organisation called The Network. Modesty sees Willie in one of his fights, and sees him getting arrested afterwards ("for the brawl he'd been involved in the night before"). Modesty buys him out of jail and tells him that she believes he is capable of being more of a man than he currently is. She tests him by having him collect money owed by a person in Hong Kong. This simple order gets so complicated that Willie actually has to break the man out of a prison in mainland China just to complete the mission. Modesty is astonished and impressed by Willie's ingenuity and so invites him to join The Network. Willie accepts and spends six months training with Modesty to the point where they trust each other as much as they trust themselves. Willie becomes Modesty's most trusted man in The Network, and stays on for six years until Modesty shuts the organisation down. Afterwards, the two remain close friends—Willie opening a pub 25 mi (40 km) from London called The Treadmill—and when Sir Gerald Tarrant offers Modesty a chance to put her skills to work on behalf of British Intelligence, she easily recruits Willie to fight by her side.

== Character traits ==
Willie has a well-developed, if slightly dark, sense of humour, and often jokes about his and Modesty's lifestyles. He is given to quoting psalms, as he was once imprisoned for a year in Calcutta with only a psalter to read. Very sociable, he has a number of female acquaintances from all social levels (as Modesty humorously describes them, "from premier cru to honest vin de pays"), and is often reminded of anecdotes of them in the most unusual situations (such as when swimming in shark-infested waters or when hauling heavy objects up slopes).

The one exception to his romantic conquests is Modesty Blaise herself; feeling that he owes her a debt greater than anything physical can offer, he refuses to consider her in a romantic light and Modesty, in return, reciprocates by treating Willie as her one trusted friend. Willie rarely refers to Modesty Blaise by her name; his preferred nickname for her is "Princess". On occasion, he literally provides a shoulder for her to cry on (one of Modesty's character traits is that she occasionally weeps following the conclusion of a particularly nasty mission). The novel Dead Man's Handle (which begins with an extensive prologue detailing his first mission for Blaise and The Network) indicates that, despite acknowledging her attractiveness, Garvin from the start never thought of Blaise in a sexual way. Frequently in the novels and comic strip, Garvin and Blaise often need to explain to colleagues why they are not a romantic couple. In media adaptations, the 1966 film version of Modesty Blaise departs from this by having Blaise and Garvin not only enter into a romance, but become engaged in the movie's finale.

Willie Garvin is a tall and extremely strong man, though not heavily muscle-bound. He has a scar on his right hand made by a man named Suleiman, who was later killed by Modesty because he was torturing Willie. Like Modesty, he is a polymath of the first order: adept in safe-cracking and lock-picking, micro-electronics, expert at military tactics and a student of the criminal arts. He speaks several languages, including German, Spanish, Arabic and French; his English has a heavy cockney tone to it, though he is able to turn it on and off like a switch. Willie is a master knife thrower and can throw almost any object with extreme precision. He makes his own knives and is deadly with them at ranges up to 90 feet. He does not like pistols (because he thinks that guns give people too much confidence), and he and Modesty have also stated that he is a poor shot, but he has shown himself to be capable on the rare occasions that he uses such weapons. As an ex-soldier, he is skilled with rifles and submachine guns, and has on occasion also used a sniper rifle.

Willie, like Modesty, has a strong sense of right and wrong that is governed more by his morals than by the law. Although he avoids using deadly force whenever possible, usually taking his cue from Modesty as to whether to fight "for keeps" (the duo's euphemism for killing), he will not hesitate to kill to protect Modesty (see, for example, the conclusion to the 1975 comic strip "Cry Wolf").

Willie and Modesty both smoke Gauloises (Sabre-tooth).

== "I Had a Date with Lady Janet" ==
With one exception, all of the literary adventures of Modesty Blaise are told in the standard third person. The sole exception to this is the short story "I Had a Date with Lady Janet", which first appeared in the collection Pieces of Modesty. That story is told in first person from Willie Garvin's point of view. An audiobook of this story was narrated by John Thaw.

== Fate ==
Although Willie Garvin continued to appear in the Modesty Blaise comic strip until O'Donnell retired in 2002 (actually he retired in 2001, but a book-length strip based upon one of his short stories subsequently appeared in a Scandinavian publication the next year), chronologically his final appearance comes in the closing story of the 1996 short story collection Cobra Trap. (This last story is also called "Cobra Trap," like the book.)

The story takes place a number of years into the future, with Modesty in her early fifties and Willie approximately 60 years of age. During a caper to protect a trainload of innocent people, including some children, from a group of rebels, Modesty suddenly kisses Willie romantically (for the first and only time) and reveals to him that she is dying of a brain tumor. She orders Willie to leave with the train, allowing her to die alone in the battle against the rebels. Before he can react, Modesty is shot dead, and moments later, in a mortar attack, Willie's ankle is broken. Willie buries Modesty and then moves off slowly, hoping to escape through the jungle, but then Willie is also shot dead. As the story ends, O'Donnell describes Willie meeting Modesty in an ethereal environment, some kind of afterlife.

== Portrayals ==
O'Donnell has said that he had Michael Caine in mind when he created Willie Garvin and would have liked to see him portray him, but this never happened.

Willie Garvin has been portrayed on film and television. Terence Stamp portrayed Willie Garvin in the 1966 film version of Modesty Blaise, a year after the publication of the first novel. In this film, Willie is portrayed as slightly psychotic when he first appears on screen. Later, the writers of the film choose to break O'Donnell's anti-romance taboo and have Willie and Modesty fall in love and even talk about getting married. Willie Garvin next appeared on screen in the 1982 television pilot Modesty Blaise with Ann Turkel as the title character, which was not made into a television series. In this version, Willie is portrayed by Lewis Van Bergen.

In the early 1980s, John Thaw recorded an audio adaptation of I Had a Date with Lady Janet which he performed in character as Willie Garvin. One of the Modesty Blaise novels, Last Day in Limbo, was adapted as a BBC World Service radio drama in 1978 with James Bolam as Willie. Carl Prekopp played Willie in a 2012 BBC Radio 4 adaptation of A Taste for Death. In the 2014 BBC Radio 4 adaptation of Modesty Blaise, he was played by Neil Maskell.

The 2003 film My Name Is Modesty was produced as a prequel to the comic strip and novels; as such it is the only Modesty Blaise adventure in which Willie Garvin does not appear.

== Sources ==
- "Modesty Blaise comic strip checklist". sayyide.de.
