= Jim Holdaway =

British illustrator

- Born: 28 May 1927 London, England
- Died: 18 February 1970 (aged 42)
- Area: Artist
- Notable works: Romeo Brown; Modesty Blaise

Jim Holdaway (28 May 1927 – 18 February 1970) was a British illustrator, who contributed art for numerous comic strips. His best known work was on the Modesty Blaise comics written by Peter O'Donnell.

== Art career ==
Jim Holdaway was born in 1927 in Barnes Common, London. On completing schooling in New Malden, Surrey, Holdaway attended the Kingston School of Art. After spending two years of National Service from 1945 with the East Surrey Regiment, Holdaway went to Italy, Austria and Greece before returning to art school on an ex-Serviceman's grant.

Jim Holdaway eventually left to work in France where he did advertising work. Returning to England soon to take care of his widowed mother, Holdaway went to work for Scion Books in Kensington, doing a variety of artwork, book jackets, comic books and advertising. He then became freelance, working from home. He was drawing for Odhams and Farringdon Press doing 64-page comics including: Captain Vigour, The Football Comic, Steve Samson, Dick Hercules, Reveille, Tit-Bits, Comic Cuts, Junior Express (The Red Rider and Joanna of Bitter Creek, 1955), Mickey's Weekly (Davy Crockett, 1956), and Swift ("The Red Rider", 1956).

In 1957, Holdaway replaced the artist Alfred Mazure on the strip Romeo Brown, leading to the key association of his career with writer Peter O'Donnell. The two were a perfect match and in 1963 Holdaway started drawing for O'Donnell's Modesty Blaise comics strips.

A 1963 Modesty Blaise daily comic strip by Jim Holdaway. The title character and her partner Willie Garvin are shown.

Jim Holdaway died in 1970 from a heart attack midway through illustrating the Modesty Blaise story "The Warlords of Phoenix", leaving a wife, Audrey, and a daughter, Joanna. O'Donnell enlisted Enrique Badia Romero to complete the strip and Romero succeeded Holdaway as the strip's full-time artist. Years later, a painting of Modesty Blaise by Holdaway was used as the cover art for O'Donnell's final Modesty Blaise literary collection, Cobra Trap.

Holdaway's work on the Modesty Blaise strip has been reprinted on many occasions, most recently between 2003 and 2005 in reprint volumes published by Titan Books.
