= Ernest Hecht =

British publisher, producer and philanthropist (1929–2018)

Ernest Hecht OBE
- Born: 21 September 1929; Czechoslovakia
- Died: 13 February 2018 (aged 88); London, England
- Education: Hull University College
- Occupations: Publisher, producer and philanthropist
- Known for: Founder of Souvenir Press

Ernest Hecht OBE (21 September 1929 – 13 February 2018) was a British publisher, producer, and philanthropist. In 1951, he founded Souvenir Press Ltd, one of the very few remaining independently owned major publishing houses in Great Britain. In 2003, he set up the Ernest Hecht Charitable Foundation. Described by The Bookseller as "one of a number of émigrés who changed the face of British publishing after the Second World War alongside George Weidenfeld, Paul Hamlyn and André Deutsch", Hecht has been called "the last of the great publishers". He was appointed an OBE in the Queen's Birthday Honours List for services to Publishing and Charity in June 2015. In August 2015, he was honoured by the President of Brazil with the Order of Rio Branco, which was presented to Hecht at a ceremony by the Brazilian Ambassador in London.

== Early life ==
Born in 1929 in Czechoslovakia, the son of clothing manufacturers Richard and Annie Hecht, Ernest Hecht arrived in Britain as a Kindertransport (Jewish refugee) child in 1939; he recalls: "On the train to England as a young man, I remember throwing up on one of the Gestapo. My mother must have been terrified but the man said it was ok because he had children of his own." He was evacuated to Wiltshire, then to Minehead, Somerset. In the mid-1940s he attended Quintin School in Regent Street, London (later to become Quintin Kynaston School in Swiss Cottage), and went on to read Economics and Commerce at Hull University College.

== Publishing ==
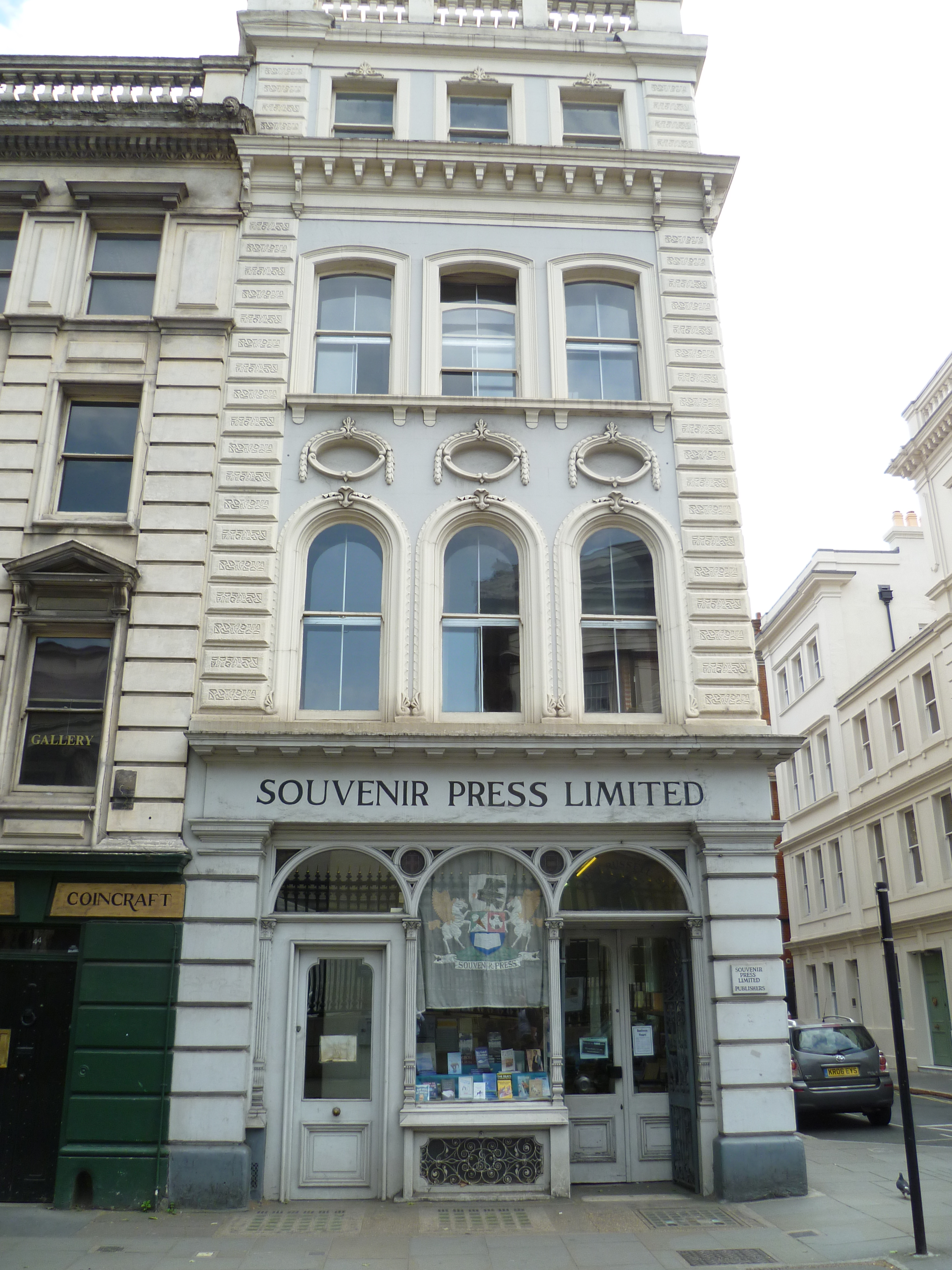
Souvenir Press, Great Russell Street, Bloomsbury, London.

Hecht started Souvenir Press in 1951 in his bedroom at his parents' flat with a loan of £250, "a bed, a desk, a typewriter and a phone in the hall", his first book being "a paperback on cricket entitled Len Hutton: The World's Greatest Batsman, written by a college friend and retailing at two shillings (ten pence)." Hecht successfully built the business up and ran the company for more than six decades.

Producing an eccentric list of titles ("His authors have ranged from Argentine revolutionary Che Guevara to comic chronicler of the British upper classes, PG Wodehouse, from Norwegian Kon Tiki adventurer Thor Heyerdahl to tap dance legend Fred Astaire...") from a notoriously untidy office in Bloomsbury, Hecht was quoted as saying: "Anyone can create a high-class literary list of prestige titles. It's better to have a balanced list, comprising books that make money and those perhaps more worthy titles that don't. My adage is that a publisher’s first duty to an author is to remain solvent." Nevertheless, characterised as a risk-taker, he also expressed the view that, as a publisher: "You have the freedom, and I'd be inclined to say, the duty, to publish books of a minority interest and titles whose time may not yet have arrived or ideas that challenge received wisdom." As he said in a 2016 interview with Matthew Engel: "The rule of independent publishing is that there are no rules."

Souvenir Press had more than 500 titles in print by the time of Hecht's death in 2018 and had number-one bestsellers on both sides of the Atlantic. Book series published by Souvenir included Condor Books, Human Horizons and Independent Voices. Hecht celebrated the company's 65th anniversary in April 2016. He published five Nobel laureates, including Norwegian novelist Knut Hamsun and the Chilean poet Pablo Neruda.

Hecht received the British Book Awards Lifetime Achievement Award in 2001, and he was a chairman of the Society of Bookmen.

== Music and theatre ==
Ernest Hecht and Souvenir Press also produced concerts and presented many theatrical productions, including Uproar in the House, with Brian Rix, Joan Sims, and Nicholas Parsons; Sign Here Please by Valentin Kataev, adapted by Marty Feldman, with Terry Scott, Peter Jones and Ambrosine Phillpotts; and more recently The World's Wife by Carol Ann Duffy, with Sinéad Cusack, Harriet Walter, Jan Watson, Lynn Farleigh and Barb Jungr.

== The Ernest Hecht Charitable Foundation ==
Set up in 2003, the Ernest Hecht Charitable Foundation aimed to provide financial and practical assistance that could make a difference to people's lives, supporting the work of other UK charitable organisations "particularly those that benefit the disadvantaged, by providing financial assistance with the aim of making a difference by improving the quality of people's lives".

Charities and organisations the Foundation has supported include: Lucy Cavendish College, Cambridge; Cardboard Citizens; University College London; Chickenshed Theatre; The National Gallery's Dame Myra Hess Day; Whizz-Kidz; Royal College of Music; React – Rapid Effective Assistance for Children with Potentially Terminal illness; Alzheimer's Society "Singing for the Brain" groups; Action for Blind People; InterAct Reading Service; Mildmay Mission Hospital; Dementia Care; Resource: The Jewish Employment Advice Centre; Scottish Disability Golf Partnership; British Limbless Ex-Service Men's Association; Tricycle Theatre; Macmillan Centre Clinical Nurse Specialists; Salvation Army; RAF Benevolent Fund; St John's Hospice; Marie Curie Cancer Care Nurses; St John's Ambulance.

== Awards ==
Hecht's awards included the Specsavers National Book Awards 2001 Lifetime Achievement Award, the Neruda Medal presented by the Chilean government, and an honorary fellowship of University College London, in 2006.

He was appointed an Officer of the Order of the British Empire (OBE) in the Queen's Birthday Honours List for services to Publishing and Charity in June 2015. In August 2015, he was honoured with Brazil's Order of Rio Branco, in recognition of his contribution to promoting Brazilian culture in the English-speaking world, through publishing some of Brazil's most notable writers, such as Jorge Amado, Fernando Sabino and Carolina Maria de Jesus.

In April 2016, Hecht was awarded the London Book Fair Simon Master Chairman's Award.

== Personal life ==
Hecht lived and worked in London, where he was a long-standing supporter of Arsenal Football Club: he took his Arsenal hat with him to Buckingham Palace when accepting his OBE from Prince Charles. Hecht was the literary agent of Brazilian footballer Pelé and found the time to attend nine of the past 11 World Cup finals by 2002. In 2016, Hecht dismissed suggestions of an autobiography with the words: "Publishers' books never sell."

He died in hospital in London after a short illness, on 13 February 2018. Unmarried and without children or heir, Hecht was reported as having said: "I’m not unduly worried what happens to Souvenir when I’m not here for the simple reason that I won’t be here."
