= Run Baby Run (2012 film) =

- Theatrical release poster
- Directed by: Joshiy
- Written by: Sachy
- Produced by: Milan Jaleel
- Starring: Mohanlal; Amala Paul; Biju Menon; Shammi Thilakan
- Cinematography: R. D. Rajasekhar
- Edited by: Shyam Sasidharan
- Music by: Ratheesh Vegha
- Production company: Galaxy Films
- Distributed by: Galaxy Films; PJ Entertainments; Achu & Achu'S Creations
- Release date: 29 August 2012
- Running time: 140 minutes
- Country: India
- Language: Malayalam
- Box office: est. ₹29 crore

Run Baby Run (stylized as Run Babby Run) is a 2012 Indian Malayalam-language action thriller film directed by Joshiy, and produced by Milan Jaleel through Galaxy Films. It was the first independent screenplay of Sachy following the split of Sachi-Sethu duo. The film stars Mohanlal, Amala Paul and Biju Menon in lead roles. It also stars Sai Kumar, Siddique, Vijayaraghavan and Shammi Thilakan. The music was composed by Ratheesh Vegha, while cinematography was done by R. D. Rajasekhar.

The film, which is set in the backdrop of news media, has Mohanlal playing the role of a channel cameraman Venu and Amala Paul that of a senior editor Renuka. The story traces their relationship and professional conflicts. Run Baby Run released worldwide on 29 August 2012. The film was a commercial success and one of the highest-grossing Malayalam films of the year.

== Plot ==
Venu is a high-profile news cameraman working with Reuters, who graduates from a premier film institute, but prefers to shoot news rather than the manipulated visuals for films. Venu is mostly based in Delhi, but has come to Kochi to appear for a case in which he is involved, and is assigned to cover a case involving a local politician where he gets to meet Renuka. Renuka is the executive editor of Bharath Vision and Venu and Renuka have a story to tell of their own. A flashback tells the story about how two lovers turned into foes.

Rishikesh is the head of another channel, News Bureau of India (NBI), who is going through some difficult times, as some of his star performers have gone in search of greener pastures. Venu and Renuka come together to investigate a particular story about a murder planned by a major politician named Bharathan Pillai, who has lost his fame when Venu and Renuka had exposed a scam involving him. How Renuka and Venu again exposes Bharathan Pillai and reunite with each other forms the crux of the plot.

== Cast ==
- Mohanlal as Venugopal, a stringer working for Reuters
- Amala Paul as Renuka, Executive Editor & Reporter of Bharath Vision, and Venu's ex-girlfriend
- Biju Menon as Rishikesh, Founder of News Bureau of India (NBI), and Venu's friend
- Shammi Thilakan as DYSP Benny Tharakan
- Vijayaraghavan as SP Somarajan IPS, Venu's friend
- Sai Kumar as Chief Minister Bharathan Pillai
- Siddique as Rajan Kartha, a NRI business tycoon and Pillai's friend
- Ameer Niyaz as Abu, Rishi's assistant
- Aparna Nair as Indu Panicker, Reporter of NBI, and Rishi's girlfriend
- Krishna Kumar as Vijayakumar, Chief Operating Officer of Bharath Vision
- Mithun Ramesh as Adv. Manilal, Renu's cousin
- V.K Baiju as CI Tony
- Anil Murali as Sugunan, Pillai's party worker
- Anoop Chandran as Vargeese, Pillai's assistant
- Sivaji Guruvayoor as Minister Kunjumoidheen
- Jins Varghese as Sanju, sub-editor of Bharath Vision
- Biju Pappan as Sukumaran Thampi
- Babu Jose
- Niyas Backer
- Nandhu Podhuval as Ravindran
- Ponnamma Babu
- Ammu Venugopal as Reporter
- Vandana Krishnan as Reporter
- Arun Babu as man in MLA office
- Joju George as Shibu, Pilla's henchman
- Mehul James as a reporter

== Production ==
The film is produced by Milan Jaleel under the banner of Galaxy Films. Cinematography was done by R. D. Rajasekhar and music direction by Ratheesh Vegha.Art Direction was done by Sabu Pravadas, Publicity designs by Collins Leophil, Associate Director Shaji Padoor and Stills were done by Aaghosh.

Run Baby Run was written by Sachy.

== Release ==
Mohanlal held a sneak preview of the film on 28 August, at a theatre owned by director Priyadarshan in Chennai. The preview was attended by Amala Paul, Priyadarsan, Suresh Balaji, Lizzy Priyadarsan, Ouseppachan, and R. D. Rajasekhar.

== Reception ==
=== Critical response ===
Paresh C Palicha of Rediff.com wrote, "The acting department depends on Mohanlal a bit too much", but described Mohanlal's performance as "impeccable". IbnLive.in called it as a "gripping thriller" lauding Mohanlal's performance, script, direction and technicians said "the film is a roller coaster ride. The movie has the precise doses of actions, thrills, lighter moments and finer sequences which are also laced with a fine performance of the cast" and concluded "For the lovers of relatively well made thrillers, 'Run baby Run' is definitely your movie and you may love to see it, more than once. Forget the little glitches and watch the wonderful performance of Mohanlal.".

Oneindia.in praised Mohanlal's performance as "outstanding" and complimented RD Rajasekhar's cinematography. Sify.com rated it as "Very Good" and said that "Run Babby Run is a thriller that keeps you glued on to the screens. It is a gripping tale with some good visuals and excellent performances. On the whole it is an engaging thriller which has the right doses of histrionics, tautness, anguish and thrills."

G. Krishnamurthy of Indulekha.com said "Run baby Run is the only Malayalam film released which can be recommended to watch among the Onam releases.". Giving special mention to Mohanlal, Sachy, Joshiy, R.D Rajasekhar and other creative department. Unni R Nair of Kerala9.com rated 3/5 and stated "Joshiy is in full control. As usual, he has done full justice to the subject at hand and has delivered perfectly well." and with a praise for performance and technical aspects.

Raj Vikram of Metro Matinee gave a verdict "Run baby Run entertains" and concluded "In spite of all the faults, "Run Babby Run" manages to run and reach home mainly because of the overwhelming presence of Mohanlal who comes out with another mesmerizing performance. At times, the flick turns to a fine entertainer for this festival season even by leaving few down points.". Ashwin j Kumar of The Times of India rated 3/5 and said "The film depicts the true face of media war. The film is driven by a flimsy narrative and lavished with twists."

=== Box office ===
The film was screened in 105 screens in Kerala and outside the state. It collected ₹7.5 crore (US$780,000) in 10 days and stood in number one position among the Ramadan and Onam releases at the Kerala box office even in the third weekend. In 3 weeks it completed 7000 shows and in four weeks it earned a distributors share as calculated after tax and theatre charges, approximately ₹4.25 crore (US$440,000). And continued in 15 releasing centres in sixth week. The film completed 100 days theatrical run at the box office and grossed more than ₹15 crore (US$1.6 million) from Kerala box office. IBN Live called it a "blockbuster".

== Re‑release ==
The film, which had been a commercial success during its initial release, was re‑released in 2026 in a remastered 4K Dolby Atmos format. Despite the original popularity and widespread anticipation, the re‑release failed to draw significant audiences, resulting in poor box office performance. Sparse theatre attendance and low ticket sales highlighted that the film’s nostalgic appeal did not translate into commercial success a second time, sparking discussions about the challenges of reviving older titles in cinemas and the limited market for re‑issued films.

== Accolades ==
Ceremony	Category	Nominee	Result
Asiavision Awards	Best Actor	Mohanlal	Won
Asiavision Awards	New Sensation in Singing	Mohanlal for "Aattumanal Payayil.."	Won
2nd South Indian International Movie Awards	Best Actress	Amala Paul	Won
2nd South Indian International Movie Awards	Best Male Playback Singer	Mohanlal for "Aatumanal Payayil"	Nominated
2nd South Indian International Movie Awards	Best Dance Choreographer	Brinda for "Aatumanal Payayil"	Won
Asianet Film Awards	Best Actor	Mohanlal	Won
Asianet Film Awards	Best Character Actor	Biju Menon	Won

== Soundtrack ==
Run Baby Run

Soundtrack album by Ratheesh Vegha
- Released: 25 August 2012
- Recorded: 2012
- Genre: Film soundtrack
- Length: 25:32
- Language: Malayalam
- Label: Manorama Music
- Producer: Milan Jaleel

Ratheesh Vegha chronology
Namukku Parkkan (2012)	Run Baby Run (2012)	Poppins (2012)

The soundtrack was composed by Ratheesh Vegha, with lyrics penned by Rafeeq Ahmed. Mohanlal sings a folk number titled "Attumanal Payayil" in this film. The album consists of six songs. The audio rights were acquired by Manorama Music for a price of ₹16 million (US$170,000). The album was launched on 25 August 2012 at Dream Hotel in Kochi. The event was attended by Mohanlal, Mammootty, Joshiy, Mukesh, Milan Jaleel, Ratheesh Vegha, Amala Paul and several personalities from the film industry along with the technical crew and cast of Run Baby Run.

Track list
No.	Title	Lyrics	Singer(s)	Length
1.	"Attumanal Payayil"	Rafeeq Ahmed	Mohanlal	3:49
2.	"Aarohanam Avarohanam"	Rafeeq Ahmed	Vijay Yesudas	4:25
3.	"Run Baby Run"	Rafeeq Ahmed	Ratheesh Vegha	4:20
4.	"Aarohanam Avarohanam"	Rafeeq Ahmed	Thulasi Yatheendran	4:20
5.	"Attumanal (Karaoke)"	Rafeeq Ahmed		4:11
6.	"Aarohanam Avarohanam" (karaoke)	Rafeeq Ahmed		4:21
Total length:				25:32
