= Aparna Nair =

Indian actress (born 1989)

- Aparna Nair
- Occupation: Actress
- Years active: 2007 – 2023

Aparna Nair is an Indian actress who appears in Malayalam cinema.

== Biography ==
Aparna was introduced to cinema by the veteran writer-director Lohithadas in Nivedyam. After Nivedyam, she portrayed Panchali in the play Chayamukhi, which had Mohanlal and Mukesh in lead roles. Aparna portrayed Kaviyoor Ponnamma’s young version in the 2009 film Meghatheertham, opposite Manikuttan.

In 2010, she acted in Arun Kumar Aravind's Cocktail alongside Anoop Menon, Jayasurya and Samvrutha Sunil, which became a box office success. The film is regarded as one of the earliest defining films of the New wave movement in Malayalam cinema. In Kayam, Aparna was Bala’s pair.

Her debut Tamil film was Edhuvum Nadakkum. She then acted in Beautiful, receiving accolades for her performance. Next she acted in Streetlight directed by Sankar, in which she played four roles. She also acted in movies such as Mallu Singh, Thattathin Marayathu, and Joshiy’s Run Babby Run.

== Filmography ==
Year	Title	Role	Language	Notes
2005	Mayookham	Nalini's friend	Malayalam	Debut film Cameo appearance
2006	Notebook	TV Journalist	Malayalam	Cameo appearance
2007	Nivedyam	Hemalatha	Malayalam	
2009	Meghatheertham	Young Gayathri Devi	Malayalam	
2009	Edhuvum Nadakkum	Pooja	Tamil	
2010	Cocktail	Devi	Malayalam	
2010	Ammanilavu	Unknown	Malayalam	
2011	Kayam	Muthulakshmi	Malayalam	
2011	Beautiful	Meera	Malayalam	
2012	Mallu Singh	Swetha	Malayalam	
2012	Thattathin Marayathu	Mehru	Malayalam	
2012	Run Babby Run	Indu Panicker	Malayalam	
2012	Oru Kutty Chodyam	Akku's mom	Malayalam	Short film
2013	Mumbai Police	Rakhi Menon	Malayalam	
2013	Hotel California	Anu	Malayalam	
2013	Silence	Liji John Kaatungal	Malayalam	
2013	Chinni Chinni Aasa	Anu Nair	Telugu	
2014	Masala Republic	Sherya	Malayalam	
2014	@Andheri	Meera	Malayalam	
2014	Burn My Body	Nurse	Malayalam	Short film
2014	Seconds	Teena	Malayalam	
2015	Streetlight	Hima	Malayalam	
2015	St Mary'sile Kolapathakam	Pooja	Malayalam	
2015	Madhura Naranga	Deepa, Gynaecologist	Malayalam	
2015	Celebrate Happiness	Herself	English	Video Song
2016	Abhimukham	Abhirami	Malayalam	Short film
2017	Vannyam	Sr.Aneetta	Malayalam	
2019	Kalki	Avani	Malayalam	
2021	Thamara	Thamara	Malayalam	Direct OTT Release
2022	Kallan D'Souza	Lakshmi Warrier	Malayalam	
2022	Oruthee	Sathi	Malayalam	
2022	The Realisation	Yamuna	Malayalam	Short film
