= D Company (2013 film) =

2013 Indian Malayalam film

- Theatrical release poster
- Directed by: M. Padmakumar; Diphan; Vinod Vijayan
- Written by: G.S Anil; Anoop Menon; Rajesh Ravi
- Produced by: K. Mohanan; Vinod Vijayan
- Starring: Fahadh Faasil; Unni Mukundan; Asif Ali
- Cinematography: Bharani K. Dharan; Vinod Illampally; Pappu
- Edited by: B. Ajithkumar; Samjith Mohammed; Mohammed Arun
- Music by: Rahul Raj; Gopi Sundar; Ratheesh Vegha
- Production companies: Seven Arts International; D Cutz Film Company
- Distributed by: Seven Arts International Release
- Release date: 14 September 2013 (India)
- Running time: 122 minutes
- Country: India
- Language: Malayalam

D Company is a 2013 Indian Malayalam anthology action film directed by M. Padmakumar, Diphan and Vinod Vijayan. The film consists of three segments: Oru Bolivian Diary 1995, Gangs of Vadakkumnathan and Day of Judgement. It stars Fahadh Faasil, Unni Mukundan, Asif Ali, Jayasurya and Anoop Menon in lead characters. The film was produced by Vinod Vijayan, Seven Arts Mohan and Faisal Latheef under the banner of D Cutz Film Company and distributed by Seven Arts International.

The film was earlier supposed to have five featurettes by directors Diphan, M. Padmakumar, Vinod Vijayan, Shaji Kailas and Joshiy, but was split into two films, with the first part having segments by the former three directors. The second part did not materialise. D Company was released during the Onam festival season in 2013. The film received mixed reviews from critics.

== Episodes ==
| Segment Title | Director | Writer | Cinematography | Music |
|---|---|---|---|---|
| Oru Bolivian Diary 1995 | M. Padmakumar | G.S Anil | Bharani K. Dharan | Rahul Raj |
| Gangs of Vadakkumnathan | Diphan | Anoop Menon | Vinod Illampally | Gopi Sundar |
| A Day of Judgement | Vinod Vijayan | Rajesh Ravi | Pappu | Ratheesh Vega |

== Plots ==
=== Oru Bolivian Diary 1995 ===
Oru Bolivian Diary 1995, set in a tribal habitat deep in the jungle, is about a North Indian Maoist leader Chaukidar (Samuthirakani) who comes to Wayanad to spread his doctrines among the local tribes. They assassinate policemen, and a tribal youth Chinnan (Asif Ali) tries to protect Chaukidar from police. Though Chinnan is apprehended, interrogated and eliminated, Chaukidar remains at bay, continuing to spread his influence. Chaukidar is shown to be inspired by The Bolivian Diary, written by Che Guevara. These events are narrated by police inspector Narain, to reporter Indumathi (Ananya), 15 years after the incident. It is finally revealed that Indumathi is also a supporter of Maoism, inspired by the same book which influenced Chaukidar.

=== Gangs of Vadakkumnathan ===
Gangs of Vadakkumnathan is a gangster film about black money, money laundering and gang wars in Thrissur city. Liquor baron Ajay Mallya, a character based on Vijay Mallya, is murdered in Bangalore, after which ₹7.50 billion goes missing.Corrupted police officer Akbar (Anoop Menon) arrives at Thrissur, at the behest of the Mallya's son Sudheer Mallya (character based on Sidhartha Vijay Mallya) for investigating the murder case, with a promise of a share in the recovered money. Akbar's team suspect the deadly Gangs of Vadakkumnathan and a jeweller to be involved. Akbar finds the money and eliminates the gangs and the jeweller tactfully, Sarath (Unni Mukundan) says that Varaal Jaison (Jayasurya), Kuppi Simon (Deepak Parambol) and Raphael Paulo Alukkar (Salilraj Kuruvath) are the three main gangsters in Thrissur city. Raphael Alukkar was a jeweler, and Akbar conducts a cross syndicate bust on them. For this, a gang war is started. Akbar's plan is to have the three gangsters fight and kill each other. Jaison kills Raphael, then Kuppi Simon kills Jaison. On Akbar's instructions, Sarath kills Simon without anyone knowing. Akbar took a lady named Farida into custody. Farida told that she bought gold worth Rs 30,000 with a torn Rs 10 note given to her by Mustafa at a gold shop. Akbar says that the money laundering was done through an agency called Solaris, owned by Mallya and Raphael, which switched employees' salary money with ministers' black money without their knowledge in order to launder it, returning only part of the money while keeping the rest. Finally, it is secretly revealed that Akbar was the one who murdered Mallya and planned the entire setup, which is known only by Akbar and his accomplice.

=== The Day of Judgement ===
The Day of Judgement is about the agony suffered by a doctor – Sunil Mathew (Fahadh Faasil) after his wife's death.

Dr.Sunil's mentally unstable wife Jeena (Bhama) has fallen from the balcony to her death. Police suspect Sunil, but they inform him that "another" dead body has been found from his villa, and they bring him in early morning for questioning about that "dead body". But no questioning happens all day at the station, and instead police keep telling him that the body was that of one of his nurses, Maya, and all evidence of the murder points to him, including his friend Vishnu's testimony. Sunil escapes from the police station and decides to confront Vishnu to prove his innocence. On the way, he realizes that no murder really occurred; police have laid a trap for him along with Vishnu to make him confess to Jeena's murder (which Sunil has in fact committed by actually pushing her down from the balcony as he could not tolerate her mental illness), and they are probably waiting for him at Vishnu's house to try to record him admitting his guilt as evidence and trap him. Sunil instead goes to the bus stand and escapes.

== Cast ==
Oru Bolivian Diary 1995

- Asif Ali as Chinnan
- Samuthirakani as Chaukidaar
- Ananya as Indumathi
- Aadukalam Naren as Nripan Chakraborthy
- Gayathri as Indumathi's mother

Gangs of Vadakkumnathan

- Anoop Menon as Akbar
- Jayasurya as Varaal Jaison
- Unni Mukundan as Sharath
- Joju George as Abhilash Pillai
- Rajeev Pillai as Sudheer Mallya (character based on Siddharth Mallya)
- Irshad as Narendran
- Parvathy as Lora
- Deepak Parambol as Kuppi Simon
- Arun Cherukavil as Media Person Venu
- Jins Baskar as College Student
- Salilraj Kuruvath as Raphael Paulo Alukkar (character based on Boby Chemmanur)
- Kiran Raj as Hanumantha
- Lishoy as an Intelligence officer
- Dinesh Prabhakar as Akbar's companion

The Day of Judgement

- Fahadh Faasil as Dr. Sunil Mathew
- Bhama as Jeena
- Tanushree Ghosh as Sarena Mohammed
- Jinu Joseph as Vishnu
- Pooja as Teena

=== Special appearances ===
- Shanvi Srivastava as herself

== Production ==
=== Pre-production ===
D Company is touted as Indian cinema's first action anthology. Scenarists Ranjith and A. K. Sajan were also approached for writing two of the films but they rejected. Anoop Menon, who scripted Gangs of Vadakkumnathan, was also initially reluctant to do the project. In an interview, he said, "I have been approached to write a part of D Company. But, right now, my hands are full and I haven't got time to sit and think about it." Parvathy Nair was chosen to play the wife of the character played by Jayasurya. She had earlier been in news for rejecting an important role in the Jayasurya-starrer film Beautiful.

Shaji Kailas's featurette Godse is based on the assassination of Mahatma Gandhi. The director says, "The movie is about the conflict of emotions and explores the turmoil that Godse goes through the night before he kills Mahatma Gandhi. It's basically the fight between the good and the evil. There is an intense struggle that Godse goes through before committing the crime. Finally, he does it, justifying it as God's wish." The film has only a few characters and will be made as a soliloquy of Nathuram Godse, as he weighs the pros and cons of his deed. The film is inspired by the controversial book Freedom at Midnight by Larry Collins and Dominique Lapierre. According to the director, the film evolved from the final pages of the book, which describes what Godse went through before assassinating Gandhi. Godse will start filming as soon as Kailas finishes his project Madirasi.

Veteran director Joshiy, who directed the film starring Mohanlal, first approached Kerala-borne Tamil actress Trisha to play the female lead. However, she opted out citing her busy schedules. However, some reports say that she demanded ₹ 40 lakhs, a large sum for a Malayalam film, and the director himself replaced her.

Initially, each segments were planned to be named after colours such as Red, Blue, Green etc. but however this idea was later dropped.

The stunt sequences are done by Mafia Sasi, Thyagarajan, Anal Arasu and Kanal Kannan.

=== Filming ===
Oru Bolivian Diary 1995, the first short in the series, started its filming in May 2012 in Hyderabad. Its second schedule of filming started on 7 June and the film was shot extensively in Muthanga near Sultan Battery. Major parts were shot in about 10 days. Several locals from Wayanad district and about 20 police officers from the state police force were also part of the film. About the film, M. Padmakumar says, "It's an action film in the sense that an element of suspense is retained throughout and the film is essentially a thriller. It doesn't mean that the film is full of firearm fights and stunt sequences."

Gangs of Vadakkumnathan, directed by Diphan and written by Anoop Menon, was one of the anthology's segments.

The third segment was titled Diya. Fahadh Faasil plays a doctor in the film. The shoot for Diya will start on 20 May. In June 2013, Bhama stated that she starred in the segment directed by Vinod Vijayan, where she is paired with Fahadh Faasil. Tanushree Ghosh said that she will portray the role of a trainee Assistant Commissioner of Police in Vinod Vijayan's featurette. Praveen B Menon was the production controller of this film.

== Reception ==
Paresh C. Palicha of Rediff.com wrote that D Company was "just average", while noting that Day of Judgement was the most interesting of the three segments.

A critic from The Times of India gave the film 2.5 out of 5 stars and wrote that the anthology had traces of strong cinematic moments despite its shortcomings.
