= Rajeevnath =

Indian film director

T. Rajeevnath
- Born: 1951 (age 74–75); Changanassery, Kerala, India
- Education: Sainik School Kazhakootam
- Occupation: Film director
- Years active: 1976—present
- Spouse: Sreekumary
- Children: Shankarnath; Vishwanath
- Awards: National Film Award for Best Direction; 1998 – Janani Kerala State Film Award for Best Director; 1976 – Thanal

Rajeevnath is an Indian National Award-winning Malayalam film director.

== Career ==
Rajeevnath ventured into filmmaking with a short film shot in 16mm camera after finishing his university course. He debuted as a director of feature films with Thanal (1976). The film won him the Kerala State Film Award for Best Director. The film also won M. G. Soman his only Kerala State Film Award for Best Actor. His 1988 film Kadaltheerathu, based on the short story by O. V. Vijayan was selected for Indian Panorama at the International Film Festival of India. The film, made with a minuscule budget of Rs. 600,000 ($12000 as per 2012 conversion rate) was the Indian entry for Alexandria Film Festival. The film received mixed reviews, though according to Rajeevnath, Vijayan himself was very impressed with the film. His 1992 film Aham was made with Rs. 4.6 million, despite starring Mohanlal, one of the leading actors in the industry. His much awaited Sivaji Ganesan – Mohanlal starrer Swarnachamaram was dropped after the almost completion of the film due to script changes.

In 1999, his film Janani, exploring maternity, was premiered in Oslo, Norway and won him the National Film Award for Best Direction. In 2006, he planned a biopic of Mother Teresa and reportedly considered socialite Paris Hilton for the lead role. He also suggested that his industry friends such as Mohanlal and Kamal Haasan would accept roles in the project. The news created a furore prompting him to clarify that Hilton won't be playing Mother Teresa. However, the film was never made. In 2007, he announced his plan to make a film titled Ezham Mudra (The Seventh Seal), starring Suresh Gopi and Mandira Bedi as a tribute to the romantic classic Casablanca (1942) in the backdrop of the Sri Lankan Civil War. This news too was extensively covered by foreign press, many reports wrongly referring to him as a "Bollywood director". This film also never materialised. In 2008, he teamed with Mohanlal again for Pakal Nakshatrangal (Stars of the Day Light). His latest was the Hindi film Anubhav: An Actor's Tale (2009), written by Anoop Menon who had also written Pakal Nakshatrangal.

== Filmography ==
- Note: all films are in Malayalam, unless otherwise noted.

Year	Film	Notes
1976	Thanal	Kerala State Film Award for Best Director
1978	Theerangal	
1980	Sooryante Maranum	
1986	Kaveri	
1988	Kadaltheerathu	
1992	Aham	
1996	Swarnachamaram	Unreleased
1998	Janani	National Film Award for Best Director
2004	Moksham	
2008	Pakal Nakshatrangal	
2009	Anubhav	Hindi film
2013	David and Goliath	
2015	Rasam	
2017	Poottu	
2019	Aniyan Kunjum Thannalayathu	
2022	Headmaster	Completed
