= Thanal =

Thanal may refer to:

- Thanal (1978 film), an Indian Malayalam film
- Thanal (2025 film), an Indian Tamil-language action drama film
