= Lokpal (film) =

- Theatrical release poster
- Directed by: Joshiy
- Written by: S. N. Swamy
- Produced by: Ruby Vijayan; S. L. Vimal Kumar
- Starring: Mohanlal; Kavya Madhavan; Meera Nandan; Manoj K. Jayan; Thambi Ramaiah; Sai Kumar
- Cinematography: Pradeep Nair
- Edited by: Shyam Sasidharan
- Music by: Ratheesh Vegha
- Production companies: Happy & Ruby Cinemas
- Distributed by: Maxlab Cinemas and Entertainments
- Release date: 31 January 2013
- Running time: 140 minutes
- Country: India
- Language: Malayalam

Lokpal is a 2013 Indian Malayalam-language vigilante thriller film written by S. N. Swamy and directed by Joshiy. The film stars Mohanlal as chef Nandagopal who leads a double life with an alter ego named Lokpal, a vigilante fighting against corruption. Kavya Madhavan, Meera Nandan, Manoj K. Jayan, Thambi Ramaiah and Sai Kumar play supporting roles. The soundtrack was composed by Ratheesh Vegha. The film was released on 31 January 2013.

== Plot ==
Nandagopal, while publicly known as the chef of the popular Nandu's Food Court, is also 'Lokpal' (Peoples' Protector), who fights corruption. The film does a flashback to Nandagopal's backstory which involves "attempted murder, a juvenile home and unrequited love"

== Cast ==
- Mohanlal as Nandagopal (Lokpal)
- Manoj K. Jayan as SP Vijayan IPS
- Sai Kumar as Manuel Ittyer
- Thambi Ramaiah as SI Ramdasa
- Kavya Madhavan as Dr. Geetha, Vijayan's wife
- Meera Nandan as Jane
- T. G. Ravi as Sathyanweshi Mukundan Menon
- Krishna Kumar as SI Kishore, Lokpal's ally
- Balachandran Chullikkadu as Ashraf, a registrar and Lokpal's ally
- Thalaivasal Vijay as Advocate P.K.Ramabhadran
- Maniyanpilla Raju as Minister Anirudhan
- Shammi Thilakan as Vidhyadharan
- Sivaji Guruvayoor as Muraleedharan
- Murali Mohan as Judge
- Baiju V.K. as Adv. Somasundaram
- Mahesh as Tomichan
- Pradeep Chandran as CI Sunil
- Baiju Jose as Sajan, Security Police
- Kalasala Babu as Moideen Sahib
- Shafna as Neethu
- Asha Aravind as Dr. Elizabeth
- Reena Basheer as Nandagopal's mother

== Production ==
The film is produced by S. L. Vimal Kumar, Balan Vijayan, and M. Vijayakumar, under the banner of Happy & Ruby Cinemas. The film was launched on 10 September 2012 with a pooja ceremony organised at the Holiday Inn Hotel in Kochi, India. The movie was filmed in Kochi.

== Release ==
The film was released on 31 January 2013 in 80 screens across Kerala. The distribution rights for Lokpal were bought by Maxlab Cinemas and Entertainments. Lokpal's premiere was held on 22 January 2013 in Kalabhavan theatre, Trivandrum, Kerala.

=== Critical reception ===
The film received negative reviews from critics. Paresh C Palicha of Rediff gave the movie 1.8/5, commenting that "It is hard to believe that Lokpal is the work of the director Joshiy who has given some good films in the past, which is a huge letdown." Moviebuzz of Sify gave the movie a verdict of "Pathetic", stating that "Lokpal is the kind of film that has been made with some kind of arrogance, without even scant regard for the viewer. Watch some of the yesteryear gems from Mohanlal instead of wasting time on this one." Unni R Nair of Kerala9 gave the movie 2/5, saying that "Lokpal is unimpressive, just because the script plays foil. Is watchable for the sake of Mohanlal." Parvathy Nair of SansCinema gave the movie 1/4, commenting that "Lokpal is a missed opportunity, with the only highlight being the presence and performance of Mohanlal."

== Soundtrack ==
Lokpal

Soundtrack album by Ratheesh Vegha
- Released: 26 January 2013
- Recorded: 2012
- Genre: Film soundtrack
- Length: 25:32
- Language: Malayalam
- Label: Manorama Music
- Producer: Ratheesh Vegha

Ratheesh Vegha chronology
Matinee (2012)	Lokpal (2013)	David and Goliath (2013)

The soundtrack was composed by Ratheesh Vegha, with lyrics by Rafeeq Ahmed. The album consists of six songs and was launched on 26 January 2013 at Kochi. The event was attended by Mohanlal, Joshiy, Ratheesh Vegha, Kavya Madhavan, Manoj K. Jayan, and Meera Nandan along with the technical crew and cast of Lokpal.

Track list
No.	Title	Lyrics	Singer(s)	Length
1.	"Mayam Mayam"	Rafeeq Ahmed	Sooraj Santhosh	3:49
2.	"Mizhiyithalil"	Rafeeq Ahmed	Karthik	4:25
3.	"Kunjaruvikal Onnay"	Rafeeq Ahmed	Arun Elta	4:20
4.	"Arjunante"	Rafeeq Ahmed	Sooraj	4:20
5.	"Hari Govinda"	Rafeeq Ahmed	Pradeep Chandrakumar	4:11
6.	"Mayam Mayam Remix"	Rafeeq Ahmed	Sooraj Santhosh, Ratheesh Vegha	4:21
Total length:				25:32
