= Ayali (2023 TV series) =

- Genre: Family; Thriller
- Written by: Muthukumar
- Directed by: Muthukumar
- Starring: Abi Nakshatra; Anumol; Madhan; Linga; Singampuli
- Music by: Revaa
- Country of origin: India
- Original language: Tamil
- No. of seasons: 1
- No. of episodes: 8

Production
- Producer: Kushmavathi
- Cinematography: Ramji
- Editor: Ganesh Siva
- Running time: 40-50 minutes
- Production company: Estrella Stories

Original release
- Network: ZEE5
- Release: 26 January 2023

Ayali is a 2023 Indian Tamil-language streaming television series written and directed by Muthukumar for ZEE5 which focuses on the patriarchal aspects of Tamil society and Indian society in general. The principal characters of the series include Abi Nakshatra, Anumol, Madhan, Linga and Singampuli. The eight episodic series premiered on ZEE5 on 26 January 2023.

== Synopsis ==
The story revolves around the life of a young teenage girl (Tamizhselvi) who defies the horrible 500-year-old customs and traditions that oppress the women of Veerappannai village in Pudukkottai towards her dream of becoming a doctor.

== Cast ==
- Abi Nakshathra as Tamizhselvi
- Anumol as Kuruvammal
- Madhankumar Dhakshinamoorthy as Thavasi
- Linga as Sakthivel
- Singampuli as Thiruppathi
- TSR Srinivasan as Dharmaraj
- Lovelyn Chandrasekar as Mythili
- Gayathri Thara as Kayalvizhi
- Pragadheeswaran as a vocally impaired villager
- Jenson
- Rajamani Melodi
- Goutham
- Reshmi
- Muthupandi
- Sunthar

=== Guest appearances ===
- Lakshmi Priya as Inspector
- Smruthi Venkat as English Teacher
- Bagavathi Perumal as M.L.A
- Kodangi Vadivelu

== Development ==
=== Production ===
The series is produced by Kushmavathi under the production house of Estrella Stories, with music composed by Revaa and screenplay and dialogues by Veenai Maindhan, Sachin, and Muthu Kumar. Muthukumar marked his web series debut with this series.

=== Casting ===
Abi Nakshatra was cast in the female lead role as Tamizhselvi. Malayalam film Actress Anumol was cast as a Tamizhselvi's mother. Madhan, Linga and Singampuli were also selected for supporting roles. Bagavathi Perumal, Lakshmi Priya and Smruthi Venkat also appear as guest stars.

=== Release ===
It was announced on Wednesday 26 January 2023 that the series will be released in Tamil and Telugu languages on ZEE5.

== Episodes ==
=== Season 1 ===
Series	Episodes	Originally released
1	8	26 January 2023

No.	Title	Directed by	Written by	Original release date
1	"The Achievers' Board"	Muthu Kumar	Muthu Kumar	26 January 2023
In the '90s, the people of Veerappannai take pride in marrying off girls as soon as they reach puberty. Tamizh Selvi who hails from that village dreams of becoming a doctor.
2	"The Red Pain"	Muthu Kumar	26 January 2023	
Selvi fears that her doctor dream will fail as soon as she reaches puberty. She realizes that her parents will not support her due to the customs of this village. She prays to God that she should never reach puberty so that she can continue her studies. Selvi goes through puberty.
3	"Kuruvammal Challenge"	Muthu Kumar	Muthu Kumar	26 January 2023
Selvi hides her puberty from everyone and violates the village's most important belief for the sake of her education. While hoping that God will help her keeping it a secret, When Selvi’s puberty is discovered by her mother Kuruvammal, Selvi successfully manages to convince her mother to support her.
4	"Hall Ticket"	Muthu Kumar	Muthu Kumar	26 January 2023
Selvi is the first student in that village to study 10th standard. Many slander her. Selvi happily goes to school despite all the hurdles. A compulsion to go to the town school to write the 10th grade public examination arises for Selvi. Tirupati, the village head forbids Selvi from going out of village citing the customs and restrictions of the village.
5	"Three Flowers"	Muthu Kumar	Muthu Kumar	26 January 2023
Selvi and Kuruvammal are happily travelling to town by bus to write 10th class public examination of Selvi. Selvi's father Thavasi gets injured in an accident. Kuruvammal believes this to be a punishment of god for breaking village customs. She forbids Selvi from going to school.
6	"No Boundaries for Bold Women"	Muthu Kumar	Muthu Kumar	26 January 2023
Selvi's friend Kayalvizhi is getting married. Selvi and Kayalvizhi come up with a plan to stop it by breaking the temple based village custom. It causes great shock in the entire village. It overturns all the customs and rituals that have been practiced in that village all the years.
7	"The Revolution"	Muthu Kumar	Muthu Kumar	26 January 2023
All the women come forward to enter the temple due to Selvi's motivation. She is happy that once the women enter the temple, all the restrictions in the village will be removed and the women will study and live freely. Sakthivel, Thiruppathi’s son crushes her plan to pieces. Selvi reveals the secret of hiding her puberty to save Kayalvizhi.
8	"Ayali"	Muthu Kumar	Muthu Kumar	26 January 2023
Marriage is arranged between Selvi and Sakthivel. All women are trying to stop the marriage. All the women come together and raise the voice for their freedom to break the traditions and customs that is holding them back.

== Reception ==
=== Critical response ===
Anusha Sundar of The New Indian Express wrote "Ayali lacks a consistent storytelling. Ayali’s antagonists are over-the-top caricatures. They stick to all the usual tropes of a villain just to reiterate the core message. This repetitive pattern only creates a sense of detachment and a bitter aftertaste. A little subtleness could have gone a long way to tell this tale that every other woman can relate to."

R. Srinivasan of Cinema Vikatan wrote "Ramji's cinematography captures the warmth of the village and the nature of its people without diminishing realism. Starting with the title sequence, Revaa's music helps convey the impact of several serious scenes. Editor Ganesh Siva has compiled the eight episodes perfectly without losing interest."

Mankandan Sakthivel of Behind Talkies said "All in all “Aayali” is an amazing OTT series that should be watched by people of all ages."

Janani K at India Today rated the series 3.5/5, stating "Director Muthukumar’s Ayali, starring Abi Nakshathra, Anumol and Aruvi Madhan, is a bold show that questions patriarchy and holds a mirror to society. The show is a must-watch, says our review."

Bharathy Singaravel of The News Minute gave 4 stars out of 5 and wrote "Ayali, despite a few flaws, is receiving the praise it well deserves. It gives hope that the Tamil web series genre will choose nuanced storytelling over trying to stretch out cinematic mass moments for its actors."

Bhuvanesh Chandar of The Hindu wrote "the series raises its voice against the socio-religious factors that are used by men to oppress women, but you wish the series used the long format to maximise its potential and with a better screenplay."
