= Edhuvum Nadakkum =

- Directed by: R. Rosario
- Written by: K. Maheswaran
- Produced by: G. Kesavan
- Starring: Karthik Kumar; Aparna Nair
- Cinematography: Bernard S. David
- Edited by: Peter Babiya
- Music by: Raj
- Release date: 4 December 2009
- Running time: 96 minutes
- Country: India
- Language: Tamil

Edhuvum Nadakkum (transl. Anything can happen) is a 2009 Indian Tamil-language psychological thriller film directed by newcomer R. Rosario. The film stars Karthik Kumar and Aparna Nair. It was released in theatres on 4 December 2009.

== Cast ==
- Karthik Kumar as Naga
- Aparna Nair as Pooja
- Suma as Swarna
- Manu Ramalingam as Ramalingam

== Critical reception ==
The New Indian Express wrote "It's an engagingly narrated tale of a disturbed mind exorcising its demons, and about a playful game gone awry. An eerie, bizarre feel is maintained throughout". The Hindu wrote "If only the directors had packed the screenplay with interesting incidents, the digital film running for less than 100 minutes would have been engrossing. Also the camera zooming in on the façade of the bungalow and the passing clouds in the sky every now and then is distracting. If it is meant to have a frightening impact on viewers, it only has the opposite effect". Bhama Devi Ravi of The Times of India rated the film 2.5 out of 5 stars.
