= Varaal (film) =

2022 Indian Malayalam political drama film

- Poster
- വരാൽ
- Directed by: Kannan Thamarakulam
- Written by: Anoop Menon
- Produced by: PA Sebastian
- Starring: Anoop Menon; Prakash Raj; Sunny Wayne; Madhuri Braganza; Priyanka Nair; Gowri Nandha; Renji Panicker; Shankar Ramakrishnan Twinkle Joby
- Cinematography: Ravi K. Chandran
- Edited by: Ayoob Khan
- Music by: Gopi Sunder
- Production company: Time Ads Entertainment
- Release date: 14 October 2022
- Country: India
- Language: Malayalam

Varaal is a 2022 Indian Malayalam-language political drama film written by Anoop Menon and directed by Kannan Thamarakulam. The film stars an ensemble cast including Anoop Menon, Prakash Raj, Sunny Wayne, Madhuri Braganza, Priyanka Nair, Sai Kumar, Jayakrishnan, Suresh Krishna, Shankar Ramakrishnan, Hareesh Peradi, Gowri Nandha,Twinkle Joby, Kollam Tulasi, Renji Panicker, Senthil Krishna, Nandu and Sohan Seenulal. It is produced by PA Sebastian under the banner of Time Ads Entertainment.

== Cast ==
- Anoop Menon as David John Medayil
- Prakash Raj as CM Achuthan Nair
- Sunny Wayne
- Suresh Krishna
- Shankar Ramakrishnan
- Renji Panicker
- Madhuri Braganza
- Priyanka Nair
- Hareesh Peradi
- Nandu
- Kollam Thulasi
- Gowri Nandha
- Senthil Krishna
- Sai Kumar
- Sudheer
- Meghanathan
- Idavela Babu
- Twinkle Joby

== Production ==
The title poster was reveled by Mohanlal, Manju Warrier, Tovino Thomas and Joju George. The film main filmed in Ernakulam, Thiruvananthapuram and Peerumedu. The film got U/A censored. The film was released on 14 October 2022.

== Reception ==
V Vinod Nair critic of Times of india gave 2.5 out of 5 and stated that "You don’t feel any connection with the characters, and while you are waiting for the thrilling suspense at the end, it ends in a whimper". S.R.Praveen of The Hindu critic wrote that "Anoop Menon’s political thriller gets neither the politics nor the thrills right". Crics of The News Minute gave 2 stars out of 5 and stated that "Varaal is bearable if you squirm through the beginning and block out the cringeworthy one-liners, otherwise, not so much". Critics from Mathrubhumi and Indian Express gave mixture of reviews.Critic from Samayam gave 4 out 5 ratings.
