= Kalvan (film) =

- Theatrical release poster
- Directed by: P. V. Shankar
- Written by: P. V. Shankar
- Produced by: G. Dilli Babu
- Starring: G. V. Prakash Kumar; Ivana; Bharathiraja
- Cinematography: P. V. Shankar
- Edited by: San Lokesh
- Music by: Songs: G. V. Prakash Kumar; Score: Revaa
- Production company: Axess Film Factory
- Distributed by: Sakthi Film Factory; Ahimsa Entertainment (UK and Europe)
- Release date: 4 April 2024
- Country: India
- Language: Tamil

Kalvan (transl. Thief) is a 2024 Indian Tamil-language comedy drama film starring G. V. Prakash Kumar. The story revolves around two friends attempting to kill an adopted grand father in an accidental death by elephant to claim the compensation from forest department while one of them falls for a girl. The film released on 4 April 2024 to negative reviews from critics.

== Plot ==
Kemban and Soori are petty thieves in Germalam village bordering Sathyamangalam forests. Kemban meets Balamani, a final year nursing student and falls for her. However, Balamani hates Kemban. Kemban tries to secure a job in the forest department, however, he needs Rs. 2 Lakhs for getting the job. Balamani goes to an old age home for a medical camp for a few days. Knowing this, Kemban joins as a labourer with the help of a contractor doing painting works in the old age home. In the old age home, Balamani meets Azhagar who keeps running away from there often. Balamani pities Azhagar and strikes a bonding with him. Kemban also tries impressing Balamani by befriending Azhagar. Kemban finds out that there are provisions in law to adopt someone from the old age home and decides to adopt Azhagar as his grandfather with the help of a local councilor for which Azhagar also accepts.

Balamani develops a soft corner for Kemban and slowly love blossoms between then. Kemban reveals to Soori about his true intentions of adopting Azhagar. Elephant attacks are common in Kemban's village and government gives Rs. 4 Lakhs for the deceased family members in case of such attacks as compensation. Kemban plans to take Azhagar to the forest and abandon him, so that he could get killed by some elephant and then Kemban can claim the Rs. 4 Lakhs. Kemban tries a few times, but luckily Azhagar gets escaped which irritates Kemban. Also, Kemban gets annoyed as Azhagar takes all the money that Kemban earns.

One day, a tiger comes to the village, and everyone gets shocked. However, Azhagar bravely saves a kid from the tiger attack surprising the villagers. Azhagar tells his flashback that he had run a circus for several years during his youth days and hence he has no fear of animals. Kemban is shocked knowing this as he feels it is difficult to make Azhagar die from an animal attack. Kemban feels dejected and complaints to Balamani about Azhagar taking away all his earnings. However, Balamani tells the truth that Azhagar has been trying hard to help Kemban secure a job in the forest department. Azhagar has been saving the money for the same. Also, Azhagar met Balamani's parents and tried convincing them for her marriage with Kemban. Kemban feels bad knowing the truth.

Meanwhile, Balamani finds out the real intentions of Kemban adopting Azhagar from Soori and gets furious. However, Kemban convinces that he has reformed knowing the real identity of Azhagar. Finally, Azhagar goes into the forest and Kemban arrives on time to save Azhagar. In the end, Kemban and Balamani gets married and Azhagar stays with them.

== Cast ==
- G. V. Prakash Kumar as Kembaraju a.k.a. Kemban
- Bharathiraja as Azhagar
- Ivana as Balamani
- Dheena as Soori
- G. Gnanasambandam as Kumaresan
- Vinoth Munna as Village Chieftain
- Jeeva Ravi as IAS officer
- Hello Kandasamy as Kandasamy
- Cheranraj as Inspector
- Nakkalites Dhanam as Village Chieftain's wife
- Semmalar Annam as District Forest Officer
- Nakkalites Chella as S. Nagaraj

== Soundtrack ==
The soundtrack was composed by G. V. Prakash Kumar and Revaa. The score was made in Hungary.

Song title	Singers
"Adi Kattazhagu Karuvaachi"	G. V. Prakash Kumar
"Oru Kozhi Mutta"	Santhosh Hariharan
"Pesaama Pesum Kannu"	Kalyani Nair
"Damakku Damakku"	Anthony Daasan
"Kalavaani Pasanga"	Anthony Daasan

== Release ==
=== Theatrical ===
Kalvan was scheduled to release in theatres on 4 April 2024.

=== Home media ===
The digital streaming rights were acquired by Disney+ Hotstar and the satellite rights were acquired by Vijay TV. The film had its digital premiere on the streaming platform from 10 May 2024.

== Reception ==
A critic from The Times of India rated the film two out of five stars and wrote that "Kalvan is a film that gives off the feeling that a lot is happening while also simultaneously making you think that absolutely nothing is playing out on screen". A critic from OTTplay gave the film the 2 out of 5 stars and wrote that "Despite its decent performances by its lead cast, there is an inevitable lag in its storytelling and Kalvan does not seem to sense it". Prashanth Vallavan from Cinema Express rated the film 1.5 out of 5 stars and wrote that "With a loosely packed screenplay that trudges from one pointless scene to another, and weak dialogues that damage competent performances, Kalvan has enough vacuous moments that make us zone out and question the point of its existence."
