= Red Salute (2006 film) =

- Directed by: Vinod Vijayan
- Screenplay by: A. Sajeevan
- Story by: Rassaque Thykavu
- Produced by: Milan Jaleel
- Starring: Kalabhavan Mani
- Cinematography: Vinod Illampally
- Edited by: Vivek Harshan
- Music by: Alex Paul
- Production company: Galaxy Films
- Release date: 10 August 2006
- Language: Malayalam

Red Salute is a 2006 Malayalam film that was directed by Vinod Vijayan and produced by Milan Jaleel. The film starred Kalabhavan Mani as Chaala Vaasu, an activist and head load worker.

== Plot ==
Red Salute follows the character of Chala Vaasu, a coolie that eventually works his way to the top of the abkari liquor trade business. Despite this bringing him great fortune, Vaasu begins to realize that this fortune comes with its own problems and starts longing for his former life and the simplicity he thinks it brought.

== Cast ==
- Kalabhavan Mani as Chala Vasu
- Sridevika as Annie Joseph Thomas
- Kottayam Nazeer as Ramanan
- Cochin Haneefa as Hamsa Koya
- Janardhanan as Medayil Ittichan
- Devan as Kolappalli Govindan
- Captain Raju as Joseph Thomas
- Vijayaraghavan as Bapputty Haji
- Bheeman Raghu as Marthandan Velayudhan
- Baburaj as C.I. Morchary Mathews
- Dinesh Prabhakar as Mohanan
- Abu Salim as S.I. Madhu
- KPAC Lalitha as Madhaviyamma
- Niyaz as Peter
- Sadiq as Rajashekharan
- Subair as Muttathara Sudhakaran
- Ramu as S.P. Mohammed Kasim
- Kalabhavan Shajohn as Sa. Karunan
- Kollam Ajith as Muniswamy
- Gayathri as Sulochana Karunan
- Shahnu as Sudha
- Urmila Unni as Mariya Joseph
- Nivia Rebin - Cameo Appearance
- Maya Viswanath - Cameo Appearance
- Sajitha Betti- Cameo Appearance
