= Mughizh =

2021 film by Karthik Swaminathan

- Theatrical release poster
- Directed by: Karthik Swaminathan
- Written by: Karthik Swaminathan
- Produced by: Vijay Sethupathi
- Starring: Vijay Sethupathi; Sreeja Vijay Sethupathi; Regina Cassandra
- Cinematography: Sathya Ponmar
- Edited by: R. Govindaraj
- Music by: Revaa
- Production companies: Vijay Sethupathi Productions; Pocket Money Films
- Release date: 8 October 2021
- Running time: 62 minutes
- Country: India
- Language: Tamil

Mughizh (transl. Birth of a fragrance) is a 2021 Indian Tamil-language drama film directed by Karthik Swaminathan. The film was produced by Vijay Sethupathi under the banner Vijay Sethupathi Productions, who also stars in the lead role along with Regena Cassandrra and Sethupathi's daughter Shreeja in prominent roles, the latter in her film debut. The music is composed by Revaa, with cinematography handled by Sathya Ponmar and edited by R. Govindaraj. The film released theatrically on 8 October 2021 to positive reviews from critics.

== Plot ==
Kavya, a 12-year-old girl, embraces solitude and exists like an island within herself. Her parents decide to make inroads into that island, wanting her to face her fears head on. Being completely aware that the 'doggie zone' is a realm that is completely out of bounds for her, they still go ahead and bring a puppy home. Well, what transpires when this darling monster steps into this household? Does the wall within Kavya break, and when this decision of the parents backfires, do demons pile up adding on to the already existing fears within Kavya? Or does this mammoth experience transform her, and does it propel her to blossom, exuding the first ever enriching fragrance of life. Her parents are at the threshold of assessing their parental skills and decisions. Mughizh is about a family 's life journey, where each member finds a new fragrance that would change the prism they view life through for posterity.

== Cast ==
- Vijay Sethupathi as Vijay
- Sreeja Vijay Sethupathi as Kavya
- Regena Cassandrra as Radhika

Scooby, Shadow, Milo, Simbha, Browny, Sheeba, Buddy, Blackie also star in the film as Kavya's pet dog and his friends.

== Production ==
=== Casting ===
The director had approached Vijay Sethupathi one of the leading actors in the Tamil film industry to act in this independent film focusing on how parenthood is not about having a quick fix to every issue of your child but it is an ongoing process of learning and embracing each other, as parents and children transform individually through life's trial and tribulations.The star initially thought that the director was approaching him to produce the film, while he was actually pitching the idea to him as an actor. Without any second thoughts he accepted to act and also produce the film under his own banner Vijay Sethupathi productions. Karthik Swaminathan, an assistant of cinematographer-director Jeeva, with whom he worked in Unnale Unnale (film),Dhaam_Dhoom (film) has directed this film.

Regina Cassandra was approached just few days before shooting commenced. She was very busy with her other film schedules but she did make time for the film, as she brought an extremely fresh breath of air to the role of a young mother.

For the role of the 12-year-old girl the director had initially cast a trained actor, but later, on seeing Shreeja who had never faced the camera before, the director wanted to cast her, for the organic fabric she exuded intrinsically. Kavya's character is of a child who likes to exist in her own world of fantasies which give her immense joy. The characterisation of Kavya was very similar to Shreeja's, which turned out to be the biggest boon in bringing to life the character and the core essence of the film.

She made her film debut. Though the team did not disclose the details about the crew members and the film's title, the film was reported to have four actors as a part of the principal cast. Sethupathi revealed that it is a "feel-good film about family and relationships". Scooby was happily riding on a bike when he was chased down to get his consent. Which thankfully the crew managed to get. He was a complete riot. Extremely difficult to control. Scooby was not the kind of dog who paid heed to training. This turned out to be a blessing in disguise as the crew learnt to work around him and hence the shots they canned were so organic that it retained as well as enhanced the core grain of Mughizh.

=== Filming ===
The principal filming of the film began in October 2019, and was completed by February 2020, as the film was shot in multiple schedules according to the availability of the artistes who were busy with their other projects.

The filming days were 15 in total, and the shoot happened in and around Chennai, especially few scenes at Marina Beach in Chennai. People who had gathered to witness the shoot were extremely surprised when they saw stars arriving at the shoot which comprised such a small crew and an extremely simple production design to boot.

Post-production for the film began in early November 2019 and team began works on editing, dubbing, re-recording, digital intermediate, color grading and special effects. During the occasion of New Year's Eve (31 December 2020), Vijay Sethupathi announced the title of the film as Mughizh, with the technical crew of the film consisting of female composer Revaa as music composer, Sathya Ponmar as cinematographer, A. S. Laxmi Narayanan as sound designer and R. Govindaraj, who worked with Sethupathi in '96 and Tughlaq Durbar was the editor. N. Shanmuga Sundaram, who worked as the cinematographer in '96, handled the promotional stills for the film, with posters designed by Gopi Prasannaa. In addition, director Balaji Tharaneetharan joined the technical team as lyricist and dialogue writer, with Pradeep Kumar and Malvi Sundaresan serving vocals for the songs. The film is produced by Sethupathi himself under his own banner Vijay Sethupathi Productions, for which the film intended to be their debut venture in digital space, until Vijay Sethupathi planned to release the film in theatres.

== Soundtrack ==
The music and background score is composed by female composer Revaa. Mughizh marks Revaa's entry into Tamil cinema. She has earlier worked on Malayalam film Mangalyam Thanthunaena, Marathi film College Diary besides composing for digital media, pilot films and more than 200 ad jingles.

Mughizh's soundtrack has 3 songs. The Maayakkaara song brings to life the family's bonding with Scooby. The song composed by Revaa was written by Balaji Tharaneetharan, sung by Govind Vasantha and Malvi Sundaresan. Before Maayakkaara, the team had another song composed for the same situation. But while shooting, the scenes demanded a different graph altogether based on Scooby s reactions. Post watching the visuals the team decided to compose a new song to go with the visual mood. Based on the entire graph of Scooby and the family, Maayakkaara was composed depicting the beautiful bonding that transpires within the family because of scooby's homecoming.

The first track titled "Maayakaara" released to good reception, gained popularity for its freshness and soothing music.

The Mughizh theme song, is inspired from Kaavya's backstory. The world of the film is depicted through the theme song which is an inspiration propelled by the beautiful waves of the sea. The movie begins with the theme song and ends with the theme song, just like how life comes a full circle. The theme also conveys the subtle and natural realisations which each family member goes through in Mughizh. The film ends with the lyric version of the theme song called Oyaadha alai pole, sung by Pradeep Kumar, written by Balaji Tharanreetharan.

The entire Background score of Mughizh has a subtlety throughout that reflects the fragile storyline. The organic acoustic treatment was deliberately done to make the mood more personal and heart warming.

Track listing
No.	Title	Singer(s)	Length
1.	"Maayakaara"	Govind Vasantha, Malvi Sundaresan	05:39
2.	"Oyaadha Alai Poley"	Pradeep Kumar	03:05
3.	"Mughizh Theme"	Pradeep Kumar	03:05

== Release ==
On 1 January 2021, coinciding with New Year's Day, the makers unveiled the trailer of the film to positive response from viewers. Following the reception, the makers started negotiating with leading over-the-top media service platforms such as Amazon Prime Video, Netflix, Disney+ Hotstar and ZEE5 to release the film, unlike other short films which released directly through YouTube. However, as the negotiations failed to happen, the team intended for a direct premiere on YouTube. Further, the team had planned to market the film in television, where they were about to team up with satellite TV channels to acquire the rights and also to recover production costs. Later, Vijay Sethupathi announced that the film will be released theatrically on 8 October 2021. A teaser of 30 seconds was released on 1 October, a week before the release date, confirming that the film would have a theatrical release. It is the first Tamil film of a shorter duration (62 minutes) to be released in theatres.

The film saw its theatrical release in October 2021 after the pandemic, when the lockdown was relaxed, with a 50 percent occupancy in multiplexes around Tamil Nadu and other major cities in India.

== Critical reception ==
Srivatsan S of The Hindu said that "Mughizh is strictly for all the dog lovers and their cohorts whom you usually spot at the beach on a Sunday morning. The family-friendly entertainer brims you with warmth." Writing for The New Indian Express, Bhuvanesh Chandar said "Mughizh reflects on several deep topics, including overcoming fear, handling grief, raising children, and of course, the love that dogs are capable of". M. Suganth, editor-in-chief of The Times of India called it as "a film that easily works better than the underwhelming anthologies that we have been getting since the pandemic". Ashameera Aiyyappan of Firstpost stated "Amid all the gangster dramas, action thrillers and the blood-soaked action that we see our top stars constantly indulge in, the mere fact that a marketable hero would accept a premise like this, feels like a miracle. This is why VJS, regardless of his successes or failures, is an actor that we always root for." Vishal Menon of Film Companion South stated "Mughizh holds its frames to give viewers the space to figure it out for ourselves with its minimal approach. What this is able to achieve is navigate a minefield of emotions without ever resorting to sentimentality. At first, we mistake this as being simplistic and a tad too plain. But soon, you warm up to it and you understand why this approach was chosen." Abhishek Joshi of Dogwithblog wrote an entire blog on the movie and mentioned that,"Mughizh offers deep reflections on parenting, grief, and life itself".The movie explores grief from a child's eyes but also widens the viewfinder to include the parents, and how pain passes through the triad. While Kavya is laden with guilt, the parents are hurting through the loss of the pet and their child's indifference. Reiterating how every loss is a personal journey and seeks its own time to come to terms with it.
