= Masala Republic =

- Official Poster
- Directed by: Visakh G. S.
- Screenplay by: Arungeorge K. David
- Story by: Visakh G. S.
- Produced by: Sukumar Thekkepat
- Starring: Indrajith Sukumaran; Aparna Nair; Sunny Wayne; Vinay Forrt; Soubin Shahir; Vinayakan; Sreenath Bhasi; Shine Tom Chacko
- Cinematography: Suresh Rajan
- Edited by: Manoj Kannoth
- Music by: Jassie Gift
- Production company: Chemmeen Cinema
- Release date: 2014
- Country: India
- Language: Malayalam

Masala Republic is a 2014 Indian Malayalam-language dystopian political satirical spoof film directed by Visakh G. S. in his directorial debut. It stars an ensemble cast consisting of Indrajith Sukumaran, Aparna Nair, Sunny Wayne, Captain Raju, P. Balachandran, Mamukkoya, Shine Tom Chacko, Vinayakan, Vinay Forrt, and Mala Aravindan. The story of the film was written by the director, and the screenplay by Arungeorge K. David.

The film is produced by Sukumar Thekkepat under the banner of Chemmeen Cinema. The music is composed by Jassie Gift and Kolkata-based band Mrittika while the background scores are by the Widvaan band. Suresh Rajan is behind the camera while Manoj Kannoth did the editing works, and the songs were choreographed by Imithiyas Aboobacker. The film was released on 25 April 2014. It mainly received negative reviews at that time because the Indian audience didn't have much familiarity with Spoof films. But later, the film was considered one of the best Experimental film in Malayalam.

== Cast ==
- Indrajith Sukumaran as S.I. Shambu, Circle Inspector Anti Gutka Squad
- Aparna Nair as Shreya, TV Reporter
- Sunny Wayne as Bada Bhai, Perumbavoor based mafia don
- Vinayakan as Bengali Babu, a labour supplier
- Soubin Shahir as Althaf
- Sreenath Bhasi as Anto
- Vinay Forrt as Ambu
- Shine Tom Chacko as Shivaprasad
- Amith Chakalakkal as AGS Officer Firoz
- P. Balachandran as Pattanam Balan
- Rajesh Sharma as Sudhakaran Thuruthy
- Mamukkoya as Beeranikka
- Mala Aravindan as Rappayichan
- Captain Raju as Chinese Chandran
- Vijayakumar Prabhakaran as Prince
- Sajeev Kumar as AGS Officer Mujeeb
- Sumangal as Sanju Bhai
- Rupesh Bhimta as Bhimta
- Anfas Ansary as Pempa
- Sundara Pandian as AGS Officer Kishore
- Anju Kurian as News Reporter Akhila Varma
- Srinda Arhaan as AGS Officer Nagavally
- Kani Kusruti as AGS Officer Kani
- Divya M Nair as Selin
- Pavithra Menon as Akhila Varma
- Sobhana George as Excise & Health Minister S. Sreekala
- Adv. Jayashankar as Himself
- Chemban Vinod Jose as M.L.A Perumbavoor Ajayan (Photo Presence Only)

== Music ==
Masala Republic

Soundtrack album by Jassie Gift
- Released: July 17, 2014
- Genre: Filmi
- Length: 17:57
- Label: Satyam Audios
- Producer: Jassie Gift

Jassie Gift chronology
Aryan (film) (2014)	Masala Republic (2014)	Hara (film) (2014)

No.	Title	Singer(s)	Length
1.	"Kalichiri"	Indrajith Sukumaran, Sumi Aravind	4:13
2.	"Adada"	Anu Praveen, Renjin Raj Varma	4:34
3.	"Nodi Bhora - Male Version"	Suchal Chakroborthi	3:44
4.	"Nodi Bhora - Female Version"	Madhubanthi Bagchi	3:08
5.	"Shambu's Raid Song"	Jassie Gift, Band Vidwan	2:16
Total length:			17:57

== Release ==
The trailer of the film was released on 23 March 2014. The film was scheduled to be a 25 April 2014 release.
