= Pakal Nakshatrangal =

- Directed by: Rajeev Nath
- Screenplay by: Anoop Menon
- Story by: Rajeev Nath
- Produced by: Chaya Films
- Starring: Mohanlal; Suresh Gopi; Murali; Anoop Menon; Lakshmi Gopalaswamy
- Narrated by: Anoop Menon
- Cinematography: Ramachandra Babu
- Edited by: K. Sreenivas
- Music by: Songs: Shahabaz Aman; Score: Sharreth
- Production company: Chaya Films
- Distributed by: Chaya Films
- Release date: 29 November 2008
- Running time: 120 minutes
- Country: India
- Language: Malayalam

Pakal Nakshatrangal (transl. Daytime Stars) is a 2008 Indian Malayalam-language drama film directed by Rajeev Nath and written by Anoop Menon from a story by Nath. It was the debut screenplay of Menon. The film stars Mohanlal, Suresh Gopi, Murali, Kalpana, Anoop Menon, and Lakshmi Gopalaswamy. It is about the lives of a group of intellectuals in Kerala in the later half of the 1990s. The film was critically acclaimed.

== Plot ==
Pakal Nakshatrangal tells the story of Siddharthan, narrated by Siddharthan's son, Adi, to his wife as the content of his new book. Siddharthan is a brilliant filmmaker but leads a Casanova lifestyle entwined with women, alcohol, and drugs. His house 'Daffodils' is his salvation and the epicentre for art with his big bunch of friends.

One day, Siddarthan is found dead at Daffodils. His untimely death is considered suspicious but eludes the police due to lack of evidence. Adi decides to dig into his father's past and solve the mystery surrounding his death. Adi converses with Siddharthan's friends, reads his diary and articles, and gets help from a psychic, Dr. Vaidyanathan. The story revolves around what Adi finds out about his father's life and how he finds out the truth about the mysterious death.

Adi continues investigating the mysterious death of his father, Sidharthan, a renowned filmmaker. He meets Thilakan, the retired police officer who originally handled the case. Thilakan confides that he always believed Sidharthan was murdered—pushed off the terrace of Daffodils—but the case lacked evidence to proceed. His original suspects included Madhavan (Sidharthan's close friend), Lopez (a man from Kochi), and a film producer. With the producer ruled out, Thilakan pursued Lopez, a shady character who had tried to exploit his sister Aida by offering her to Sidharthan during a film shooting where Aida was cast in a supporting role. However he learns from Aida that Lopez died of a lightning strike a couple of months after the incident.

Adi rules out Madhavan as a suspect, despite a past disagreement with Sidharthan. Through Madhavan, he learns about a talented but troubled poet who once joined their circle. The poet believed that true life began after death, inspiring a screenplay admired by Sidharthan. Their debates on death led to conflict between Madhavan and Sidharthan, and the poet eventually took his own life to experience his maniacal theory of life after death, a decision he had allegedly justified to his wife Raji, who was later forced into prostitution. Raji confirms that Sidharthan admits to witnessing the poet's suicide when both of them were high on weed.

Adi also meets Dr. Usha, a homeopathy doctor and Sidharthan's former lover who used to have an affair with him behind her husband's back, who reveals that Sidharthan had a mysterious phone relationship with an anonymous woman he never met. Suffering from a terminal illness (implied to be cancer or an STD), he wanted to die with dignity rather than endure a slow decline, in contrast to his otherwise undisciplined, life-loving persona.

Seeking further clarity, Adi consults Dr. Vaidyanathan, an eccentric professor who claims to have spoken with Sidharthan's spirit. As Adi assembles the pieces, the story evolves into a biographical portrait of his father.

In the end, Adi reveals to his wife that his mother, Maidhili—Sidharthan's wife—was the one who killed him. A devoted but neglected spouse, Maidhili had posed as the anonymous caller to feel closer to her estranged husband. Upon learning of his illness and his wish for a swift death, she confronted him on the terrace and pushed him, with Sidharthan recognizing her identity just before falling. Adi claims that his father revealed this truth to him in a dream.

== Cast ==
- Mohanlal as Sidharthan
- Suresh Gopi as Dr. Vaidhyanathan
- Anoop Menon as Aadhi Sidharthan
  - Ganapathi as young Aadhi Sidharthan
- Lakshmi Gopalaswamy as Aadhi's wife
- Manianpilla Raju as Tharakan
- Kalpana as Raji
- Reena Basheer as Dr. Usha
- K. B. Venu as Madhavan, Sidharthan's friend
- Nishanth Sagar as Thushar
- Murugan
- N. L. Balakrishnan
- Balachandran Chullikkadu
- Jagannathan
- Sukumari

== Awards ==
Mohanlal got the Kerala Film Critics Award and the Mathrubhumi Film Awards for Best Actor for this film.
