= Vinod Vijayan =

Indian film director, writer and producer

Vinod K Vijayan
- Vijayan in 2015
- Born: Ernakulam, Kerala, India
- Occupations: Director, Producer, Screenwriter
- Spouse: Swati Vinod

Vinod Kumar Vijayan is an Indian film director, writer and producer. He is known for his works in Malayalam and Telugu cinema. His films include Quotation (2004),and Red Salute (2006).

== As director ==
Vijayan began assisting with filming under the guidance of K. K. Haridas and Rajeev Ravi. His first film, MASK, has won the International Video Festival award in the category of best short film. His debut in mainstream filmmaking as a director was with the 2004 Malayalam Film Quotation. Rajeev Ravi was the cinematographer for the film.

His second film as a director was Red Salute, starring Kalabhavan Mani and Sree Devika in lead roles. This film was also the debut film of cinematographer Vinod Illampally and editor Vivek Harshan.

Vijayan also directed Sarva Shiksha Abhiyan, a message-oriented short film for girls' education in India. The film starred child actor Esther Anil as the protagonist. His next film was Malayalam anthology film D Company - The Day of Judgement (2013). Vijayan's installment in the anthology starred Fahadh Faasil and Bhama in lead roles.

As of 2019, Vijayan is directing a Telugu feature film, "OKA PATHAKAM PRAKARAM" starring Sairam Shankar in the lead role. The Cinematography is by Rajeev Ravi, editing by Vivek Harshan, art by Santosh Raman, makeup by Pattanam Shah and Pattanam Rasheed, and musical score by Rahul Raj.

== As producer ==
Vinod Vijayan has produced a number of films including Annayum Rasoolum (2013), and Ottaal (2015).

== Filmography ==
Year	Title	Credited as			Language
Year	Title	Director	Producer	Story	Language
2004	Quotation	Yes		Yes	Malayalam
2006	Red Salute	Yes			Malayalam
2010	Sarva Shiksha Abhiyaan	Yes	Yes	Yes	Malayalam
2013	Annayum Rasoolum		Yes		Malayalam
2013	D Company	Yes	Yes		Malayalam
2015	Ottaal		Yes		Malayalam
2025	Oka Padhakam Prakaram	Yes	Yes	Yes	Telugu
