= Ratheesh Vega =

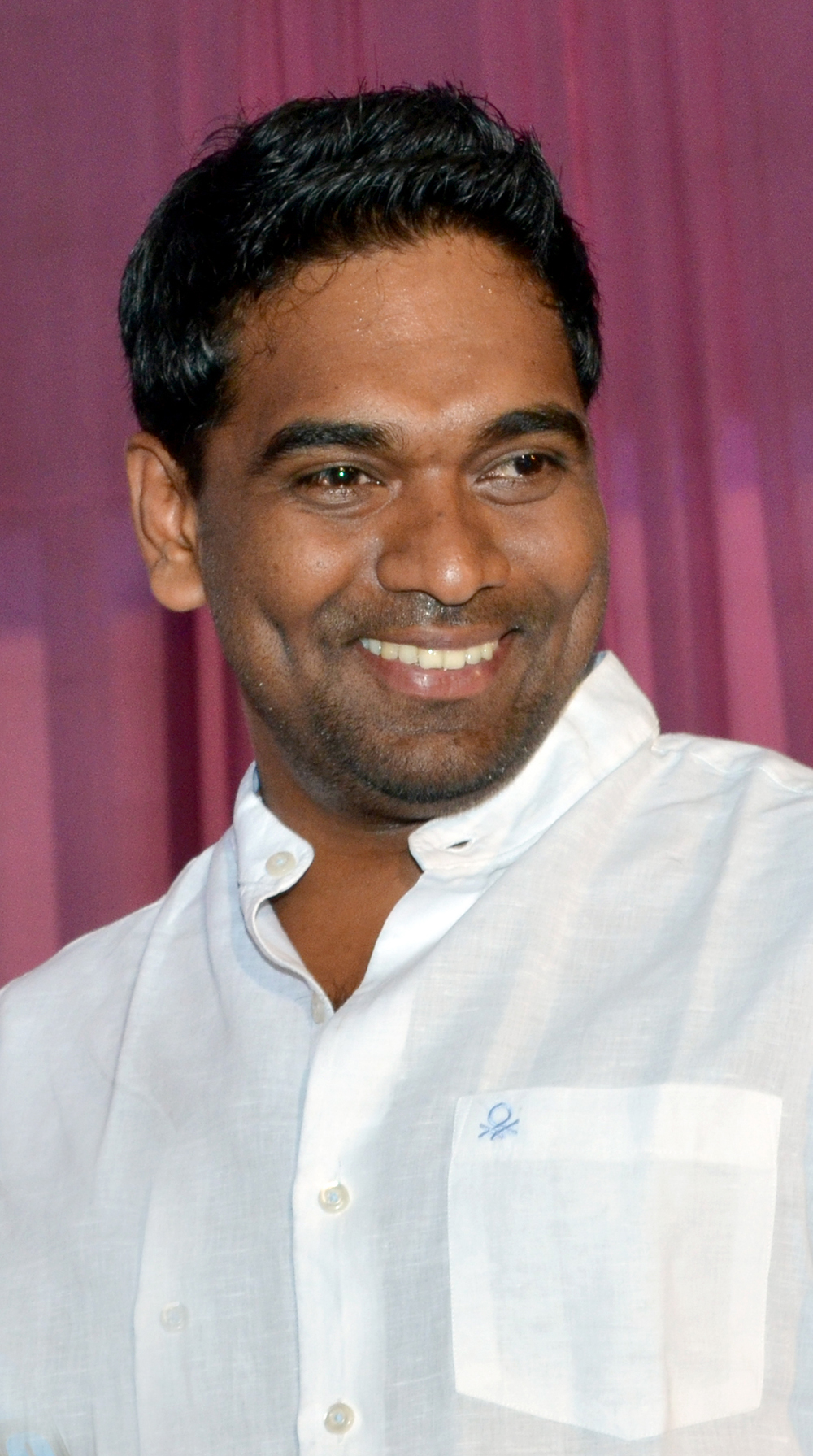
- Ratheesh Vega

Background information
- Born: Palakkad, Kerala, India; Residence - Chennai, Tamil Nadu, India
- Genres: Pop, Indian Classical Music, soft rock, world music
- Occupations: Music composer, Music producer, Singer, Music Director, Arranger, Sequencer, Writer
- Years active: 2010–present

Ratheesh Vega is a director, composer, singer, and musician who works in Malayalam films. He debuted as a film music composer in the 2010 hit film Cocktail.

== Career ==
Ratheesh completed his degree in music at Madras University. After his degree, Ratheesh pursued a short course in sound engineering. But all the while he nursed hopes of becoming a Carnatic vocalist. He learned music from Thrissur R. Vaidyanatha Bhagavathar.

For nearly two years Ratheesh spearheaded Music Talks on Malayalam channel Asianet. This show also provided the turnaround in Ratheesh's career. "It was during this time that I met Gopi Sunder, the noted music director and programmer. He told me that I could try my hand at composing music and also introduced me to many people in the music field. I believed in Gopi Sunder." -says Ratheesh Vega.

He has done jingles in all the South Indian languages with numerous clients and for many big brands. Some of them like Kalyan Silks, Josco, MCR and Joy Alukkas did a lot to soar his stock. Ratheesh won the Pepper Award in 2010 for his striking jingles.

In between all this, Ratheesh worked on a couple of albums. And these albums helped find his way into films. Of these 'Cafe Love' and 'Njanum Ente Ayyappa' had tunes with the typical Ratheesh Vegha stamp a judicious blend of the East and West styles of music. "The Ayyappa devotional for Vox Music, US, was designed quite differently from the usual ones of the genre. It was priced at seven dollars and sold around 5,000 copies. But it was 'Café Love' (Sathyam Audios) that gave me my film break."- Remembers Ratheesh.

'Café Love' had tracks sung by Unni Menon, Sujatha Mohan, Biju Narayanan, Vineeth Sreenivasan, Benny Dayal, Gopi Sunder and others. It had some melodies like Unni Menon's 'Ormayil...' and the trendy pop-styled 'Nestle coffee...' by Biju Narayanan and Thulasi Yatheendran.

He was introduced to Milan Jaleel, by one of his friends, who had heard the music of 'Cafe Love.' He immediately offered Ratheesh a chance in his film Cocktail. The Music of Cocktail turned out to be his best soundtrack, in which the songs like Neeyam Thanalinu by Vijay Yesudas and Thulasi Yatheendran topped the charts for weeks. And then the second chance for him came from Milan Jaleel himself to work in his next project, 'Kasargod Khaderbhai'.

== Personal life ==
Ratheesh lives in Thrissur with his wife Dr. Anu Ratheesh Vega and children Nadhin Ratheesh Vega and Nirnav Ratheesh Vega

== Discography ==
=== As music director ===
- Note: all films are in Malayalam, unless otherwise noted.

Year	Film	Score	Songs	Notes
2010	Cocktail	Yes	Yes	Film Debut
2010	Again Kasargod Khader Bhai	Yes	Yes	
2011	Ulakam Chuttum Valiban	Yes	No	
2011	Pachuvum Kovalanum	Yes	No	
2011	Beautiful	Yes	Yes	Kochi Times Film Award for Best Music Director; Mirchi Music Awards South for Best Upcoming Music Director
2012	Orkut Oru Ormakoot	Yes	No	
2012	Mullassery Madhavan Kutty Nemom P. O.	Yes	Yes	
2012	Namukku Parkkan	Yes	Yes	
2012	Run Babby Run	Yes	Yes	CERA BIG Malayalam Music Award, 97.2 BIG FM for Most Popular Song
2012	Poppins	Yes	Yes	
2012	Matinee	Yes	Yes	
2013	Lokpal	Yes	Yes	
2013	David and Goliath	Yes	Yes	
2013	Rebecca Uthup Kizhakkemala	Yes	Yes	
2013	Lucky Star	Yes	Yes	
2013	Ladies and Gentleman	Yes	Yes	
2013	Orissa	Yes	Yes	Kerala Film Critics Association Award for Best Music Director
2013	D Company	Yes	Yes	
2013	Silence	Yes	Yes	
2014	Athithi	Yes	No	Tamil film
2014	Picket 43	Yes	Yes	
2015
2015	Yanam Mahayanam	Yes	Yes	
2016	Aadupuliyattam	Yes	Yes	
2016	Marubhoomiyile Aana	Yes	Yes	
2016	Swarnakkaduva	Yes	Yes	
2017	Achayans	Yes	Yes	
2019	Ilayaraja	Yes	Yes	
2019	Fancy Dress	Yes	Yes	
2019	King Fish	Yes	Yes	
2023	Half Pants Full Pants	Yes	Yes	Hindi Amazon web series
2024	Virunnu	No	Yes	
2025	Cherukkanum Pennum	Yes	Yes	

=== As a writer ===
Year	Film	Notes
2019	Thrissur Pooram	

=== As an actor ===
Year	Film	Notes
2021	Eighteen Hours	

== Non-film albums ==
Year	Album title	Notes
2010	Cafe Love	
2010	Naanum ente ayyappa	

== Awards ==
- Best Music Director for Orissa – Kerala Film Critics Association Awards 2013
- Popular Song Award for "Aatumanal Payayil" Run Babby Run – CERA BIG Malayalam Music Award, 97.2 BIG FM 2013
- Best Music Director for Beautiful – The Kochi Times Film Award 2011
- Best Upcoming Music Director for Beautiful – Mirchi Music Awards South 2011
- Best song award for "Janmandarangal" Orissa
- Best Music Director for cocktail Ramu Kariat Film Awards 2010
- Best Music Director for "Mazhaneer Thullikal" Beautiful - Gireesh Puthenchery Award
