= Mangalyam Thanthunanena =

- Movie poster
- Directed by: Soumya Sadanandan
- Written by: Tony Madathil
- Produced by: Alwin Antony; Zachariah Thomas; Prince Paul; Angelena Mary Antony
- Starring: Kunchacko Boban; Nimisha Sajayan
- Cinematography: Arvind Krishna
- Edited by: Christy Sebastian
- Music by: Songs: Revaa; Background Score: Bijibal
- Production company: United Global Media Entertainment
- Distributed by: United Global Media Release
- Release date: 20 September 2018
- Country: India
- Language: Malayalam

Mangalyam Thanthunanena is a 2018 Indian Malayalam-language satire film directed by Soumya Sadanandan (in her directorial debut) and written by Tony Madathil, starring Kunchacko Boban and Nimisha Sajayan. The film was released on 20 September 2018.

== Plot ==
Roy and Clara are a newly married couple, Roy is an irresponsible spendthrift who has trouble managing his finances. Clara's nature is exactly the opposite. When Roy comes home from Dubai for his wedding, he learns that he has been terminated from his job. The marriage was fine during the first three months or so, but the going gets tough as Roy wants money urgently to pay off his debts. Clara suggests that he applies to work at her wealthy dad's bank or ask her father for some financial help. But Roy is too proud to do that. He wants Clara to give her ornaments to pledge for a bank loan or to sell them. When she refuses, their relationship gets shaky. The film revolves around the events that unfold following this crisis and how he manages to sort things out.

== Cast ==
- Kunchacko Boban as Roy
- Nimisha Sajayan as Clara, Roy's wife
- Hareesh Perumanna as Shamzudheen
- Shanthi Krishna as Thresiyamma, Roy's mother
- Vijayaraghavan as Avarachan, Clara's father
- Alencier Ley Lopez as Prof. Kuruvila Eliyas
- Leona Lishoy as Susan Thomas
- Sunil Sukhada as Palisha Rappayi
- Salim Kumar as Father Kuriyakose Tharayill
- Chempil Ashokan as Koora
- Rony David as George, Roy's brother-in-law
- Pauly Valsan as Thressiyama's mother
- Soubin Shahir as guest appearance
- Kochu Preman as Babu
- Gokulan as Kuttappayi
- Rajesh Panavally
- Sankar Induchoodan as Titto
- Mamukoya as Kuriyan paraykal
- Jomon K John as Thamara Shibu
- Molly Kannamaly as Valsa
- Gayathri Varsha as Korah's wife
- Baby

== Music ==
Mangalyam Thanthunanena features four music directors composing six songs. Azim Roshan, S. Shankars, Sayanora Philip and Reva and was penned by Din Nath Puthencherry and Mirshad Kaipamangalam. The background score was carried out by Bijibal.

== Track listing ==
Track listing
No.	Title	Lyrics	Music	Singer(s)	Length
1.	"Melle Mulle"	Din Nath Puthencherri	Revaa	Job Kurian, Shanthi Krishna, Vijayaraghavan & Alencier	3:45
2.	"Ariyathe Nin Mizhikalil"	Mirshad Kaipamangalam	S. Shankars	Vijay Yesudas & Mridhula Warrier	5:20
3.	"Azhikumbol Murukana Palakuruku"	Din Nath Puthencherri	Azim Roshan	Vaikom Vijayalakshmi	3:15
4.	"Mounam"	Din Nath Puthencherri	Sayanora Philip	Rajalakshmi & Sooraj Santhosh	3:15
5.	"Chase Theme"	Din Nath Puthencherri	Revaa	Deepesh Krishnamoorthy, Arun Gopan, Midhun Suresh & Sachin Raj	02:25
6.	"Mounam Unplugged"	Din Nath Puthencherri	Sayanora Philip	Sayanora Philip	03:11
Total length:					21:11

== Production ==
The film marks the feature film directorial debut of Soumya Sadanandan after the documentary Chembai: My Discovery of a Legend. Sathanandan described the film as "a family satire reminiscent of the old Balachandra Menon films".

== Release ==
The film was released on 20 September 2018.

== Reception ==
The Times of India rated it 3 out of 5 and said that "It is a simple film without much to boast off". New Indian Express rated the film 3 out of 5, saying "This is a film that doesn't aim too high. It is content with being what it really is: a simple, old-fashioned, and feel-good family entertainer". Filmibeat rated it 3 out of 5 and said that " The film will take us back to the stories that we have seen in the 80s/90s, but it is set in today's time. The film might be clichéd at parts but it delivers what it intended and it has some genuinely good moments to offer for the audiences.
