= Chiram (film) =

- Directed by: Sindhu Paradayil; N. Sudheer
- Produced by: Sathyajith Nair
- Starring: Anoop Menon; Aishwarya Mithun Koroth; Srikant Murali; Shelly Kishore; Geethi Sangeetha
- Cinematography: Anand Balakrishnan
- Music by: M. Jayachandran; Girish Narayanan
- Distributed by: Sathyajith Films through Valluvanadan Cinema Company
- Release date: October 9, 2026 (India)
- Country: India
- Language: Malayalam

Chiram is a 2026 Indian Malayalam-language romantic drama film directed by Sindhu Paradayil and N. Sudheer. The film stars Anoop Menon and Aishwarya Mithun Koroth, with Srikant Murali, Shelly Kishore and Geethi Sangeetha in supporting roles. It was produced by Sathyajith Nair under the banner Sathyajith Productions and was released in theatres on 9 October 2026.

== Cast ==
- Anoop Menon
- Aishwarya Mithun Koroth
- Srikant Murali
- Shelly Kishore
- Geethi Sangeetha
- Ambili
- Tejaswini Bhakt

== Production ==
The film was directed by Sindhu Paradayil and N. Sudheer and produced by Sathyajith Nair under the Sathyajith Productions banner. The music was composed by M. Jayachandran and Girish Narayanan, and the cinematography was by Anand Balakrishnan.

== Release ==
Chiram was released in theatres on 9 October 2026. It was distributed by Sathyajith Films through Valluvanadan Cinema Company.
