= Virunnu =

2024 Indian action drama film

- Theatrical release poster
- Directed by: Kannan Thamarakkulam
- Written by: Dinesh Pallath
- Produced by: Gireesh Neyyar
- Starring: Arjun Sarja; Nikki Galrani
- Cinematography: Ravi Chandran; Pradeep Nair
- Edited by: V. T. Sreejith
- Music by: Songs: Ratheesh Vega; Saanand George Grace; Score: Ronnie Raphael
- Production company: Neyyar Films
- Release date: 29 August 2024
- Country: India
- Language: Malayalam

Virunnu (lit. Feast) is a 2024 Indian Malayalam-language action drama film directed by Kannan Thamarakkulam and written by Dinesh Pallath. The film stars Arjun Sarja and Nikki Galrani in lead roles, with Mukesh, Sona Nair, Aju Varghese, Baiju Santhosh, Hareesh Peradi, Dharmajan Bolgatty, and Gireesh Neyyar portraying supporting roles.

The film is entirely in Malayalam, except for Arjun Sarja's portions which were shot in Tamil. The Tamil version was released under the title Virundhu.

== Plot ==
The movie opens with the mysterious death of a businessman named John Kalathil. As the investigation into John's death unfolds, his wife Elizabeth also meets a tragic end in a car accident. In her final moments, Elizabeth is seen by an auto-driver Hemanth and she implores him to meet a man named Balan and tell him that "it all ends at Seven Hills." However, Hemanth is discouraged from acting on it by his friend Murali since its only a couple of hours to his sisters wedding in the morning, and the police could keep him occupied for ever.

Once his sister's wedding is concluded, he is again discouraged from even reporting to the police by his friend. By the time Hemanth musters the courage to meet Balan, John & Elizabeth's daughter Pearly is attacked at her home but saved in time by none other than her Balan Uncle who happens to be a close family friend. Not trusting the law and order department, he moves her to a secure hideout of his own.

When Hemanth finally reports Elizabeth's cryptic final words to Balan at his party office, the latter takes him to his hideout where he has secured Pearly for the time being, and together, they attempt to uncover the mystery. It turns out that Balan, though aged, is a hard core party cadre, with no hesitation to take matters into his hands if push comes to shove. What follows is a mishmash of events as Hemanth embarks on a quest to uncover the truth behind the deaths of John and Elizabeth.

When the police gets wind of their location, Balan sends Pearly with Hemanth to another location in a forest, but they are ambushed by the same group of goons who tried to attack Pearly at her home earlier. Almost taken, they are saved this time by the timely appearance of a mysterious stranger Devanarayanan who thrashes the goons, takes their leader captive and takes Hemanth and Pearly to his own secure guest house in the forest. When Pearly later finds a photo of a young Devanarayanan and her own mother Elizabeth in the house, she surmises that he must be the 'Deva' her mother had been talking to lately on the phone after John's death, and that he must have killed her father John to be with Elizabeth. She tries to stab Deva as he sleeps but an alert Deva catches her deftly and reveals that he is a friend, and that John Kalathil had earlier approached him, as he happens to be an independent business consultant and how Deva had saved their company from imminent ruin. After John's inexplicable death, he had been guiding Elizabeth over the phone to save the company from greedy directors, leading to them badmouthing the duo and even Pearly getting the bad impression. When he himself was attacked at home by a team of goons, Deva decided to delve into the case and solve the mystery.

Releasing the goon leader Deva had taken captive earlier as a ruse, they follow him to a grand building deep in the forest named the Seven Hills. It is revealed that the place is the headquarters of a group of Satan worshippers, and that their leader and the mastermind behind the whole mystery happens to be none other than John Kalathil's father and Pearly's grandfather David Abraham Kalathil, who had gone deranged on Satanic worship and has been arranging the murder of his own son and daughter-in-law, while the real prize always was Pearly herself, who supposedly was born on an occasion special to Satan. As Pearly is about to be sacrificed on the Satanic altar so David would gain supernatural powers, Deva, Balan, and Hemanth save the day thrashing everybody in place and subduing David.

== Cast ==
- Arjun Sarja as Devanarayanan, an Independent Business Consultant, who is the former lover of Elizabeth and later friend of both John and Elizabeth
- Nikki Galrani as Pearly
- Mukesh as John Abraham, Pearly's father
- Sona Nair as Elizabeth
- Aju Varghese as Praveen
- Baiju Santhosh as Balan Uncle
- Hareesh Peradi as David Kalathil, Pearly's grandfather
- Dharmajan Bolgatty as Murali
- Kochu Preman as Manoharan
- Gireesh Neyyar as Rajan
- Ajai Vasudev as Ponnan
- Sudheer Sukumaran as Binto

== Production ==
In April 2021, it was reported that Arjun Sarja would play the lead role in the film. The principal photography commenced on 3 May 2021, but was halted due to the COVID-19 pandemic. Filming resumed on 19 July 2021, and the second schedule began on 21 January 2022. The film was shot in Peermade, Thiruvananthapuram, Erattupetta and Thodupuzha. The cinematography was by Ravi Chandran and Pradeep Nair. The editing was handled by VT Sreejith.

== Soundtrack ==
The soundtrack consists of the songs composed by Ratheesh Vega and Saanand George Grace, while the background score was by Ronnie Raphael.

Track listing - Malayalam
No.	Title	Lyrics	Music	Singer(s)	Length
1.	"Kalyanapattu"	B. K. Harinarayanan	Ratheesh Vegha	Vineeth Sreenivasan	3:41
2.	"Nila Nilavithal"	Rafeeq Ahamed	Ratheesh Vegha	Gouri Lakshmi	4:17
3.	"Sakka Podu Podu"	Mohan Rajan	Saanand George Grace	Jagatheesh	2:30
Total length:					10:28

Track listing - Tamil
No.	Title	Lyrics	Music	Singer(s)	Length
1.	"Kottu Kottu Getti Melam"	B. K. Harinarayanan	Ratheesh Vegha	Rahul Nambiar, Anjali Warrier	3:43
2.	"Kana Kana Vizhiyoram"	Mohan Rajan	Ratheesh Vegha	Sharanya Srinivas	4:17
3.	"Kottu Kottu Getti Melam (Male version)"	B. K. Harinarayanan	Ratheesh Vegha	Rahul Nambiar	3:43
4.	"Sakka Podu Podu"	Mohan Rajan	Saanand George Grace	Jagatheesh	2:30
Total length:					14:13

== Release ==
The film was originally scheduled for release on 23 August 2024, but was delayed. It subsequently released theatrically on 29 August 2024. It was released in OTT via Amazon Prime and Simply South (Tamil version).

== Reception ==
Virunnu received generally negative reviews by critics. Abishek Balaji of Cinema Express rated the film two out of five stars and wrote that "Arjun has a solid screen presence, and there are some gripping scenes. But the overdose of background music and quick cutaways gets exhausting". Harshini SV of The Times of India rated the film one-and-a-half out of five stars and wrote that "Unlike the usual pattern in Tamil cinema, Virundhu offers multiple twists and a cleverly designed climax, keeping you hooked throughout the second half. The actual surprises, including the story of a cult group, catch you off-guard. Their motives and routines are also interestingly captured and it’s here you get a glimpse of what the film could’ve been with a better-written screenplay".
