= David & Goliath (2013 film) =

- Directed by: Rajeev Nath
- Written by: Anoop Menon
- Produced by: Sudeep Karakkat; M. C. Arun
- Starring: Jayasurya; Anoop Menon; Soumya
- Cinematography: Jithu Damodar
- Edited by: Xian
- Music by: Ratheesh Vegha
- Production companies: Sal Roza Motion Pictures; Line of Colours
- Distributed by: Murali Films
- Release date: 22 February 2013
- Running time: 112 minutes
- Country: India
- Language: Malayalam

David & Goliath is a 2013 Indian Malayalam-language drama film written by Anoop Menon and directed by Rajeev Nath. It stars Jayasurya, Anoop Menon, Soumya and Anumol in the lead roles. The film is produced by Sudeep Karat under the banner of Sal Roza Motion Pictures and Line of Colors and features music composed by Ratheesh Vegha, and cinematography is handled by Jithu Damodar and is edited by Sian.

In the Bible, the story of David and Goliath is about how the meek and innocent David kills the Philistine giant Goliath through a slingshot in the battle of Philistine and Israel. The film is a modern interpretation of the story, which deals with the concept of the strong and weak, and has Jayasurya playing David while Anoop Menon appears as Sunny. The film's story revolves around a church and the few characters who are closely associated with it. The biblical characters are given modern day interpretations and show how in every David there resides a strong and courageous Goliath who can win even a difficult battle. The movie was successful at box office.

== Plot ==
David is an orphan who is abandoned outside an isolated church on a tea plantation. He is rescued by Father Gerald and grows up to be a socially awkward but smart and pious boy under the tutelage of the priest. But David has a problem: he gets nervous and gets nose bleeds whenever he is surrounded by people. He has to drop out of school because of this but he is a genius and displays an astounding expertise when it comes to creating machines. After the death of Father Gerald David becomes alone in the world. Sunny who is a planter and a failed businessman discovers one of David's creations, and reaps a fortune with that. The story of weak and strong starts here.

== Cast ==
- Jayasurya as David
  - Master Dhananjay as David (childhood)
- Anoop Menon as Sunny Ulahannan
- P. Balachandran as Father Gerald
- Soumya as Sharon
- Anumol as Deepa
- Indrans as Kapyar Autha
- Lena as Jainamma
- Sukumari as Kurisamma
- Vijesh Gopi as Saravanan
- Aji John as Channel Reporter
- Baby Minsara as Sharon (Childhood)
- Joju George
- Arun as Sunny's friend

== Production ==
=== Development ===
David & Goliath reunited Anoop Menon and Jayasurya. Director Rajeev Nath recalled that "The story idea for 'David & Goliath' came when Jayasurya and I were sitting in my flat thinking what next to do after Trivandrum Lodge". The film deals with the idea of success and failure from the micro-level. If there was no concept of success and failure, then there would have been no ego and no war between the countries that we see today". The associate director of this film was Shibu Gangadharan and the assistant directors were Krishna Kumar, Binal Kottacadu, Arunlal Pillai, and Soumya (who also played the heroine).

=== Casting ===
Jayasurya was chosen to play the lead role of the innocent young countryside man David, who is capable of many things and has strong love in his heart. Anoop Menon penned the screenplay as well as performing the role of Goliath. Both Nazriya Nazim and Asif Ali were considered for roles in the film, but director and actress Soumya debuted as the heroine with this film, playing the character of a village belle who is the lover of Jayasurya's character David. Soumya had already directed and acted in several short films and this is her first time in a feature film. Anumol was chosen to play the supporting heroine role opposite Anoop Menon's character Sunny. P. Balachandran plays another character in the film after his debut in acting by the film Trivandrum Lodge, which was also scripted by Anoop Menon and starred Jayasurya and Anoop Menon as well. Sukumari also works second time with Anoop Menon-Jayasurya duo after Trivandrum Lodge as well. Indrans and Lena were chosen to play supporting roles in the movie. Lena was chosen to play a full-time drunk named Jaynamma, who is a worker in a tea estate in the high range.

=== Filming ===
The shoot of the film started on 23 September 2012. The production controller is Clinton Perreira, while the production executive is Sunil Jose. Jithu Damodar is Director of Photography in the film. The scenic backdrop of Vagamon was the main location.

== Reception ==
Paresh C Palicha of Rediff.com rated the film 2 out of 5 stars and wrote, "David & Goliath, in the final analysis, turns out to be a disappointment because in the end it seems to be just all about lighting up a bulb". Aswin J Kumar of The Times of India rated the film 2.5 out of 5 stars and wrote, "There is a feeble attempt to glorify Christian virtues of forgiveness and brotherhood. All this may have worked had there been a more impersonal depiction of certain characters".
