= Aham (film) =

- Theatrical release poster
- Directed by: Rajeevnath
- Screenplay by: Venu Nagavally
- Story by: Rajeevnath
- Produced by: P. K. R. Pillai
- Starring: Mohanlal; Urvasi; Ramya Krishna
- Cinematography: Santhosh Sivan; Venu
- Edited by: Ravi
- Music by: Raveendran
- Production company: Sreesankara Arts
- Distributed by: Shirdi Sai Release
- Release date: 1 May 1992
- Running time: 119 minutes
- Country: India
- Language: Malayalam
- Budget: ₹46 lakhs

Aham (transl. Self) is a 1992 Indian Malayalam-language drama film directed by Rajeevnath and written by Venu Nagavally from a story by Rajeevnath. The film stars Mohanlal, Urvasi, and Ramya Krishna. The soundtrack was composed by Raveendran and cinematography was handled by Santhosh Sivan and Venu. It was produced on ₹46 lakhs.

== Plot ==
The film revolves around Siddharthan, a bank manager, a man who has different outlook to life. He wants to be perfect in every thing that he does and even wants people around him to accept the way he thinks. He lacks love from his parents and develops hatred towards his father, a judge, who was responsible for the death of their servant and his family, who were the only friends of Siddharthan. Growing up Siddharthan becomes very narrow minded and looks at every one else's behavior with doubt and prejudice. He doubts the relationship between his wife Renjini and her friend Capt. Mahendran to the extent that he warns Mahendran from ever entering his house to meet Renjini. Renjini is not able to adjust with his crazy lifestyle. She wants to become self-reliant but this creates suspicion in Siddharthan's mind. On his birthday when Renjini out of her earnings from a part-time job (that Siddarth is unaware of) buys him a tie, he doubts her of infidelity and in a resulting argument and in the subsequent struggle Ranjini falls down the stairs and goes into coma and later on she dies. Siddhartha loses his mental balance. Later he ends up in a mental asylum, where he writes a diary recounting and recollecting the deeds that he has done and repents for it. Meanwhile, a researcher from America Miriyana Varghese develops a friendship with Siddharthan and makes him her subject for her research. Siddharthan unaware of her motives, develops feelings for her which gets shattered when he finds out about the research. Ultimately, Siddharthan who thinks that the only way to reconcile with his dead wife and to be loved is to commit suicide and he kills himself.

== Cast ==
- Mohanlal as Sidharthan
- Urvasi as Renjini Pilla
- Ramya Krishna as Mariyana Varghese
- Vaishnavi as Vimala Mathews
- Neena Gupta as Mother Nobble
- Suresh Gopi as Capt. Mahedran (cameo)
- Nedumudi Venu as Keshavan Pilla
- Jagathy Sreekumar as M.P Kidappadam ( M.P.K)
- Maniyanpilla Raju as Marfee Markose
- Adoor Pankajam as Mariyamma
- Karamana Janardanan Nair as Kutti Sahib
- Vijayaraghavan as Pathrose
- Poojappura Ravi as Warrier
- Kunchan as Jacob Fernadez
- Rajeev Nath as Dr.Menon
- Vasudevan Paravattom as Sidharthan's father (cameo)
- Swapna Ravi as Usha
- Usharani as Achamma Tharakan
- K.P.A.C. Sunny as Tharakan
- M. G. Soman as K.P Pilla
- Rajeev Rangan as Mathews (Cameo Appearance)
- T. P. Madhavan as Cameo Appearance
- Nandu as Cameo Appearance
- Jagannathan as Cameo Appearance

== Soundtrack ==
Aham

Soundtrack album by Raveendran
- Released: 25 September 1992
- Recorded: 1992
- Genre: Popular music
- Length: 21:00
- Language: Malayalam
- Label: Ranjini Cassettes
- Producer: Rajeevnath

Raveendran chronology
Vishnulokam (1992)	Aham (1992)	Champakulam Thachan (1992)

Raveendran composed the film's original soundtrack, the lyrics were written by Kavalam Narayana Panicker and Konniyoor Bhas. All songs was sung by K. J. Yesudas. The soundtrack which consists of 5 songs was released by the music label Ranjini Cassettes on 25 September 1992.

Aham (Original Motion Picture Soundtrack)
No.	Title	Artist(s)	Length
1.	"Aadhi Madhya"	K. J. Yesudas	4:29
2.	"Muhurtham"	K. J. Yesudas	4:12
3.	"Nanni Arodu Njan"	K. J. Yesudas	3:36
4.	"Nirangale"	K. J. Yesudas	4:36
5.	"Urangunna"	K. J. Yesudas	4:07
Total length:			20:00

== Accolades ==
Kerala State Film Awards

- Best Cinematography - Santhosh Sivan, Venu
- Best Processing Lab - Vijaya Colour Lab
