= Revaa =

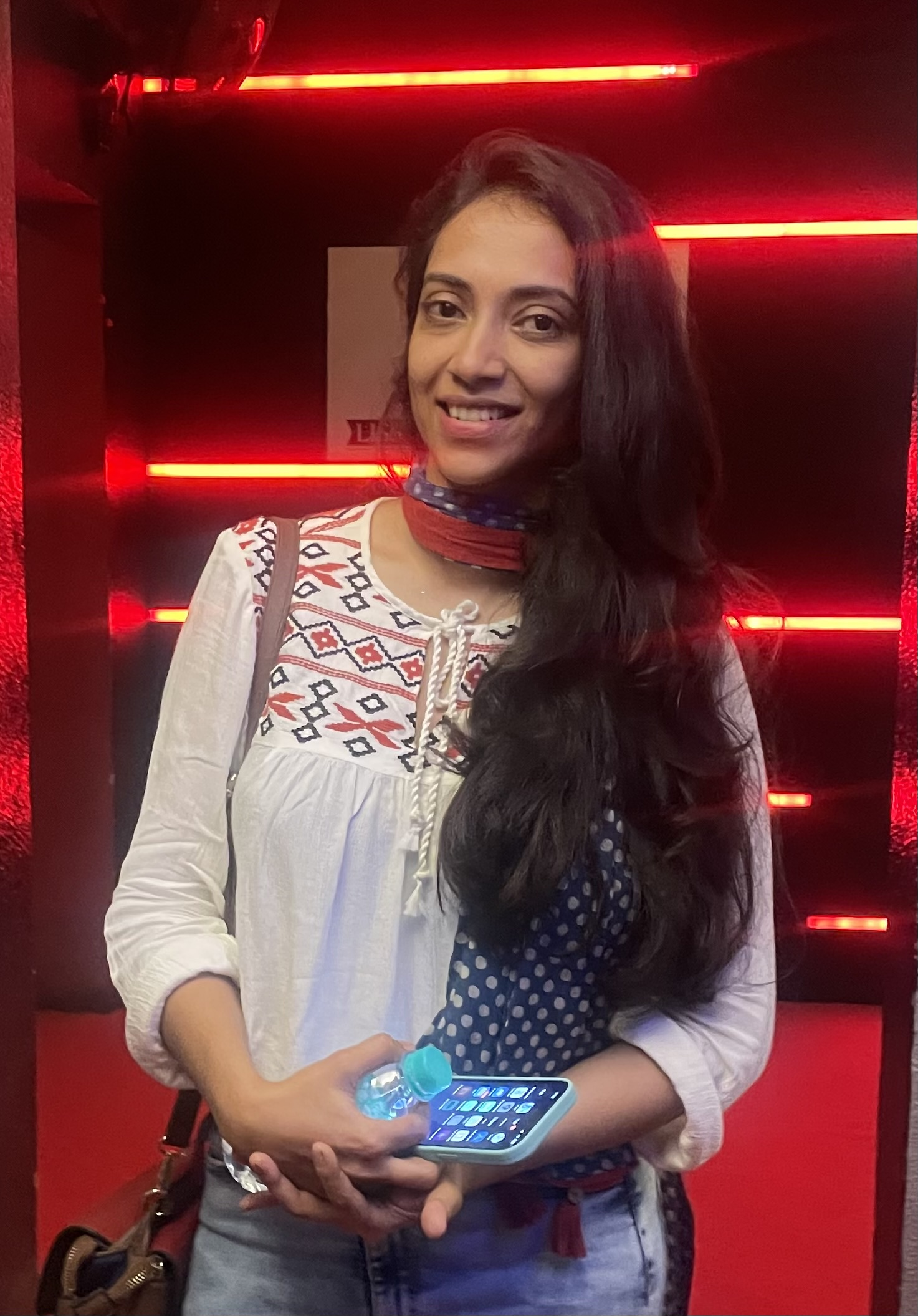

Background information
- Born: June 20, 1987 (age 39); Palakkad, Kerala
- Occupation: Music composer
- Instruments: Piano; Keyboard; Violin
- Years active: 2018 – present

Revaa (born June 20, 1987) is an Indian music director who works in Tamil cinema. Her Tamil film debut was Mughizh starring Vijay Sethupathi. Revaa gained popularity with her noticeable work in Ayali, a streaming web series released in 2023.

== Career ==
Revaa started her music career in advertising and media in 2014. Revaa made her Malayalam and Marathi debut in 2019. Her Tamil debut Mughizh was released in 2021. She composed the background score for the film Kalvan (2024) and the upcoming film Aasai, directed by Shiv Mohaa.

== Discography ==
Year	Title	Language	Notes
2018	Mangalyam Thanthunanena	Mayalayam	1 song - Melle Mulle
2019	College Diary	Marathi	2 songs - He Mann Maze, Korangu Paattu
2021	Mughizh	Tamil	
2023	Ayali	Tamil	
2024	Kalvan	Tamil	Background score
2024	Aindham Vedham	Tamil	Television series
2024	Amigo †	Tamil	Background score
2024	Aasai †	Tamil	
