= Soumya Sadanandan =

Indian Filmmaker

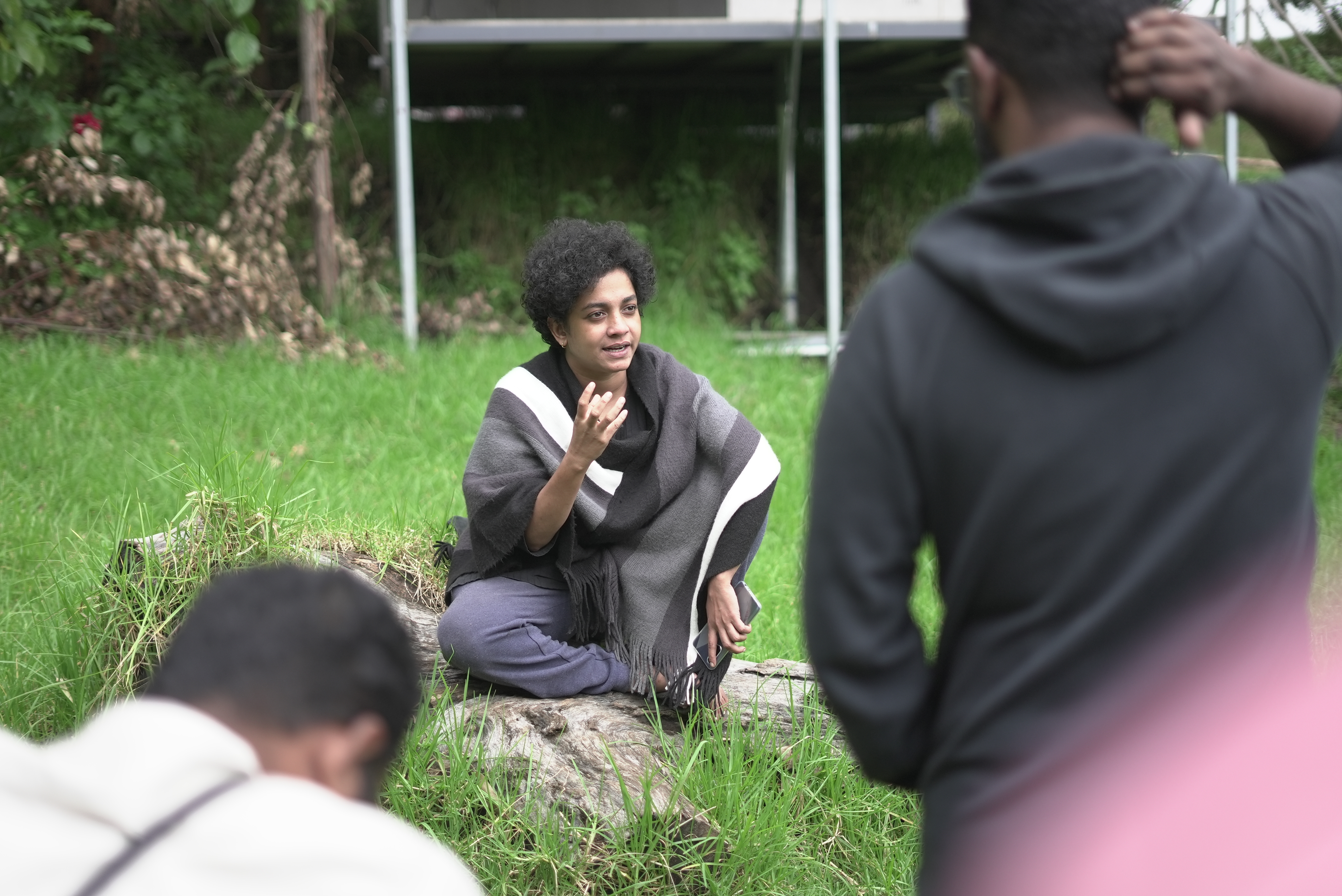
- Born: Alappuzha, Kerala, India
- Other name: Sou Sadanandan
- Occupation: Filmmaker
- Years active: 2012–present

Soumya Sadanandan is an Indian filmmaker who works in Malayalam Film Industry. She was the Television Host of a popular film based show on Kappa TV, called 'Film Lounge' (2013–2017). She was a member of the Jury and Selection Committee of IFFK 2017 and IDSFFK 2021. She is a Film Educator. She has organized online and offline filmmaking workshops for film aspirants over the past decade.

== Early life ==
She was born at Mepallikutti, Alappuzha, Kerala. She completed her schooling from Kendriya Vidyalaya Pattom and secured a degree in Electrical and Electronics Engineering from College Of Engineering Thiruvananthapuram, Kerala.

== Filmography ==
As Director / Producer

Year	Title	Category	Credit	Awards
2025	Flavors of India Cocoa	Documentary	Director, Post-Production Coordinator	
2024	Fairgreen Organic Manure	Documentary	Camera, Editor, Director	
2023	Kshatham	Malayalam Short Film	Mentor, Producer	
2022	Theetta	Malayalam Short Film	Mentor, Producer	
2021	Kali - A divine Comedy	Malayalam Short Film	Screenplay, Direction	
2020	Rooh	Malayalam Nano Film	Director, Producer	
2018	Mangalyam Thanthunanena	Malayalam Feature Film	Director	
2017	Rabbit Hole	Short Film	Director	2018 Best cinematography, Best Sound Design and Special Mention for Screenplay at Eastern Global Short film festival 2018
2017	New World Cente : Smyrna Fellowship Trust : Ooty	Documentary	Narrator, Writer, Director, Producer	
2016	Chembai: My discovery of a legend	Documentary	Director, Narrator, Producer	2017 Special Jury Award at 64th National Film Awards 2016 Signs Film Festival, Kerala 2016 Best Documentary at Allahabad International film festival
2016	C/O Saira Banu	Malayalam Feature Film	Language Coach	
2016	The Boy	Malayalam Short Film	Producer	
2015	Olappeeppi	Malayalam Feature Film	Chief Associate Director	
2013	David and Golaith	Malayalam Feature Film	Assistant Director / Lead Artist	
2013	Inam	Tamil Feature Film	Assistant Director / Supporting Artist	
2013	Aashanum Ashathiyum	Malayalam Web Series	Director, Producer	
2012	Jawan of Vellimala	Malayalam Feature Film	Assistant Director	
2012	Mystique Encounter	Malayalam Short Film	Director, Writer	
2012	Cinema Company	Malayalam Feature Film	Assistant Director / Junior Artist	

As Artist

Year	Title	Role	Notes	Category	Director
2019	Bolivia	Neethu	Protagonist	Feature Film	Faizal
2015	Mili	Mili's Friend	Supporting Artist	Feature Film	Rajesh Pillai
2014	Ormayundo Ee Mukham	Neethu	Supporting Artist	Feature Film	Anvar Sadik
2013	David and Goliath	Sharon	Lead Artist	Feature Film	Rajeevnath
2013	Ceylon	Aisha	Supporting Artist	Feature Film	Santosh Sivan
2012	Cinema Company	Journalist	Junior Artist	Feature Film	Mamas K Chandran
2012	An Old Hag Story	Protagonist	Artist	Short Film	Gowtham Lenin
2012	Mystique Encounter	Protagonist	Artist	Short Film	Soumya Sadanandan

== Awards ==
- 2016 Chembai: My discovery of a legend - Special Jury Award for Best Documentary at the 64th National Film Awards.
- 2016 Chembai : My discovery of a legend - Best Documentary at Allahabad International film festival.
