= Poottu =

- Directed by: Rajeevnath
- Screenplay by: Ratheesh Menon
- Based on: Koodaram- short story by U. K. Kumaran
- Produced by: Chaya Films
- Starring: Joemon Kattungal; Albert Alex; Gopan Mavelikara; Vineetha; Sanju Philips; Raju Thomas; Shruthi; Dipu Chacko
- Cinematography: Anil Eswar
- Edited by: Praveen Mangalath
- Music by: Sateesh Ramachandran
- Production company: KSFDC
- Release date: 2017
- Language: Malayalam

Poottu (English: The Lock) is a Malayalam movie directed by Rajeevnath. The story is based on U. K. Kumaran’s short story, Koodaram and depicts the life in an apartment complex when the lock system suddenly malfunctions. The movie had its world premiere in Dubai on Saturday, 28 January 2017.

Shibu Gangadharan is the associate director of this movie. The film, with around 30 Indian expatriate actors, was shot in Dubai and Fujeirah and was completed within 13 days. The movie launched its official trailer on 8 March 2017 and announced its theatrical release in April 2017. It was premiered on television on 3 September 2017.

== Cast ==
- Gopan Mavelikara as Shivan
- Albert Alex
- Sanju Philips as Kiran
- Vineetha
- Raju Thomas as Jerry
- Dipu Chacko as Peter
- Kris Iyer as Venu
- Shruthi
- Kuruvilla John
