= Kannan Thamarakkulam =

Indian film director

Kannan Thamarakkulamm
- Born: 11 May 1979 (age 47); Thamarakkulam, Alappuzha District, Kerala, India
- Other name: Thamara Kannan (Tamil)
- Occupations: Film Director, Writer, Lyricist, Producer
- Years active: 1997–present
- Spouse: Vishnu Prabha (m. 2020)
- Children: 1

Kannan Thamarakkulam is an Indian film director who works in Malayalam and Tamil films.

== Personal life ==
Thamarakkulam married Vishnu Prabha in a small ceremony at Chettikulangara in December 2020.

== Career ==
He joined the cinema industry as an assistant director. He has worked as an assistant and associate in a lot of TV serials and movies. He made his first solo debut as a director in a TV Series, titled, Minnaram.

In 2014, he directed his debut as director in Tamil movie Sooraiyadal. His first direction venture in Malayalam was Thinkal Muthal Velli Vare (2015) with Jayaram. His third release was big budget film Aadupuliyattam in 2016. The horror genre received good response from the audiences and the critics. The next titled was the comedy, Achayans (2017). In 2018, Kannan Thamarakkulam has opted for Chanakya Thanthram (2018) an approach much similar to the second half of his previous film Achayans. He has given due importance to Unni Mukundan and he has portrayed his character with the required mass appeal and style quotient. In 2019, Kannan directs Jayaram in the comedy drama, Pattabhiraman. In 2021, he had two thriller releases Vidhi: The Verdict and Udumbu. Next, the political drama Varaal (2022) was released. In 2024, Virunnu also released in Tamil as Virundhu starring Arjun Sarja was a disappointment.

== Filmography ==
Year	Title	Language	Notes	Ref
2014	Sooraiyadal	Tamil	Debut film	
2015	Thinkal Muthal Velli Vare	Malayalam		
2016	Aadupuliyattam	Malayalam		
2017	Achayans	Malayalam		
2018	Chanakya Thanthram	Malayalam		
2019	Pattabhiraman	Malayalam		
2021	Vidhi: The Verdict	Malayalam		
2021	Udumbu	Malayalam		
2022	Varaal	Malayalam		
2024	Virunnu / Virundhu	Malayalam, Tamil		

== Television ==
Year	Film	Channel	Notes
2006	Minnaram	Asianet	
2006	Midhunam	Asianet	
2007	Ammakkayi	Surya TV	
2008-2009	Ammathottil	Asianet	
2009	Akkare Ikkare	Asianet	
2009-2011	Maharani	Vijay TV	Tamil serial
2011-2013	Amma	Asianet	
2011-2013	Aval	Vijay TV	Tamil serial
2019	Sabarimala Swami Ayyapan	Asianet	
2019	Pournami Thinkal	Asianet	
2021-2022	Kaliveedu	Surya TV	
2024	Janakiyudeyum Abhiyudeyum Veedu	Asianet	
2026	Cousins and Kalyanams	JioHotstar	Web series
