= Chanakya Thanthram =

2018 film directed by Kannan Thamarakkulam

- Poster
- Directed by: Kannan Thamarakulam
- Written by: Dinesh Pallath
- Based on: Thegidi (2014) by P. Ramesh
- Produced by: Muhammad Faizel
- Starring: Unni Mukundan; Anoop Menon; Shivada Nair; Shruti Ramachandran
- Cinematography: Pradeep Nair
- Music by: Shaan Rahman
- Production company: Miracle Productions
- Distributed by: Ullattil Visual Media
- Release date: 3 May 2018
- Running time: 136 minutes
- Country: India
- Language: Malayalam

Chanakya Thanthram is a 2018 Malayalam-language film produced by Miracle Productions. The film is directed by Kannan Thamarakkulam, and stars Unni Mukundan, Anoop Menon, Shruti Ramachandran and Shivada Nair in the lead roles along with Indrans, and Hareesh Perumanna. The music is composed by Shaan Rahman. The film is based on a story written by Dinesh Pallath. The movie is a remake of 2014 Tamil movie Thegidi.

== Plot ==
Arjun is an expert in criminology who is just out from college. He aspires to become a private detective and searches for available options. He receives an offer from a private agency in Kochi and accepts. He was asked to monitor and prepare whereabouts about a few subjects. He becomes overconfident as he solves some cases before his scheduled time. Meanwhile, he falls in love with an orphan named Andrea.

Soon, he learns that his earlier subjects were mysteriously murdered one by one. Tensions erupt when he becomes doubtful about the credibility of his employment agency when they ask him to keep track of Andrea. Later he understands that he has been trapped and tries to resolve it using his intelligence and with help from IPS Officer Iqbal who is investigating the murders.

== Cast ==
- Unni Mukundan as Arjun Ram Mohan
- Anoop Menon as Iqbal IPS
- Shruti Ramachandran as Andrea/Miya
- Shivada Nair as Irene
- Hareesh Perumanna as Avinash
- Muhemmed Faizel as Antony isaac samuel
- Niyaz Musaliyar as Gokul
- Thrissur Elsy as Nun
- Kalabhavan Haneef as Vishwan
- Jaise Jose as Police Officer
- Biju Pappan as Devarajan
- Vinaya Prasad as Adv. Arundathi
- Saikumar as Ram Mohan
- Sohan Seenulal as Vijay
- Sudheer as Adithyan
- Sampath Ram
- Tosh Christy - Cameo Appearance
- Shafique Rahiman - Cameo Appearance
- Indrans - Cameo Appearance
- Ramesh Pisharody - Cameo Appearance

== Soundtrack ==
The music department is a combination of music director Shaan Rahman along with lyricists Afsal Komath, Kaithapram D Namboothiri and Hari Narayanan.

- "Etho vazhitharayil"- Unni Mukundan, Tessa Chavara
- "Padaporuthana"-Shaan Rahman
- "Naadin Raajathiyo"-Sree Lakshmi
