= Trivandrum Lodge =

- Theatrical release poster
- Directed by: V. K. Prakash
- Written by: Anoop Menon
- Produced by: P. A. Sebastian
- Starring: Jayasurya; Anoop Menon; Honey Rose; Bhavana
- Cinematography: Pradeep Nair
- Edited by: Mahesh Narayanan
- Music by: Songs: M. Jayachandran; Background score: Bijibal
- Production company: Time Ads Entertainment
- Distributed by: Popcorn Entertainments
- Release date: 21 September 2012
- Country: India
- Language: Malayalam

Trivandrum Lodge is a 2012 Indian Malayalam-language drama film directed by V. K. Prakash, written by Anoop Menon, and produced by P. A. Sebastian. The film stars Jayasurya, Anoop Menon, and Honey Rose, and features P. Balachandran and P. Jayachandran in supporting roles. Its music is composed by M. Jayachandran and the cinematography is handled by Pradeep Nair. The film is edited by Mahesh Narayanan.

The film was released in theatres on 20 September. It received mixed to positive reviews from critics. It was a commercial success at the box office.

== Plot ==
Trivandrum Lodge, situated in Kochi, and its inmates form the backdrop of the film. Abdu is a man who does odd jobs for a living, including being a masseur at a spa and the driver of a wealthy businessman. He is also obsessed with sex, being sex-starved. Shibu Vellayani is a cinema reporter who works with a not-so-well-known film magazine and persuades women to sleep with him for roles in films. Kora is a retired clerk from the secretariat who boasts about having had sex with 999 women in his life and who wishes to have a policewoman as his 1000th conquest. Satheeshan wants to be an actor. Shibu promises to help him and has even given Satheeshan a new name, Sagar. Arthur Relton and Peggy Aunty are the oldest inmates. Relton teaches piano and lives in the world of music while Peggy Aunty runs a canteen inside the lodge.

The lodge's owner is Ravisankar, a rich widower with a son, Arjun. Ravisankar's mother was into many rich men and all his wealth comes from her earnings. This caused Ravisankar's father Narayanan to move away from the family years before. He runs a small hotel, away from his son's world.

Dhwani makes her entry into this world of Ravi, Narayanan, and all the inmates of Trivandrum Lodge. She is divorced, wants to be free, eat good food, and as she herself says, "fornicate with abandon". Dhwani comes to stay at Trivandrum Lodge, aiming to write a novel with Kochi as the backdrop. Her intentions are not so honourable, and the sexually repressed souls of Trivandrum lodge go into a tizzy. Dhwani and Abdu have a deep affectionate love when she pays Abdu to act as her lover in a hotel room to stop her husband from asking her to take him back.

The film also discusses in detail the adolescent romance between Arjun and his classmate Amala, and the unconditional romance between Ravisankar and his wife, Malavika, who is dead. Dhwani is fascinated by his ability to stay true to one woman even after she passes away and the broken love story of Relton and Peggy.

== Cast ==
- Jayasurya as Abdu, a poor man without self-confidence who does any job for a living
- Anoop Menon as Ravisankar, owner of the Trivandrum Lodge
- Honey Rose as Dhwani Nambiar, a writer
- P. Balachandran as Korah, an inmate in the lodge
- Saiju Kurup as Shibu Vellayini, a local film magazine editor
- Bhavana as Malavika, Ravisankar's wife
- Dhananjay as Arjun, Ravisankar's son
- Nayanthara Chakravarthy as Amala, Arjun's classmate and his love interest
- Janardhanan as Arthur Gopal Relton, a pianist
- Sukumari as Peggy, an inmate in the lodge
- Thesni Khan as Kanyaka Menon, a prostitute
- Arun as Satheesan, an inmate in the lodge
- Jayachandran as Narayanan Nair, Ravisankar's father
- Devi Ajith as Zarina, a close friend of Dhwani
- Joju George as Althas, Zarina's husband, less educated but a rich wholesale fish trader
- Kochu Preman as Sadanandan
- Krishna Praba as Roslin
- Nandu as Antony, School teacher
- Nikhil as Vivek, Dhwani's husband
- Ponnamma Babu as Nancy Mathew, the principal of Arjun's school
- Babu Namboothiri as Thangal (cameo), a professional pimp; he reprises the same role from Thoovanathumbikal
- V. K. Prakash (cameo) as a drunken guest

== Production ==
"The film revolves around the lives of a group of people who stay in the lodge. The lodge is just a metaphor for the happenings in the film, which won't have a conventional beginning, middle and end... It will be a tale of love, lust and longing. Each character evolves as the film progresses, from situation to situation."

— V. K. Prakash, about the film

=== Development ===
After the success of Beautiful, director V. K. Prakash wanted to meet the audience with another feel-good movie. Trivandrum Lodge brings together the key names behind Beautiful once again. While Anoop Menon was in charge of the scripts and was to play a pivotal role, Jayasurya came up in the lead role. Trivandrum Lodge combines elements of off-color humor. It follows the lives of the residents in a lodge and their relationships. According to the director, "it is a tale of love, lust and longing set in a lodge."

=== Casting ===
Jayasurya was chosen to play the character without further remarks. Initially, Padmapriya was chosen to play the female lead. She opted out after some changes in the script because she believed there was very limited scope for her to perform. Rumours said that the role was later given to Meghana Raj, but it was actually offered to Honey Rose who came through with a different character as Dhwani in the film. The film marked a comeback of sorts for veteran singer Jayachandran who had previously acted in 80s films such as Nakhakshathangal and Lekhayude Maranam Oru Flashback. Writer P. Balachandran and singer Nikhil also appear in major supporting roles. Bhavana was cast to play a small cameo role as the wife of Anoop Menon's character, and the actress agreed to do it readily. Devi Ajith was cast after a big break to play Zarina, a close friend of Dhwani. Thesni Khan plays Kanyaka, a role she herself enacted in V. K. Prakash's 2011 film Beautiful. Babu Namboothiri plays Thangal, a professional pimp, reprising the famous role he played in Padmarajan's cult classic Thoovanathumbikal, which was acclaimed by viewers.

=== Filming ===
The film began its shoot and held its pooja or launch on 22 April 2012 in Fort Kochi. The other locations are Mattancherry and Thiruvananthapuram. The cinematography was done by Pradeep Narayanan to mark his first in Malayalam cinema, while Aravind operated the helicam. It was the first ever film to have scenes shot by the helicam, which is a mix of the two: a remote-controlled mini-helicopter captures aerial shots with the help of a video camera.

== Critical reception ==
The film opened to mixed to positive responses from critics. Sujit Chandra Kumar stated in his review for Deccan Chronicle: "While the director-scriptwriter duo succeeds in creating lively and well-developed characters, the plot fails to be gripping as it enters the most dramatic phase." Rating the film, the critic was all praise for the film's cinematography, music and the lead performances. Unni R. Nair of Kerala9.com rated the film and concluded his review calling the film, "Different, bold, well-scripted, well-directed and with good performances." Sify.com gave a verdict of "below average" and went on to tell "A disturbingly offensive film, which frequently crosses every limit of decency under the guise of bold experiments". Paresh C. Palicha of Rediff.com rated the film and said, "Trivandrum Lodge is a frank retelling of people's cravings and desires and if not entirely successful, it does have something going for it." Aswin J. Kumar of The Times of India rated the film and concluded his review saying, "Trivandrum Lodge commands interest not because it displays bluntness with regard to love and lust, but remains honest in its narrative." Nowrunning.com and Indiaglitz.com also gave the film average reviews.

== Box office ==
The film collected US$1,887 from the UK box office.

== Awards ==
2nd South Indian International Movie Awards

- SIIMA Award for Best Actress in a Supporting Role – Thesni Khan

Asiavision Movie Awards 2012

- Second Best Actor – Jayasurya
- Trendsetter of the Year – Anoop Menon
- Popular Media awards – Trivanrum Lodge
- Master Dhananjay – Best Child Artist Asianet film award 2013
- Master Dhananjay – Best Child Artist Amritha TV award 2013

== Soundtrack ==
Trivandrum Lodge

Soundtrack album by M. Jayachandran
- Released: 5 September 2012
- Recorded: 2012
- Genre: Feature film soundtrack
- Language: Malayalam

M. Jayachandran chronology
'Chattakaari' (2012)	Trivandrum Lodge (2012)	916 (2012)

The film's soundtrack features songs composed by M. Jayachandran. The audio release of the film was held on 5 September 2012. All the lead actors, including Jayasurya, Honey Rose, Anoop Menon, and other actors, such as Dulquer Salmaan, Babu Antony, Aju Varghese, Bhagath Manuel, Gauthami Nair, as well as director Joshi attended the function and released the audio. The background score is composed by Bijibal.

All music is composed by M. Jayachandran.

No.	Title	Lyrics	Singers	Length
1.	"Kanninullil Nee Kanmani"	Rajeev Nair	Najim Arshad
2.	"Kilikal Parannatho"	Rafeeq Ahammed	Rajesh Krishnan
3.	"Theyyaram"	Rajeev Nair	M. Jayachandran, Suchitra
