= Namukku Parkkan =

- Film poster
- Directed by: Aji John
- Screenplay by: Jayan-Sunoj
- Produced by: Joy Thomas Sakthikulangara
- Starring: Anoop Menon; Meghna Raj; Jayasurya
- Narrated by: Mohanlal
- Cinematography: S.B.Prijith
- Edited by: Shamjith
- Music by: Ratheesh Vegha
- Distributed by: Jithin Arts
- Release date: 29 June 2012
- Country: India
- Language: Malayalam

Namukku Parkkan is a 2012 Malayalam film directed by Aji John, starring Anoop Menon and Meghna Raj in the lead roles. Jayasurya makes a pivotal guest appearance while Mohanlal makes a vocal appearance in the film.

== Plot ==
Namukku Parkkan reflects the realities of a middle-class Malayali family. Rajeev is a veterinary surgeon and his wife, Renuka, is a primary school teacher. They have two school-going daughters. They lead a happy and contended life and dream of owning a house that is beyond their means. They live in a small rented house and don't have a proper bathroom. One day, somebody peeps in when Renuka is bathing. They have plans for their ideal house, a house merging with nature, with lots of trees and a lovely garden and cattle roaming the compound. All others in their family own houses.

Rajeev is served with a note to vacate the house. He asks for some grace period till he finds a new house. An unexpected incident in his life makes it inevitable for him to build a house. He sets out on a journey to own a house and the realities he encounters in his journey form the rest of the story. C.I. Velu Nagarajan, a Karnataka police officer residing in Kerala, "helps" Rajeev and the rest of the story is the other incidents he faces.

== Cast ==
- Anoop Menon as Dr. Rajeev, a veterinary doctor who dreams highly of establishing a house for his loving family.
- Meghana Raj as Renuka Rajeev
- Jayasurya as CI Velu Nagarajan, Karnataka police officer (Guest Appearance)
- Mohanlal in a special voice-over appearance
- Janardhanan as Krishnan Ammavan
- Ashokan as K.K
- Devan as Varghese
- Kalabhavan Shajon as Mohanan
- Tini Tom as Balan
- Nandu
- Keerthana Sabarish
- Kritika Suresh
- Kaviyoor Ponnamma
- Sudheesh
- Mala Parvathi
- Geetha Vijayan
- Surabhi Lakshmi
- Munshi Venu
- Manikandan Pattambi
- Irshad as Aarif, Vigilance and Anti-corruption officer
- Sudheer Karamana
- Dinesh Prabhakar

== Reception ==
The music rights of the movie was obtained by Sathyam Audios for a record price close to ₹13 lakh, which is the highest price in Malayalam film industry, beating the previous record of Urumi. The movie as a whole was rated as average by Sify and Rediff reviews, with Rediff calling Anoop Menon's acting impressive.
