= Thanal (1978 film) =

- Directed by: Rajeevnath
- Written by: Rajeevnath; Dr. Sathyaseelan
- Screenplay by: Rajeevnath; Dr. Sathyaseelan
- Produced by: Vikraman Nair
- Starring: Adoor Bhasi; George Cheriyan; M. G. Soman; Rani Chandra
- Cinematography: Hemachandran
- Edited by: Ravi
- Music by: Jithin Shyam; Lyrics: Bichu Thirumala
- Production company: Sreevardhini Movie Makers
- Distributed by: Sreevardhini Movie Makers
- Release date: 24 December 1978
- Country: India
- Language: Malayalam

Thanal is a 1978 Indian Malayalam film, directed by Rajeevnath and produced by Vikraman Nair. The film stars Adoor Bhasi, George Cheriyan, M. G. Soman and Rani Chandra in the lead roles. The film has musical score by Jithin Shyam.

== Cast ==
- Adoor Bhasi
- George Cheriyan
- M. G. Soman
- Rani Chandra
- Ravi Menon
- Urmila

== Soundtrack ==
The music was composed by Jithin Shyam and the lyrics were written by Bichu Thirumala.

| No. | Song | Singers | Lyrics | Length (m:ss) |
|---|---|---|---|---|
| 1 | "Neelime Raagasindoora" | Vani Jairam | Bichu Thirumala | |
| 2 | "Prabhaathakiranam" | K. J. Yesudas | Bichu Thirumala | |
