= Beautiful (2011 film) =

- Directed by: V. K. Prakash
- Written by: Anoop Menon
- Produced by: Anand Kumar
- Starring: Jayasurya; Anoop Menon; Meghana Raj
- Cinematography: Jomon T. John
- Edited by: Mahesh Narayanan
- Music by: Ratheesh Vegha
- Production company: Yes Cinemas
- Distributed by: Yes Cinema Company; SRT Films; Dhanush Film Release
- Release date: 2 December 2011
- Running time: 108 minutes
- Country: India
- Language: Malayalam

Beautiful is a 2011 Indian Malayalam musical drama film written by Anoop Menon and directed by V. K. Prakash. The film stars Jayasurya, Anoop Menon, and Meghana Raj in the lead roles. The cinematography was by Jomon T. John and the music was composed by Ratheesh Vegha. It tells the story of the intense bonding of two friends, one quadriplegic and the other a musician. The film was released on 2 December 2011 to predominantly positive reviews and was a commercial success.

== Plot ==
Stephen Louis (Jayasurya) is a quadriplegic by birth who is immensely rich and believes in celebrating each moment of life. Despite being able to move only his neck, he loves to see beautiful things and aspires to celebrate life. He is assisted by his manager, Kamalu (Nandu), and his caretaker/driver, Karunan (Jayan), in a palatial house in Fort Kochi. As most of his relatives look to take advantage of his position, Stephen has kept all of them at bay, barring his cousin, Alex (Tini Tom), with whom he shares a good relationship.

John (Anoop Menon), a musician at a hotel, enters his life. John's nature is completely opposite to Stephen's. He is always worried about the future. Though poles apart in their attitudes, both enjoy a good friendship and try to make each other happy. During this, they realize that they were childhood friends. But with the arrival of a beautiful home nurse named Anjali (Meghana Raj), the attitudes of both friends towards their lives turn around.

The movie takes unexpected twists and turns and Anjali finally turns out to be Alex's mistress. Her real name is Annie. She had come to Stephen's residence undercover to poison him and to steal his wealth, with Alex, who had taken advantage of Stephen's openness with him. Unfortunately, John, who last visited Stephen before his poisoning, was blamed. After the police take John away, Alex's maid recognizes him and Anjali at the hospital where Stephen was dying of poisoning. The police let go of John and arrest Alex and Anjali. Surprisingly, Stephen survives and the friends live together happily.

== Cast ==
- Jayasurya as Stephen Louis, a quadriplegic.
  - Master Dhananjay as Young Stephen
- Anoop Menon as John, a musician.
- Meghana Raj as Anjali/Annie.
- Nandu as Kamalu
- Jayan Cherthala as Karunan, the driver.
- Tini Tom as Alex Malaickal
- Unni Menon as Peter
- P. Balachandran as Advocate Chandy
- Aparna Nair as Meera
- Ammu Venugopal as John's sister
- Praveena as Doctor
- Thesni Khan as Kanyaka
- Kishore Kumar as Biju, Alex's friend
- Kochu Preman as Kunjachan, Alex's uncle
- Ponnamma Babu as Nancy, Alex's aunt
- Joju George
- Pauly Valsan
- Lishoy as Louis Varghese, Stephen's father

== Production ==
Anoop Menon says the film was inspired by a real-life incident, the persisting memory of his quadriplegic childhood friend. The film started its shooting in Kochi in September 2011. The other main Location was in Munnar. The film was first titled "Ladies and Gentlemen" and was later changed to "Beautiful". It was produced by Anand Kumar under the banner of Yes Cinema.

Moral anarchy is the religion of the film's characters as they come out with volatile statements regarding marriage and loyalty. The casual reference to marital infidelity mouthed by Praveena's character in the film has irked many, but Anoop insists that he was just being realistic while penning the lines. "Even the films that come under the realistic tag hardly handle such subjects in an honest and transparent manner. We camouflage the reality with flashy elements so that you don't have to confront it openly. All my women characters are bold and I believe today's women are daring enough to discuss such stuff," he says.

The major portion of the movie was filmed in Bastion Bungalow in Fort Kochi, Kerala.

== Soundtrack ==
Beautiful

Soundtrack album by Ratheesh Vegha
- Released: 30 November 2011
- Recorded: 2011
- Genre: Feature film soundtrack
- Length: 23:16
- Language: Malayalam
- Label: Manorama Music
- Producer: Anand Kumar

The film's songs and background score were composed by Ratheesh Vegha and arranged by Gopi Sundar. Parvathy S. Nair from The Times of India stated, "Ratheesh Vega has done it again. After he pulled at the heart strings of music lovers with Cocktail a year ago, the music maker has repeated the magic with the songs and background score of director V K Prakash's Beautiful."

Beautiful was Anoop Menon's debut work as a lyricist. Menon says his debut as a lyricist was quite accidental. "On the second day of the shooting of Beautiful, music director Ratheesh Vega, actor Jayasurya, and I were chilling out in Ratheesh's car, when he asked me to pen some lines to try out a tune he'd composed for the film. The result is Mazhaneer Thullikal...," says the actor.

All lyrics are written by Anoop Menon; all music is composed by Ratheesh Vegha.

No.	Title	Artist(s)	Length
1.	"Mazhaneer Thullikal"	Unni Menon
2.	"Moovanthiyaay"	Vijay Yesudas
3.	"Ninviral Thumbil"	Gayatri Asokan
4.	"Raapoovinum"	Naveen Iyer, Balu Thankachan, Ajith, Thulasi Yatheendran
5.	"Mazhaneer Thullikal"	Thulasi Yatheendran
6.	"Raapoovinum" (Movie Edit)	Balu Thankachan, Pradeep Chandrakumar, Ajith, Thulasi Yatheendran

== Release ==
The film was originally scheduled to release on 18 November but was pushed back to 2 December due to a strike in the Malayalam film industry. It opened in 46 centres in Kerala on 2 December. The film had its international premiere at the first Ladakh International Film Festival (LIFF) where it was one of the two Malayalam features to be screened.

=== Reception ===
Paresh C. Palicha of Rediff.com rated the film 3.5/5 and stated: "V K Prakash-directed Beautiful can be considered a significant milestone in the revival of Malayalam cinema." Veeyen of Nowrunning.com gave the film 3/5 and said: "V K Prakash's 'Beautiful' is a compelling evocation of the human desire dynamics at work." the site added that "Beautiful wouldn't call it a masterpiece, but it is without doubt, one of the most absorbing Malayalam films that I have seen this year." A critic from IndiaGlitz.com rated the film 3.25/5 and wrote: "On the whole, 'Beautiful' has a fresh, honest and unpretentious air to it, which makes it appealing. Played with subtlety and intelligence by its stars, the movie is sure to end up in the lists of the bests of the year. Rightly advised for a must and decent watch."Sify.com gave a rating of 3.5/5 stating, "Beautiful has its own flaws and is far from perfect but needs to be appreciated for its courage to experiment. It could have been better and the jokes and the stance on morality may not find acceptance from all, but this one has sincerity written all over it. Now, the decision is all yours!" Kerala9.com gave a (3/5) and commented, "Beautiful is a cool clean film. Malayalam has got a director who understands what subtlety is."

=== Box office ===
The film was a commercial success.

== Awards ==
1st South Indian International Movie Awards

- SIIMA Award for Best Lyricist - Anoop Menon for "Mazhaneerthullikal"

Film Guidance Society of Kerala Film Awards

- Best Film
- Best Actor - Jayasurya
- Best Scriptwriter - Anoop Menon
- Best Music Director - Ratheesh Vegha
- Best Singer - Unni Menon

Ramu Kariat Memorial Cultural Forum Awards

- Special Jury Award - Jayasurya

Thikkurissi Foundation Awards (2012)

- Second Best Actor - Jayasurya
- Best Script - Anoop Menon
- Best Cinematography - Jomon T. John

Nana Film Awards

- Best Actor - Jayasurya

Amrita TV Film Awards

- Entertainer of the Year - Jayasurya
