= Anoop Menon =

Indian actor, director, screenwriter, lyricist (born 1976)

- Born: 3 August 1976 (age 50); Kozhikode, Kerala, India
- Education: Government Law College, Thiruvananthapuram
- Occupations: Actor; film director; screenwriter; lyricist
- Years active: 2002–present
- Spouse: Shema Alexander (m. 2014)
- Relatives: Shwetha Menon (cousin)

Anoop Menon (born 3 August 1976) is an Indian actor, director, screenwriter and lyricist. He worked in television before acting in Malayalam films.

Menon won the Kerala State Film Award for Best Supporting Actor and also the Filmfare Award for his performance as the fictional movie star Ajayachandran in Thirakkatha. He wrote the screenplay and dialogue for films such as Pakal Nakshatrangal (2008), Cocktail (2010), Beautiful (2011), Trivandrum Lodge (2012), and Hotel California (2013). He became a director with his debut King Fish Malayalam movie in 2021. He directed a film named Padma released in 2022.

== Early and personal life ==
Menon was born on 3 August 1976 in Kozhikode to Gangadharan Nair and Indira Menon. He grew up in Thiruvananthapuram. He studied at Christ Nagar School, Thiruvananthapuram. He then completed his Bachelor of Law (LL.B.) from the Government Law College, Thiruvananthapuram (1994-99), and was the first-rank holder from Kerala University.

While pursuing education at college, he used to do compering for Kairali TV and Surya TV. He met fellow filmmaker and screenplay writer Shankar Ramakrishnan during this time. Both of them were under the tutelage of renowned Malayalam movie director Ranjith.

Menon married Shema Alexander on 27 December 2014. Film actress Shwetha Menon is his cousin.

== Career ==
He began his acting career in Malayalam television serials. He was in two series on Asianet called Swapnam and Megham, the former one directed by K. K. Rajeev. Anoop made his debut as a screenwriter in Pakal Nakshatrangal with Mohanlal playing father and Anoop playing his son.

He also played main character in Thirakkatha by Ranjith, portraying different stages in the life of film star Ajay Chandran, loosely based on the personal life of Kamal Haasan. His co-stars were Priyamani and Prithviraj Sukumaran.

== Filmography ==
=== Actor ===
- All films are in Malayalam language unless otherwise noted.

List of Anoop Menon film acting credits
Year	Title	Role	Notes
2002	Kattuchembakam	Shivan	
2003	Ivar	Thomas IPS	
2005	Moksham	Radha Madhavan	
2007	Kaiyoppu	Doctor	
2007	Abraham & Lincoln	Philip Mathew	
2007	Pranayakalam	Doctor	
2007	Rock N' Roll	Vivek	
2008	Thirakkatha	Ajayachandran	
2008	Pakal Nakshatrangal	Aadhi	
2009	Anubhav	Aditya / Adi	Hindi film
2009	Currency	Mahesh Kesav	
2009	Ivar Vivahitharayal	Ajay Menon	
2009	Loudspeaker	Doctor	
2009	Patham Nilayile Theevandi	Dr. John Mathai	
2009	Kerala Cafe	Crime Investigator	
2010	Pramani	District Collector	
2010	Mummy & Me	Doctor	
2010	Neelambari	Thankaraj	
2010	Cocktail	Ravi Abraham	
2011	Traffic	Ajmal Nazar IPS	
2011	Lucky Jokers	Vishnu Sharman	
2011	Pranayam	Suresh Menon	
2011	Ven Shankhu Pol	Rajeevan	
2011	Beautiful	John	
2011	Athe Mazha Athe Veyil	Raghuraman	
2012	Ee Adutha Kaalathu	Tom Cherian IPS	
2012	Mullassery Madhavan Kutty Nemom P. O.	Madhavankutty	
2012	Josettante Hero	Sajan	
2012	Grandmaster	Dr. Jacob Varghese	
2012	Namukku Parkkan	Dr. Rajeev	
2012	Track	Mukundan	
2012	Hero	Aadithyan	
2012	Veendum Kannur	Jayakrishnan	
2012	Trivandrum Lodge	Ravisankar	
2012	Banking Hours 10 to 4	Sravan Varma	
2012	916	Dr. Harikrishnan	
2012	I Love Me	Ram Mohan	
2013	David & Goliath	Sunny	
2013	Hotel California	Prem Sagar	
2013	Buddy	Aadinarayanan	
2013	D Company	Akbar	
2013	Pattam Pole	Michael Rossario	
2013	Silence	Neil George IPS	
2014	1983	Vijay Menon	
2014	Angry Babies in Love	Jeevan	
2014	Vikramadithyan	Vasudeva Shenoy	
2014	The Dolphin	Nandan	
2014	Aamayum Muyalum	Lottery Ticket Examiner	
2015	She Taxi	Joe	
2015	Lavender	Interpol officer Raghavan Moorthy	
2015	Thinkal Muthal Velli Vare	Vijaya Anand	
2015	Kanal	Anantharaman	
2015	Female Unnikrishnan	Hari	
2016	Malgudi Days	Zephan Solomom	
2016	Pavada	Pavada Babu	
2016	Karinkunnam 6's	Aby	
2016	Pa Va	Varkey	
2016	10 Kalpanakal	Davis George	
2016	Kuttikalundu Sookshikkuka	Keshav	
2017	Munthirivallikal Thalirkkumbol	Venukuttan	
2017	Sarvopari Palakkaran	Jose Kaithaparambil Mani	
2017	Velipadinte Pusthakam	Vishwanathan aka Bullet Vishwan	
2018	Aami	Akbar Ali	
2018	Chanakya Thanthram	Raju Zakaria	
2018	B. Tech	Adv. Viswanath Iyyer	
2018	Ente Mezhuthiri Athazhangal	Sanjay	
2018	Neeli	Reni	
2019	Ganagandharvan	Yousaf	Cameo
2019	Kamala	Agasthy	
2020	Big Brother	Dr. Vishnu	
2021	Home	Superstar Vishal	
2021	Vidhi The Verdict	Bharath	
2022	Twenty One Gms	DySP Nanda Kishore	
2022	CBI 5: The Brain	I.G Unnithan IPS	
2022	Padma	Psychologist Ravi Shankar	
2022	Pathonpatham Noottandu	King of Travancore	
2022	King Fish	Bhaskara Varma	
2022	Varaal	David John	
2022	Kooman	Psychiatrist	
2023	Nalpathukaarante Irupathonnukaari	Thampi	
2023	Thimingala Vetta	Jayaraman	
2023	Nigoodam	Artist Shankar	
2023	Phoenix	Fr. Francis	
2023	Ohh...Cinderella		
2024	Abraham Ozler	Dr. Satheesh Madhavan	
2024	LLB: Life Line of Bachelors	CI Babu Sebastian	
2024	Nadikar	Chandradas	
2024	Checkmate		
2024	Njan Kandatha Sare		
2025	Raveendra Nee Evide?	Raveendran	
2026	Chiram		
2026	Ee Thani Niram †	SI Felix Lopez	

Key
†	Denotes films that have not yet been released

=== Director ===
- King Fish (2022)
- Padma (2022)

=== Screenwriter ===
Year	Film	Writer	Notes
2008	Pakal Nakshatrangal	Screenplay	
2009	Anubhav	Yes	
2010	Cocktail	Dialogues	
2011	Beautiful	Yes	
2012	Trivandrum Lodge	Yes	
2013	David and Goliath	Yes	
2013	Hotel California	Yes	
2013	D Company	Yes	Anthology film; segment: "Gangs of Vadakkumnathan"
2014	The Dolphins	Yes	
2018	Ente Mezhuthiri Athazhangal	Yes	

=== Lyricist ===
- Beautiful (2011)
- Namukku Parkkan (2012)
- Buddy (2013)
- Hotel California (2013)
- David & Goliath (2013)
- Angry Babies in Love (2014)
- The Dolphins (2014)
- She Taxi (2015)

== Television career ==
List of Anoop Menon television credits
Year	Title	Channel	Notes
1999	Manal Nagaram	Asianet	Screen debut as a guest role
2000	December Mist	Kairali TV	Debut in a telefilm
2002–2003	Sthree Janmam	Surya TV	Debut in a serial
2006	Radhamadhavam	Surya TV	
2003-2004	Swapnam	Asianet	
2004	Ashtapadhi	Surya TV	
2004-2025	Megham	Asianet	
2004	Muhoortham	Asianet	
2005–2006	Swaram	Amrita TV	
2006	Thadangalpaalayam	Asianet	
2007	Madhavam	Surya TV	
2019	Mounaragam	Asianet	Promo voiceover

== Awards ==
Asianet Film Awards

- 2012 - Asianet Film Awards for Special Jury Award - Various Films

Kerala State Film Awards

- 2014 - Second Best Actor - 1983, Vikramadithyan
- 2008 - Second Best Actor - Thirakkatha

Filmfare Awards South

- 2008 - Filmfare Award for Best Supporting Actor - Thirakkatha

South Indian International Movie Awards

- 2011 - Best Lyricist for "Mazhaneerthullikal" - Beautiful

Vanitha Film Awards

- 2011 - Best Supporting actor - Beautiful

Asiavision Awards

- 2011 - Best Supporting actor - Traffic
- 2012 - Trendsetter - Beautiful

Asianet Family award

- 2005 - Best Son in law - Swapnam
