= Baatein Ye Kabhi Na =

2015 Indian song

"Baatein Yeh Kabhi Naa"

Song by Arijit Singh (Male Version) and Palak Muchhal (Female Version)

from the album Khamoshiyan
- Language: Hindi
- Length: 4:49
- Label: Sony Music India
- Composer: Jeet Gannguli
- Lyricist: Sayeed Quadri
- Producer: Vishesh Films

Music video
- "Baatein Yeh Kabhi Na" on YouTube

"Baatein Yeh Kabhi Na" (transl. never(forget) these talks/conversations) is a song from Khamoshiyan, a 2015 Indian romantic horror film. The male version of this song was sung by Arijit Singh and the female version of this song by Palak Muchhal. It was composed by Jeet Gannguli with lyrics penned by Sayeed Quadri.

== Recognition and in popular culture ==
The song received significant media coverage in the Indian media when a Pakistani fruit seller sang the song, and a talent scouting organization from Pakistan uploaded the video on social media.

The song received further recognition when a security guard named Adarsh Singh sung the song and the video of him singing went viral on social media. The guard is believed to be fan of Arijit Singh, as he had previously sung other songs by Singh.

== Male version ==
"Baatein Yeh Kabhi Na" song features the voice and singing of Arijit Singh. The song is picturised on Gurmeet Chaudhary, Sapna Pabbi and Ali Fazal. The song was produced by Vishesh Films, whereas Sony Music India holds the copyright for the song.

== Critical reception ==
Bollywood Life wrote that "The track can be considered to be one of Jeet's best compositions of the recent times. The opening notes are laden with techno beats, which sounded very unlike Jeet, but its the later half of the song turns into a soothing melody".

"India.com" in its review wrote, Arijit Singh's soulful voice has added life to the beautiful lyrics penned by Sayeed Quadri. Jeet Gannguli has composed the music for this romantic number. The Indian Express wrote that this song along with Khamoshiyan title track and Tu har lamha sounds like Arjit Singh is on "autopilot".
