= Shandar, Iran =

Shandar (Persian: شندر) in Iran may refer to:

- Shandar, Gilan
- Shandar, West Azerbaijan

== See also ==
- Shaandaar (disambiguation)
