= Vikas Verma =

Indian actor and model

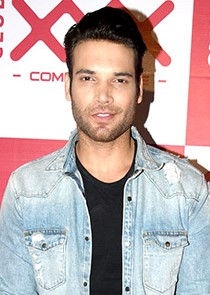
- Verma in 2018
- Born: 24 September 1987 (age 39); Kota, Rajasthan, India
- Occupations: Actor; Model
- Years active: 2009–present
- Known for: Yaariyan (2014); Shaandaar (2015); Mom (2017); Judwaa 2 (2017); Coolie No. 1 (2020)

Vikas Verma (born 24 September 1987) is an Indian actor and model who works primarily in Hindi films and television. He is known for his supporting and antagonistic roles in films such as Yaariyan (2014), Shaandaar (2015), Mom (2017), Judwaa 2 (2017) and Coolie No. 1 (2020).

== Early life and modelling ==
Verma was born on 24 September 1987 in Kota, Rajasthan. He started his career as a model and won the title of India's Fashion Star 2009 on Zoom TV. He has walked the ramp for various designers at fashion weeks in India and appeared in several television commercials.

== Career ==
=== Television ===
Verma made his acting debut in 2009 with the historical series Jhansi Ki Rani, in which he played the dual role of Marshall and Captain Robert Hamilton. He later appeared in Dhoondh Legi Manzil Humein (2010), Chandragupta Maurya (2011), Tenali Rama (2017), Porus (2017–2018) as Seleucus I Nicator, Chandragupta Maurya (2018–2019), and Jag Janani Maa Vaishno Devi – Kahani Mata Rani Ki (2019–2020) as Moor Asur.

=== Films ===
Verma made his film debut in 2014 with the romantic adventure Yaariyan, directed by Divya Khosla Kumar, playing the negative role of Mike. The same year, he appeared in the Punjabi film Kirpaan: The Sword of Honour.

In 2015, he portrayed Robin Fundwani in the romantic comedy Shaandaar, directed by Vikas Bahl. He followed this with appearances in Raabta (2017), Mom (2017) as Charles Diwan opposite Sridevi, and Judwaa 2 (2017) as Rocky.

In 2020, Verma played the antagonist Mahesh Pratap Singh in Coolie No. 1. His other film credits include Kaamyaab (2018), Main Zaroor Aaunga (2019), Virgin Bhanupriya (2020), Kahan Shuru Kahan Khatam (2024) and Sikandar (2025).

== Filmography ==
=== Films ===
Year	Title	Role	Notes
2014	Yaariyan	Mike	
2014	Kirpaan: The Sword of Honour	British Officer	Punjabi film
2015	Shaandaar	Robin Fundwani	
2017	Mom	Charles Diwan	
2017	Judwaa 2	Rocky	
2017	Raabta	Maanav	Special appearance
2018	Kaamyaab	Rahul Chopra	
2019	Main Zaroor Aaunga	Peter	
2020	Coolie No. 1	Mahesh Pratap Singh	Amazon Prime Video
2020	Virgin Bhanupriya	Irfan	ZEE5
2024	Kahan Shuru Kahan Khatam	Baby Singh	
2025	Sikandar	Salim	
2026	Tum Mere Ho		

=== Television ===
Year	Title	Role
2009–2011	Jhansi Ki Rani	Marshall / Captain Robert Hamilton
2010	Dhoondh Legi Manzil Humein	Ralph
2011	Chandragupta Maurya	Macedonian Soldier
2017	Tenali Rama	Marquis Da Pompadours
2017–2018	Porus	Seleucus I Nicator
2018–2019	Chandragupta Maurya	Seleucus I Nicator
2019–2020	Jag Janani Maa Vaishno Devi – Kahani Mata Rani Ki	Moor Asur

=== Web series ===
Year	Title	Role	Notes
2018	Gandii Baat	Kishan Sandhu	Episode: "Gudiya Rani"
