= Tum Mere Ho (disambiguation) =

"Tum Mere Ho" (transl. You are mine) may refer to:

- Tum Mere Ho, 1990 film by Tahir Hussain
- "Tum Mere Ho" (Jubin Nautiyal song), a song from film Hate Story 4
- Tum Mere Ho, 2026 film by Ashish Panda
