= Vivek Verma =

Indian singer-songwriter and Bollywood composer

Vivek Verma is an Indian composer and singer-songwriter from New Kenda, known for his work predominantly in Bollywood, He is known for his work on Tum Mere Ho and Sanam Teri Kasam. Verma started his career assisting Himesh Reshammiya. His work has been associated with Arijit Singh, Darshan Raval, Mohammad Faiz, Asees Kaur and Madhur Sharma.

His latest composition, the title track for the film Tum Mere Ho, received critically acclaim, with The Times Of India calling it the best song from the album.
