= Tum Mere Ho (2026 film) =

2026 Indian Hindi-language romantic drama film

- Directed by: Ashish Panda
- Screenplay by: Niranjan Iyengar
- Story by: Purva Naresh
- Starring: Gurmeet Choudhary; Isha Malviya; Shaan Grover; Anushkaa Luhar
- Music by: Mithoon; Sanju Rathod; Vivek Verma; Arjuna Harjai; Uddipan Sharma; Krish
- Production companies: Reva Creative House; DebGuru Films
- Distributed by: PVR Inox Pictures
- Release date: 23 October 2026
- Country: India
- Language: Hindi

Tum Mere Ho is a 2026 Indian Hindi-language romantic drama film directed by Ashish Panda starring Gurmeet Choudhary and Isha Malviya. The film marks Malviya's debut in Bollywood and Choudhary's first venture as a film producer. It was released theatrically on 23 October 2026.

== Plot ==
The film tells the story of Gurmeet Choudhary as Akash and Isha Malviya as Tamanna and how their lives come together as they navigate through being in love and going through personal struggles and the uncertainties that come with it. In the film Akash is a fearless guy who loves flying, while Tamanna is someone who always seems cheerful on the outside but has her own share of emotional battles..

Akash runs a private jet company in Thailand in which Nisha's (played by Anushka Luhar) father has invested. Akash sees Nisha with Bobby (played by Vikas Verma) and decides to keep away from her. He comes to India where he meets Tamanna, who enters into a marriage contract with him just so that her maternal grandmother (played by Lillete Dubey) would transfer all the family property in her name. Once the property is transferred in her name, Tamanna is ready to ditch Akash for Sahil (played by Shaan R. Grover) whom she actually loves.

== Cast ==
- Gurmeet Choudhary as Akash
- Isha Malviya as Tamanna
- Shaan Grover as Sahil
- Anushkaa Luhar as Nisha
- Lillete Dubey as Tamanna's maternal grandmother
- Nikhat Khan as Dadiji
- Adhik Mehta as Groom
- Shalini Kapoor as Chachiji
- Manik Bedi as Chachaji
- Romanch Mehta as Rumi
- Shreas Pardiwala as Leo
- Vikas Verma as Bobby
- Saumya Uniyal as Sneha
- Annissha Garg as Priya
- Khabir Mehta as Dimpy
- Vidhaan Sharma as Dholu

== Production ==
The film was directed by Ashish Panda and produced by Aarti S and Debina Bonnerjee, with Romanch Mehta and Aman Riyastee serving as co-producers. It was presented by Reva Creative House and DebGuru Films.

=== Filming ===
Filming was shot in Uttarakhand, including locations in and around Nainital. There was filming at Mall Road and the boat stand in Nainital, as well as planned filming in nearby areas.

Actor Shaan Grover also discussed spending time in Thailand with his co-star Isha Malviya during the film's production.

== Music ==
The film has composers like Mithoon, Sanju Rathod, Vivek Verma, Arjuna Harjai, Uddipan Sharma and Krish. The Album includes the title track, "Tum Mere Ho". The song features Gurmeet Choudhary and Isha Malviya has been composed by Vivek Verma & Krish and was written by Rashmi Virag. Mohammad Faiz performed the title track.

== Soundtrack ==
Tum Mere Ho

Soundtrack album by Mithoon, Vivek Verma, Arjuna Harjai, Sanju Rathod
- Released: 23rd October 2026
- Recorded: 2026
- Venue: Mumbai
- Genre: Feature film soundtrack
- Length: 28:00
- Label: Saregama
- Producer: Vaibhav Pani

=== Track listing ===
No.	Title	Lyrics	Singer(s)/Composer(s)	Length
1.	"Tum Mere Ho-(Title Track)"	Virag Mishra	Mohammad Faiz, Vivek Verma, Krish	4:43
2.	"Tumhein Bhi Humse"	Mithoon	Vishal Mishra (composer), Mithoon,	3:25
3.	"Nakhre"	Sanju Rathod	Sanju Rathod, G-SPXRK	2:41
4.	"Winter Ayun Waliye 2.0"	Geet Sagar	Arjuna Harjai, Jyotica Tangri	3:35
5.	"Dil Mera"	Azeem Shirazi	Asees Kaur, Madhur Sharma, Vivek Verma	3:14
6.	"Rubaroo"	Mithoon	Javed Ali, Mithoon	4:10
7.	"Mujhe Laga Tum Mere Ho"	Azeem Shirazi	Yashashree Venkatesh, Samyak Prasana, Uddipan Sharma	3:26
8.	"Lag Jaenge"	Vivek Verma	Vivek Verma	3:17
Total length:				28:00

== Release ==
Tum Mere Ho was released in cinemas on 23 October 2026. It opened to poor collections.

== Reception ==
Ronak Kotecha of The Times of India rated the film 3 out of 5 stars. He praised Choudhary's performance and described Malviya's work as promising for her first film, while noting weaknesses in the film's execution and characterisation. He also highlighted the soundtrack as one of the film's strengths.
