= Pallikoodam Pogamale =

2015 Indian film by Jayasheelan

- Film poster
- Directed by: Jayasheelan
- Written by: Jayasheelan
- Produced by: S. E. P. Thambi
- Starring: Tejas; Aishwarya Raja; Ganesh Venkatraman; Srihari
- Cinematography: U. K. Senthil Kumar
- Music by: Samson Kottoor
- Production company: Best Rolls
- Release date: 30 October 2015
- Running time: 130 minutes
- Country: India
- Language: Tamil

Pallikoodam Pogamale (transl. Without even going to school) is a 2015 Indian Tamil language drama film written and directed by Jayasheelan. The film features Tejas and Aishwarya Raja in the lead roles while Ganesh Venkatraman and Srihari plays pivotal roles. This films features the debut of Tejas (son of actor Alex) and Aishwarya. The film was shot at an international school near Kerala. This was Srihari's last film to date.

== Cast ==
- Tejas as Vijay
- Aishwarya Raja as Kayalvizhi "Kayal"
- Ganesh Venkatraman as Ganesh Venkatram IPS
- Srihari as JP
- Dileepan Pugazhendi as Kumar
- A. Venkatesh as Vijay's father, a taxi driver
- Devadarshini as Vijay's mother
- Raj Kapoor as Kayalvizhi's father, a wealthy man
- O. A. K. Sundar as the school teacher
- Sriranjani as the church mother

== Soundtrack ==
Tracklist
No.	Title	Lyrics	Singer(s)	Length
1.	"Deivatthai Parthathillai"	Na. Muthukumar	Karthik	4:27
2.	"Pallikkoodam Ponakkuda"	Jaya Seelan, Thanu Karthik	Najim Arshad, Balaji, Achu Rajamani (rap)	3:22
3.	"Vinnil Sellum Paravaigal"	Viveka	Balaji, Samson Kottoor, Elizabeth Raju	4:07
4.	"Sangu Chakkaram"	Viveka	Tippu, Najim Arshad	3:18
Total length:				15:14

== Reception ==
M Suganth of The Times of India wrote, "There is nothing edgy about the film, which, at times, feels like a tame retread of Thullovatho Ilamai's theme minus the raging hormones." Maalai Malar gave a negative review.
