= Sapna Pabbi =

British actress

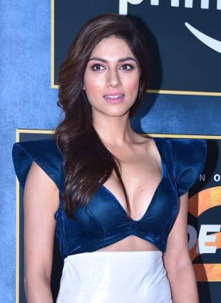
- Pabbi in 2019
- Born: 20 December 1988 (age 37); London, England
- Occupations: Actress; model
- Years active: 2012–present

Sapna Pabbi (born 20 December 1988) is a British actress and model known for her work as Kiran Rathod in the Indian television series 24 (2013, 2016) and the Hindi films Khamoshiyan (2015) and Drive (2019).

== Early life ==
Pabbi was born on 20 December 1988. in London, United Kingdom into a Hindu Punjabi family. She studied Finance in Aston University, Birmingham.

== Career ==
At the age of 22, whilst studying at Aston University in Birmingham, Pabbi was chosen as the face of Trinny and Susannah. Pabbi has appeared in Ghar Aaja Pardesi as Rudrani, and as Kiran Rathod in 24. Pabbi has also appeared in commercials, such as the Galaxy Chocolate ad alongside Arjun Rampal, the Pepsi ad with Virat Kohli and the Fair and Lovely ad alongside Yami Gautam. Pabbi has also acted in a co-production between Vishesh Films and Fox Star Studios, Khamoshiyan, directed by debutant Karan Darra opposite Ali Fazal and Gurmeet Chaudhary.

== Filmography ==
Key
†	Denotes films that have not yet been released

=== Films ===
Year	Title	Role	Language	Notes	Ref.
2015	Khamoshiyan	Meera Sharma Dhanrajgir	Hindi		
2018	Tholi Prema	Sunaina	Telugu	Cameo appearance	
2018	Mar Gaye Oye Loko	Simran	Punjabi		
2019	Sepia	Kaavya Prabhakar	Hindi	Short film	
2019	Ardaas Karaan	Sukhdeep	Punjabi		
2019	Drive	Naina Sethi	Hindi		
2023	Almost Pyaar with DJ Mohabbat	Sapna	Hindi		
2023	Sergeant	Monica	Hindi	Releasing on JioCinema	
2025	Sardaar Ji 3	Monica	Punjabi		
2025	Bandar	Gayatri	Hindi; Marathi; English	Monkey in a Cage at TIFF	

=== Television ===
Year	Title	Role	Notes	Ref.
2013	Ghar Aaja Pardesi	Rudrani		
2013	24	Kiran Jai Singh Rathod		
2016	24: Season 2	Kiran Jai Singh Rathod		

=== Web series ===
Year	Title	Role	Notes	Ref.
2016-2018	The Trip	Sanjana	2 Seasons	
2018	Breathe	Ria Ganguly		
2018	The Reunion	Aarya Singh		
2019	Bombers	Andy		
2019	Four More Shots Please!	Akanksha Moitra	Season 1	
2019-2021	Inside Edge	Mantra Patil	Season 2,3	
2022	London Files	Ashwini		
2022	Never Kiss Your Best Friend 2	Alisha		
2023	United Kacche	Daisy Patel		
