= Achaaram =

2015 film by Mohan Krishna

- Directed by: Mohan Krishna
- Written by: Mohan Krishna
- Produced by: A. Sankara Padma
- Starring: Ganesh Venkatraman; Munna; Poonam Kaur
- Cinematography: R. K. Prathap
- Edited by: Suresh Urs
- Music by: Srikanth Deva
- Production company: Dhaaru Nisha Movies
- Release date: 19 June 2015
- Country: India
- Language: Tamil

Achaaram is a 2015 Tamil-language crime thriller film written and directed by Mohan Krishna and produced by A. Sankara Padma. The film stars Ganesh Venkatraman, Munna, and Poonam Kaur in the lead roles. The music was composed by Srikanth Deva with cinematography by R. K. Prathap and editing by Suresh Urs. The film was released on 19 June 2015.

== Plot ==
Suriya, a sub-inspector, hates modern women and kills them secretly at night. When he meets Ramya, the wife of an architect, he becomes obsessed with her.

== Cast ==
- Ganesh Venkatraman as Suriya
- Munna as Siva
- Poonam Kaur as Ramya
- Rekha
- Gnanadesh Ambedkar
- O. A. K. Sundar as Inspector Ramanathan
- Rajya Lakshmi as Rajya Lakshmi
- Aishwarya Dutta as Nandhini (cameo appearance)

== Soundtrack ==
The soundtrack was composed by Srikanth Deva, while lyrics written by Yugabharathi.

- "Kokkoga" – Nincy Vincent
- "Unna Vida Maatten" – M. L. R. Karthikeyan, Srilekha Parthasarathy
- "En Veettukku" – Vijay Yesudas
- "Amma En" – Nivas
- "Perazhagai" – Sooraj Santhosh, Mahathi

== Critical reception ==
Rediff gave the film 2.5 stars out of 5 and called it a "decent thriller". Deccan Chronicle gave the same rating and wrote, "good execution and noteworthy performances make Achaaram a fulfilling experience", while calling it a "tactfully arranged psychological thriller". The New Indian Express wrote, "The debutant director has tried to offer a dark psychological thriller with some freshness. But the screenplay could have been more interestingly crafted and the narrative style more polished. Achaaram is at the most a promising work of a debutant maker". Sify wrote, "Acharam is watchable for the good performance of Ganesh Venkatraman and also for the basic story-line which reflects the current happenings in the society".
