= United Kacche =

Indian Hindi-language web-series

- United Kacche Official Poster
- Created by: Manoj Sabharwal
- Written by: Gaurav Sharma; Manoj Sabharwal; Ali Haji; Khush Mullick; Veer Panchal; Sudarshan Pareek; Ravi Ra; Parth Ahuja
- Directed by: Manav Shah; Dharampal Thakur
- Starring: Sunil Grover; Manu Rishi Chaddha; Nikhil Vijay; Nayani Dixitt; Sapna Pabbi; Diksha Juneja; Neelu Kohli; Poojan Chhabra; Satish Shah
- Music by: Dr Zeus; Upmanyu Bhanot
- Country of origin: India
- Original language: Hindi
- No. of episodes: 8

Production
- Producers: Vikram Mehra; Siddharth Anand Kumar
- Production company: Yoodlee Films

Original release
- Network: ZEE5
- Release: 31 March 2023

United Kacche is Hindi-language Slice of life comedy series starring Sunil Grover, Manu Rishi, Sapna Pabbi, Satish Shah, Nayani Dixitt, Neelu Kohli and Diksha Juneja. It is produced by Yoodlee Films and directed by Manav Shah and Dharampal Thakur. The show premiered on ZEE5 on 31 March 2023. It revolves around the lives of Indians, Pakistanis and Bangladeshis who are living in England as illegal immigrants and are thus known as Kachche.

The first news reports on the show appeared in December 2022, when it was reported as Sunil Grover and Sapna Pabbi have been signed by ZEE5.

== Plot ==
Tejnder Gill aka Tango manages to complete his father's lifelong wish to migrate to Europe, albeit illegally. The show follows Tejinder life in the UK as a "Kaccha", his relationship with his roommates, his family, his love life and his struggles finding a job while trying to avoid authorities.

== Cast ==
- Sunil Grover as Tango (Tejinder) Gill
- Manu Rishi Chaddha as Sajjad
- Nikhil Vijay as Shampy (Shyam Banerjee), Bampy
- Nayani Dixitt as Zareen
- Sapna Pabbi as Daisy Patel
- Diksha Juneja as Jasmin
- Neelu Kohli as Kuljeet Kaur (Tango's Mother)
- Poojan Chhabra as Jazz (Tango's brother)
- Satish Shah as Jogu Chimanlal Pate
- Jeniffer Piccinato as Kim
- Alexandra Taylor as Christina

== Episodes ==
No.	Title	Directed by	Original release date
1	"London Aaye?"	Manav Shah & Dharampal Thakur	March 31, 2023
2	"Jet Lag"	Manav Shah & Dharampal Thakur	March 31, 2023
3	"Pehli Job, Dusra Pyaar"	Manav Shah & Dharampal Thakur	March 31, 2023
4	"Bus-king"	Manav Shah & Dharampal Thakur	March 31, 2023
5	"Halloween Mubarak"	Manav Shah & Dharampal Thakur	March 31, 2023
6	"Shaadi at the Strip"	Manav Shah & Dharampal Thakur	March 31, 2023
7	"Love Bite"	Manav Shah & Dharampal Thakur	March 31, 2023
8	"The Kaccha Heist"	Manav Shah & Dharampal Thakur	March 31, 2023
