= Khamoshiyan =

2015 Hindi film directed by Karan Darra

- Movie Poster
- Directed by: Karan Darra
- Written by: Vikram Bhatt
- Produced by: Mahesh Bhatt (Presenter); Mukesh Bhatt
- Starring: Ali Fazal; Sapna Pabbi; Gurmeet Choudhary
- Cinematography: Nigam Bomzan
- Edited by: Kuldip K. Mehan
- Music by: Songs: Jeet Gannguli; Ankit Tiwari; Bobby Imraan; Navad Zafar; Background Score: Raju Singh
- Production company: Vishesh Films
- Distributed by: Fox Star Studios
- Release date: 30 January 2015
- Running time: 122 minutes
- Country: India
- Language: Hindi
- Box office: est. ₹19.50 crore (US$2.0 million)

Khamoshiyan (stylised as KHAMOSHIYAN: Silences Have Secrets) (transl. Silences) is a 2015 Indian Hindi-language romantic thriller horror film, written by Vikram Bhatt and directed by debutant, Karan Darra. Mahesh Bhatt and Mukesh Bhatt produced the film in association with Vishesh Films.

The film stars Gurmeet Choudhary, Ali Fazal and Sapna Pabbi in lead roles. Initially, the film was scheduled for release on 23 January 2015 but was postponed to 30 January 2015. According to Box Office India the film was declared "average."

== Plot ==
Kabir Malhotra is a novelist whose failed career and relationship with Simran made him move to Kashmir in search of an inspirational story. During his journey, he stops at a guesthouse run by the beautiful but mysterious Meera Sharma Dhanrajgir. Meera is married to Jaidev Dhanrajgir, an ill man confined to his bed. On his first night there, Kabir sees strange apparitions. He becomes attracted to Meera and finds out that she has not left the house for two years.

Kabir, now in love with her, tries to take her away from the house. While driving away, an evil force comes before their car and they meet with an accident. Curious, Kabir calls a Tantrik, who discovers an evil spirit in the house. He claims that the spirit is of Jaidev, who is dead. Realization dawns upon Kabir, and he recalls Meera speaking on the phone in a man's voice and never seeing Jaidev in person. He sneaks into Jaidev's room, only to find Jaidev sleeping. Furious with Kabir, Meera tells him to leave.

Kabir returns to apologize to Meera and writes a love poem for her. She reads it and suddenly kisses him, realizing that she is in love with him. She reveals that she was involved in a hit-and-run case two years ago and, to evade imprisonment, ran away to a small town in Kashmir, where she met Jaidev, a rich industrialist. They fell in love, and they got married. One night, she saw him performing a ritual slaughter and praying to the devil. Scared and shocked, she tried to run away but was caught by him. In a struggle to stop her, Jaidev fell from the balcony and was paralyzed below the waist. He later committed suicide and left a letter for Meera, stating that she would have to live in the house forever with his soul, and if she ever tried to run away, his lawyer was instructed to open a letter that would detail that Meera had killed him and was the culprit in the hit-and-run. Thus, she stays in the house with Jaidev's soul and deludes the world into thinking her husband is still alive.

Kabir decides to steal the letter from the lawyer's office; however, he finds that there is no lawyer – Jaidev was bluffing. After this, the two plan to put Jaidev's spirit to rest. While they cremate his body, a painting of Jaidev smiles sadistically. He returns to haunt Meera and captures her in the painting. Kabir goes to the Tantrik for help, who, it turns out, is also a spirit. The Tantrik tells Kabir that the painting is a portal to the world of spirits and gives Kabir holy water. After a deadly struggle involving a butterfly and paintings of wolves, Kabir drinks a drop of Jaidev's blood to get Jaidev's spirit to enter his body. He then drinks holy water, which makes Jaidev's evil spirit perish, setting Meera free.

Kabir is shown at a book launch for Khamoshiyan, his latest novel. Meera is also at the party, but the two leave to spend some time alone together.

== Cast ==
- Sapna Pabbi as Meera Sharma Dhanrajgir, a beautiful but mysterious lady who runs a hotel in Kashmir. She lives a lonely and worthless life as Jaidev's Widow until she meets Kabir and falls in love with him.
- Ali Fazal as Kabir Malhotra, a lonely novelist who searches for an inspiring story; meets Meera and falls in love with her. He vows to protect her from the evil spirit.
- Gurmeet Choudhary as Jaidev Dhanrajgir, Meera's devil worshipping husband, who bonds her even after his death as an evil spirit.
- Vikram Bhatt as Kabir's editor/friend
- Debina Bonnerjee as Simran, Kabir's ex-girlfriend
- Vinod Rawat as the good spirit

== Production ==
=== Development ===
The main cast of Gurmeet Choudhary, Ali Fazal and Sapna Pabbi was finalized in mid-2014. In May 2014, it was reported that Gurmeet Choudhary will be playing a negative role in the film. In June 2014, actress Sapna Pabbi signed a three-film deal with Vishesh Films and committed to work on the film as her first movie of the contract. In an interview, Fazal stated that he plays a romantic writer with grey shades in the film. Producer Mahesh Bhatt in an interview said "With a recipe of great music, state-of-art digital effects and a love story that brings back the intrigue of Mahal, it will repackage and raise the bar for the horror genre in Bollywood". Bhatt further added that the film has the potential of becoming a franchise. Ankit Tiwari was hired to compose the film's music.

=== Filming ===
The shoot of the film's first schedule began on 5 June 2014 and ended in August 2014. Shooting for the film's second schedule took place in Kashmir in September 2014 for 15 days. Due to a high flood in Kashmir, the producers had to shift the shoot to South Africa, as a replacement for Kashmir. On 21 October 2014, filming took place in Cape Town. The pre-climax was filmed at the forests of Legacy Estates in Cape Town.

=== Marketing ===
A video was created to announce the launch date of a trailer of Khamoshiyan. It was uploaded on the video sharing platform, YouTube. The video only featured background music and was used to introduce the characters, unveil the logo and the tagline. The film's music launch was held in a venue below ground level, making it the first underground music launch event for a Hindi film.

The filmmakers also announced the launch of a novel and a video game. The novel will feature the story of Khamoshiyan and two other stories penned by Vikram Bhatt – 1920 and 1920: Evil Returns. On the other hand, the video game will feature different characters who will all unveil a dark secret and tell a different story as the player advances.

== Soundtrack ==
Khamoshiyan

Soundtrack album to Khamoshiyan by: Jeet Gannguli; Ankit Tiwari; Naved Jafar; Bobby-Imran
- Released: 26 December 2014
- Genre: Feature film soundtrack
- Length: 47:09
- Label: Sony Music
- Producers: Mahesh Bhatt (Presenter); Mukesh Bhatt

The soundtrack of Khamoshiyan was composed by Ankit Tiwari, Jeet Gannguli, Navad Zafar & Bobby Imraan. The lyrics for the soundtrack were penned by Rashmi Singh and Sayeed Quadri.

The first single from the album, "Khamoshiyan", composed by Jeet Gannguli and crooned by Arijit Singh was released on 10 December 2014. The second single from the album, "Tu Har Lamha", composed by Bobby Imraan and sung by Arijit Singh, was released on 19 December 2014.

Additionally, the filmmakers purchased the rights to the song "Aayega Aane Wala" from the film Mahal (1949).

The song "Beegh Loon" was Sung by Prakriti Kakar to Describe Meera and Jaidev's Love Story and how they Got Married.

=== Track listing ===
| No. | Title | Lyrics | Music | Singer(s) | Length |
|---|---|---|---|---|---|
| 1. | "Khamoshiyan" (Title Track) | Rashmi Singh | Jeet Gannguli | Arijit Singh | 5:30 |
| 2. | "Tu Har Lamha" | Sayeed Quadri | Bobby-Imraan | Arijit Singh | 4:32 |
| 3. | "Baatein Ye Kabhi Na" (Male) | Sayeed Quadri | Jeet Gannguli | Arijit Singh | 4:49 |
| 4. | "Kya Khoya" | Rashmi Singh | Naved Jafar | Naved Jafar | 5:28 |
| 5. | "Baatein Ye Kabhi Na" (Female) | Sayeed Quadri | Jeet Gannguli | Palak Muchhal | 4:49 |
| 6. | "Subhan Allah" | Sayeed Quadri | Bobby-Imran | Anupam Amod, Imran Ali | 4:31 |
| 7. | "Bheegh Loon" (Male) | Abhendra Kumar Upadhyay | Ankit Tiwari | Ankit Tiwari | 4:07 |
| 8. | "Bheegh Loon" (Female) | Abhendra Kumar Upadhyay | Ankit Tiwari | Prakriti Kakar | 4:07 |
| 9. | "Khamoshiyan" (Unplugged) | Rashmi Singh | Jeet Gannguli | Arijit Singh | 2:30 |
| 10. | "Tu Har Lamha" (Remix) | Sayeed Quadri | Bobby-Imran | Arijit Singh, DJ Angel | 4:18 |
| 11. | "Bheegh Loon" (Female – Remix) | Abhendra Kumar Upadhyay | Ankit Tiwari | Prakriti Kakar, DJ Angel | 3:15 |
| 12. | "Khamoshiyan" (Mashup) | | | DJ Angel | 2:18 |
| 13. | "Khamoshiyan" (Female) | Rashmi Singh | Jeet Gannguli | Amika Shail | 2:58 |
| Total length: | | | | | 47:09 |

=== Critical response to soundtrack ===
Rediff.com wrote that "the album gets off to a superb start with the man for all seasons, Arijit Singh's title song Khamoshiyan. This romantic song has a pleasant feel and maintains a good pace throughout. The rendition of "Tu Har Lamha" is heartfelt and the lyrics are simple yet effective. Tu Har Lamha is a winner in both its original as well as remix version. "Baatein Ye Kabhi Na" reminds of one of the songs in Aashiqui 2, with its themes of love, separation and longing."

Surabhi Redkar of Komoi gave the soundtrack three stars out of five and wrote that it was a "love-filled album" but its "varied song versions" didn't favor the album instead "[leaving] the listener a little startled". She praised the title track "Khamoshiyan" writing that it was "a beautiful composition".

In a negative review, Sankhayan Ghosh of The Indian Express gave the soundtrack two stars out of five writing that the tunes were "worn out" and that their arrangement and melody sounded so similar that "one can actually stitch all of them seamlessly into one song."

== Critical response ==
Shakti Shetty of Mid-Day.com noted similarities between Khamoshiyan and Alfred Hitchcock's Psycho and Robert Zemeckis' What Lies Beneath, but commented, "the Indianisation doesn't really come out great." On the story's pacing, Shetty wrote, "If the first half was building up tension with sub-plots of mysteries, the second half does a tedious job of chronicling what happened in the past."

Renuka Vyavahare of The Times of India gave the movie 1.5 stars out of five writing that Fazal and Pabbi were "decent" but the horror track failed miserably and comprised "standard scares, [an] over-stretched climax, formulaic ‘dark secrets’ and a clichéd story."

For The Indian Express, Shubhra Gupta gave Khamoshiyan 1.5 stars out of five, writing that the movie "does exactly what you expect" and "plays out familiar erotic-horror-thriller ingredients."

== Awards and nominations ==
| Award | Category | Recipients and nominees | Result | Ref. |
|---|---|---|---|---|
| 8th Mirchi Music Awards | Best Song Engineer (Recording & Mixing) | Pankaj Borah & Eric Pillai – "Khamoshiyan" | Nominated | |
