= Mayavi (TV series) =

- Genre: Action; Fantasy; Adventure; Thriller; Romance
- Directed by: R.Elavarasan
- Starring: Ganesh Venkatraman; Debina Bonnerjee; Gurmeet Choudhary; Kalidas; Master Atharva; Ramesh
- Music by: Niru
- Country of origin: India
- Original language: Tamil
- No. of episodes: 26

Production
- Producer: V. Ravee
- Camera setup: Sony Beta Sp Camera by Aryan. S.L
- Running time: approx. 22–24 minutes per episode
- Production company: GV Films

Original release
- Network: Jaya TV
- Release: 2006 – 2007

Mayavi is a 2006–2007 Indian-Tamil language 3D fantasy adventure thriller series starring Ganesh Venkatraman, Debina Bonnerjee, Gurmeet Choudhary. It was the first Indian 3D series. It aired on Jaya TV every Saturday at 21:00 (IST) for 26 episodes. The series won the Special Prize at Seoul International Drama Awards in 2007, and was the first Indian entry to be on the award list.

== Plot ==
Vikram (Ganesh Venkatraman) has special powers: each of his five fingers is capable of drawing one of the five basic elements (fire, wind, water, earth, ether). He becomes a living legend in fighting crime, and the nemesis of all evil men throughout the world.

== Cast ==
- Ganesh Venkatraman as Vikram
- Debina Bonnerjee as Shakthi
- Gurmeet Choudhary as Hiranyan
- Kalidas as Rajaguru
- Master Atharva as Akash
- Ramesh as Gummy

== Produced ==
The series is produced by Tamil cinema director Mani Ratnam's brother GV Ratnam.

- Creative head – V. Ravee, C.E.O GV films Ltd
- Writer director – R.Elavarasan, B.A.D.F.
- Tech music – Niru
- Camera – Aryan. S.L
- Playback singer – Bhuvanakriti
- Anaglyph technology – K.Yuvarajan
- Graphics – Sanra Software Limited

== Awards and nominations ==
| Year | Award | Category | Recipient | Result |
|---|---|---|---|---|
| 2007 | Seoul International Drama Awards | Special Prize | Mayavi | Won |

== International broadcast ==
In India, the series aired as Mayavi in the state of Kerala on Kairali TV dubbed in Malayalam, and in the state of Andhra Pradesh on Zee Telugu dubbed in Telugu from October 2007. It was also dubbed in other languages like Hindi, Marathi, Bengali, Gujarati and Rajasthani for all the others Indian channels.

As The Iron Handed Phantom – Mayavi, the series aired dubbed in South Korea, China (in Mandarin) and Australia. It also aired in Europe.
