= New Kenda =

New Kenda न्यू केन्दा
- Census Town
- Location in West Bengal, India New Kenda (India)
- Coordinates: 23.4040°N 87.1033°E
- Country: India
- State: West Bengal
- District: Paschim Bardhaman
- Time zone: UTC+5:30 (IST)
- Postal code: 713342
- Vehicle registration: WB
- Lok Sabha constituency: Asansol
- Vidhan Sabha constituency: Jamuria
- Website: bardhaman.gov.in

New Kenda is a census town in the Jamuria CD block in the Asansol Sadar subdivision in the Paschim Bardhaman district in the Indian state of West Bengal.

== Geography ==
Cities and towns in the eastern portion of Asansol Sadar subdivision in Paschim Bardhaman district
MC: Municipal Corporation, CT: census town, N: neighbourhood, R: rural centre
Owing to space constraints in the small map, the actual locations in a larger map may vary slightly

== Healthcare ==
Medical facilities in the Kenda Area of ECL are available at Chhora Regional Hospital (with 30 beds) (PO Bahula), New Kenda (PO New Kenda), Lower Kenda (PO Haripur), Bahula (PO Bahula), CL Jambad (PO Bahula), Siduli (PO Siduli), Haripur (PO Haripur), CBI (PO Haripur), Chora Group pits (PO Haripur) ).

== Notable people ==
- Vivek Verma — Bollywood Composer & Singer/Songwriter
