= Ramayan (2008 TV series) =

Indian devotional television series

- Genre: Epic
- Created by: Anand Sagar
- Based on: Ramayana by Valmiki
- Written by: Umesh Chandra Upadhyay
- Directed by: Anand Sagar
- Starring: Gurmeet Choudhary; Debina Bonnerjee
- Opening theme: Jai Shri Ram By Suresh Wadkar and Kavita Krishnamurthy
- Composer: Ravindra Jain
- Country of origin: India
- Original language: Hindi
- No. of seasons: 1
- No. of episodes: 300

Production
- Executive producer: Rakesh Jain
- Producers: Subhash Sagar; Prem Sagar; Moti Sagar
- Editor: Pappu Trivedi
- Running time: 20 minutes
- Production company: Sagar Films

Original release
- Network: Imagine TV
- Release: 21 January 2008 – 26 June 2009

Related
- Ramayan (1987)

Ramayan is an Indian television series based on the lives of Rama and Hanuman. The 2008 release is a reboot of the 1987 television series of the same name. The original revered saga is first written and told in true spirit from great venerable Saint and poet Shree Maharshi Valmiki's Ramayana, Tulsidas' Ramcharitmanas and Chakbasta's Urdu Ramayan with aspects of other works. The devotional television series was produced by Sagar Arts and aired on NDTV Imagine. This Show Was Re-Aired On Dangal TV while the entire episodes of this show can be watched on Dangal Play app.

== Synopsis ==
Ramayan tells the story of Rama, the eldest son of Dasharatha, the King of Ayodhya. Rama is due to become king after his father's retirement, but his stepmother, Kaikeyi wants her son Bharat to take the throne.

As King Dashratha had earlier promised to fulfill any two wishes for her, Kaikeyi demands that Rama should be banished to the forest for fourteen years and that Bharat should be crowned as king. Dasharatha keeps his word and with a heavy heart asks Rama to leave for the forest. Rama accepts the exile and is accompanied by his wife Sita and younger brother Lakshmana. When Bharat learns that his mother is responsible for Rama's exile he renounces her and beseeches Rama to return to Ayodhya. Rama declines, whereupon Bharat places Rama's paduka on the throne as a symbol that Rama is the true king.

Bharat served Ayodhya for the next fourteen years keeping Paduka of Rama on the throne. Ravan, the evil King of Lanka, abducts Sita, prompting Rama, Lakshmana, Hanuman and his army of apes, the Vanara Sena, to rescue her and Rama to kill Ravan.

Season 2 focuses on Ram-Sita's life after returning from exile, the birth of Luv-Kush, their reunion with the royal family and final departure of Sita and Ram from the earth.

== Cast ==
Portrayed By	Character	Role
Gurmeet Choudhary	Rama	King of Ayodhya; Eldest Son of Kaushalya and Dasharatha. Prince of Ayodhya. Sita's husband. Father of Luv and Kush.
Gurmeet Choudhary	Vishnu	God of Preservation. Husband of Lakshmi. Ram is his incarnation.
Debina Bonnerjee	Sita	Queen of Ayodhya; Daughter of the earth goddess Bhūmi; Adopted daughter of King Siradhwaj Janaka of Mithila, later becoming princess of Mithila and Queen Sunaina. Sister of Urmila. Wife of Rama. Mother of Lava and Kusha.
Debina Bonnerjee	Lakshmi	Goddess of Wealth. Wife of Vishnu. Sita is her incarnation.
Rishabh Sharma	Kusha	One of the twin sons of Ram and Sita. Twin brother of Lav.
Perin Monish Malde	Lava	One of the twin sons of Ram and Sita. Twin brother of Kush.
Ankit Arora	Lakshmana	Brother and close companion of Ram. He is the twin brother of Shatrughna, born to Sumitra, the third wife of Dasharatha, his father. Thus, Lakshmana is the third eldest son of Dasharatha.
Meenakshi Arya	Urmila	Real daughter of King Siradhwaj Janaka of Mithila and Queen Sunaina, sister of Sita, wife of Lakshmana.
Vikram Mastal (Sharma)	Hanuman	Hanuman is an ardent devotee of Ram and a central character in the Indian epic Ramayana. A general among the vanaras, Hanuman is a disciple of Ram in the war against the demon king Ravan.
Akhilendra Mishra	Ravan	King of Lanka and brother of Surpanakha.
Jaya Ojha	Mandodari	Queen Consort of Ravana.
Ashok Banthia	Viswamitra	A sage who takes Ram and Lakshman to protect his rituals, in the course of time he took both of them to Janakpuri, to attend Sita swayamvar.
Pankaj Kalra	Dasharatha	Father of Ram and his brothers.
Vije Bhatia	Bharata	Brother of Ram, and the son of Dasaratha and Kaikeyi. He is the second eldest son of Dasharatha.
Krupa Chandera	Mandavi	Elder daughter of Kushadhwaj and Chandrabhaga, wife of Bharata, Sita and Urmila's cousin and elder sister of Shrutakirti.
Lalit Negi	Shatrughna	Brother and close companion of Bharat. He is the twin brother of Lakshmana and son of Dasaratha and his third wife, Sumitra. He is the youngest son of Dasharatha.
Annu Dangi / Sudeepta Singh	Shrutakirti	Younger daughter of Kushadhwaj and Chandrabhaga, wife of Shatrughna, Sita and Urmila's cousin and younger sister of Mandavi.
Rajni Chandra	Kaushalya	The eldest of King Daśaratha's three wives, she was the daughter of the King of the Kosala Kingdom. She was the mother of Ram. A queen of Ayodhya later a dowager queen.
Hemaakshi Ujjain	Kaikeyi	One of the three wives of Dasharatha and mother of Bharat. A queen of Ayodhya later a dowager queen.
Sangeeta Kapure	Sumitra	One of the three wives of Dasharatha and mother of twins, Shatrughna and Lakshman. A queen of Ayodhya later a dowager queen.
Vinod Kapoor	Vibhishan	He was the younger brother of the Rakshasa (demon) king Ravana of Lanka. Though a Rakshasa himself, Vibhishana was of a noble character and advised Ravana, who kidnapped and abducted Sita, to return her to her husband Ram in an orderly fashion and promptly. When his brother did not listen to his advice, Vibhishana joined Ram's army. Later, when Ram defeated Ravana, Ram crowned Vibhishana as the king of Lanka.
Praphulla Pandey	Indrajit	A warrior mentioned in the Indian epic Ramayana, was the son of the Lankan king Ravana.
Rakesh Deewana	Kumbhakarna	He is a demon and brother of Ravana in the Indian Ramayana epic. Despite his monstrous size and great hunger, he was described to be of good character, though he killed and ate many Hindu monks just to show his power.
Paras Arora	Young Ram	Eldest son of Kaushalya and Dasharatha, King of Ayodhya. Also an avatar of Vishnu.
Gyan Prakash	Janaka	King of Mithila and father of Sita and Urmila, also called Rajrishi.
Prairna Agarwal / Falguni Dave	Sunayana	Queen of Mithila and Janaka’s wife and Sita and Urmila’s mother.
Brownie Parasher	Vashishtha	Guru of Dashratha and his sons and Royal priest of Ayodhya.
Mamta Luthra	Arundhati	Wife of Vashishth.

=== Additional cast ===
- Avinash Mukherjee as Young Bharat
- Harsh Somaiya as Young Shatrughan
- Richa Mukherjee as Young Shrutakirti
- Manish Arora as Devantaka, son of Ravana
- Aziz Ansari as Vali, Sugriv's brother and King of Kishkindha, Sugriva, a friend of Lord Rama and the King of Kishkindha
- Raman Khatri as Kubera and Valmiki, a sage who composed Ramayan, story of Lord Ram
- Romanch Mehta as Narantaka, son of Ravana/Lavanasura, nephew of Ravana
- Nitin Joshi as Atikaya, son of Ravana
- Milind Soman as Malyavan, elder brother of Sumali and Mali
- Amit Pachori as Lord Shiva
- Radha Krishna Dutt as King Sagara
- Falguni Rajani as Shurpanakha, Ravan's sister
- Neha Bam as Kaikasi, Ravan's mother
- Sanjeev Siddharth as Ahiravana, brother of Ravana
- Deepak Bhatia as Mahiravana, brother of Ravana
- Khushabu Duggal as Malvika, Maid and Friend of Sita in Mithila
- Bhupindder Bhoopii as Akampana, chief commander of Lanka
- Arun Mathur as Sumali, maternal grandfather of Ravana
- Akshita arora as Trijata , Sita's Motherly protector in Lanka

== Production ==
Omang Kumar designed the sets and Nisha Sagar designed the costumes. Anand Sagar, son of late Ramanand Sagar, directed the series having worked on the script for about six months with this team. The series was shot at "Sagar Film City" in Baroda (now Vadodara).

Speaking about getting the role of Sita Deblina Bonnerjee said, " I auditioned for a television show but, after that, I didn't want to do it. After some time, I auditioned for a mythological show for Sagar productions but I didn't know it was for Ramayan. I was selected and realised, during the mock rehearsals, that I was playing Sita."

Speaking about his training, Gurmeet Choudhary said, "I had to build six-pack abs and do strength training. Also, since the producers didn’t want the next-gen Ram to sport a wig – that would have looked too cosmetic in today’s day and age – I grew my hair for one-and-a-half years."

About 100 kg (220 lb) of flowers were brought from Mumbai to the sets at Baroda daily for the sequence of Ram and Sita's marriage.

== Music ==
Ravindra Jain, who composed music for the 1980s series returned as a composer. Playback singers included Kavita Subramaniam and Suresh Wadkar. An audio CD with 17 bhajans from the series was released in 2009 with lyrics/music by Jain and the voices of singers Suresh Wadkar, Kavita Subramaniam, Sadhana Sargam, Satish Dehra, Pamela Jain, Ravi Tripathi, Amaya Daate, Rekha Rao, Prem Prakash, Kuldeep, Subhash Srivastav, Sanket, and the composer himself.

== Reception ==
The show had an average opening with a rating of 1.8 TVR in the premiere day and overall 1.5 TVR in its opening week and in a month peaked 3.19 TVR. Within three months, it became one of the most watched Hindi GEC garnering 5.2 TVR, increasing the viewership of the channel to third position after StarPlus and Zee TV. In May 2008, it averaged 1.60 TVR before which it peaked with 3.9 TVR in March 2008.

== Dubbed versions ==
The series was dubbed in Malayalam on Surya TV, featuring songs sung by Unni Krishnan, in Tamil on Sun TV from 2008 to 2010, in Telugu on Gemini TV. The Gujarati version aired on ETV Gujarati.
