= Inayathalam =

- Theatrical release poster
- Directed by: Shankar-Suresh
- Starring: Ganesh Venkatraman; Shweta Menon; Erode Mahesh; Sukanya; Delhi Ganesh; Y. G. Mahendra
- Cinematography: Karthik Raja
- Edited by: M. R. Rejeesh
- Music by: Arrol Corelli
- Release date: 19 May 2017
- Running time: 121 min
- Country: India
- Language: Tamil

Inayathalam (transl. Website) is a 2017 Indian Tamil-language crime film, written and directed by newcomer director duo Shankar-Suresh. The film features Ganesh Venkatraman, Shweta Menon, Erode Mahesh and Sukanya in the lead roles, with Delhi Ganesh and Y. G. Mahendra in supporting roles. Featuring music composed by Arrol Corelli, Inayathalam was released on 19 May 2017 to negative reviews.

Based on Untraceable (2008, film), the film involves a serial killer who rigs contraptions that kill his victims based on the number of hits received by a website that features a live streaming video of the victim. Millions of people log on, hastening the victims' deaths.

== Cast ==
- Ganesh Venkatraman as Ganesh
- Y. G. Mahendra as I.G. Sabapathy
- Delhi Ganesh as Panjabikesan
- Erode Mahesh as Ganapathy
- Sukanya as Chandrika
- Shweta Menon as Helen
- G. Koushika
- Adams as News reporter Naveen
- Mohana as Naveen's girl friend
- Ishwarya
- Baby Chetana as Steffi
- Gautham Kurup
- Nippu Samy
- Kovai Ramesh
- Malaysia Rajendran
- Thani Oruvan Jack
- Nithin
- M. Dinesh
- Ragav Mahesh
- Sandeep
- Rudel
- Karthick Raja

== Production ==
Shankar and Suresh, a charted accountant and a doctor, respectively, joined to direct their first feature film Inayathalam, a movie on cyber crime. Ganesh Venkatraman and Shweta Menon were signed to play the lead roles of investigation officers. The film began its shoot in August 2016 for two days, before resuming shoot in September. Portions of the film were shot in Kari Motor Speedway, Chettipalayam before the team moved to Coimbatore in October 2016.
