= Panithuli =

2012 Indian film by Natty Kumar and Dr. Jay

- Promotional poster in Tamil
- Directed by: Natty Kumar; Dr. Jay
- Produced by: Natty Kumar; Kalpana Pandit
- Starring: Ganesh Venkatraman; Kalpana Pandit; Shobana
- Cinematography: Chris Eldridge; C.J. Rajkumar
- Edited by: N. Vasanth; N. Ayappan
- Music by: Agnel Roman; Faizan Hussain
- Production companies: Dreams On Frames; House of Pandit
- Release dates: 10 August 2012 (Tamil); 30 May 2014 (Hindi)
- Running time: 143 minutes
- Country: India
- Languages: Tamil; Hindi

Panithuli (transl. Dew Drops) is a 2012 Tamil-language action film directed by Natty Kumar and Dr. Jay, starring Ganesh Venkatraman, Kalpana Pandit and Shobana. The film was released on 10 August 2012. It received predominately negative reviews. The film was simulatenously shot in Hindi as Tum Ho Yaara, which had a delayed release in 2014.

== Cast ==
- Ganesh Venkatraman as Shiva
- Kalpana Pandit as Maya
- Shobana as Meera
- Sreedharan Karthikeyan as Balu
- Narayan Sundararajan as Arun
- Thirumudi Thulasiraman as Rajaraman
- Natty Kumar as Veeraswamy
- Cliff Janke as Winston

== Production ==
The film was shot for 30 days in India and 62 days in the United States.

== Soundtrack ==
The soundtrack was composed by debutants Agnel Roman, and Faisal, and lyrics were written by Nawin Seetharaman, Thendral Ramkumar, Ashok Subramaniam, and Dr. Jay.

- "Azhagu Rakshasa" — Vinaitha Sivakumar
- "Kallakku" — Pragathi Guruprasad
- "Kan Parpathu" — Srinivas
- "Oru Pudhu Vaanam" — Thendral Ramkumar
- "Pasiyaa Thookkama" - Savi Suresh, Naresh Iyer
- "Uyirin" — Jayadev, Surmukhi Raman

== Reception ==
Behindwoods wrote, "On the whole, Panithuli is just a less impressive portfolio for Ganesh Venkatraman, who has tried to show us that he can carry the roles of an action hero, a lover boy and a mentally unstable man." The Hindu wrote "Panithuli is an example of how a simple story can be made complicated. To ensure that his film isn’t labelled run-of-the-mill, director Natty Kumar has added several episodes to a simple plot. But instead of making the film interesting, they have only turned it into a long and dreary affair." Rediff wrote "On the face of it, Panithuli, has the potential to be an edge-of-the-seat thriller. What it is, however, is a mishmash of terribly stereotyped characters trying in vain to mould themselves to suit a surreal landscape. The result leaves you laughing and yawning by turns". Sify wrote "The romantic thriller is supposed to be full of suspense and twists but at the end it leaves you totally confused and bewildered as the hero character in the film. Kumar and Jay embarked on making a typical M Night Shyamalan movie, but ends up with egg on their face".
