= Sergeant (film) =

- Official Poster
- Directed by: Prawaal Raman
- Written by: Prawaal Raman
- Produced by: Ajay Rai; Jyoti Deshpande; Mohit Chhabra
- Starring: Randeep Hooda; Adil Hussain; Arun Govil; Sapna Pabbi; Sonia Goswami; Xavi Nixon
- Cinematography: Benjamin Edgar; James Alfred; Jim Edgar
- Edited by: Praveen Angre
- Music by: Aman Pant; Tushar Lall
- Production companies: JAR Pictures; Jio Studios
- Distributed by: JioCinema
- Release date: 30 June 2023
- Running time: 104 minutes
- Country: India
- Language: Hindi

Sergeant is a 2023 Indian Hindi-language thriller film written and directed by Prawaal Raman. It stars Randeep Hooda, Adil Hussain, Arun Govil, Sapna Pabbi, Xavi Nixon and Sonia Goswami .

== Plot ==
Nikhil Sharma is a dedicated police officer. A risky case is driving him through an action-packed adventure, where the guilty must be found at all costs.

== Cast ==
- Randeep Hooda as Sergeant Nikhil Sharma/Nick
- Adil Hussain as Inspector Haider Ali
- Arun Govil as Nikhil's father
- Daphne Alexander as Amy
- Sapna Pabbi as Monica, Nikhil's lover
- Clive Coen as Mark, Nick's attorney
- AL Groves as Judge, Westminister Court
- Tahir Ashraf as Abdul Akhtar, Kalim's father
- Chandini Wilson as Faisa Akhtar, Kalim's mother
- Fay Oshodi as Daniella, Nick's Psychiatrist
- Lisa Lian as Eva Lee
- Isha Khaira as Ruby
- Jonas Siaulys as Ruby's Boyfriend
- Richa Prakash as Waitress
- Sonia Goswami as Doctor
- Hiten Patel as policeman
- Xavi Nixon as Young Nick

== Soundtrack ==
Track listing
No.	Title	Lyrics	Music	Singer(s)	Length
1.	"Quaid"	Anupam Sidhant	Tushar Lall	Osho Jain	1:40
2.	"Bhatka Hua Dil"	Akhil Tiwari	Aman Pant	Aman Pant	2:22
Total length:					4:02

== Release ==
The film was released on 30 June 2023 on JioCinema.

== Reception ==
Subhash K. Jha rated the film 3 stars out of 5 and wrote "It is also not very clear why Nikhil is so bitter about the world."

Archika Khurana of The Times of India wrote "'Sergeant' an interesting viewing."

A critic from OTTPlay felt the film is "amalgamation of an unbaked plot, lazy writing, and needless plot twists." Amar Ujala rated the film 2.5 stars out of 5.
