= Ganesh Venkatraman =

Indian actor

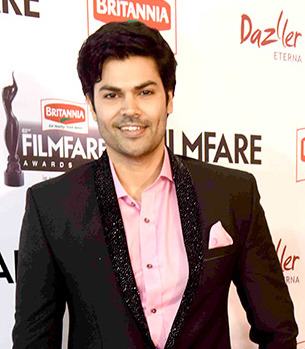
- Ganesh Venkatraman at the 62nd Filmfare Awards South, 2015
- Born: 20 March 1980 (age 46); Mumbai, Maharashtra, India
- Occupation: Actor
- Years active: 2006-present
- Spouse: Nisha Krishnan (m. 2015)
- Children: 2

Ganesh Venkatraman is an Indian actor who works predominantly in Tamil and Telugu films. He had acted in Radha Mohan's Abhiyum Naanum (2008), before working in Unnaipol Oruvan (2009) and Kandahar (2010). He is also the 3rd runner up of Bigg Boss 1 in 2017.

== Career ==
Ganesh began his acting career by appearing in television serials. It including Antariksh and Mayavi, which was the first known 3D serial in Tamil television. He made his film début with The Angrez (2006), an experimental crossover film shot in Hyderabadi Urdu but he could not garner any further film offers immediately. Subsequently, he made his début in Tamil cinema with Radha Mohan's family drama, Abhiyum Naanum (2008). He was cast in the role of Trisha's Punjabi fiancé, this role received critical acclaim. He appeared as a police officer, working alongside Mohanlal, Kamal Haasan and Venkatesh in the bilingual film Unnaipol Oruvan (2009), while he also portrayed an army general in Mohanlal Starrer Major Ravi's war film Kandahar. He also worked in a thriller film titled Muriyadi with Sathyaraj by Selva, but the film failed to have a theatrical release owing to Kavithalayaa Productions' financial troubles. During the period, Ganesh also opted out of another multi-starrer Mankatha (2011), and instead chose to work on another bilingual Tamil and Hindi film, Panithuli (2012), in a solo lead role. The film opened to negative reviews and performed poorly at the box office.Then he played antagonist in Nagarjuna Starrer Damarukam.

Ganesh worked on three projects in 2013, prioritising his work on Tamil cinema. He appeared in Sundar C's bilingual film, Theeya Velai Seiyyanum Kumaru in a supporting role of an office worker, while he was seen as a police officer in the action film, Ivan Veramathiri. He also portrayed the role of a prince in Roopa Iyer's Kannada and Tamil bilingual film, Chandra, and revealed that he signed on after hearing that Shriya Saran would be portraying the lead role. Ganesh subsequently worked on a few low budget films, the psychological thriller Achaaram (2015) and the drama Pallikoodam Pogamale (2015), both of which had limited theatrical releases. During the same year, he also portrayed a supporting role in Mohan Raja's Thani Oruvan (2015), which went on to become a success. His following his releases have fared less well with Thodari (2016) and Nayaki (2016), where he portrayed the antagonist, earning negative reviews and performing poorly at the box office. Likewise, neither of his subsequent investigative thriller films Inayathalam (2017) or 7 Naatkal (2017) were able to perform well commercially. For his role in Inayathalam, Ganesh spent time with the Chennai cyber-crime division to prepare for his character. Ganesh also played a negative role in the 2018 Malayalam film, My Story, and won acclaim. Ganesh Venkatraman in making his Bollywood debut as the antagonist of Guns of Banaras (2020), the Hindi remake of Polladhavan.

Ganesh Venkatraman is gearing up to grace the small screen once again, this time he will be seen as the lead in the upcoming TV serial Ninaithen Vandhai. He has played in the role of a police officer in the thriller, The Door (2025). He plays a psychologist In the long delayed movie Un Paarvayil (2025).

== Other work ==
Prior to acting, Ganesh Venkatraman was a model and had been chosen Gladrags Mr. India 2003 and been a representative for India in Mr. World 2004. In September 2014, Ganesh made his debut as a television host by presenting the reality game show Vendhar Veetu Kalyanam on Vendhar TV. He later appeared in the reality show Achcham Thavir by Star Vijay. In 2017, he took part as a contestant in the Bigg Boss reality show, and finished as the show's third runner up.

== Personal life ==
Ganesh Venkatraman was born to Tamil Brahmin Iyer parents. He and actress Nisha Krishnan got married in November 2015.

== Filmography ==
| Year | Film | Role | Language | Notes |
|---|---|---|---|---|
| 2006 | The Angrez | Rochak Suddala | English/Hyderabadi Urdu | |
| 2008 | Abhiyum Naanum | Joginder Singh | Tamil | |
| 2009 | Unnaipol Oruvan | Inspector Arif Khan | Tamil | Edison Award for Best Supporting Actor |
| 2009 | Eenadu | Inspector Arif Khan | Telugu | |
| 2010 | Kandahar | Captain Sooryanath Sharma | Malayalam | |
| 2011 | Ko | Himself | Tamil | Special appearance |
| 2012 | Panithuli | Shiva | Tamil | |
| 2012 | Damarukam | Rahul | Telugu | |
| 2013 | Theeya Velai Seiyyanum Kumaru | George | Tamil | |
| 2013 | Chandra | Arya | Kannada | |
| 2013 | Ivan Veramathiri | DCP Aravindan | Tamil | |
| 2014 | Chandra | Arya | Tamil | |
| 2014 | Tum Ho Yaara | Shiva | Hindi | Hindi version of Panithuli |
| 2015 | Achaaram | SI Suriya | Tamil | |
| 2015 | Thani Oruvan | Shakthi IPS | Tamil | |
| 2015 | Pallikoodam Pogamale | DCP Ganesh Venkatram | Tamil | |
| 2016 | Nayagi | Yogendher | Tamil | |
| 2016 | Nayaki | Yogendher | Telugu | |
| 2016 | Thodari | DIG Sultan | Tamil | |
| 2017 | Inayathalam | Ganesh IPS | Tamil | |
| 2017 | 7 Naatkal | Sai Prasad IPS | Tamil | |
| 2018 | My Story | David Eapen | Malayalam | Santhosham Award for Best Villain |
| 2019 | Raagala 24 Gantallo | Ganesh IAS | Telugu | |
| 2020 | Guns of Banaras | Vikram Singh | Hindi | |
| 2023 | Varisu | Mukesh | Tamil | |
| 2023 | Red Sandalwood | Ramaiya | Tamil | |
| 2024 | Rathnam | Rathnam's late father | Tamil | Cameo appearance |
| 2024 | Anthima Theerpu | DCP Bose | Telugu | |
| 2024 | Sabari | Aravind | Telugu | |
| 2025 | The Door | Raisudeen | Tamil | |
| 2025 | Unpaarvaiyil | Krish | Tamil | Released on Sun NXT |

== Television ==
| Year | Show | Role | Language | Notes |
|---|---|---|---|---|
| 2006 | Antariksh - Ek Amar Katha | Amar | Hindi | |
| 2006-2007 | Mayavi | Vikram | Tamil | |
| 2014 | Vendhar Veetu Kalyanam | Anchor | Tamil | |
| 2016 | Achcham Thavir | Contestant | Tamil | 1st Runner Up |
| 2017 | Bigg Boss Tamil 1 | Contestant | Tamil | 3rd Runner-up |
| 2020 | Thirumagal | Himself | Tamil | Special appearance |
| 2021 | Vanakkam Tamizha | Guest | Tamil | Along with Nisha |
| 2021 | Rowdy Baby | Contestant | Tamil | |
| 2021 | Kannana Kanne | Assistant Commissioner Dinesh | Tamil | Special appearance |
| 2022 | Namma Veettu Kalyanam | Guest | Tamil | Along with Nisha |
| 2022 | Thallatu | Aravind | Tamil | Special appearance |
| 2023 | Sweet Kaaram Coffee | The Major | Tamil | |
| 2024-2025 | Ninaithen Vandhai | Dr. Ezhil | Tamil | Lead Role |
