= Ninaithen Vandhai (TV series) =

Indian television series

- Genre: Drama; Supernatural
- Screenplay by: Paari Ayyasamy
- Directed by: Brahma G Dev (prev) Jeevarajan (currently)
- Starring: Ganesh Venkatraman; Keerthana Podhuval; Abhirami Venkatachalam; Anjali Rao
- Country of origin: India
- Original language: Tamil
- No. of episodes: 285

Production
- Producer: S. Singaravelan
- Editor: Mojith Aji
- Camera setup: Multi-camera
- Running time: 22 minutes
- Production company: SS Group

Original release
- Network: Zee Tamil
- Release: 22 January 2024 – 19 January 2025

Related
- Nindu Noorella Savaasam

Ninaithen Vandhai (transl. When I Thought of You, You Came) is a 2024-2025 Indian supernatural Tamil language television series starring Ganesh Venkatraman, Keerthana Podhuval, Abhirami Venkatachalam, and Anjali Rao It is the official remake of Zee Telugu's TV series Nindu Noorella Savaasam. It aired on Zee Tamil from 22 January 2024 and ended on 19 January 2025 completing 285 episodes.

== Plot ==
Ezhil, a successful doctor, is happily married to Indhumathi and has four children with her. After she gets into a car accident and dies, Ezhil is unable to cope and neglects his children due to his inability to get over his wife’s death. Whilst her soul roams the house and looks after the children, when Sudarvizhi comes to the house to look after the kids, will she be the right fit?

== Cast ==
=== Main ===
- Ganesh Venkatraman as Dr. Ezhil: Kanakavalli's son; Indhumathi's widower; Sudarvizhi's husband; Abhi, Kavin and Kavya's father; Anjali's adoptive father (2024–2025)
- Keerthana Podhuval as Indhumathi: Subramani's elder daughter; Sudarvizhi's sister; Ezhil's first wife; Abhi, Kavin and Kavya's mother; Anjali's adoptive mother (2024–2025) (Dead)
- Jasmine Rath / Abhirami Venkatachalam as Sudarvizhi / Tamizh: Subramani's younger daughter; Indhumathi's sister; Ezhil's second wife; Abhi, Kavin and Kavya's step-mother; Anjali's adoptive step-mother (2024) / (2024–2025)

=== Supporting ===
- Anjali Rao as Manohari: Ezhil's childhood best friend and obsessive lover; Indhumathi's murderer; Muthupandi’s wife (2024–2025) (Dead)
- Kanishka Vijaykumar as Abhi: Ezhil and Indhumathi's elder daughter; Sudarvizhi's step-daughter; Kavin and Kavya's sister; Anjali's adopted sister (2024–2025)
- Koushik Shivanand as Kavin: Ezhil and Indhumathi's son; Sudarvizhi's step-son; Abhi and Kavya's brother; Anjali's adopted brother (2024–2025)
- Yuktha Sharma / Sasha as Kavya: Ezhil and Indhumathi's younger daughter; Sudarvizhi's step-daughter; Abhi and Kavin's sister; Anjali's adopted sister (2024) / (2024–2025)
- Safa as Anjali: Ezhil and Indhumathi's adopted daughter; Sudarvizhi's adopted step-daughter; Abhi, Kavin and Kavya's adopted sister (2024–2025)
- Udumalai Ravi as Ramaiyya: Ezhil's driver (2024–2025)
- Revathee Shankar as Kanakavalli: Ezhil's mother; Abhi, Kavin and Kavya's grandmother; Anjali's adoptive grandmother (2024–2025)
- Punitha / Karthika as Selvi: Ezhil's house helper (2024) / (2024–2025)
- Ravi Shankar as Subramani: Indhumathi and Sudarvizhi's father; Abhi, Kavin and Kavya's grandfather; Anjali's adoptive grandfather (2024–2025)
- Ashwinkarthi as Muthupandi: Sudarvizhi's cousin; Manohari’s husband (2024–2025)
- Mahesh as Ponnuvel: Sudarvizhi's ex-fiancé (2024)
- Akshaya Kimmy as Deepa: Indhumathi and Sudarvizhi's friend (2024) (Dead)
- Sripavi as Tamizh (2024)
- Mounika Subramaniyam as Swetha (2024)
- Nalini as Kasiammal (2024)
- Sravanan Sudhan as Manoj: Indhumathi’s killer planned by Manohari

== Production ==
=== Casting ===
Actor Ganesh Venkatraman was cast in the main lead role in the serial, making his comeback full-fledged return to television silverscreen after a hiatus of 17 years. Keerthana Podhuval was cast in the female lead role in the serial, returning to Tamil television after nearly two years. Odia actress Jasmine Rath was cast in the female lead role as Sudarvizhi, making this her Tamil debut. However she left the series in end of August 2024 and was replaced by Abhirami Venkatachalam from episodes 154. SS Group Max are producers for the show, having previously produced Thavamai Thavamirundhu for the channel.

==== Release ====
The first promo was unveiled on 13 December 2023, featuring Ganesh Venkatraman. The second promo was unveiled on 6 January 2024, which gives a brief insight into Ezhil’s life and introduced the audience to Sudarvizhi.

It began airing on Zee Tamil starting 22 January 2024, replacing Seetha Raman’s time slot. This series was launched along with Thangamagal, Gowri and Chinna Marumagal.

== Adaptations ==
Language	Title	Original release	Network(s)	Last aired	Notes
Telugu	Nindu Noorella Savaasam నిండు నూరెళ్ల సవాసం	14 August 2023	Zee Telugu	Ongoing	Original
Tamil	Ninaithen Vandhai நினைத்தேன் வந்தாய்	22 January 2024	Zee Tamil	19 January 2025	Remake

|- | Malyalam | Aval Arundhati
അവൾ അരുന്ധതി | 24 May 2025 | Zee Keralam | Ongoing | Dubbed |-
