= Kalpana Pandit =

Indian actress

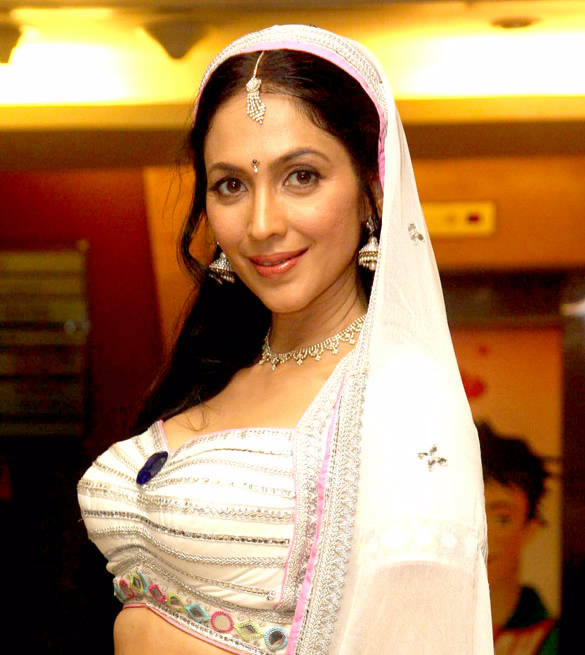
- Kalpana Pandit in 2012
- Born: 20 January 1967 (age 59)
- Occupations: Actress; Model; Producer; Physician
- Years active: 2000–present
- Modelling information
- Height: 5 ft 9 in (1.75 m)
- Hair colour: Black
- Eye colour: Brown

Kalpana Pandit (born 20 January 1967) is an Indian actress, model, and emergency physician. She owns the film production company House of Pandit (TM). She is known for her works in Bollywood, and Kannada cinema. In 2008, she hosted the technical awards ceremony of Zee Cine Awards in London. Pandit served as one of the jury of the Mrs. America Pageant 2012, which took place on 29 August 2012, in Tucson, Arizona. In November 2013, Pandit served on the Celebrity Judging Panel of "Mrs World 2013" held in Guangzhou, China.

== Early life and career ==
Kalpana Pandit is the granddaughter of Ayurvedic physician Bhishagratna Ayurveda Vidwan Sri B. V. Pandit. After gaining a M.B.B.S. degree from the prestigious Mysore Medical College and Research Institute, she obtained an M.D. in internal medicine, from USA. She then worked as an emergency physician in USA.

She modeled for television commercials for products like Wheel detergent powder, Mysore sandal talc, Nyle, Ranipal stain remover and Sirtex in India. In 2000, she made her acting debut with the Bollywood film Gaja Gamini, directed by M. F. Husain.

== Filmography ==
Year	Film	Role	Language	Notes
2000	Gaja Gamini	Abhisarika	Hindi	
2001	Moksha	Neelima	Hindi	
2002	Pitaah		Hindi	Special appearance in song 'Meri Jawani'
2003	Pran Jaye Par Shaan Na Jaye		Hindi	Special appearance
2003	Om		Hindi	Special appearance
2003	Pyaar Kiya Nahin Jaatha	Anju	Hindi	
2004	Anandamanandamaye		Telugu	Special appearance
2005	Padmashree Laloo Prasad Yadav	Supermodel "Chidiya Chidiya"	Hindi	Special appearance
2007	Deha	Supermodel	Hindi	
2009	Anubhav	Laila	Hindi	
2010	Jo Jo Laali	Kalpana	Kannada	
2011	Love Khichdi	Nafisa Khan	Hindi	
2012	Panithuli	Maya	Tamil	
2012	Janleva 555	Neelam / Rajani	Hindi	
2013	The Chinaman	Caroline	English	
2014	Tum Ho Yaara	Maya	Hindi	
2015	Sulige Sikkidaaga	Pallavi	Kannada	
2018	When I Sing	Antonia	English	

== Awards ==
- Best Actress Kannada - South Indian Mega Short Film Festival 2011 Bangalore - Jo Jo Laali (2010)
- Best Actress- Bangalore Shorts Film Festival 2013 - " Jo Jo Laali"
- Actress/ Independent New Producer Award 2013 _ Shiv Rajmudra Chatrapati Shivaji Award Mumbai 2013 for " Janleva 555"
- Best Actress-Bollywood International Film Festival 2016 _ Sulige Sikkidaaga " Be fluid as water.... "
