= Khatron Ke Khiladi 5 =

Indian reality television series

Fear Factor: Khatron Ke Khiladi
- Season 5
- Title screen
- Presented by: Rohit Shetty
- No. of contestants: 17
- Winner: Rajniesh Duggal
- Runner-up: Gurmeet Choudhary
- No. of episodes: 20

Release
- Original network: Colors TV
- Original release: 22 March – 25 May 2014

Season chronology
- ← Previous; Season 4 Next → Season 6

Fear Factor: Khatron Ke Khiladi Darr Ka Blockbuster is the fifth season of Indian stunt/action reality game show Fear Factor: Khatron Ke Khiladi , based on the American Fear Factor. The series premiered on Colors TV. It was the 1st season of the series to include both male and female participants. Rohit Shetty joined the show for the first time as host and has subsequently hosted all the following seasons, except season seven. The first episode was narrated by Bollywood actor Amitabh Bachchan.Rajniesh Duggal was the winner of this season and Gurmeet Chaudhary was the runner-up.

== Contestants ==
Contestant	Occupation	Status	Place	Ref
Rajniesh Duggal	Actor, model	Winner	1	
Gurmeet Choudhary	Actor	1st runner-up	2	
Nikitin Dheer	Actor	2nd runner-up	3	
Debina Bonnerjee	Actress	3rd runner-up	4	
Salman Yusuff Khan	Choreographer, actor	Eliminated	5	
Karanvir Bohra	Actor, producer	Eliminated	6	
Teejay Sidhu	Actor, VJ	Eliminated	7	
Gauahar Khan	Model, actress	Eliminated	8	
Gauahar Khan	Model, actress	Eliminated	8	
Ranvir Shorey	Actor	Eliminated	9	
Deana Uppal	Actress, model	Eliminated	10	
Ajaz Khan	Model, actor	Eliminated	11	
Geeta Tandon	Stunt woman	Eliminated	12	
Dayanand Shetty	Actor	Eliminated	13	
Kushal Tandon	Actor, model	Quit	14	
Mugdha Godse	Actress, model	Eliminated	15	
Rochelle Rao	Model, anchor	Eliminated	16	
Pooja Gor	Actress	Eliminated	17	

Indicates original entrants
Indicates the wild card entrants
Indicates re-entered entrants

== Elimination chart ==
Contestant	Weeks																																				
Contestant	Grand Premiere			Dosti Special			Wild Card Week				Khartnak Special			Race to Power Jacket				Torture Week			Filmy Special						Ticket to Finale				Semi-Finale					10 Grand Finale	
Contestant	22-23 March			29-30 March			5-6 April				12-13 April			19-20 April				26-27 April			3-4 May						10-11 May				17-18 May					25 May	
Rajniesh	WIN			SAFE			LOST		SAFE		WIN			LOST		BTM2	SAFE	WIN			WIN	WIN					LOST	BTM2	BTM	SAFE	10	10	Finalist			WIN	WINNER
Gurmeet	WIN			WIN			WIN				WIN			Jacket				WIN			WIN						LOST	Safe			10	10	Finalist			WIN	1ST RUNNER-UP
Nikitin	LOST	BTM	SAFE	WIN			LOST		BTM6	SAFE	LOST	BTM5	SAFE	WIN, Top 2				WIN			WIN	WIN					LOST	BTM4	SAFE		0	0	BTM4	SAFE	Finalist	WIN	2ND RUNNER-UP
Debina	LOST	BTM5	SAFE	LOST	BTM5	SAFE	WIN				WIN			WIN				SAFE			LOST	BTM6		BTM4	SAFE		WIN				10	0	Finalist			WIN	3RD RUNNER-UP
Salman	WIN			WIN			WIN				WIN			WIN				WIN			SAFE	LOST	BTM6	SAFE			Safe				10	0	Finalist			LOST	ELIMINATED
Karanvir	NOT IN COMPETITION						WILD CARD	LOST	SAFE		WIN			WIN				WIN			WIN						WIN				0	0	BTM4	SAFE	Finalist	LOST	ELIMINATED
Teejay	NOT IN COMPETITION						WILD CARD	LOST	BTM6	SAFE	WIN			WIN				WIN			WIN	LOST	BTM6	BTM4	SAFE		WIN				0	0	BTM4	SAFE	Finalist	LOST	ELIMINATED
Gauahar	WIN			LOST	BTM5	SAFE	WIN				LOST	BTM5	SAFE	LOST		SAFE		LOST	BTM3	ELIMINATED (returned in 8th Week)							LOST	SAFE			0	10	Finalist			LOST	ELIMINATED
Ranbir	LOST	BTM	SAFE	WIN			WIN				WIN			WIN				WIN			WIN	LOST	BTM6	SAFE			LOST	BTM4	SAFE		0	0	BTM4	ELIMINATED			
Deana	NOT IN COMPETITION													WILD CARD	LOST	SAFE		LOST	SAFE		LOST	BTM6		BTM4	BTM2	SAFE	LOST	BTM4	BTM2	ELIMINATED							
Ajaz	NOT IN COMPETITION													WILD CARD	LOST	SAFE		LOST	BTM3	SAFE	SAFE	LOST	BTM6	BTM4	BTM2	ELIMINATED											
Geeta	WIN			WIN			WIN				LOST	BTM5	SAFE	LOST		Lost		LOST	BTM2	ELIMINATED																	
Dayanand	LOST	BTM5	SAFE	WIN			LOST		BTM6	SAFE	LOST	BTM5	SAFE	LOST		BTM2	ELIMINATED																				
Kushal	WIN			WIN			WIN				WIN		QUIT																								
Mugdha	WIN			LOST	BTM5	SAFE	WIN				LOST	BTM5	ELIMINATED																								
Rochelle	LOST	BTM5	SAFE	LOST	BTM5	SAFE	LOST		BTM6	ELIMINATED																											
Pooja	WIN			LOST	BTM5	ELIMINATED																															

Winner
1st runner-up
2nd runner-up
Finalists
Jacket
Won First Task
Was Exempted from performing Pre-Elimination stunt and Elimination stunt
Lost First Task
Won Pre-Elimination stunt
Saved from elimination by winning elimination stunt
Bottom Position
Not in Competition
Wild Card Entry
Eliminated
Quit
