= Anubhav (2009 film) =

- Directed by: Rajeev Nath
- Screenplay by: Anoop Menon
- Produced by: MMR Entertainment
- Starring: Jackie Shroff; Sanjay Suri; Gul Panag; Shruti Seth; Anoop Menon; Rajendranath Zutshi; Rajesh Hebbar; Sudha Chandran; Mita Vasisht; Rakesh Bedi; Kalpana Pandit
- Cinematography: Azhagappan
- Edited by: Suresh Pai
- Music by: Krishnamohan; Raju Rao; Aadesh Shrivastava
- Release date: 5 June 2009
- Country: India
- Language: Hindi

Anubhav is a 2009 Indian Hindi-language film directed by Rajeev Nath starring Sanjay Suri in the lead role. The film was released on 5 June 2009.

== Cast ==
Actor	Character
Jackie Shroff	Ibrahim Vakil a.k.a. Guru
Sanjay Suri	Anubhav Malhotra
Gul Panag	Meera Hemant Valecha a.k.a. Meera A. Malhotra
Shruti Seth	Antara
Anoop Menon	Aditya a.k.a. Adi
Rajendranath Zutshi	Vanraj
Rajesh Hebbar	
Sudha Chandran	Kalpana
Mita Vasisht	Dr. Kamla
Rakesh Bedi	Film producer
Kalpana Pandit	Savita

== Release ==
The Times of India gave the film two out of five stars and stated that "The only thing that holds the film together is a fine act by Sanjay Suri who tries to invest some dignity in this film that borders on the crude".
