= Shaandaar =

Shaandaar or Shandaar may refer to:

- Shaandaar (1974 film), 1974 Indian film by Krishnan–Panju
- Shandaar (1990 film), 1990 Indian film directed by Vinod Dewan
- Shaandaar (2015 film), 2015 Indian film by Vikas Bahl

== See also ==
- Shandar, French record label
- Shandar, Iran (disambiguation)
