= Shandarreh =

Shandarreh شندره
- Village
- Location within Iran
- Coordinates: 36°10′22″N 45°37′26″E
- Country: Iran
- Province: West Azerbaijan
- County: Sardasht
- Bakhsh: Central
- Rural District: Gavork-e Sardasht

Population (2006)
  - Total: 87
- Time zone: UTC+3:30 (IRST)
  - Summer (DST): UTC+4:30 (IRDT)

Shandarreh (Persian: شندره; also known as Shandār) is a village in Gavork-e Sardasht Rural District, in the Central District of Sardasht County, West Azerbaijan Province, Iran. At the 2006 census, its population was 87, in 16 families.
