= Debina Bonnerjee =

Indian actress (born 1983)

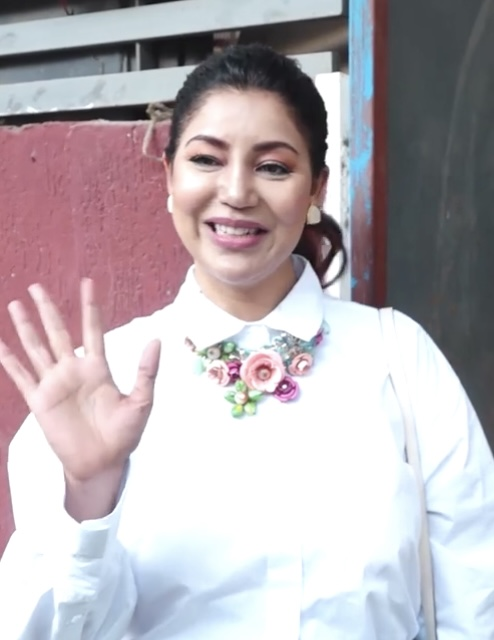
- Bonnerjee in 2023
- Born: Debina Banerjee; 18 April 1983 (age 43); Kolkata, West Bengal, India
- Occupation: Actress
- Years active: 2003–present
- Notable work: Ramayan; Chidiya Ghar; Santoshi Maa
- Spouse: Gurmeet Choudhary (m. 2011)
- Children: 2

Debina Bonnerjee (born 18 April 1983) is an Indian actress who appears predominantly in Hindi films and television. Bonnerjee is best known for her portrayal of Sita in Ramayan, Mayuri Narayan in Chidiya Ghar and Poulomi in Santoshi Maa. She has been part of films such as Ammayilu Abbayilu (2003), Nanjundi (2003) and Perarasu (2006). She participated in reality shows Nach Baliye 6 and Fear Factor: Khatron Ke Khiladi 5, becoming the first runner-up and third runner-up respectively.

== Personal life ==
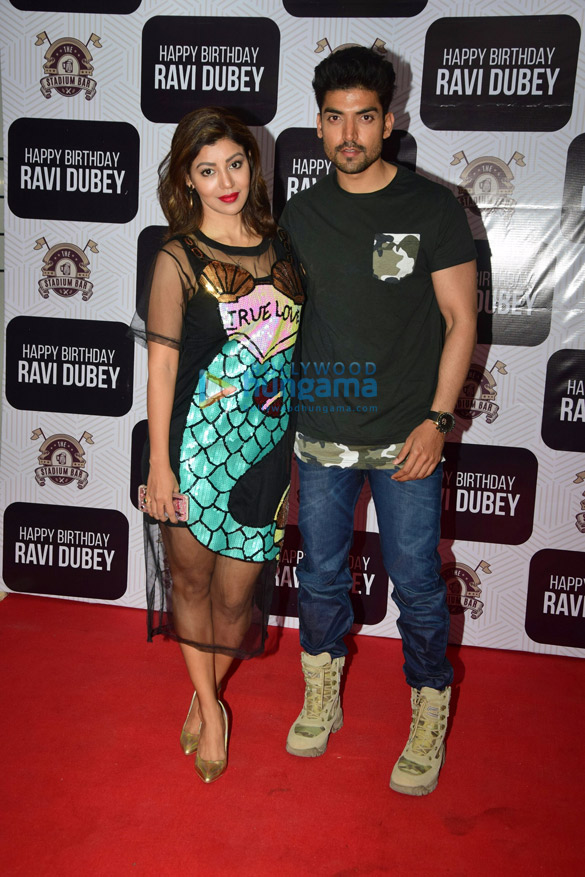
Bonnerjee with her husband Gurmeet Choudhary

Bonnerjee met actor Gurmeet Choudhary in 2004. Following a long relationship, the couple got married on 15 February 2011. On 3 April 2022, they had their first daughter, Lianna. On 11 November 2022, they had another daughter, Divisha.

Bonnerjee is also fluent in languages such as Bengali, Hindi, English and Tamil.

== Career ==
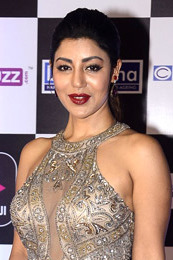
Bonnerjee in 2018

In 2008, she was well known for playing the role Sita and Lakshmi in the television soap opera Ramayan.

Her first television role was in the Tamil TV serial Mayavi (2005). She also appeared as Mayuri in Chidiya Ghar and in several reality shows. In 2019, she appeared in Colors TV's show Vish: A Poisonous Story.

In 2025, Bonnerjee participated in Colors TV's reality show, Dhammal with Pati Patni Aur Panga – Jodiyon Ka Reality Check, along with her husband, Gurmeet. The couple emerged as the first runner up of the series.

== Filmography ==
=== Films ===
| Year | Title | Role | Language | Notes | Ref. |
|---|---|---|---|---|---|
| 2003 | Indian Babu | Ms. Thakur | Hindi | | |
| 2003 | Ammayilu Abbayilu | Manju | Telugu | | |
| 2003 | Nanjundi | Soundarya | Kannada | | |
| 2006 | Perarasu | Aishwarya | Tamil | | |
| 2011 | Akash Akhono Nil | Unknown | Bengali | | |
| 2013 | Six | Herself | Telugu | Special appearance in song "Surru Surru" | |
| 2015 | Khamoshiyan | Simran | Hindi | | |
| 2020 | Shubho Bijoya | Bijoya | Hindi | Short film | |

=== Television ===
| Year | Title | Role | Notes | Ref. |
|---|---|---|---|---|
| 2006–2007 | Mayavi | Shakthi | Tamil series | |
| 2008–2009 | Ramayan | Sita / Lakshmi | | |
| 2009 | Pati Patni Aur Woh | Contestant | | |
| 2010 | Aahat | Kajal | | |
| 2011–2014 | Chidiya Ghar | Mayuri Narayan | | |
| 2011 | Zor Ka Jhatka: Total Wipeout | Contestant | | |
| 2011 | Star Ya Rockstar | Contestant | | |
| 2013 | Nach Baliye Shriman v/s Shrimati | Contestant | | |
| 2013–2014 | Nach Baliye 6 | Contestant | 1st runner-up | |
| 2014 | Fear Factor: Khatron Ke Khiladi 5 | Contestant | 3rd runner-up | |
| 2015–2016 | Yam Hain Hum | Dhumorna | | |
| 2016 | Dr. Madhumati On Duty | Dr. Madhumati | | |
| 2016–2017 | Santoshi Maa | Poulomi | | |
| 2018 | Laal Ishq | Vidya "Vidu" | Episode: "Antarmahal" | |
| 2019 | Vish | Vishaili / Sabrina Kothari | | |
| 2020 | Aladdin – Naam Toh Suna Hoga | Mallika / Parveena | | |
| 2025 | Pati Patni Aur Panga – Jodiyon Ka Reality Check | Contestant | 1st runner-up | |
| 2025–2026 | Laughter Chefs – Unlimited Entertainment season 3 | Contestant | | |

==== Special appearances ====
| Year | Title | Role | Ref. |
|---|---|---|---|
| 2013 | Welcome – Baazi Mehmaan Nawazi Ki | House Guest | |
| 2014 | Nadaniyaan | Chandu's friend | |
| 2015 | Killerr Karaoke Atka Toh Latkah | Herself | |
| 2016 | The Kapil Sharma Show | Kiku Sharda's wife | |
| 2016 | Comedy Nights Bachao | Herself | |
| 2017 | Tenali Rama | Mohini | |
| 2018 | Khichdi | Painter | |
| 2019 | Kitchen Champion | Herself | |
| 2019 | Khatra Khatra Khatra | Herself | |
| 2021 | Meet: Badlegi Duniya Ki Reet | Herself | |
| 2022 | Bigg Boss 15 | Herself | |

== See also ==
- List of Indian television actresses
