= Mohammad Faiz =

- Born: Mohammad Faiz; Jodhpur, Rajasthan, India
- Genre: Playback singing
- Occupation: Singer
- Instrument: Vocals
- Years active: 2018–present

Mohammad Faiz is an Indian singer. He rose to prominence after winning the second season of the television singing competition Superstar Singer in 2022. Following his victory, he released independent music and later worked as a playback singer in Hindi-language films.

== Early life ==
Faiz was born in Jodhpur, Rajasthan, India. He developed an interest in music at a young age and participated in singing competitions before appearing on national television.

== Career ==
Faiz gained national attention through his participation in Superstar Singer Season 2, a singing reality television series broadcast on Sony Entertainment Television. He was declared the winner of the competition in 2022.

Following the competition, he collaborated with music composer Himesh Reshammiya and released several songs, including Merre Liye, Nashaa, Pyaar Aayaa, Achchaa Hotaa, and Terre Liye.

In 2024, Faiz made his Hindi film playback singing debut with Dekhha Tenu from Mr. & Mrs. Mahi. In 2025, he recorded Mere Naal Tu for Saunkan Saunkanay 2 and Kya Hain Irada for KOOKI.

== Discography ==
=== Film songs ===
- Dekhha Tenu (Mr. & Mrs. Mahi, 2024)
- Mere Naal Tu (Saunkan Saunkanay 2, 2025)
- Kya Hain Irada (KOOKI, 2025)
- Tum Mere Ho-(Title Track) (Tum Mere Ho (2026 film), 2026)

=== Singles ===
2022

- Merre Liye

2023

- Nashaa
- Tu Hii To
- Teri Chahaton Se
- Tere Ho Gaye
- Tu Jo Mujhe Naa Mili
- O Meri Maa
- Meri Zindagi Hai Tu
- Chaahungaa Tujhe
- Jaann Se Zyaadaa

2024

- Kabhi Shaam Dhale
- Tu Hi Tu
- Sonaa Meraa Maahii
- Jhaanjar

2025

- Matt Jaao
- Teri Galiyon Mein
- Teri Chaahatt Meinn

2026

- Eyes

== Awards ==
- Superstar Singer Season 2 (winner)
