= Gurmeet Choudhary =

Indian actor (born 1984)

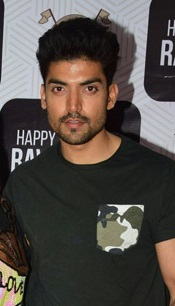
- Choudhary in 2017
- Born: 22 February 1984 (age 42); Jairampur, Bihar, India
- Occupations: Actor; martial artist
- Years active: 2004–present
- Notable work: Khamoshiyan; Wajah Tum Ho; Paltan; Geet – Hui Sabse Parayi; Ramayan; Punar Vivah
- Spouse: Debina Bonnerjee (m. 2011)
- Children: 2

Gurmeet Choudhary (born 22 February 1984) is an Indian actor and martial artist who primarily works in Hindi films and television. Choudhary is best known for his portrayal of Rama in Ramayan, Maan Singh Khurana in Geet – Hui Sabse Parayi and Yash Pratap Scindia in Punar Vivaah - Zindagi Milegi Dobara. In 2012, Choudhary participated in Jhalak Dikhhla Jaa 5 and emerged as the winner. He also participated in Nach Baliye 6 and Fear Factor: Khatron Ke Khiladi 5, emerging as the 1st runner-up, at both shows. He made his film debut with Khamoshiyan.

== Early life and background ==
Choudhary was born on 22 February 1984,in Jairampur, Bhagalpur, Bihar. The Gurmeet Choudhary Foundation launched a post-Covid specialised care centre at his hometown. His elder brother is a general physician in his hometown. Choudhary is also a trained martial artist.

== Career ==
Choudhary in 2013

Choudhary first gained prominence through his portrayal of Rama in the 2009 television series Ramayan, opposite Debina Bonnerjee who played the role of Sita. Choudhary participated in the reality show Pati Patni Aur Woh with his then fiancée, Debina Bonnerjee who also played Sita in Ramayan. After this show, he played the role of a business magnate Maan Singh Khurana in Geet – Hui Sabse Parayi alongside Drashti Dhami. He played a lead role in the show Punar Vivah as Yash Sindhia, alongside Kratika Sengar.

Choudhary participated in and won the fifth season of the popular dance contest Jhalak Dikhhla Jaa with choreographer Shampa Sonthalia. He competed in the dance contest Nach Baliye 6 alongside his wife Debina Bonnerjee, his co-star from Ramayan, whom he had married in 2011, in which he finished as the first runner up. They were choreographed by Pratik Utekar. He participated in an action reality show Fear Factor: Khatron Ke Khiladi (season 5) where he was named the first runner-up.

Choudhary's first foray into the Bollywood film industry was in 2015 when he was cast as the character of Jaidev in the psychological thriller Khamoshiyan, produced by Fox Studios India and Vishesh Films.

In 2025, Choudhary participated in Colors TV's reality show, Dhammal with Pati Patni Aur Panga – Jodiyon Ka Reality Check along with his wife, Debina. The couple emerged as the first runner up of the series.

== Personal life ==
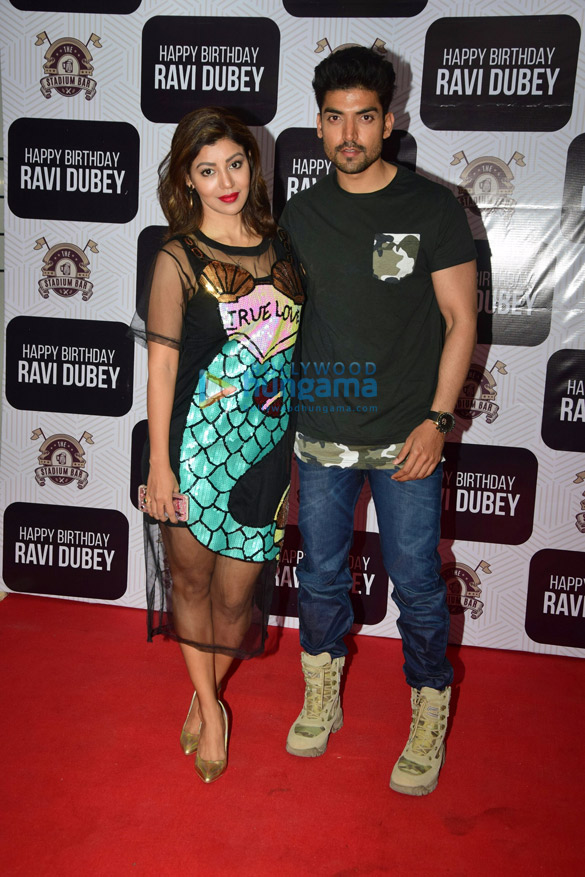
Choudhary with his wife Debina Bonnerjee

Choudhary met actress Debina Bonnerjee in 2004. Following a long relationship, the couple got married on 15 February 2011. On 3 April 2022, they had their first daughter, Lianna. On 11 November 2022, they had another daughter, Divisha.

== Filmography ==
=== Films ===
Year	Title	Role	Notes
2015	Khamoshiyan	Jaidev Dhanrajgir	
2015	Mr. X	Himself	Song: "Alif Se"
2016	Wajah Tum Ho	Advocate Ranveer Bajaj	
2017	Laali Ki Shaadi Mein Laaddoo Deewana	Prince Veer	
2018	Paltan	Capt. Prithvi Singh Dagar	
2021	The Wife	Varun	
2026	Tum Mere Ho	Akash	

=== Television ===
Year	Title	Role	Notes
2004	Kumkum – Ek Pyara Sa Bandhan	Ballu	
2006	Mayavi	Hiranyan	Tamil serial
2008–2009	Ramayan	Lord Ram/ Lord Vishnu	
2009	Pati Patni Aur Woh	Contestant	
2010–2011	Geet – Hui Sabse Parayi	Maan Singh Khurana	
2012	Jhalak Dikhhla Jaa 5	Contestant	Winner
2012–2013	Punar Vivaah - Zindagi Milegi Dobara	Yash Suraj Pratap Sindhia	
2013	Nach Baliye Shriman v/s Shrimati	Contestant	
2013–2014	Nach Baliye 6	Contestant	1st runner-up
2014	Fear Factor: Khatron Ke Khiladi 5	Contestant	1st runner-up
2015	I Can Do That	Contestant	2nd runner-up
2016	Box Cricket League 2	Contestant	
2025	Pati Patni Aur Panga	Contestant	1st runner-up
2025–2026	Laughter Chefs – Unlimited Entertainment season 3	Contestant	

=== Web series ===
Year	Title	Role	Notes
2024	Commander Karan Saxena	Karan Saxena	
2024	Yeh Kaali Kaali Ankhein	Guru	

=== Special appearances ===
Year	Title	Role	Ref.
2004	Yeh Meri Life Hai	Gurmeet	
2010	Bandini	Himself	
2011	Pyaar Kii Ye Ek Kahaani	Himself	
2011	Chotti Bahu – Sawar Ke Rang Rachi	Himself	
2016	Diya Aur Baati Hum	Himself	
2021	Meet: Badlegi Duniya Ki Reet	Himself	

=== Music video appearances ===
Year	Title	Singer(s)	Ref.
2019	"Intezaar"	Asees Kaur, Arijit Singh	
2021	"Bedardi Se Pyaar Ka"	Jubin Nautiyal	
2021	"Barsaat Ki Dhun"	Jubin Nautiyal	
2021	"Mazaa"	B Praak	
2021	"Dil Galti Kar Baitha Hai"	Jubin Nautiyal	
2021	"Ravayatein"	Siddharth Hazarika	
2022	"Dil Pe Zakhm"	Jubin Nautiyal	
2022	"Tumse Pyaar Karke"	Tulsi Kumar, Jubin Nautiyal	
2022	"Kuch Baatein"	Payal Dev, Jubin Nautiyal	
2022	"Teri Galliyon Se"	Jubin Nautiyal	
2023	"Tere Mere"	Asees Kaur, Stebin Ben	

== See also ==
- List of Indian television actors
- List of Indian film actors
